= Caribana Festival (Switzerland) =

Annual Swiss music festival

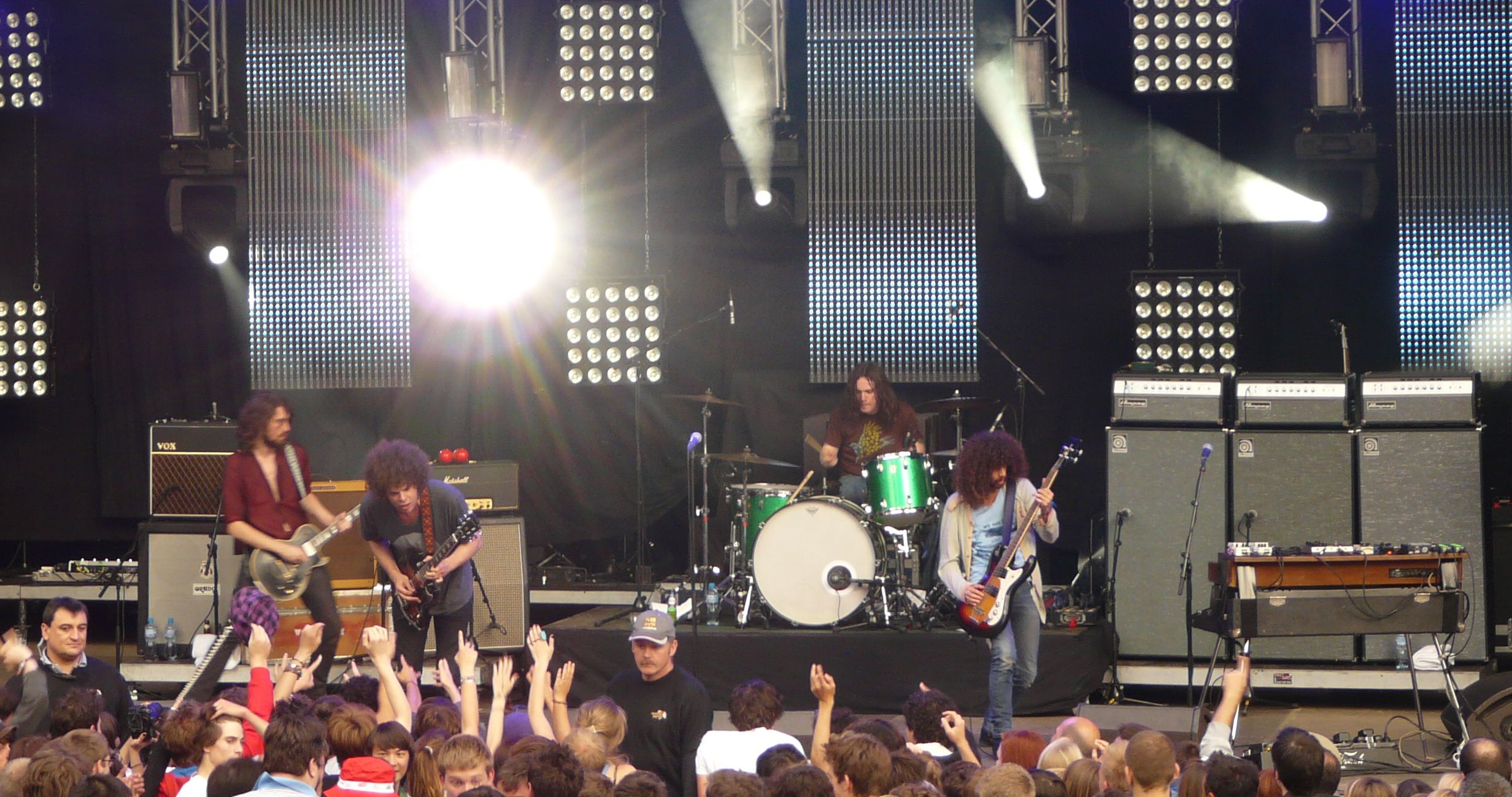
- Wolfmother performing on the main stage of Caribana in 2011
- Status: Active
- Genre: Festival
- Frequency: Annually
- Locations: Crans, Vaud, Switzerland
- Coordinates: 46°21′30″N 6°13′0″E
- Inaugurated: 1990
- Founder: Tony Lerch
- Attendance: 30,500 (2022)
- Website: www.caribana.ch

The Caribana Festival is an annual musical festival taking place over four days in June in Crans, Vaud, Switzerland near Lake Léman. Originally a free, local festival that attracted 2,000 in its inaugural year, the event boasted 30,500 attendees in 2022. Caribana showcases a wide range of music genres under banners of the pop, rock, electro, and rap. International artists who have performed at the festival include Moby, Jessie J, Maroon 5, MIKA, and Evanescence.

== History ==
In May 1983, Nyon hosted a Caribbean Festival, which inspired attendee Tony Lerch to hold a similar event in 1988. Two years later, he and his friends kicked off the inaugural Caribana Festival at the Nautique Club in Crans. The event was organized on a budget of CHF50,000 and attracted 2,000 people over three nights of music. The original event, free to all attendees, focused on Caribbean music and later African music and reggae. The event expanded over the years to include a wider range of genres including pop, rock, electro, and rap.

By 1995, the festival had grown enough in attendance that the organizers were forced to relocate away from the ports at Crans. Still on the lake, but with more space, they were able to open an additional stage, the Lake Stage. This was followed by the Beach Stage, added in 2010, and a private terrace first trialed in 2015 and introduced in 2016. Caribana expanded its offerings from a three-day schedule to a four-day schedule in 2005. In 2013, they introduced Caribateens, a concert on the final day of the festival meant to showcase young, local bands. A Super Smash Bros. tournament, inspired by esports, was planned in 2020 and kicked off in 2022. In 2024, financial troubles forced the festival to move from a volunteer-based model to one managed under Caribana Productions, a public limited company. Caribana founder Tony Lerch remained part of the team.

The event exceeded 20,000 attendees in 2002 and was reported at 32,000 in 2010. Twenty-nine thousand attended the festival in 2019 before Caribana was cancelled for two years due to the COVID-19 pandemic. In 2022, the reopening drew 30,500 people.

Caribana, trente ans les pieds dans l'eau, a book chronicling Caribana's legacy, was published by La Côte journalist Rodolph Haener in 2020.

== Lineups ==
=== 1990s ===
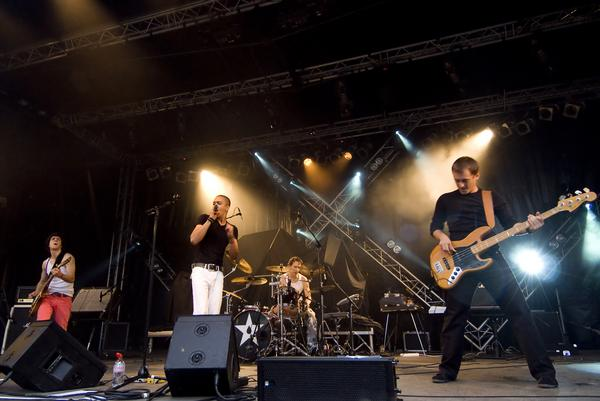
D.o.M (2008)

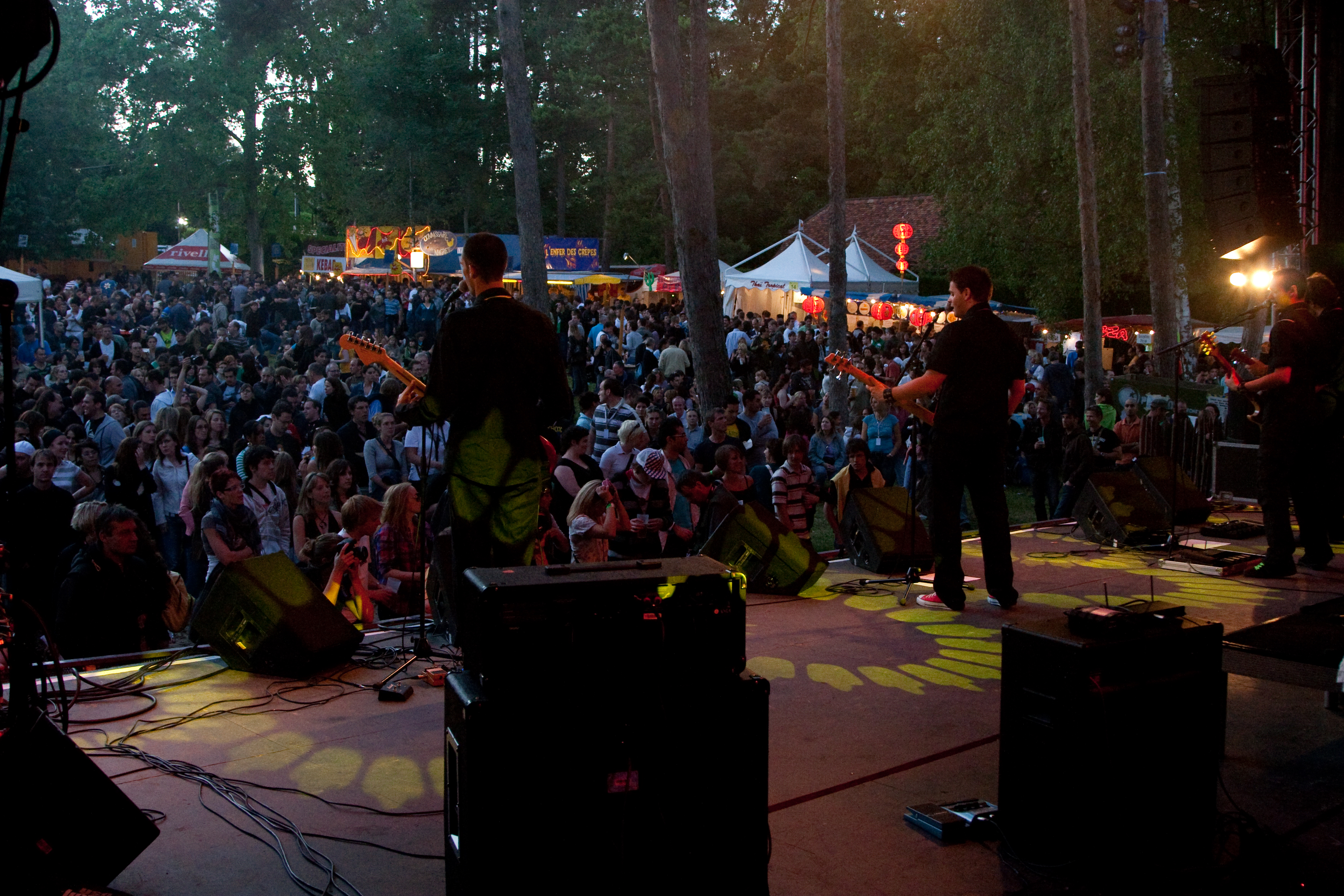
Fullblast (2009)

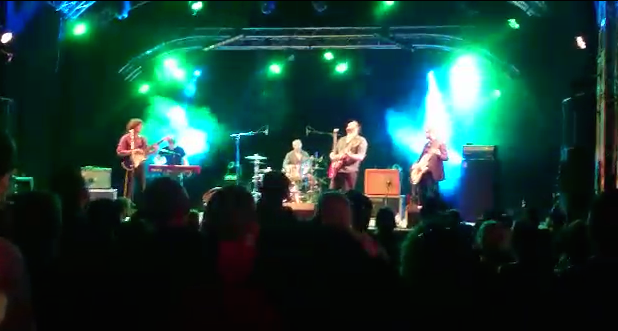
The Crags (2014)

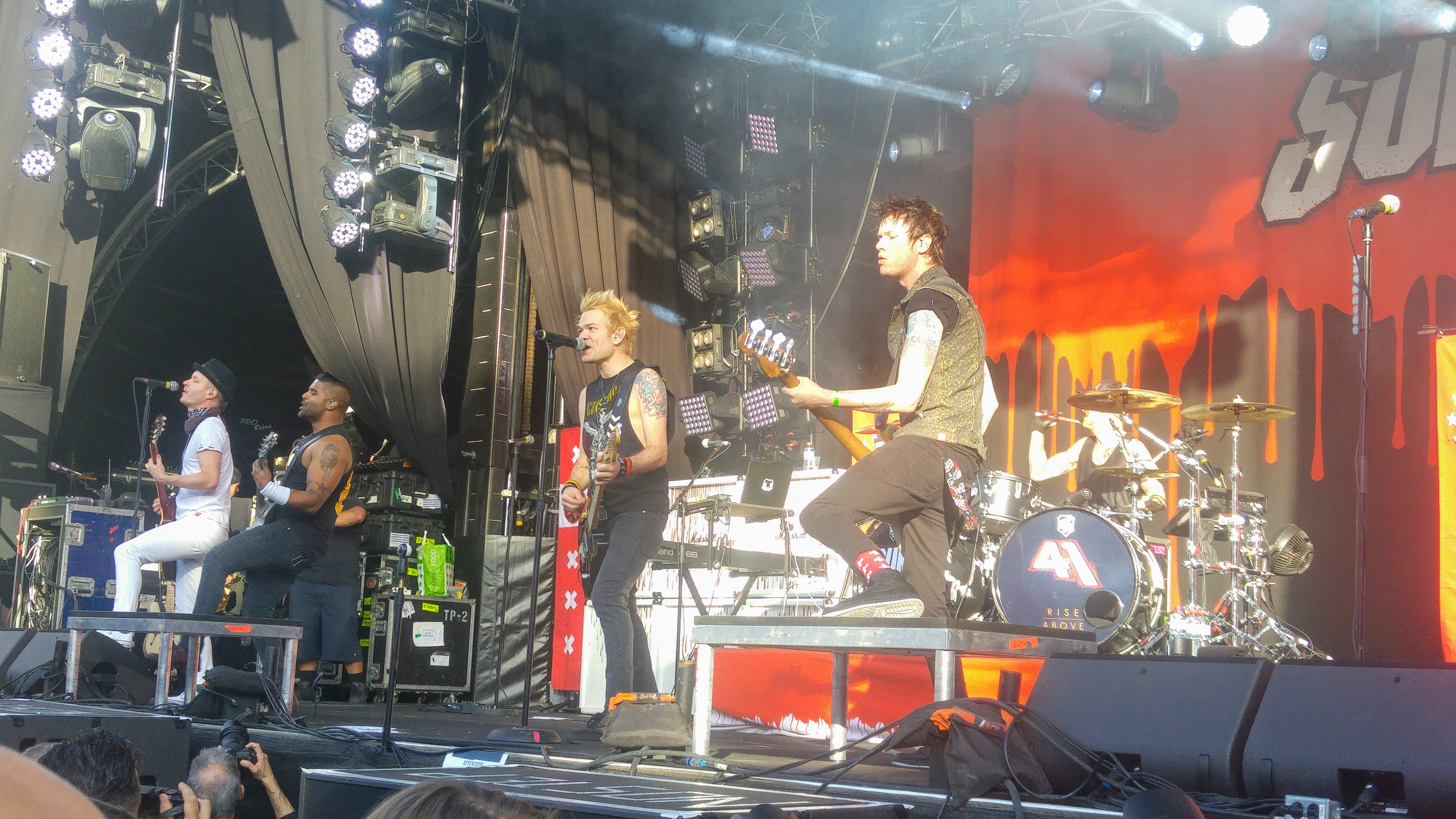
Sum 41 (2017)

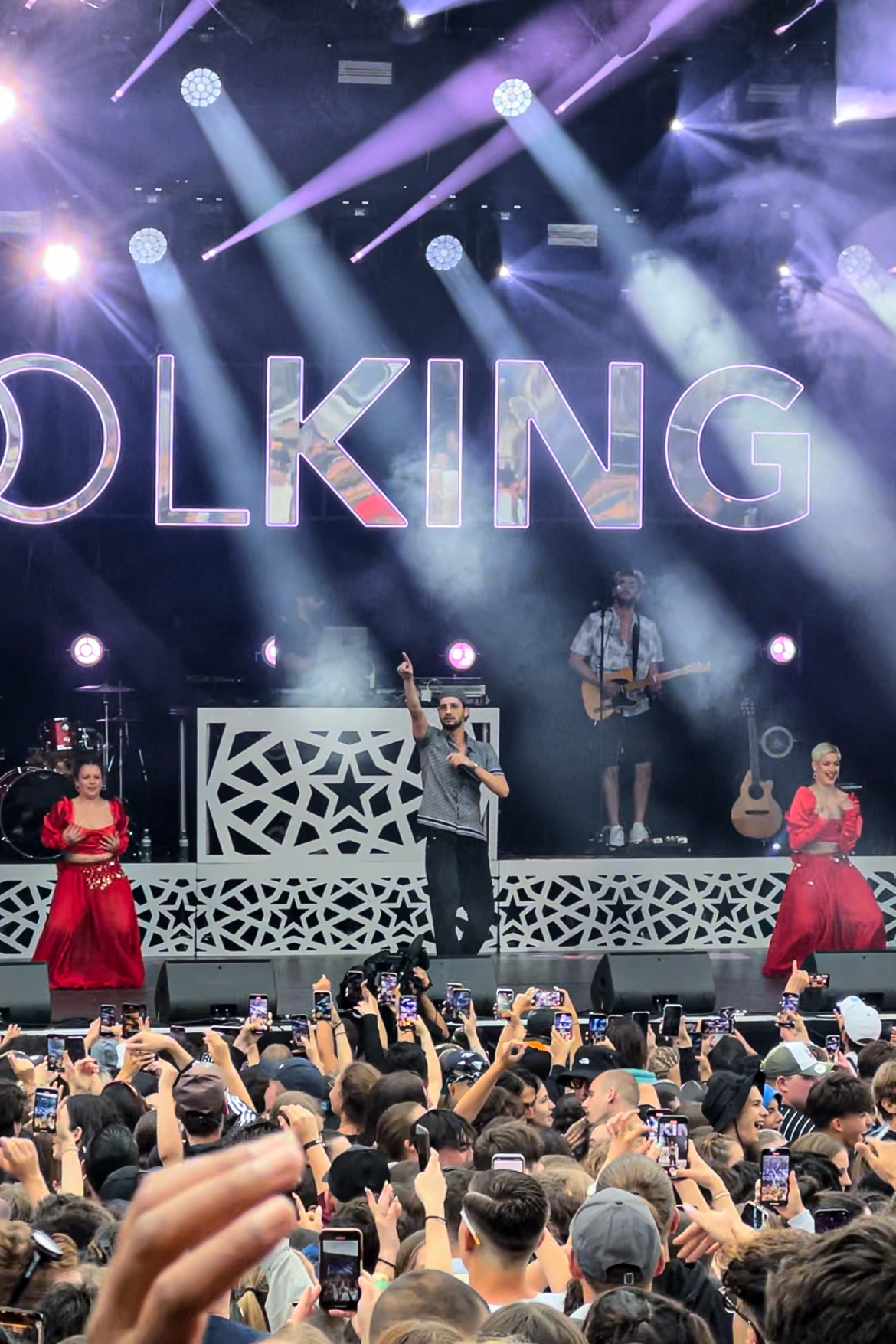
Soolking (2023)

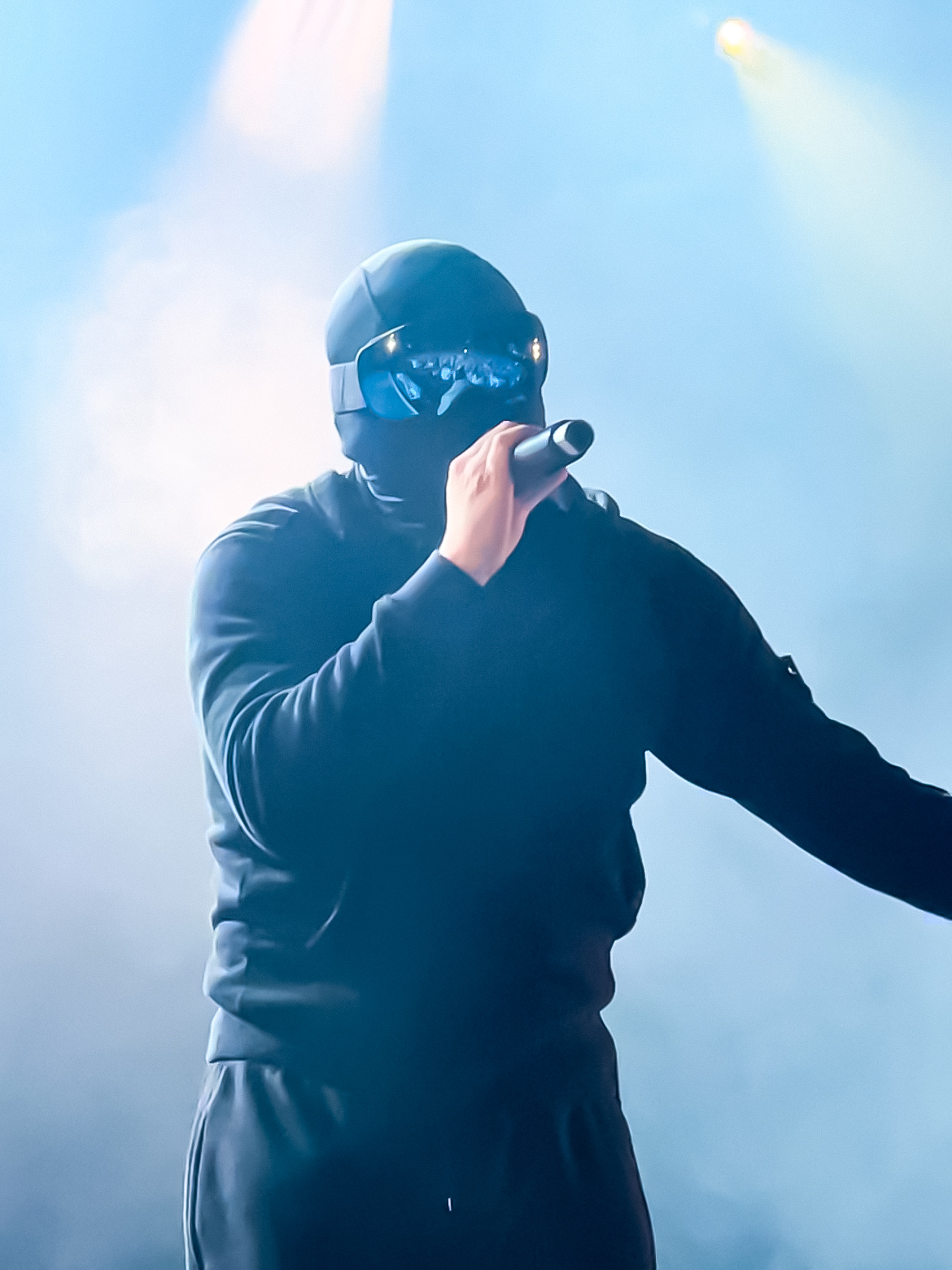
Houdi (2024)

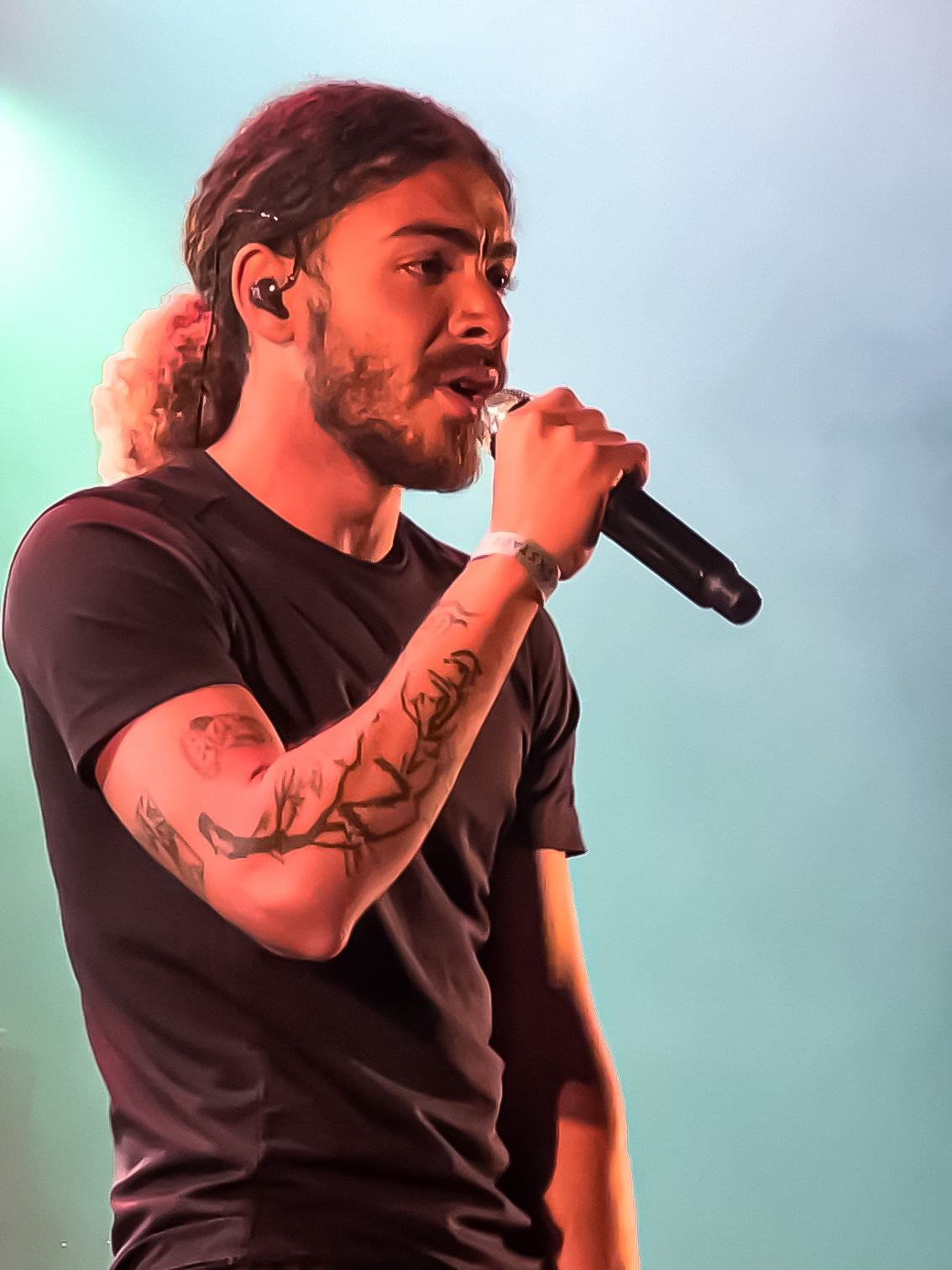
Zamdane (2024)

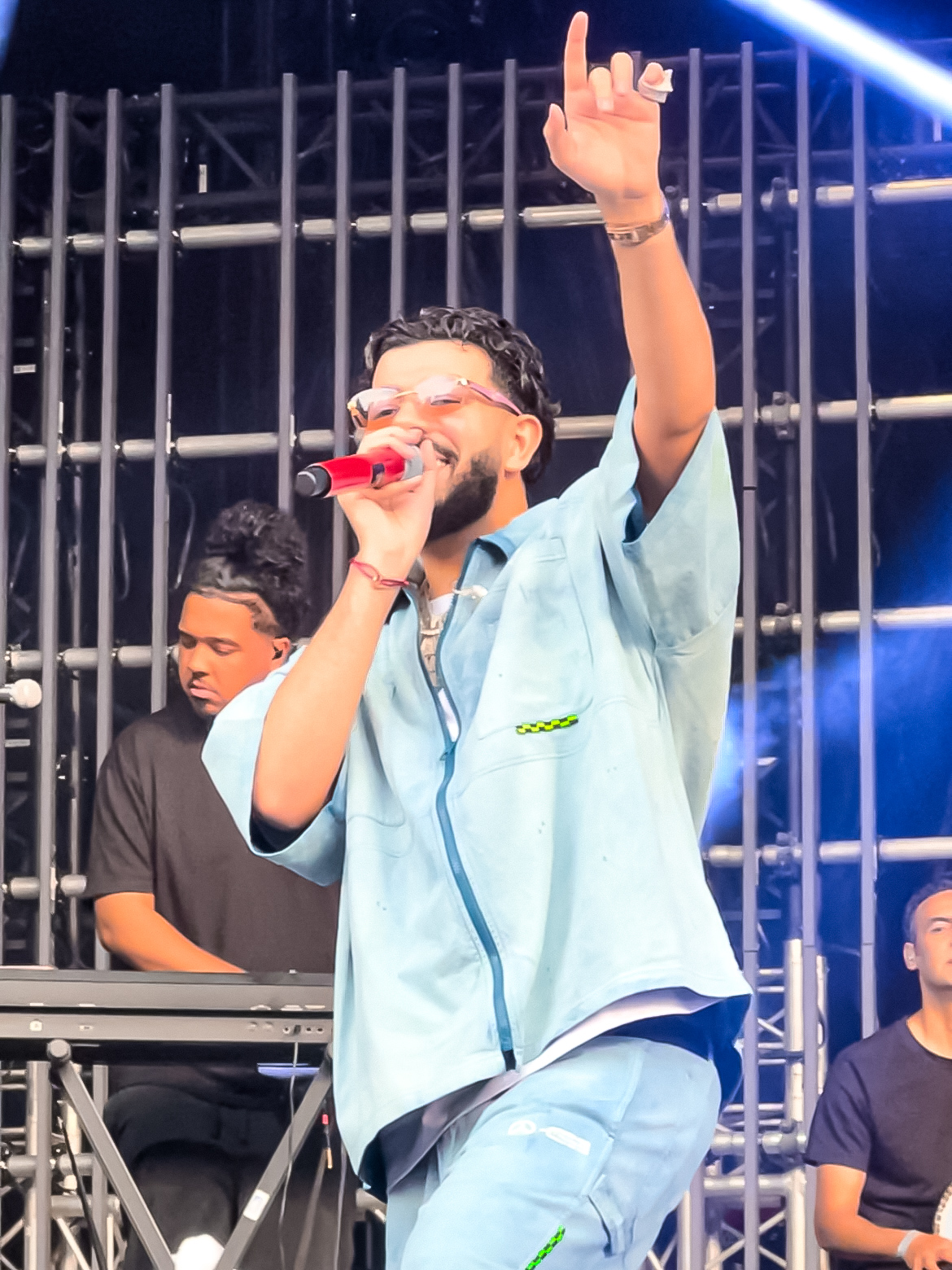
Dystinct (2024)

1990

- 1-3 June: Patrick Chambaz, Manix Band, Sun Set Band, and The Gang

1991

The Caribana committee organized Switzerland's 700th anniversary in Crans-près-Céligny.

1992

- 12 June: No Comment and Sakaryn
- 13 June: Hot Bananas Ladies, Mauro Sabbioni, Of Inimiura, Sa-Kaïl, and The Hedgehogs
- 14 June: Early Morning, Hinterland and Paradox

1993

- 11 June: Arnold the Pig and Totem
- 12 June: C-45, Pacemaker, and Woo Loo Moo Loo
- 13 June: Luka Bloom, Abdul Corr's Saraba, and Taboo

1994

- 17 June: Barking Dogs and Peeping Tom
- 18 June: Human Spirit, La Frontera, and The Ventilators
- 19 June: Metro, Mory Kanté, and The Shoulders

1995

- 8 June: Grand Mother Funk, Malka Family, and Mother Earth
- 9 June: Andy White & The Alt and BUM-Based Upon Movement
- 10 June: Nawari and RudeLuck
- 11 June: Horny Spirits, Laugh, and Zouk Machine
- 4 July: Beverly Jo Scott

1996

- 13 June: FFF, Shane MacGowan, and Wild Mango
- 14 June: Anaemia, Daran et les chaises and Luka Bloom
- 15 June: Gispyland, Pablo U-WA, S'Panic Kiff, and The Blues Brothers Band
- 16 June: Angélique Kidjo

1997

- 12 June: Massimo Massini, Paul Young, and Pull
- 13 June: Calvin Russell, OMC, Sawt el Atlas, and Swiss Cheese
- 14 June: Barrio Chino, O.R.S Massive, Te Vaka, The Silencers, and Zebda
- 15 June: Urban Species

1998

- 4 June: Glen of Guinness, H-Blockx, Ian Brown, Silmarils, and Humbert, Humbert
- 5 June: Core, Dr. John, Papa Fred, Spice
- 6 June: Diana King, Gossip, Monica Lypso, and One for the Road
- 7 June: Verdura Fresca
- 30 June: Faithless
- 1 July: Toots & the Maytals

1999

- 3 June: Anouk, Blankass, CrawlinKingsnake, and Yves Z.
- 4 June: Babylon Circus, Carole Fredericks, Keb Mo, Noï, and The Creatures
- 5 June: Alabina, Jiripoca, Mob's et Travaux, Sens Unik, and Touré Kunda
- 6 June: The Twinkle Brothers

=== 2000s ===
2000

- 22 June: Afro Cuban All Stars, Daran, Delphine, P18, Favez, and Sam Seale
- 23 June: Aswad, Bonny B., Lyn©, Zapping Buzz Band, and Zorg
- 24 June: Amadou et Mariam, Andy Smith, Björn Again, Kid Creole and the Coconuts, Laugh, Small Fry, and Spectron
- 25 June: DJ Morpheus and Paco Sery

2001

- 14 June: Ciderman, Daytona, K's Choice, and Phoenix
- 15 June: Glen of Guinness, Liquido, Liz Libido, Popa Chubby, and thePark
- 16 June: Lunazone, Ones, Pedro Luís e a Parede, Sergent Garcia, and Steel Pulse
- 17 June: Alpha Blondy

2002

- 13 June: Beverley Knight, Dada (ante portas), Guess What, and Matt
- 14 June: Natalia M. King, Marianne Faithfull, Bryan Ferry, Gee K., Morocco, and Sinclair
- 15 June: Chewy and Chitty Chitty Bang Bang
- 16 June: Khaled, Orishas, and Sonalp
- 17 June: Sinsemilia; Caribakids event

2003

- 12 June: Astonvilla, Saybia, Tim Patience Watch, Tom McRae, and Zorg
- 13 June: Clawfinger, Gigi Moto, Lee Perry, Napoleon Washington, Patrice, and Polar
- 14 June: Earth Wind & Fire Experience, Émilie Simon, Fargo, Magic System, Popmonster, and Saïan Supa Crew
- 15 June: Zebda

2004

- 10 June: Dolly, Nickelback, Sarah Bettens, Supergrass, and The Underwater
- 11 June: Magicrays, Paul Personne, Paul Quadri, Red, and Simple Minds
- 12 June: Corneille, Jammin, Kamilean, Kinky, Open Season and Yuri Buenaventura
- 13 June: The Peter Tosh Celebration

2005

- 8 June: Moby and Les palabres bleues
- 9 June: Bluedaze, Lovebugs, Luke, Mass Hysteria, and Mouss et Hakim
- 10 June: Demilliac, Eagle-Eye Cherry, Jimmy Cliff, Lima Djari, Oni/Epik, Papa Roach, and Patatas Chipas Club
- 11 June: Gingala, Izul, Magyd Cherfi, and Natasha Bedingfield
- 12 June: Morcheeba

2006

- 8 June: Archive, Kandlbauer, and Phoenix
- 9 June: Jamait, Kalash, Lole, Mattafix, Skin, and Starsailor
- 10 June: Angélique Kidjo, Jarabe De Palo, Mosquito, Nelly Furtado, Skye, and Sunshiners|Sunshiners
- 11 June: Sergent Garcia

2007

- 7 June: Good Charlotte, Myband, The Passengers, and Piers Faccini
- 8 June: Aloan, Babet, Evanescence, The Servant, and Patti Smith
- 9 June: Faudel, Macy Gray, Israel Vibration, Sally Nyolo, Lunik, and Solo Dos
- 10 June: The Brand New Heavies

2008

- 4 June
  - Main stage: Alanis Morissette and Mina feat. Mich Gerber
  - Side stage: Simongad
- 5 June
  - Main stage: Simple Plan, Stereophonics, and Manic Street Preachers
  - Side stage: Atomic Shelters, Redwood, and The Young Gods
- 6 June
  - Main stage: Kate Nash, Keziah Jones, Patrice, and Infadels
  - Side stage: Admiral T, D.o.M, and bconnected
- 7 June
  - Main stage: Mademoiselle K, Maroon 5, and Boy George
  - Side stage: Laure Perret, Sumo, and My Federation

2009

- 10 June
  - Main stage: Lovebugs and ZZ Top
  - Side stages: Duff McKagan's Loaded and Kris Dane
  - DJs: Sancho, Niko, Oktay / Robbie Del Wax, and Matt Kay
- 11 June
  - Main stage: Editors, Travis, and Chris Cornell
  - Side stages: Wipe Out, Fullblast, and Poni Hoax, Fink and Fuse Factory
  - DJs: INDIEpenDANCE, Laura Leishman, and Erony & Matthew Freeman
- 12 June
  - Main stage: Dub Incorporation, Madcon, Stress, and UB40
  - Side stages: Junior Tshaka, Tweek, Nneka, Sand, Hindi Zahra, and Project5
- 13 June
  - Main stage: Dan Black, Katy Perry, Charlie Winston, and Thomas Dutronc
  - Side stages: Victori4, Dorian Gray, Yoav, Licia Chery, Krystle Warren, and Krash on Earth
  - DJs: Phidrix, Sancho, and Jeckyll and Hyde
- 14 June - Caribakids
  - Side stages: Les Halluciments and GAËTAN

=== 2010s ===
2010

- 9 June:
  - Main stage: The Baseballs and Deep Purple
  - Side stage: Hell's Kitchen
- 10 June:
  - Main stage: Sum 41, OneRepublic, and Thirty Seconds to Mars
  - Side stages: Stevans|Stevans, Polar, and Charlie
- 11 June:
  - Main stage: Micky Green and Faithless
  - Side stages: Yodelice, The Asteroids Galaxy Tour, Thomas Dybdahl, and Ralf Hartmann
- 12 June:
  - Main stage: Moonraisers, Sean Paul, and Madness
  - Side stages: Luka Bloom, Mama Rosin, Lea Lu, and Neil Halstead

2011

- 8 June
  - Main Stage: Justin Nozuka and Texas
  - Side stages: Kirsty, Lissie, and Marc Sway
  - DJs: Phidrix / Sancho and Vkee & Guigui
- 9 June
  - Main stage: Wolfmother, Interpol, and Hurts
  - Side stages: Kassidy, Favez, Plain White T's, Misty Miller, and Azazelblue's Earthworm
  - DJs: Jerome Miller / Jambon Beurre and DJ Phil
- 10 June
  - Main stage: Plan B, Morcheeba, and OMD
  - Side stages: Solange La Frange, Guess What, Little Dragon, Ndidi O, and Guillaume Grand
  - DJs: Sancho / DJ Mando, Philip Morax
- 11 June
  - Main stage: Julian Marley, Abd al Malik, Kool and the Gang
  - Side stages: Saint André, Medi, I blame Coco, Jaïlyna, and Ben Howard
  - DJs: Jerome Miller / Nico, Fred Lilla
- 12 June
  - Caribakids

2012

- 6 June
  - Main stage: Pony Pony Run Run and Gossip
  - Side stages: Kyasma, The Rambling Wheels, Motherrockers, and The Cyborgs
- 7 June
  - Main stage: Everlast, Gorillaz Sound System, and Kasabian
  - Side stages: Lou Lesage, Revolver, Marina and the Diamonds, Lucy Rose, and Haight Ashbury
- 8 June
  - Main stage: Dropkick Murphys, Lou Reed, and The Specials
  - Side stages: The Minutes, Pegasus, Stephen Marley, Lail Arad, and Jennie Abrahamson
- 9 June
  - Main stage: Grand Corps Malade, Keziah Jones, and 2manydjs
  - Side stages: Elkee, Vintage Trouble, Raphelson, Foy Vance, and Charlie Winston

2013

- 5 June
  - Main stage: The Kills and Skunk Anansie
  - Side stages: Kill It Kid, The Animen, and The Coronas
- 6 June
  - Main stage: 77 Bombay Street, Archive, and Kaiser Chiefs
  - Side stages: Take Me Home, Andy Burrows, and The Heavy
- 7 June:
  - Main stage: Raggasonic, Sexion d'Assaut, and Tinie Tempah
  - Side stages: Aya Waska, Tarrus Riley, and Birdy Nam Nam
- 8 June:
  - Main stage: Fun. and Zaz
  - Side stages: Célien Schneider, Imagine Dragons, and The Jim Jones Revue

2014

- June 4
  - Main stage: Ska-P and Pixies
  - Side stages: Blood Red Shoes, The Pretty Reckless, George Barnett, Polar Circles, The Crags, and Aliose
  - DJs: Le Petite Putain, Mike Arthur Le Trèfle, and DJ Sancho
- June 5
  - Main stage: Kodaline, Miles Kane, and Queens of the Stone Age
  - DJs: Xinobi, Keiko Was Great, and Mr. Chug
- 6 June:
  - Main stage: Youssoupha, Jessie J, and IAM
  - Side stages: Ska Nerfs, Naughty Boy, and Rootwords
  - DJs: DJ Vidy, Deadboyz, DJives, DJ Nico, Woody and Buzz, DJ Joachim, and We Love Machines
- 7 June
  - Main stage: Bastian Baker, Passenger, and Tom Odell
  - Side stages: Stu Larsen, Jan Oliver, Max Romeo, Kadebostany, Lazercat, and Ezekiel
  - DJs: Daniel Cooper, Jack v, Keiko Was Great, and DJ Phidrix
- 8 June - Caribateens
  - DJs: Jack Holiday

2015

- 3 June: Kill It Kid, Skip The Use, Marilyn Manson, John Dear, John J. Presley, and Eluveitie
- 4 June: Metronomy, Bastille, Parov Stelar Band, Elvett, The Strypes, and The Avener
- 5 June: Ben l'Oncle Soul, Gentleman, John Newman, The Bloody Beetroots, Colveen, Danakil, and Cee-Roo
- 6 June: Selah Sue, The Cardigans, Marlon Roudette, Boston Bun & Feadz, Carrousel, Peace, and William White
- 7 June: Marcos Cabanas, Jetlakes, MIKA, and James Gruntz

2016

- 1 June: Yellow Teeth, Worry Blast, Amy Macdonald, Breaking Benjamin, Garbage, and The Chikitas
- 2 June:
  - Main stage: Primal Scream, James Bay, and The Kooks
  - Side stages: Emilie Zoé, Foy Vance, and Broken Back
  - DJs: Puma, Garance, La Forêt, Mimetic, Mr. Chug, and DJ Rouni
- 3 June
  - Main stage: K's Choice, Jungle, and Kadebostany
  - Side stages: Lost Frequencies, Junior Tshaka, Pony Pony Run Run, and FlexFab
  - DJs: Charles Azna, Tanua, Alex Scott, A-Dess, and DJ Nico
- 4 June
  - Main stage: Nneka, James Morrison, and Crystal Fighters
  - Side stages: Feder, Le Roi Angus, Puts Marie, The Bohicas, and Oxmo Puccino
  - DJs: Djives, Keiko Was Great, NOUS, Sledgehead Bristol, Daniel Cooper, Krøne, and DJ Bobetso
- 5 June
  - Main stage: Huge Puppies, Alejandro Reyes, and Maître Gims

2017

- 7 June: Sum 41, Evanescence, Cold Bath, Rag'n'Bone Man, Hathors, Moulitz, Benito, Adolpho & Franky, Mr. Chug, Djives vs DJ Nico
- 8 June: Le Beau Lac De Bâle, Roger Hodgson, Foreigner, Pat Burgener, Fai Baba, VANT, Bib-San, La Pièce & Y/M, Albert & Hofmann, Temiri, Mr. Mike, and Collectif Hapax 21
- 9 June: Klingande, Fakear, Kungs, Klischée, Gramatik, Madeon, Dub Side, Groggizz, O'Hana, Limited Brothers, Mr. Chug, and DJ Phidrix
- 10 June: Yaniss Odua & Artikal Band, L.E.J, Wyclef Jean, Holax, Macaô, Ira May, Møme, DJ Rouni, DJ Seb, DJ Phidrix, Tic&Tac ft. AVF, and DJ Nico vs Djives
- 11 June: The Bonny Situation, Álvaro Soler, Berywam, and Bigflo & Oli

2018

- 5 June: Fabian Tharin, Aliose, and Patrick Bruel
- 6 June: The Last Moan, Eluveitie, Mat Bastard, Status Quo, and Ecca Vandal
- 7 June: Wintershome, Wildwood Kin, The Gardener & The Tree, Passenger, All Them Witches, and Simple Minds
- 8 June: Ofenbach, WUGS, Booka Shade, Polo & Pan, Skin, and Petit Biscuit
- 9 June: Yall, Saint City Orchestra, Protoje & The Indiggnation, Naâman, Oscar and the Wolf, Danitsa, and The Script

2019

- 5 June: Trois Cafés gourmands, Boulevard des airs, Franz Ferdinand, Barns Courtney, The Limiñanas, Jeanne Added, Jean Charles De Monte Carlo, Mo' Funka Incorporation, and Fermecat
- 6 June: Bastian Baker, Kodaline, Morcheeba, Marius Bear, Midnight, Agar Agar, Chloe Martinez, La Bohème, Garance b2b DJ Puma, Djives, Phidrix.
- 7 June: Caravan Palace, Synapson, Robin Schulz, Kazy Lambist, Monumental Men, Vitalic, 3rd Floor Brothers, Tony D'A, Opuswerk, Mr. Chug, Conor McFeely, and TicTacTec
- 8 June: Vegedream, Ninho, Vald, Blu Samu, Di-Meh, Georgio, Sofiane, Keikowasgreat, CCSA x Hapax 21, Mr. Mike, DJ Vldy.
- 9 June: Les Négresses Vertes, Skip The Use, Nekfeu, Improvizanyon, Ella Soto, Dewolph x Perla Perlson & Crew, Kream, Nilou, Pylone, KØLD, Rouni, DJ Cauls Beats, and DJ Nico

=== 2020s ===
2020

Caribana 2020 was originally scheduled 16-20 June and the schedule was released, but the festival was ultimately cancelled due to the COVID-19 pandemic.

- 17 June (rock/metal): The Offspring, Powerwolf, Promethee, Hey Satan, and Mama Jefferson
- 18 June (pop-rock): 5 Seconds of Summer, Travis, Deluxe, Broken Bridge, and EDEN
- 19 June (electro): Jax Jones, Fritz Kalkbrenner, Étienne de Crécy, Rudimental, Riton, SebastiAn, and Jessiquoi
- 20 June (rap): Lomepal, Maes, PRIME, Moha La Squale, Sim's, WolfGang, and Badnaiy
- 21 June: Lost Frequencies

2021

Cancelled due to continued COVID precautions and rescheduled for 2022.

2022

- 15 June (rock): The Offspring, Powerwolf, Promethee, grandson, Holding Absence, and Ad Infinitum
- 16 June (pop): MIKA, Louane, Klischée, Oscar Anton, BARON.E, and Sophie De Quay
- 17 June (electro): Fatboy Slim, Meduza, Myd, Riton, Boston Bun, Jessiquoi, and La Colère
- 18 June (rap): PLK, Maes, Soso Maness, Wolfgang, KT Gorique, Naomi Lareine, and Younès
- 19 June: Closing concert

2023

- 7 June: Sum 41, Nothing but Thieves, Flogging Molly, Blind Channel, Dirty Sound Magnet, and Dreamshade
- 8 June: Christophe Willem, Suzane, Tryo, MC Solaar, Izïa, and Gjon's Tears
- 9 June: SCH, Djadja & Dinaz, Blaiz Fayah, Soolking, Mara, Captains of the Imagination, and Chelan
- 10 June: Bob Sinclar, Bomel, Hyphen Hyphen, Lost Frequencies, LyOsun, Merzeg, and Mosimann

2024

- 5 June (rock):
  - Main stage: Parkway Drive and Cassyette
  - Side stages: Bob Vylan, Cure for the Ghost, and Unpeople
- 6 June (pop):
  - Main stage: Birdy, Raphaël, and Tom Odell
  - Side stages: Adèle Castillon, Nnavy, and Sam Ryder
- 7 June (rap):
  - Main stage: Dinos, Dystinct, and SDM
  - Side stages: Houdi, Mairo, So La Lune, and Zamdane
- 8 June (electro):
  - Main stage: Étienne de Crécy b2b Boombass b2b DJ Falcon, Martin Solveig, and Ofenbach
  - Side stages: Kadebostany, Luude, Netsky, and Orphia

2025

- 4 June: The Prodigy, Royal Republic, Eastwood, Mass Hysteria, Poppy, and House of Protection
- 5 June: Air, Sofiane Pamart, Vendredi sur Mer, Malik Djoudi, Yodelice, Théodora, Jolagreen23, Wallace Cleaver, and Dalí
- 6 June: DJ Alan Walker, Kungs, Polo & Pan, Kavinsky, Marie Jay, Swimming Paul, and Cassius

2026

Caribana 2026 hosted 32,000 attendees from 17 to 20 June.

- 17 June: Kendji Girac, M. Pokora, Marine, Nâdiya, Deluxe, DJ Cort-S, Manua & OneTwo, Strange Tree, George and Lucas, Tanguy Zaï, Sun J, DJ Saint Xavier, DJ Chris, Linda Rao, Zahär, Zemzem
- 18 June: MIKA, Louane, Yoa, Broken Back, Eve, Saint Stacy, Club Katel, Garance, DISOUL, Alan Junior, MOYAA, DJ Alf, Julian Johnson, DJ Bigstone, Zahär
- 19 June (rap): Niska, KeBlack, La Rvfleuze, Soolking, Genezio, Maureen, A6el, No Bad Party, The Grape, Eretria, Kami, GWISE, DJ ByJoh, Alan Bolumar, Zahär
- 20 June (electronic): Lost Frequencies, Trinix, Purple Disco Machine, Étienne de Crécy, A-Trak, Myd, LEILA, Collectif 52, DJ Laxxiste A., Skevø, Bash DJ, BEN BREDER, AY3L, Tanguy Zaï, Greg'N'Sax, Modesta, Zahär

2027

Caribana 2027 is scheduled for 16 to 19 June 2027.
