= Greenfield Festival =

Music festival in Switzerland

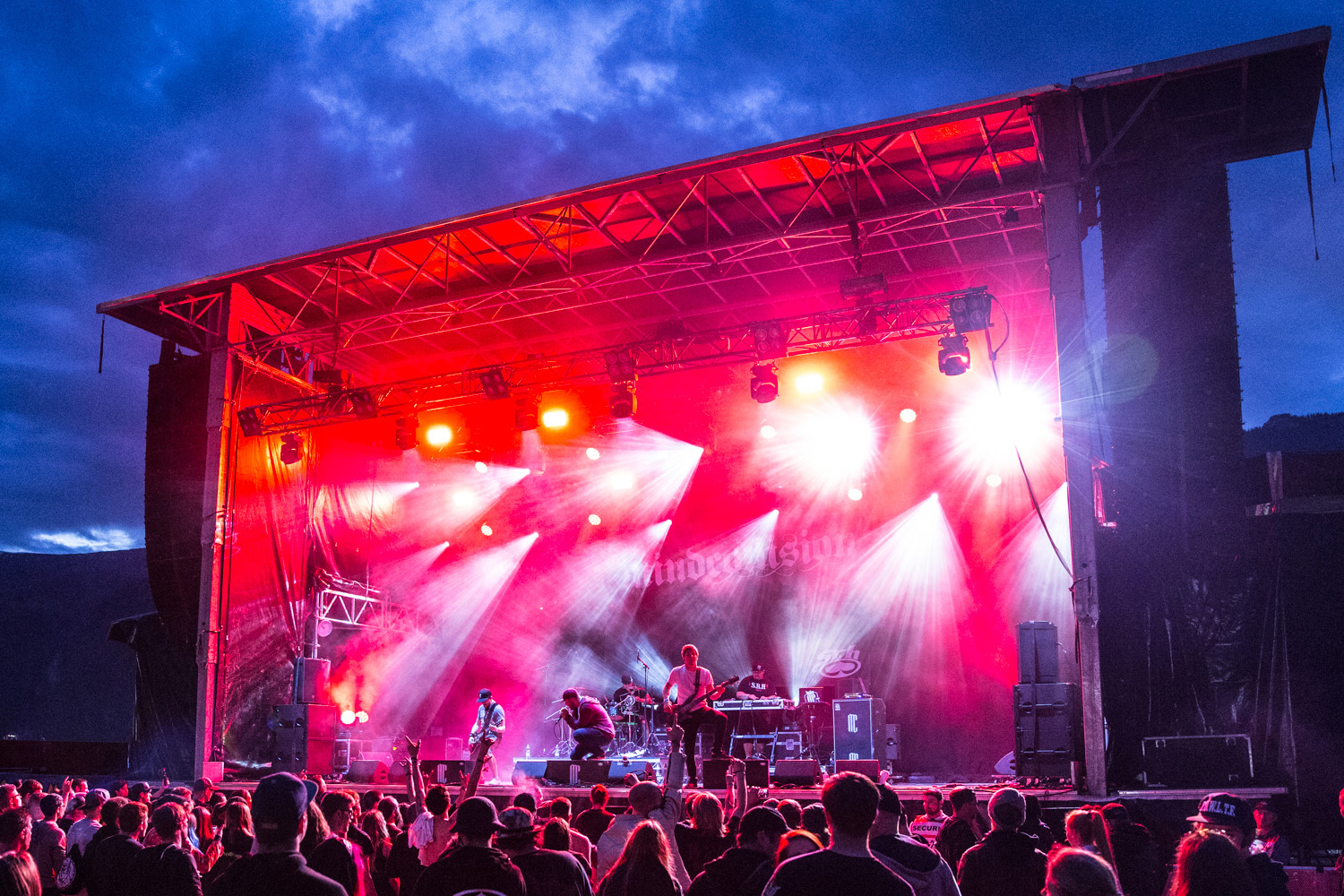
- Genre: Rock, punk rock, alternative rock, heavy metal
- Dates: Mid-June
- Locations: Interlaken, Switzerland
- Website: www.greenfieldfestival.ch

The Greenfield Festival is an annual rock music festival held on the outskirts of the town of Interlaken, in the Swiss canton of Bern. The festival was established in 2005 and attracts up to 30,000 visitors per year.

== Editions ==
=== 2005 ===
- Date: 24–26 June 2005
- Visitors: 25,500

Line-up:

- Adam Green
- Aereogramme
- Alter Bridge
- Boss Martians
- Breed 77
- Bright Eyes
- Burrell
- Clawfinger
- De-Phazz
- Die Toten Hosen
- Donots
- Eagles of Death Metal
- The Eighties Matchbox B-Line Disaster
- Element of Crime
- Fantômas
- Favez
- Feeder
- Finch
- Flogging Molly
- Giant Sand
- Goldenhorse
- Grannysmith
- Green Day
- Jimmy Eat World
- Kettcar
- La Vela Puerca
- Madrugada
- Madsen
- Melody Club
- Millencolin
- Moondog Show
- Nguru (short term for the failed Mars Volta)
- Pennywise
- Shilf
- Simple Plan
- Slut
- Snitch
- System of a Down
- The (International) Noise Conspiracy
- The Faint
- The Hellacopters
- The Mars Volta
- Turbonegro

The performances by Nine Inch Nails and Queens of the Stone Age had to be canceled because of bad weather.

=== 2006 ===
- Date: 16–18 June 2006
- Visitors: 20,000

Line-up:

- A.F.
- Amplifier
- Apocalyptica
- Archie Bronson Outfit
- Archive
- Art Brut
- Babyshambles (canceled)
- Backyard Babies
- Billy Talent
- Depeche Mode
- dEUS
- Donots
- Elbow
- Hard-Fi
- In Extremo
- Karamelo Santo
- Kashmir
- Lagwagon
- Live
- Mad Caddies
- Maxïmo Park
- Nguru
- Pale
- Panteón Rococó
- Placebo
- Redwood
- Seeed
- Speck
- Starsailor
- The Answer
- The Cardigans
- The Datsuns
- The Delilahs
- The Peacocks
- The Sisters of Mercy
- The Soundtrack of Our Lives
- The Weepies
- Therapy?
- Tool
- Trivium
- System of a Down
- William White & The Emergency

=== 2007 ===
- Date: 15–17 June 2007
- Visitors: 24,848

Line-up:

- Thirty Seconds to Mars
- Cataract
- Die Happy
- dredg
- Five O’Clock Heroes
- Flogging Molly
- Frank Black
- Hayseed Dixie
- Head Automatica
- Hinder (canceled)
- Houston Swing Engine
- Ill Niño
- Incubus
- Itchy Poopzkid
- Juliette and the Licks
- La Vela Puerca
- Less Than Jake
- Madsen
- Manic Street Preachers
- Marilyn Manson
- McQueen
- Me First and the Gimme Gimmes
- My Chemical Romance (canceled)
- Navel
- Porcupine Tree
- Queens of the Stone Age
- Reel Big Fish
- Slayer
- Snitch
- Sonic Youth
- Stone Sour
- Sugarplum Fairy
- The 69 Eyes
- The Films
- The Hives
- The Killers
- The Lemonheads
- The Smashing Pumpkins
- Therapy?
- Tomte

=== 2008 ===
- Date: 13–15 June 2008
- Visitors: 26,218

Line-up:

- 3 Doors Down (canceled, substitute: Heaven Shall Burn)
- Apocalyptica
- Bad Religion (as a replacement for Linkin Park)
- Beatsteaks
- Black Rebel Motorcycle Club
- Blackmail
- Bullet for My Valentine
- Coheed and Cambria
- Die Ärzte
- Donots
- Enter Shikari
- Funeral for a Friend (canceled)
- Heaven Shall Burn
- In Extremo
- In Flames
- Jaguar Love
- Kettcar
- Kilians
- Linkin Park (due to illness of guitarist short canceled)
- Millencolin
- NOFX
- Oceansize
- Panteón Rococó
- Reign of Silence
- Rise Against
- Schwellheim
- Sick of It All
- Slut
- The Bianca Story
- The Blackout
- The Donnas
- The Offspring
- The Weakerthans
- Zebrahead
- Zox

=== 2009 ===
- Date: 12–14 June 2009
- Visitors: n/a

Line-up:

- A Day to Remember
- ...And You Will Know Us by the Trail of Dead
- Animal Kingdom
- August Burns Red
- Billy Talent
- Broilers
- Caliban
- Cataract
- Disturbed
- Dredg
- Dryconditions
- Faith No More
- Flogging Molly
- Future of the Left
- Gallows
- Gogol Bordello
- Guano Apes
- Horse the Band
- Itchy Poopzkid
- Karamelo Santo
- Korn
- Less Than Jake
- Lovedrug
- Monster Magnet
- Neimo (as a replacement for Face to Face)
- Nightwish
- Parkway Drive
- Shinedown
- Slipknot
- Social Distortion
- Soulfly
- Staind
- Tomte
- Trivium
- The Blackbox Revelation
- The Krupa Case
- The Subways
- The Temper Trap
- The Ting Tings
- The Wombats
- Volbeat

=== 2010 ===
- Date : 11–13 June 2010

Line-Up:

- Beatsteaks
- Bleeding Through
- Blessed by a Broken Heart
- Callejon
- Coheed and Cambria
- Crime in Stereo
- Danko Jones
- Donots
- Eluveitie
- General Fiasco
- Goodbye Fairbanks
- Grannysmith
- Hatebreed
- Heaven Shall Burn
- HIM
- Hot Water Music
- Juliette Lewis
- LoveHateHero
- Mad Sin
- Neaera
- Panteón Rococó
- Porcupine Tree
- Rammstein
- Subway to Sally
- The Beauty of Gemina
- The Dillinger Escape Plan
- The Hives
- The Peacocks
- The Prodigy
- The Used
- Turbostaat
- Unheilig
- WIZO

=== 2011 ===
- Date : 09–11 June 2011

Line-Up:

- Adept
- After the Burial
- All Time Low
- Anti-Flag
- Apocalyptica
- BoySetsFire
- Broilers
- Bullet for My Valentine
- Caliban
- Callejon (as a replacement for Alesana)
- Comeback Kid
- Converge
- Dredg
- Escapado
- Favez
- Framing Hanley
- Frank Turner
- Flogging Molly
- Foo Fighters
- Fuckup
- Itchy Poopzkid
- Kvelertak
- Lacuna Coil
- Long Distance Calling
- Madsen
- Navel
- Parkway Drive
- Sick of It All
- Silverstein
- Social Distortion
- Sublime with Rome
- Suicide Silence
- System of a Down
- The Dreadnoughts
- The Gaslight Anthem
- The Ocean
- The Rambling Wheels
- The Sorrow (as a replacement for All Shall Perish)
- The Young Gods
- Volbeat
- We Butter the Bread with Butter
- Wolfmother
- Young Guns

=== 2012 ===
- Date : 15–17 June 2012

Line-Up:

- Die Ärzte
- Limp Bizkit
- The Offspring
- Rise Against
- Billy Talent
- In Flames
- The Hives
- Skindred
- Refused
- In Extremo
- Heaven Shall Burn
- Sepultura
- Eluveitie
- Hatebreed
- Lagwagon
- Schandmaul
- Fear Factory
- Enter Shikari
- Pennywise
- Mad Caddies
- Hot Water Music
- Zebrahead
- Less Than Jake
- Black Veil Brides
- H-Blockx
- La Vela Puerca
- Donots
- Street Dogs
- All Shall Perish
- Neaera
- The Bronx
- Darkest Hour
- The Beauty of Gemina
- Emmure
- Bury Tomorrow
- La Dispute
- Talco
- Wolves Like Us
- While She Sleeps
- Turbowolf
- Death by Chocolate
- Hathors
- Delilahs
- Breakdown of Sanity
- Make Me a Donut (Facebook-contest winner)
- End (Bscene-contest winner)
- Fathead (Restorm-contest winner)
