= Djadja =

Djadja may refer to:

- "Djadja" (song), 2018 song by Malian singer Aya Nakamura
- Djadja, French rapper part of the French hip hop duo Djadja & Dinaz

== See also ==
- Djadjawurrung or Dja Dja Wurrung, a native Aboriginal tribe in Australia
