= Dinaz =

Dinaz may refer to:

- Dinaz, part of the French hip hop duo Djadja & Dinaz
- FC Dinaz Vyshhorod, a Ukrainian professional football club from Vyshhorod
