= Goy Ogalde =

Goy Karamelo
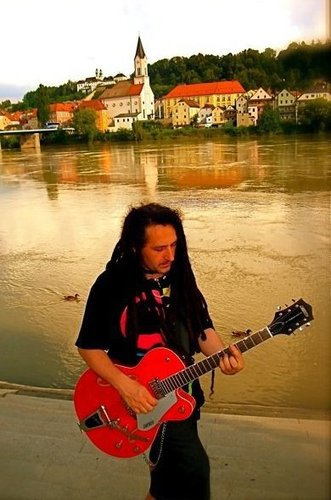

Background information
- Also known as: Guille
- Born: Guillermo Andrés Ogalde Gluzman; January 26, 1967 (age 59); Mendoza, Argentine
- Genres: Ska, punk, jazz, reggae, Latin, rock, alternative
- Occupations: Musician, record producer
- Instruments: Voice, guitar, bass, keyboard
- Years active: 1992–present
- Labels: DLN (US); K Industrias (France); Pop Art
- Website: / www.goykaramelo.com/karamelosantook

Goy Karamelo (born Guillermo Andres Ogalde Gluzman on January 26, 1966, in Godoy Cruz, Mendoza, Argentina) is an Argentinian folk singer of Jewish origin (Romanian and German). He sings in Spanish, English, and occasionally in other languages. Karamelo began his musical career with Perfectos Idiotas, an Argentinian group that combined several musical styles and languages. He founded the band Karamelo Santo in 1993, and became a solo artist after its breakup in 2009.

== Early life ==
Goy Karamelo a musician, songwriter, producer, DJ and singer from Karamelo Santo was born on January 26, 1967, in Mendoza, Argentina. His mother, Susana María Gluzman, is of Jewish-Romanian origin from Bessarabia, while his father, Luis Enrique Ogalde, is from the Basque Country, and they emigrated to Mendoza to avoid Onganía's dictatorship. Shortly after Karamelo's birth, the Ogalde family moved to the outlying suburbs of Mendoza. As he grew up he was surrounded by many artists and intellectuals, most of whom were acquaintances of his uncle Pino Ogalde.

== Career ==
=== Early days and Perfectos Idiotas ===
Heavily influenced by the Argentine rock scene, like Sumo, Fabulosos Cadillacs and Charly García, Karamelo and Marcelo Amuchástegui formed the ska band Perfectos Idiotas in the mid-1980s. The group released a demo entitled "Perfectos Idiotas" in 1987, which received national critical praise but otherwise gained little attention.

In 1993, Goy and his friends, Mario Yarque and Fabiana Droghei, founded the multicultural band Karamelo Santo. The group started on a local label, and released a reworked version of the Perfectos Idiotas single "El Baile Oficial", which quickly became a hit in Argentina. Karamelo Santo soon moved to DBN, and their first album La Kulebra was released the following year. Karmelo Santo’s sound was characterized by energetic, lively rhythms and mixed musical genres throughout their albums.

Although the group never gained much fame in the Argentine market, worldwide popularity soon followed, with the band reaching the Top 20 in Austria and Germany. The band achieved some European fame while playing in the 2002 Cumbiapunkreggae Party Tour. Karamelo later moved the band to Buenos Aires, before leaving the band in 2011 due to health problems.

=== Solo days with Kangrejoz ===
Karamelo and other bandmates from Karamelo Santo formed a new group, Kangrejoz All Stars. The songs were collectively released as Remedio De Mi Corazón in 2011. Karamelo collaborated with notable artists from Latin rock like Maldita Vecindad, Manu Chao, Fermin Muguruza, La Banda que Manda, Ska-P, Doctor Krápula, Desorden Publico, Drakos, Iries Revoultes, Les Babaciools, The Locos, Todos Tus Muertos, Los Fabulosos Cadillcs, Damas Gratis & Pablo Lezcano.

=== Other works ===
In 2003 he approached several new bands and produced their albums. His song "Que No Digan Nunca", was written for the 2000 Argentine film Caño Dorado.

== Discography ==
=== With Karamelo Santo ===
- La Kulebra (Bunker Records, 1995)
- Perfectos Idiotas (DBN, 1997)
- Los Guachos (DBN, 2001)
- Directo en Roskilde (DBN, 2001)
- Haciendo Bulla (BPR 2004)
- La Chamarrita (BPR 2004)
- La Gente Arriba (BPR, 2006)
- Antena Pachamama (BPR, 2008)
- El Baile Oficial (BPR, 2009)

=== Solo ===
- Remedio De Mi Corazón (El Cangrejo, 2010)
- La Peña Pop (El Cangrejo, 2010)
- Soy Cuyano (El Cangrejo, 2014)

=== DVD ===
- El Baile Oficial (live!) (2009)
