= Caribana Festival =

Caribana Festival may refer to the following festivals:

- Caribana Festival (Barbuda) held in Barbuda
- Caribana Festival (Canada) in the city of Toronto
- Caribana Festival (Switzerland) in the village of Crans-près-Céligny
