= Unique Copy Album =

Studio album by The bianca Story
- Released: 2009
- Recorded: October 2008
- Studio: Alterna Recording Studios
- Genre: Indiepop
- Length: 32:12
- Producers: Thomas Rechberger, Philippe Laffer

Unique Copy Album is the name of a unique copy release of an album by the Swiss band The Bianca Story in 2009 and sold through an art auction for 10000 Swiss francs. The 500 kg heavy sculpture was equipped with high-fidelity speakers and a sensor system, which controlled the volume, depending on the position of the sculpture's wing doors. If those were opened all the way, the album should be able to listened to in concert level. To skip to the next song, the sensors needed to be contacted.

== Realization ==
From October till December 2009 The bianca Story released each month a song with a videoclip for free, which ended with the unique auction of the sculpture Unique Copy Album in only one physical edition. the members of the group insisted, that the 10'000 mirror ball pieces were handcrafted and pasted up by hand. With help of some volunteers in over 3 months, this unique piece was created. The presentation was held in conjunction with an art exhibition at the Kunstmuseum Glarus, Switzerland. The Unique Copy Album was sold for 10'000 Swiss francs on behalf of the gallery Gröflin&Maag to the art collector Thomas Merian.

== Idea ==
"Most people thought we were crazy" was the comment of the group. With this by then unseen procedure they tried to bring to attention of how value was set to their music and for that intentionally took use of the mechanisms of the art business. More than a common record release, the unique put this album in the tradition of sculptural art pieces, as well inspired by Jean Michel Jarres Music For Supermarkets. First reactions were critically acclaimed, since the by then unknown band was taken as a lightweight PR stunt. Th group never denied the positive effect on that, but expressed their aim of breaking up regular structures as their main goal. With the presentation of the Unique Copy Album they send out a comment saying: "There is an original of Mona Lisa, and millions of postcards of her! This idea we liked and tried to introduce this to the music market! It's actually quite simple! Feel free to copy the idea!". The surprising positive reactions to their idea of Unique Copy Album lead to a contract at the Berlin-based music label Motor Music

All tracks are written by The bianca Story.

Unique Copy Album
No.	Title	Writer(s)	Length
1.	"Hearttreat" (Version of Afraid Of The World on Album Coming Home)	The bianca Story	3:15
2.	"Group Hug"	The bianca Story	3:20
3.	"Brand New Vision"	The bianca Story	4:04
4.	"Lion Richie"	The bianca Story	3:40
5.	"Cosmical Dancer"	The bianca Story	4:12
Total length:			32:15

== See also ==
The bianca Story
