= The Crags =

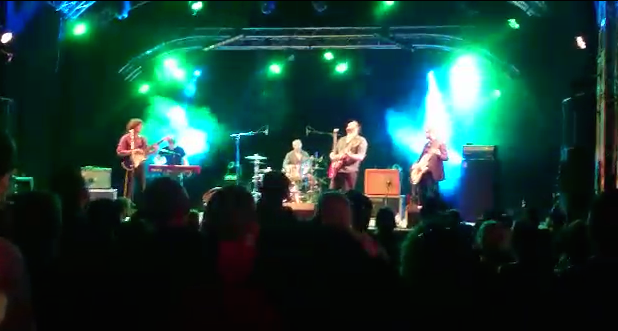
- performing at the Caribana Festival, June 2014

Background information
- Origin: Switzerland
- Genres: Rock; pop; indie
- Years active: 2009–present
- Label: Urgence Disk
- Website: thecrags.ch

The Crags are a rock band based in Geneva, Switzerland, created in 2009. Their influences are mainly English-singing rock and pop music, going from vintage to actual sounding bands. The band is also known under its previous name "Drama" (2004–2009).

== Members ==
- Sly Sullivan : Vocals, Guitar
- Phil Wyre : Hammond Organ
- Stan Galaad : Drums

== Former members ==
- John Pash : Guitar, Vocal (2009–2013)
- Oscar Martensson : Bass (2009–2018)
- Bloody Matt Anderson : Guitar, Vocals (2013–2021)

== History ==
Formed as Drama in 2004, the band published a first album in 2006 named A morning after..., from which one of its songs was spotted and regularly broadcast on local Swiss radio station Couleur 3. From that point, the band started gigging on regular bases, mainly in the French speaking part of Switzerland and nearby France.

In 2009, "Drama" became "The Crags" after a member change in the band and recorded a new twelve-song LP the same year. This new step was followed by numerous live performances, including the Montreux Jazz Festival 2010 (Music in the park), Rock en Stock 2010 Festival (Pas-de-Calais, Northern France), a gig in London, the 2011 Balélec Festival and also regular airplay on Swiss radio couleur 3, leading to a TV performance on musical program "Musicomax", on Swiss national television station RTS.

In 2012, the band published a new 4-song EP named Loola Loola ! on vinyl format. The downloadable version of this record became available in different ways through Bandcamp, iTunes, or Amazon MP3.

In June 2014, a new EP was recorded and published, The universal part of love which constituted the following up to the previous EP, under CD format this time. This one included the four songs of the Loola Loola record, completed with six new songs, recorded at Rec studios in Geneva, in April of the same year.

A musical video clip was shot on that occasion for the song "barrel of a gun"; a single which also got regular airplay on Swiss radio stations once the CD was released. The publicizing of this new record led to a series of concerts, including festivals, such as Caribana Festival (whom which the band shared the bill that evening with bands such as Queens of the Stone Age, Miles Kane, Kodaline) and the Mardisablés Festival.

During the writing process of a new album, a new song named "Please, sniff the air" was recorded in June 2015 and released at the end of August of the same year, along with its musical video clip on YouTube, for free via the usual musical platforms.

By the end of September 2017, the band released a new album, "Overgrown", which includes eleven new songs. This one is recorded in April of the same year and comes out as a 7" LP and CD. The outcome of the new record is simultaneously the start of the band's collaboration with Geneva's indie record label Urgence Disk, which also contributes to this publishing. Two singles from the new album, "Artefact" and "Frequency", were published the previous month on YouTube along with a musical clip. In order to promote the new record, the band will then play more than twenty live shows on a one-year period, mainly in Switzerland, but also including a few gigs in Eastern Europe in their tour.

After a line-up change, the band became a trio and recorded a new 8 track album In February 2024, "Happy animals" at Moon Studio in the Vevey region (Switzerland), released at the end of August 2024 on several digital listening platforms. The release of this recording was followed by the broadcast of several of its tracks on various radio stations, mainly in Switzerland, but also in France and Italy.

== Discography ==
- A Morning After... (Drama) 2006
- The Crags 2009
- Loola Loola ! 2012
- The universal part of love 2014
- Overgrown 2017
