= Soren Mounir =

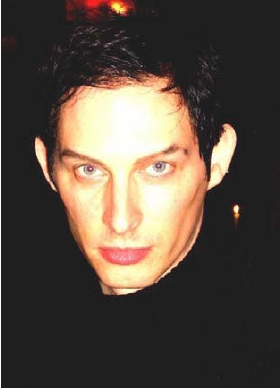

Background information
- Also known as: Dorian Gray
- Origin: Geneva, Switzerland
- Genres: Progressive rock, rock, pop, soul
- Occupation(s): Singer-songwriter, musician, producer
- Instrument(s): Vocals, drums, keyboards
- Years active: 1987–present
- Labels: MoonLand Music
- Website: http://www.moonlandmusic.com/

Soren Sorensen (born Mounir 31 July) is a Swiss-American singer-songwriter, drummer, keyboardist, record producer and radio commentator; also known as the artist Dorian Gray.

== Biography ==
=== Early life ===
Soren was born in Geneva, Switzerland. His professional career began as a drummer, first with progressive rock group KGB (CH) and then more famously in his country with band Alesia (CH) as a drummer-songwriter-producer. In KGB, Soren originally supplied drums and began to write songs.

Soren Sorensen's song "Mon Coeur l'aime" was performed by Kathy Leander to represent Switzerland at the Eurovision Song Contest, in 1996, which was hosted by a-ha singer Morten Harket in Oslo, Norway.

=== Solo career ===
2007: Soren decides to go solo and signs an important Publishing deal with Editors "SIDOMUSIC B. LIECHTI & Cie" for most of his songs and also signs a production deal for his solo project under the name of Dorian Gray with debut album "Hurt by the Moon". The album is co-produced and mixed by Chief Engineer Yvan Bing (Phil Collins) and mastered by Justin Shturtz at Sterling Sound NY.

== Producer / songwriter ==
2002: Soren Sorensen (born Mounir) discovers Welsh singer Duffy on the Internet, she's 17; together they write and produce more than 50 songs under the name of Soulego. In July 2003 they perform as a duet at the Wakestock (Wales) festival.

2003: Soren writes Star Academy 4 (French "Pop Idol") Lucie Doni's 1st single, "Je suis mes pas", which remained at 57 on the French Top 100 for six weeks (Atoll Music/Sony Music Entertainment France).

2004: Soren composed ‘Le Monde Danse’ for Swiss singer Nandita Natarajan for the Eurovision Contest which gained public recognition and won the third nomination at the Swiss selections.

2004: Soren collaborates with producer Carmen Rizzo and Jamie Muhoberac in Los Angeles on the Invisible Sun Odyssey (I.S.O.) solo project; it's a tribute to composer/producer Jeff Lynne from ELO. CDs and vinyl records of "I.S.O". are released in France for the French Nightclubs.

2004 – 2005: Soren collaborates with French talented author Jerome Attal.

2006: Soren is featured on the "BRU(i)T" compilation CD (CH) – based on an idea by Antoine Bellwald (Phil Collins) and Alban Chaperon – with an original two minutes track called "BUDDAM".

2007: Soren collaborates with French singer and superstar David Hallyday who officially supports the project Dorian Gray and becomes Dorian's stage drummer for a few concerts.

2008: Soren is the composer of the new film soundtrack "PANORAMA 08" for the "International Committee of the Red Cross" (ICRC)

== Discography ==
- 1993 : Time To Tell (Alesia) – LP
- 1996 : "Mon cœur l'aime" (Eurosong 96) – Single
- 1997 : "So Much in Love" (Fullmoon) – Vinyl Single
- 1998 : Changer (Soren) – Demo LP
- 2000 : Les mots dits (Brice Parelli) – Demo LP
- 2001 : A Piece of Life (Reldie) – Demo LP
- 2003 : Koto Buki (Duffy feat, Soulego) – 47 songs demo project
- 2004 : Invisible Sun Odyssey (I.S.O.) – Single, Vinyl single
- 2004 : "Le monde danse" (Eurosong 04) – Single
- 2006 : Hurt by the Moon (Dorian Gray) – LP
- 2006 : Buddam (BRUiT compilation) – LP
- 2006 : "Back To Tears" (Fantastic Day, compilation UK) – Single
- 2006 : "Forever More" (The Big Indie Comeback, compilation UK) – Single
- 2006 : "Back To Tears" / "Violent Thoughts" (The Big Bang, Compilation USA) – Singles
- 2006 : "Forever More" (Suisse Rock, Couleur 3 Swiss Radio compilation) – Single
- 2008 : Hurt by the Moon (Dorian Gray) – International LP
- 2008 : PANORAMA 08 (International ICRC Movie score) – Video
