= La Rvfleuze =

- Born: Seny Bengaly; 30 July 2001 (age 25); Paris, France
- Genres: French hip-hop; drill
- Occupation: Rapper
- Years active: 2022–present
- Labels: Serrure; La Triade; Atlantic

Seny Bangaly (born 30 July 2001), known professionally as La Rvfleuze, is a French rapper. He rose to popularity in 2022 with his "Serrure" freestyle series. His debut album Numéro d'écrou (2026) became his first number-one project in France.

== Early life ==
Seny Bengaly was born in Paris, France, to Senegalese parents. He grew up in the 19th arrondissement of Paris, in particular the neighborhood of Porte d'Aubervilliers.

Initially a promising soccer player, Bengaly played for the youth academy of AJ Auxerre. However, he quit following a childhood of delinquency.

== Career ==
=== 2022–2024: Career beginnings and arrest, EALS ===
Seny Bengaly subsequently turned to rapping and released his first track, "Serrure #1" on 18 May 2022. This was followed a month later by "Serrure #2". On 30 September 2022 "Surrure 3" was released. In the same year, Bengaly was arrested and eventually convicted on burglary charges.

Despite being incarcerated, La Rvfleuze's music continued to gain traction, with unreleased tracks being uploaded to TikTok, as well as other videos related to him. As a result, his debut EP EALS was released from prison on 12 July 2024.

=== 2025–present: Release from prison, Numéro d'écrou ===
La Rvfleuze was released from prison in March 2025 and released "Serrure #4" on 9 April. This was followed up by the singles "P.I.B" and "Tie Break" in the following months. Also in July, La Rvfleuze featured on Gazo's single "KAT". He then released "Serrure #5" on 13 August, which became the most popular version. The song "Lewis Hamilton" came out on 15 September. In the same month the single "Connexion Macabre" released, featuring Leto. On 12 November he released the track "Money in the Bank".

On 6 February, La Rvfleuze and Freeze Corleone collaborated on the song "Serrure #667". During this time, he was sent back to prison briefly. Ten days later, he appeared on the COLORS show to perform his next single "Argent Sale", which increased his profile further. The following month, La Rvfleuze's debut album Numéro d'écrou released with features from Gazo, Hamza, Koba LaD, and Freeze Corleone. It debuted at number one on the French Albums Chart, held the position for five weeks and was certified Gold within a month. In May 2026 he collaborated with Aya Nakamura on the track "Sexy Nana", and in June he featured on the song "Devin Booker" with JRK 19.

== Discography ==
=== Studio albums ===
- Numéro d'écrou (2026)
