= The Bianca Story =

Swiss indiepop band

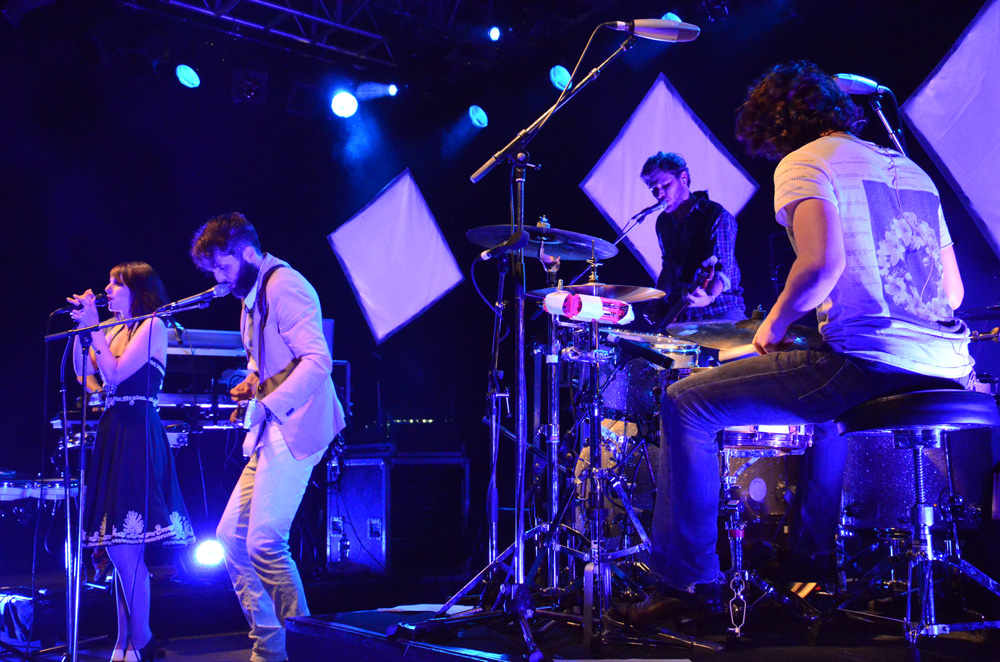

Background information
- Origin: Basel, Switzerland
- Genres: Indie pop, art pop, art rock
- Years active: 2006–present
- Labels: Motor Music
- Members: Elia Rediger; Anna Gosteli; Fabian Chiquet; Joël Fonsegrive; Lorenz Rutigliano
- Website: www.thebiancastory.com

The Bianca Story is a Swiss indiepop quintet, formed in 2006 in Basel. The band consists of Elia Rediger (Vocal & Guitar), Anna Gosteli (Voice, Accordion, Autoharp), Fabian Chiquet (Piano, Percussion, backing vocals), Joel Fonsegrive (Bass Guitar) and Lorenz Rutigliano (Drums). In 2011 they were signed by German label Motor Music.

== Unique Copy Album ==
The band is also known for their performances and multimedia art like the release of the Unique Copy Album in 2009, where they auctioned the only copy of their album as a multimedia-sculpture. The piece was exhibited and sold to a private art collector for 10,000 Swiss francs.

== Coming Home ==
The second album, Coming Home, was recorded at Abbey Road Studios in London and was released in January 2012.

== M & The Acid Monks ==
In March 2012 the Deutsche Oper Berlin invited them to visit with their music theater M & The Acid Monks that they had written with director Daniel Pfluger.

== Digger ==
In 2013 their crowd funding project Are You Digger? (germ: Bist du Kumpel?) collected 91,662 Euros, allowing the album to be free. Using the Matterhorn as a symbol for the music industry, they dug a tunnel through its old rocks. On November 11, 2013, the project closed.

== Gilgamesh Must Die ==
In March 2014, their new piece was presented during the Digger-Tour at the Deutsche Oper Berlin. Again it was a cooperation with The Bianca Story and director Daniel Pfluger.

== Discography ==
=== Albums ===
- Hi Society! (2008)
- Unique Copy Album (2009)
- Coming Home (2012)
- DIGGER (2013)

=== Singles ===
- "Coming Home" (2010)
