= Zamdane =

Moroccan rapper (born 1997)

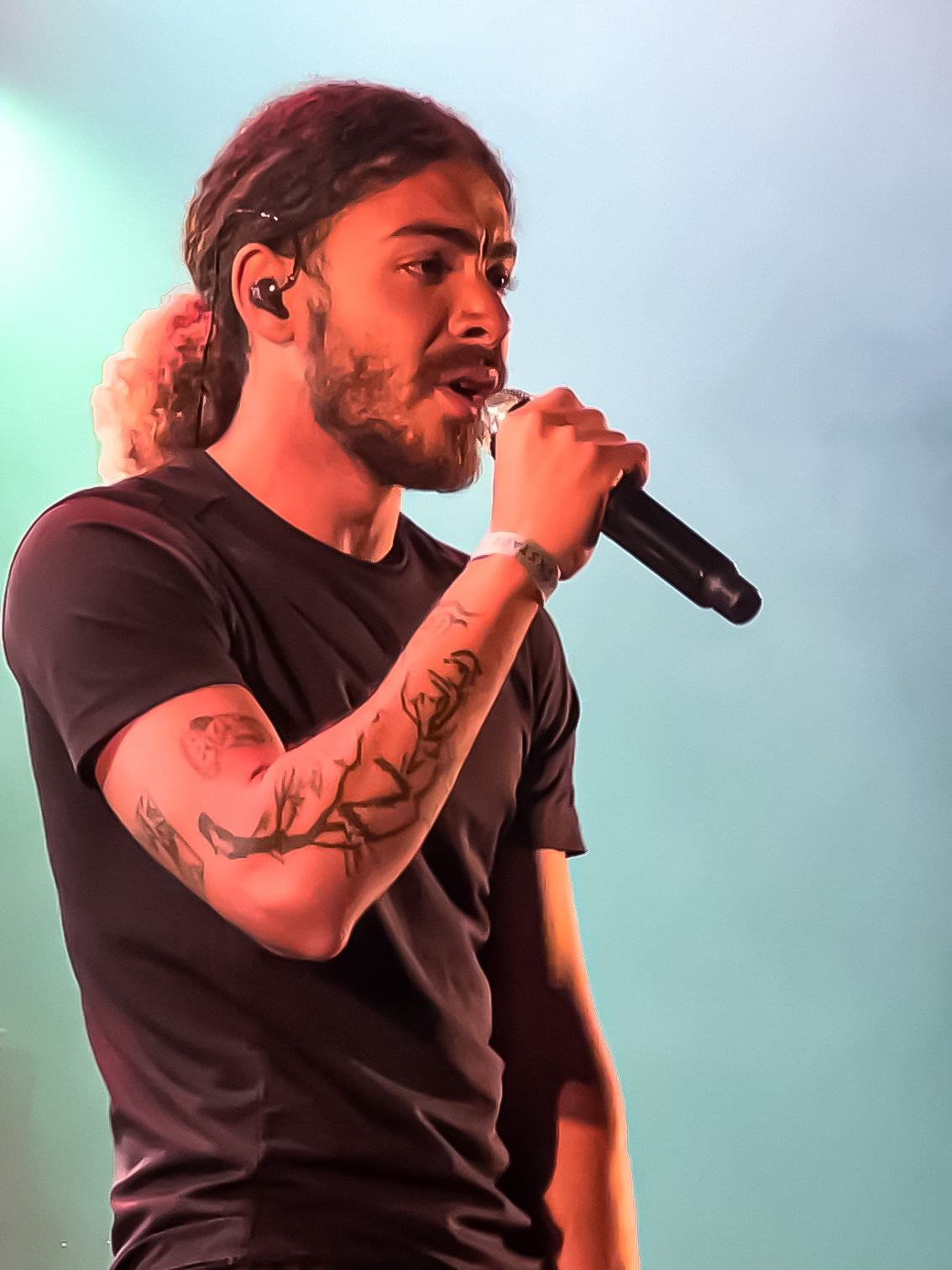
- Zamdane at the Caribana Festival, in Switzerland, 2024

Background information
- Also known as: Zam
- Born: Ayoub Zaidane; September 25, 1997 (age 29)
- Origin: Marrakesh, Morocco
- Genres: Trap; French hip-hop; Cloud rap
- Occupations: Rapper, singer
- Years active: 2017–present
- Website: zamdane.com

Ayoub Zaidane (Arabic: أيوب زيدان; born September 25, 1997), better known by his stage name Zamdane, is a Moroccan rapper and singer who performs primarily in French.

== Early life ==
Zamdane was born and raised in the Bab Doukkala neighborhood of Marrakesh, a place he frequently references in his music. As a child, he practiced French with his father, a polyglot tour guide. During this time, he developed an appreciation for classic French singers like Charles Aznavour and Dalida. At age 17, he moved to France in July 2015 to study economics in Istres, near Marseille. Influenced by friends, he discovered rap through artists like Nekfeu and quickly began his own musical career. In October 2015, he started performing at open mic events, where he connected with numerous figures in the local music scene.

== Career ==
=== Career beginnings (2017–2020) ===
Zamdane released his first track, "Sinbad," in early 2017, but gained initial recognition with "Favaro," which amassed millions of views. This led to an invitation to participate in the sixth session of Règlement Freestyle series. In March 2018, he was featured on Grünt #34, a dedicated freestyle session that expanded his audience, as did his appearance on the remix of Lord Esperanza's track "Noir."

Between 2018 and 2019, he released four projects (Yung D/C, 20's, Affamé - Saison 1, and Z) before unveiling the two-part EP Chrysalis in May 2020. He concluded the year with a collaboration on the track "La fête" with rapper Hatik.

=== Affamé – Saison 2 (2021) ===
On February 3, 2021, Zamdane launched the second season of his Affamé freestyle series with "Affamé #6 - Vital." From February to June, he released a new track every two weeks, totaling eight songs, all accompanied by music videos. This consistent output broadened his audience, with several tracks surpassing one million views on YouTube, including "Hayati (Affamé #8)" featuring Soso Maness. Later that year, Maness invited him to perform the exclusive track "Le monde par ma fenêtre" on Skyrock's Planète Rap.

=== Couleur de ma peine (2021–2022) ===
Prior to his debut album's release, Zamdane signed with Warner Chappell Music France, a milestone his manager described as "an enormous privilege." Following a productive start to the year with over ten new tracks, he released "Zhar," the lead single from Couleur de ma Peine, on November 3, 2021. The video, co-directed with Roxane Peyronnenc, featured a painting by his friend Alia Alves Lahnaoui (3aliart) depicting Tuareg nomads, which also appeared on the album cover.

On December 5, he announced album collaborations with Soso Maness, Jazzy Bazz, and Dinos. The collaboration with Dinos, "Boyka," was released three days later and surpassed one million views. In the week before the album's release, Zamdane organized a charity campaign with SOS Méditerranée, raising €14,000 to fund a day of sea rescues through merchandise sales, a charity dinner, an auction, and a concert. The track "Flouka," released the day before the album, highlighted this cause.

Couleur de ma Peine was released on February 25, 2022, debuting at number five on the French Top Albums chart with 5,053 copies sold in its first week. The collaborative track "Fauves" with Jazzy Bazz reached number 145 on the Top Singles chart.

=== Affamé – Saison 3 (2023) ===
In February 2023, Zamdane announced the third season of his Affamé series with "Poussière (Affamé #14)," released on February 7. He revealed the series would include ten tracks and announced a concert at La Cigale for April 28, 2023. The subsequent single, "Triste mais elle aime ça (Affamé #16)," became his most successful debut, reaching number 12 on YouTube and Twitter trends. He later collaborated with Booska-P on "Formidable (Affamé #21)." In March, he was involved in a serious car accident, receiving support from across the French rap community.

=== Solsad (2024) ===
Zamdane organized an album release event at Paris's Atelier des Lumières on February 28, 2024. Solsad sold 6,776 copies in its first week (3,920 physical sales, 7 downloads, and 2,829 streaming equivalents), debuting at number three on the Top Album chart behind projects by PLK and Werenoi, but ahead of Dadju and Tayc's Héritage.

=== Rahma (2025) ===
In May 2025, Zamdane released his third studio album titled Rahma, meaning mercy in Arabic.

== Discography ==
=== Studio albums ===
- 2022: Couleur de ma peine (Black Palladium Music / Bendo Music)
- 2024: Solsad (Affamés Records / Bendo Music)
- 2025: Rahma (Affamés Records / Bendo Music)

== See also ==
- Moroccans in France
- Lartiste - Moroccan-born French rapper
- La Fouine - Prominent Moroccan-French rapper
