= Klischée =

Klischée (tr. "Cliché") is an electro-swing band from Bern.

== History ==
Klischée was formed in 2010 as a studio project by music producers Dominique Dreier and Kilian Spinnler. In 2011, they began their first live performances with visual jockey (VJ) Benjamin Kniel, who has been part of the group ever since. Later, MC and singer William Bejedi – also known as "45 degré" – joined the band. As "Klischée & Band," they are accompanied by up to three live musicians and a female vocalist. The singles "Tin Tin" and "Tiquette" have been aired on radio in Switzerland. They have toured widely in Switzerland, and, to some extent, elsewhere.

== Style ==
Klischée's music blends electronic elements (drum beats, synthesizers) with acoustic swing and jazz elements (e.g., trumpets, guitar).

== Discography ==
=== Albums ===
- 2016: Bend the Rules
- 2014: Touché

=== EPs ===
- 2021: Late Check-Out EP

=== Singles ===
- 2023: Tom's Diner
- 2021: So Good
- 2021: Get This (Bang Bang)
- 2021: Bad Things
- 2019: Stick to What You Got ft. Marina & The Kats
- 2018: Bella Ciao
- 2017: Mais Non (1920 Version)
- 2016: Bend the Rules
- 2016: Damn Hot
- 2014: Tiquette
- 2013: Sometimes
- 2013: Tin Tin

=== Remixes ===
- 2022: Moira – Limonade
- 2022: Marina & The Kats – Pressure
- 2019: Brass Department – Welcome to the Brass Department
- 2018: Tim Freitag – By Your Side (Stereotyp GmbH / Noodle Soup Records)
- 2015: Traktorkestar – Gavotte de carotte (Trakton)
- 2013: Feet in the Sun (Lunik / Sophie Records)
- 2012: Quarantine (Bonaparte / Warner Music Germany)
