= Naomi Lareine =

Swiss musician (born 1994)

- Born: Naomi Bruderer; 17 January 1994 (age 32); Switzerland
- Occupations: Singer; songwriter
- Years active: 2018–present
Association football career
- Position: Defender
Youth career
- 2005–2006: FC Wallisellen
- 2006–2008: FC Langnau
- 2008–2009: GC/Schwerzenbach
- 2009–2010: Grasshopper
Senior career*
Years	Team	Apps	(Gls)
2010–2015	Grasshopper	9	(0)
2017	FC Altstetten	32	(8)
International career
2010–2011	Switzerland U17	10	(0)
2011	Switzerland U19	4	(0)
- * Club domestic league appearances and goals

Naomi Bruderer (born 17 January 1994), known professionally as Naomi Lareine, is a Swiss rhythm and blues singer-songwriter and former footballer who represented Switzerland internationally as a youth.

== Career ==
Discovered by the rapper Noizy, Lareine released her first song, "Sweet Latina", in March 2018. Nine months later, her song "Issa Vibe" was a noted success and allowed her to establish herself in Swiss music. She has collaborated with the rapper Stress and has performed, with him and solo, in major Swiss music festivals, including the Gurtenfestival. In 2019, Swiss Radio chose her as "SRF 3 Best Talent" for her debut EP, "Unchained".

Initially, Lareine's love songs were about boys. But after her first romantic relationship, with a woman, she decided to come out as gay and to write only about women, beginning with "Sweet Latina". She has attributed the success of her songs, in part, to their resulting authenticity.

== Personal life ==
Lareine's family is of Senegalese, Mauritanian and Swiss origin. Her father was a professional ice hockey player. Up until age 19, she played football for Grasshopper Club Zürich and in the Swiss national under-19 football team, then decided to focus on her musical career.

"Naomi Lareine" is a stage name. She was in her mid-twenties as of 2019.
