= Dirty Sound Magnet =

Swiss rock band

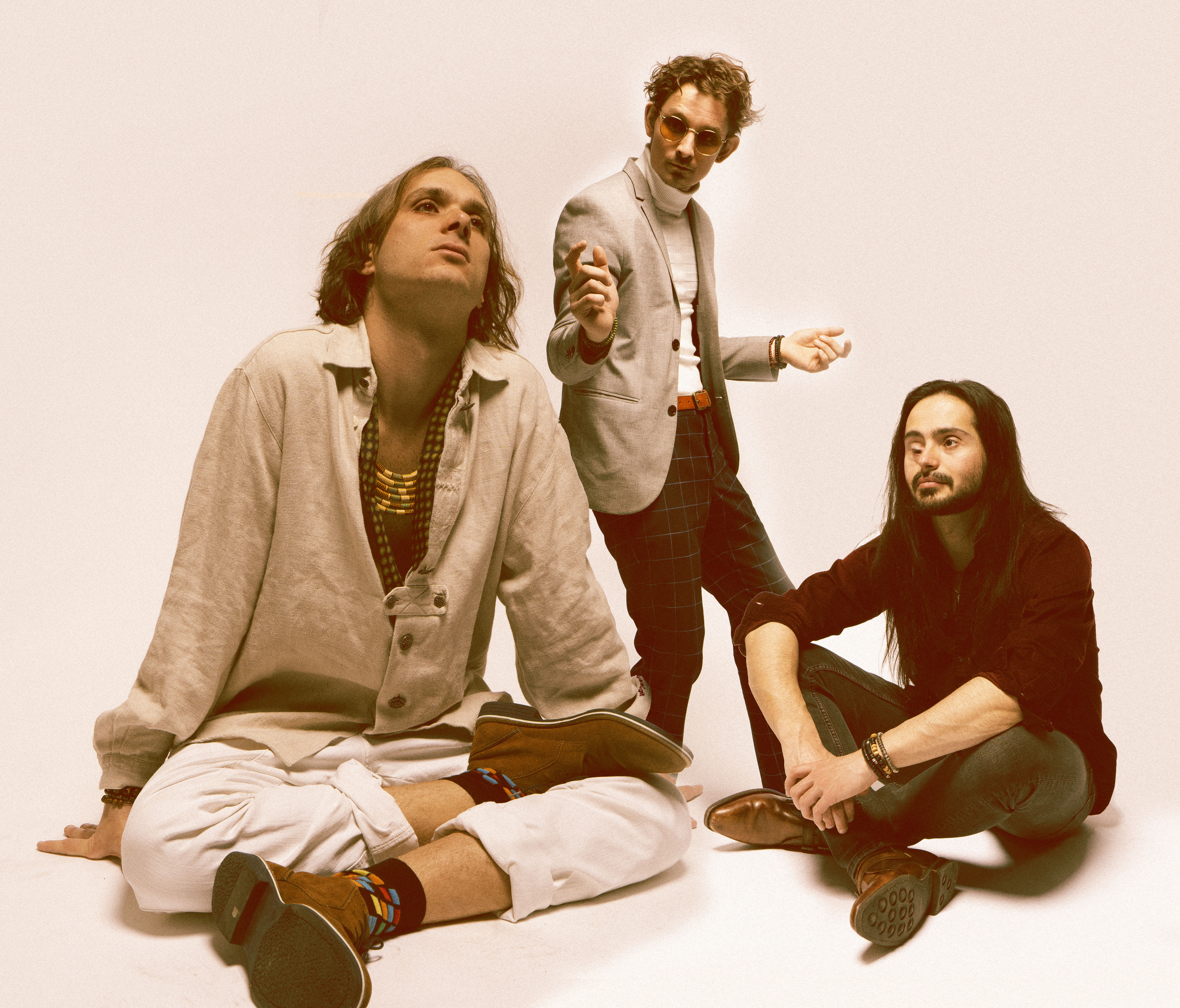
- Stavros Dzodzos, Maxime Cosandey, Marco Mottolini

Background information
- Origin: Switzerland
- Genres: psychedelic rock, progressive rock, blues rock
- Instruments: guitar, bass guitar, drums, vocals, special effects
- Years active: 2008–present
- Labels: Noisolution, Hummus Records
- Members: Stavros Dzodzos; Marco Mottolini; Maxime Cosandey
- Website: dirtysoundmagnet.com

Dirty Sound Magnet are a rock band from Switzerland. The group is known for its mix of psychedelic rock, progressive rock, and blues rock.

== History ==
Stavros Dzodzos, Marco Mottolini and Maxime Cosandey are all from the town of Fribourg in Switzerland. They met as teenagers in 2008 and shared a passion for the music of the psychedelic rock era of the 1960s and 1970s. When they began to get serious about recording their music, they were joined by Didier Coenegracht (vocals, keyboard) and released two albums 'What Lies Behind' in 2012 and 'The Bloop' in 2014. In 2015 Dirty Sound Magnet and Didier Coenegracht went their separate ways and the band in its current evolution began to take shape.

The band designed and built a recording studio in their rehearsal room (one of the many fallout shelters in Switzerland) and in 2017 released their album 'Western Lies'. The single 'Homo Economicus' from the album won the M4Music Demotape Clinic award for best rock single and this, among other songs from the album achieved airplay on many Swiss radio shows, including SRF3 and garnered press interest from German and Swiss music music magazines

November 2018 saw the release of the single 'Social Media Boy', which was again well received in European rock magazines, such as Switzerland's Artnoir, Belgium's Frontview This heralded the release of the 2019 album 'Transgenic'. In the middle of the promotional tour for the album, the COVID-19 pandemic led to mass cancellations, so the band retreated to their rehearsal room and continued playing and recording music. Out of this situation the album 'Live Alert' was created. In an interview on Francophone Swiss Television, RTS, Stavros explained how the whole album was recorded and videoed live. The recorded sessions were shown on the German Swiss channel SRF.

The Fribourg trio Dirty Sound Magnet 'inspires with their live power on stages all over Europe', and following on from the success of 'Live Alert', in 2022 their new album 'DSM-III' was recorded in the same way, with 'propulsive music, riffs and fingerpicking techniques'. The band further cemented their reputation for their live performances in November 2022 when they won the category of Best Rock Act at the Swiss Live Talents award. In February 2023 Dirty Sound Magnet completed a well received tour of Mexico.

== Members ==
- Stavros Dzodzos (lead guitar, vocals)
- Marco Mottolini (bass guitar, backing vocals)
- Maxime Cosandey (drums, backing vocals, special effects)

== Discography ==
=== Album (with Kamar and Sebastien) ===
- Activate the Magnet (2009)

=== Albums (with Didier Coenegracht) ===
- What Lies Behind (2012)
- The Bloop (2014)

=== Albums ===
- Western Lies (2017)
- Transgenic (2019)
- Live Alert (2020)
- DSM-III (2022)
- Dreaming in Dystopia (2023)
- Me and My Shadow (2026)

=== Singles ===
- Homo Economicus (2017)
- Social Media Boy (2018)
- Skull Drawing Rose (2020)
- The Poet and His Prophet (2020)
- Black Dog (2020)
- Have a Cigar (2020)
- Pandora's Dream (2021)
- Heavy Hours (2021)
- Toxic Monkeys (2021)
- Sunday Drama (2022)
- Meet the Shaman (2022)
- Dead Inside (2025)
- Calypso (2025)
