= Yoa =

French-Swiss singer-songwriter and actress

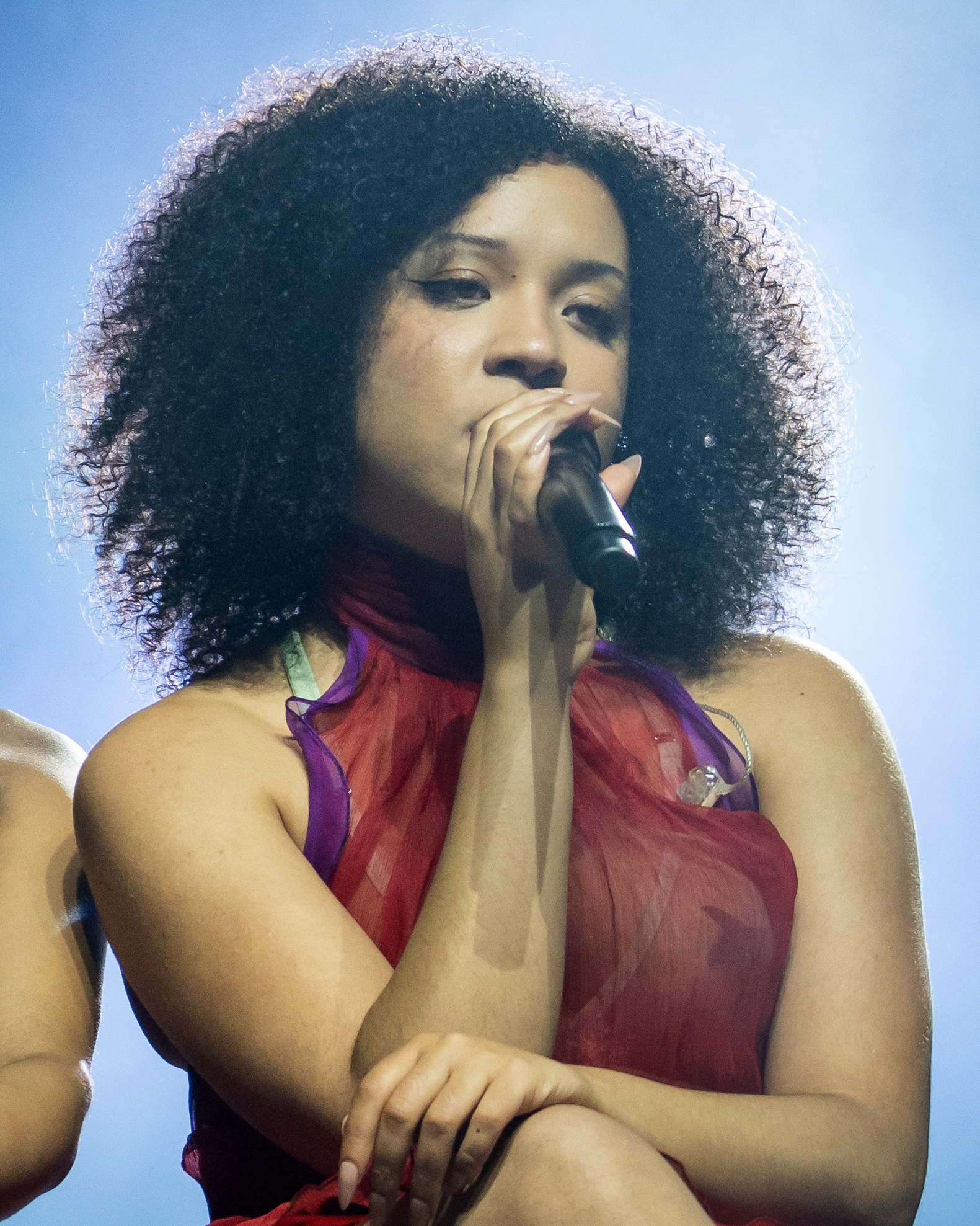
- Yoa at the Papillons de Nuit Festival 2025

Background information
- Born: Yoanna Bolzli; 24 December 1998 (age 27); Paris, France
- Genres: Chanson; pop; electropop
- Occupations: Singer; songwriter; actress
- Years active: 2020–present
- Label: Panenka Music
- Website: www.yoa.store

Yoanna Bolzli (born 24 December 1998), professionally known as Yoa, is a French-Swiss singer-songwriter and actress.

After starting her career in theater, she ventured into music and released her first EP Attentes on 22 October 2021. She released her second EP Chansons tristes on 25 November 2022, followed by a reissue on 15 July 2023, featuring three new tracks. Her latest EP Nulle was released on 14 June 2024.

Yoa released her first studio album La Favorite on 31 January 2025. At the 40th Victoires de la Musique ceremony in 2025, she won the Breakthrough Live Performance award.

== Biography ==
Yoa was born as Yoanna Bolzli on 24 December 1998, in Paris to a Swiss Jurassian father and a Cameroonian mother.

She began playing piano at age 7. After studying English, arts, and literature, she started her artistic career in theater. She co-wrote and produced a play titled Régime soupe aux choux: mode d'emploi with Léa Goldstein, which they performed from March 2020 to August 2022.

She signed with Panenka Music label and released her second EP Chansons tristes in late 2022. In 2022, she was selected for Les Inouïs du Printemps de Bourges and Le Chantier des Francofolies. She appeared on Georgio's album Années sauvages, released under the same label. After releasing the single "Matcha Queen" in early 2024, she released the EP Nulle on 14 June 2024. Her first album La Favorite, containing 15 tracks, was released on 31 January 2025. That same year, she won the Breakthrough Live Performance award at the Victoires de la Musique and was nominated in the Female Breakthrough category. Following a French tour and a performance at the Olympia on 15 April 2025, Yoa is scheduled to perform at Salle Pleyel in Paris on 29 and 30 January 2026.

== Theater ==
- 2020-2022: "Régime soupe aux choux: mode d'emploi" at Les Déchargeurs theater, directed by Léa Goldstein and Yoa

== Activism ==
On 15 July 2025, the artist canceled her performance at the Francofolies de Spa festival due to singer Amir's presence on the lineup. She explained her decision by stating that her social, political, and humanist convictions prevented her from sharing a stage with an artist who does not acknowledge the ongoing situation in Palestine and who has participated in events supporting the Israeli military. She thanked those who informed her about the situation. In response, Amir's record label Parlophone (Warner) issued a statement condemning what they described as antisemitic hate speech.

== Discography ==
Studio albums

- La Favorite (2025)
