= Redwood (band) =

1990s English alternative rock band

Redwood were an English alternative rock band formed in Birmingham, and based in Guildford, Surrey, England, who were active for the majority of the 1990s before finally splitting up in 2000 after their record label Almo Sounds became defunct. The band consisted of Alistair Cowan (vocals/bass), Rob Blackham (guitar/vocals), Angus Cowan (guitar) and Chris Hughes (drums/vocals).

In 1994 Redwood released their first demo, Head, followed in 1995 by a second demo, Asylum. In November 1997 Redwood released their debut album, Colourblind, described by Allmusic as "an impressive debut". They made several radio appearances, including sessions for Jeff Cooper's 'XS' show, which later became Radio2XS.

In September 2000 Redwood released their second album, Redwood, shortly before splitting up.

Rob Blackham went on to be a producer for, most notably, The Cooper Temple Clause. Alistair and Angus Cowan have since played two acoustic gigs as Redwood, at the Guildford Festival in 2003 and at Surrey University, in May 2004. In 2005, Alistair Cowan released his debut solo album, entitled Why Can I See Stars.
