= Favez =

Favez is a rock band from Lausanne, Switzerland. On their first three albums (prior to 1997) they were called Favez Disciples, after a figure from the movie Le Mans with Steve McQueen

== Current lineup ==
As of 2007, their lineup is:

- Chris Wicky — vocals, guitar
- Guy Borel — guitar
- Yvan Lechef — bass guitar
- Fabrice Marguerat — drums
- Maude Oswald - Hammond
- Jeff Albelda - Rhodes, piano

== Discography ==
- Always Satisfied (1992)
- And the World Don't Care (1993)
- Arrogance (1995)
- The Eloquence of the Favez Disciples (1997)
- A Sad Ride on the Line Again (1999)
- Gentlemen Start Your Engines (2000)
- From Lausanne, Switzerland (2002)
- Bellefontaine Avenue (2003)
- Old and Strong in the Modern Times (2005)
- Bigger Mountains Higher Flags (2007)
- En Garde! (2011)
