= Karamelo Santo =

Argentinian band

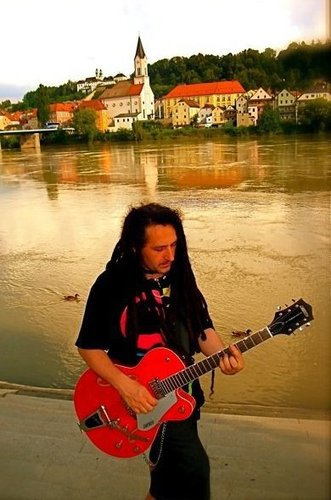

Background information
- Origin: Mendoza, Argentina
- Genres: Ska, punk, cumbia, reggae, hip hop
- Years active: 1992-present
- Label: Kangrejoz records
- Members: Goy Karamelo, Adrián Frydman, Nacho Ismael, Manza, Mati Puravida, Sebwahwah
- Website: Official site, Karamelo Santo's MySpace

Karamelo Santo is a Latin rock band from Mendoza, Argentina. Formed in 1992 for Goy Karamelo, they released their first album, La Kulebra (The snake) in 1995. Since then, they have released nine more albums. The single "Que No Digan Nunca" is probably their best-known song. It was used on the soundtrack for the movie Caño Dorado.

The band was the first to introduce cumbia style rock. The band's song "Los Botones" was originally written for the first album in 1988. The band plays a mix of rock, ska, jazz, salsa, folk, rap, reggae, funk and cumbia. The lineup has changed over the years, but the main members have always been the co-founders: singer Guillermo Ogalde Gluzman (known as Goy Karamelo) and Mario Yarke. The band has collaborated with several famous musicians, such as Manu Chao, Fermin Muguruza, Sergent Garcia, Ska-P and David Byrne.

With Todos Tus Muertos, Kortatu and Mano Negra, they are among the most influential bands of the Latin punk rock world.

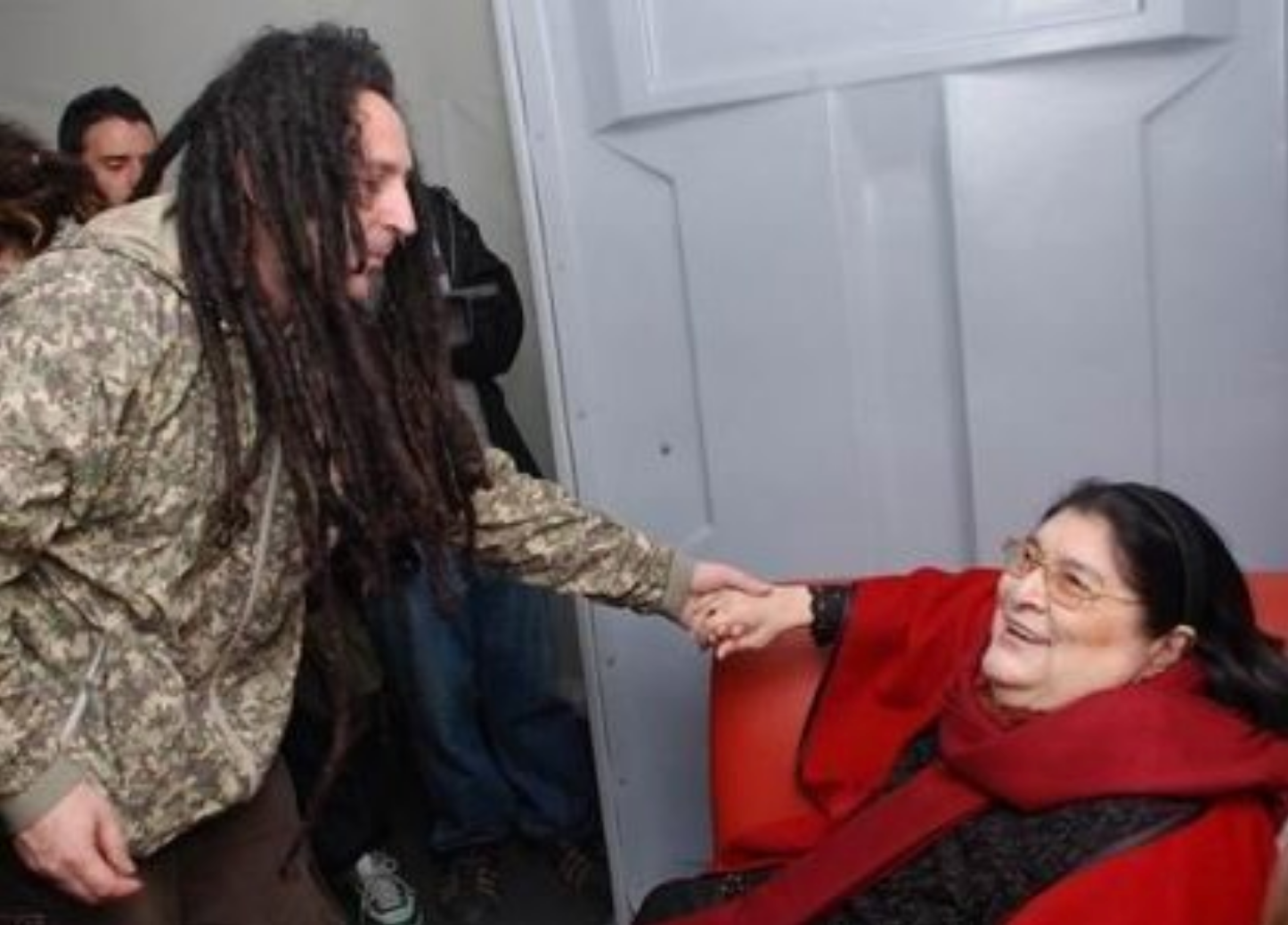
Goy de Karamelo Santo and Mercedes Sosa during the appointment of both as Cultural Ambassadors of Mendoza in 2008

== History ==
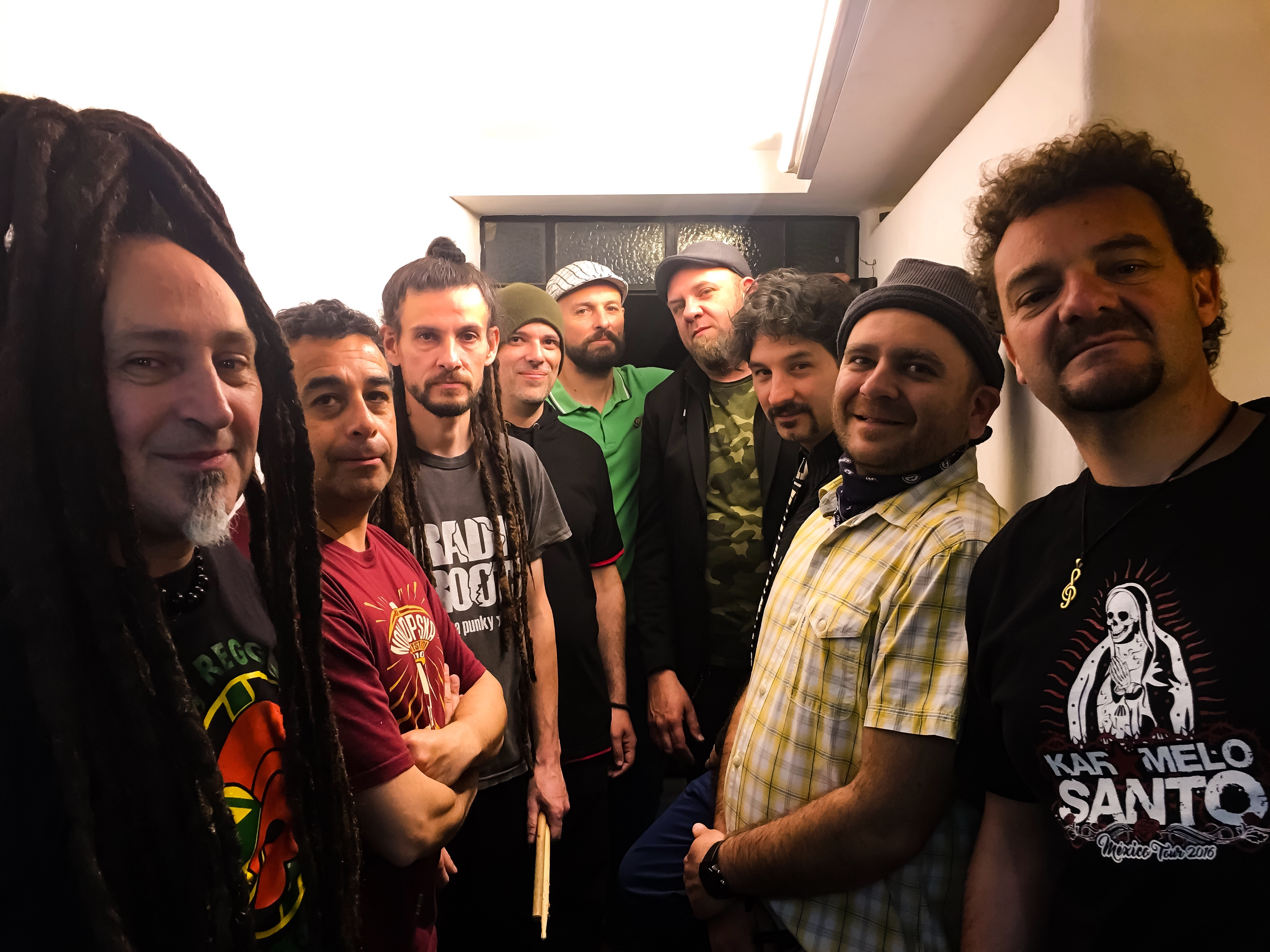
Karamelo santo 2018

Karamelo Santo was formed in Mendoza in 1992, founded by Goy Karamelo the same year recorded their first album, La Kulebra. After three years of recording, a second album was released called Perfectos Idiotas. After the second album Goy was invited to collaborate with Manu Chao and, with Chao and the rest of Radio Bemba, they went to Argentina.

In 1997, Goy Karamelo founded Kangrejoz Records, an independent music label, which included bands like Non Palidece, Resistencia Suburbana and Andando Descalzo.

In 2001, Karamelo Santo recorded Los Guachos which produced and featured Manu Chao, Tonino Carotone of Los Guajolotes and band members of Resistencia Suburbana and Los Auténticos Decadentes. This album has a mixture of reggae, hip hop, punk and Latin rhythms. With this album they did an international tour which included Mexico, Europe, United States, Chile, Uruguay and Colombia.

In 2002, they toured in Europe with Los Guachos. This milestone marked the beginning of the band's relationship with Europe, that every year challenges the most established cultural barriers and has permitted them to become one of the best-known representatives of Latin American music in Europe.

2008: Culture Ambassador In March 2008, Goy was appointed cultural ambassador of the province of Mendoza together with the singer Mercedes Sosa

== Members ==
- Goy: Guitar, Vocals
- Nacho: Percusión, Vocals
- Bebote: Trumpet, Vocals
- Sebwahwah: Bass, Vocals
- Matías: Barítone Sax, Vocals
- Manza: Drums, Vocals

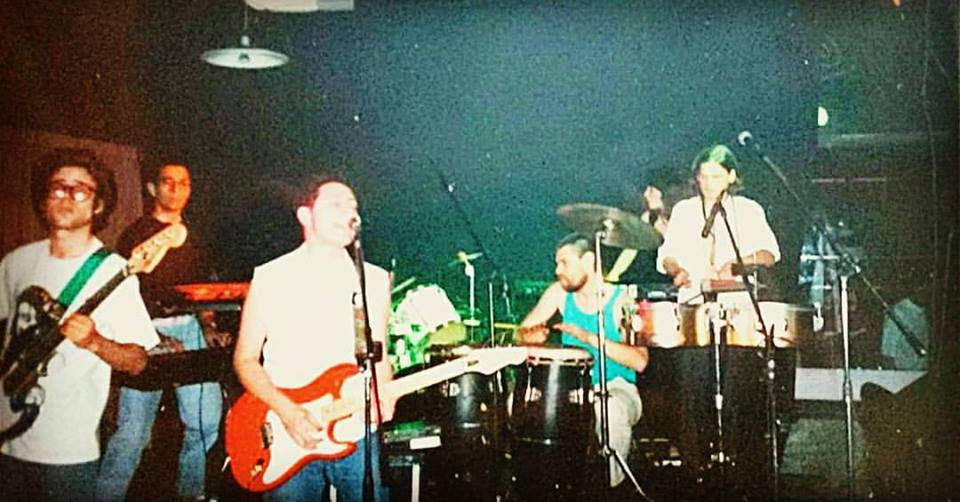
Karamelo Santo 1992

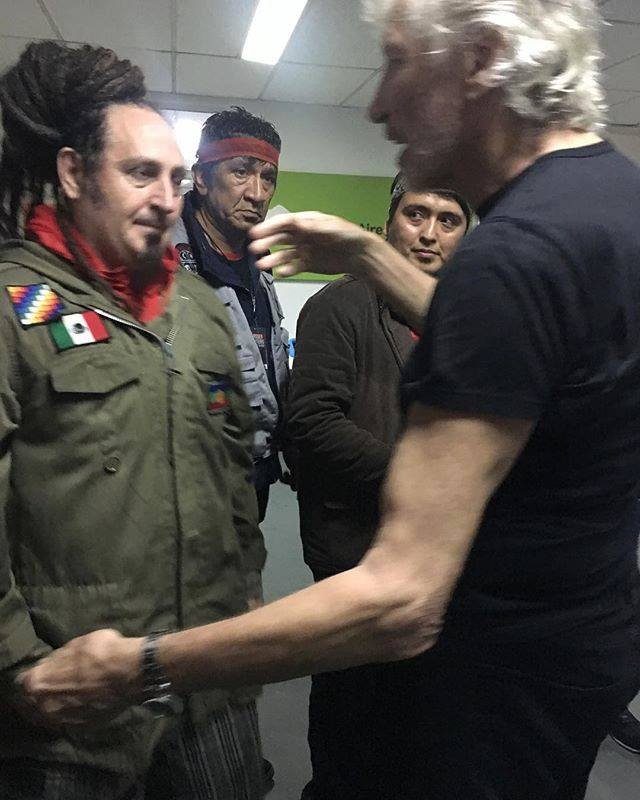
Roger Waters congratulates Goy de Karamelo Santo for his work, production and visibility of the sound and music of the original peoples of America, November 2018

== Discography ==
Year	Title	Label
1995	La Kulebra	Bunker Records
1997	Perfectos Idiotas	DBN
2001	Los Guachos	BPR
2003	Roskilde Live!	Kangrejoz Records
2004	Haciendo Bulla	BPR
2005	La Chamarrita	Kangrejoz Records
2006	La Gente Arriba	BPR
2007	Antena Pachamama	BPR
2009	El Baile Oficial	BPR
2012	Remedio De Mi Corazón	Kangrejoz Records
2013	Soy Cuyano	Kangrejoz Records
2017	Severa Bullaranga	Kangrejoz Records
2017	Megacústico	BPR
2019	El Gran Poder Vol.1	Plaza Independencia Música
2021	El Gran Poder Vol.2	Kangrejoz Records
2021	No Nos Cuenten Cromañon	Kangrejoz Records
2022	Venceremos	Kangrejoz Records
2023	30 Milenios	Kangrejoz Records

== See also ==
- Argentine punk
- Argentine Rock
