= Djadja & Dinaz =

French hip hop duo

- Origin: Meaux, France
- Genre: French hip hop
- Years active: Since 2014
- Labels: Carré-Music, Musicast
- Members: Djadja (Gianni Bellou); Dinaz (Azzedine Hedhli)

Djadja & Dinaz is a French hip hop duo from Meaux and made up of Gianni Bellou (Djadja) and Azzedine Hedhli (Dinaz).

== Biography ==
The group received attention in December 2014 with the controversial video for their song "Laisse-nous faire notre biff" which shows a dozen young people shooting firearms in a parking lot. The two rappers (Djadja and Dinaz) and three of the extras were subsequently identified by the police, and four of them were sentenced to three months in prison.

The group had further success in 2016 with the video for their song J'fais mes affaires accumulating 40 million views in February 2017.

The group released their first studio album named On s'promet on May 6, 2016. The album sold 7,000 copies in its first week. The album is certified platinum in February 2017 for selling over 100,000 copies in France.

== Discography ==
=== Albums ===
Year	Album	Peak positions				Units
Year	Album	FRA	BEL (Fl)	BEL (WA)	SWI	Units
2016	On s'promet	5	—	24	—	
2017	Dans l'arène	4	10	36		
2018	Le revers de la médaille	2	159	3	24	
2018	Le revers de la médaille – Partie 2	176	—	4	89	
2019	Drôle de mentalité	3	100	5	19	FRA: 101,499
2021	Spleen	1	39	2	6	FRA: Triple Platinum
2023	Alpha	1	118	3	4	
2025	Terminal 7	1	—	5	9	
2026	Matiére Noire	2	—	—	—	

=== Singles ===
Year	Single	Peak positions			Album
Year	Single	FRA	BEL (WA)	SWI	Album
2016	"J'fais mes affaires"	72	18 (Ultratip*)	—	
2017	"Souviens-toi"	52	28 (Ultratip*)	—	Dans l'arène
2017	"Maléfique" (with DJ Babs)	29	—	—	Non-album singles
2017	"Tenue de motard 4"	67	22 (Ultratip*)	—	Non-album singles
2018	"J'souris"	19	19 (Ultratip*)	—	Le revers de la médaille
2018	"Favela"	152	—	—	
2019	"Possédé"	3	50	—	Drôle de mentalité
2019	"Plus fort"	33	35 (Ultratip*)	—	Drôle de mentalité
2019	"Bénéfice max"	28	36 (Ultratip*)	—	Drôle de mentalité
2019	"Un million par mois"	10	14 (Ultratip*)	—	Drôle de mentalité
2020	"PRBM"	22	38 (Ultratip*)	—	Non-album singles
2020	"Féfé lambo"	28	Tip	—	Non-album singles
2020	"Perdu"	4	17 (Ultratip*)	—	Spleen
2021	"Booska 77"	10	13 (Ultratip*)	—	Non-album single
2021	"À cœur ouvert"	1	2	—	Spleen
2021	"Manège"	19	—	—	Non-album singles
2021	"J'rentre pas chez moi"	81	—	—	Non-album singles
2021	"Dans le réseau"	7	50	88	Non-album singles
2022	"Bonkasa"	14	—	—	Non-album singles
2023	"La force tranquille"	7	48	—	Alpha
2023	"Capitaine"	5	49	—	Alpha
2023	"Khemem"	25	—	—	Alpha
2023	"Aicha"	33	—	—	Non-album singles
2025	"Avancer"	44	—	—	Non-album singles

*Did not appear in the official Belgian Ultratop 50 charts, but rather in the bubbling under Ultratip charts.

=== Other charting songs ===
Year	Single	Peak positions		Album
Year	Single	FRA	BEL (WA)	Album
2016	"À la cool"	188	—	
2016	"Elle"	99	—	
2017	"Déstabilisé"	16	8 (Ultratip*)	Dans l'arène
2017	"C'est la même"	24	—	Dans l'arène
2017	"Catalogués bandits"	25	—	Dans l'arène
2017	"Mauvais comportement"	29	24 (Ultratip*)	Dans l'arène
2017	"Dans la cité"	34	—	Dans l'arène
2017	"La haine"	38	—	Dans l'arène
2017	"En vrai"	41	—	Dans l'arène
2017	"J'suis Kha"	44	—	Dans l'arène
2017	"On parle pas"	45	—	Dans l'arène
2017	"Seuls"	53	—	Dans l'arène
2017	"Avant"	61	—	Dans l'arène
2017	"Les crocs"	65	—	Dans l'arène
2017	"J'veux plus les voir"	68	—	Dans l'arène
2017	"J'ai pas dormi de la nuit"	74	—	Dans l'arène
2017	"Tu veux les billets"	98	—	Dans l'arène
2017	"Je m'isole"	114	—	Dans l'arène
2017	"On avance seuls"	146	—	Dans l'arène
2017	"Du mal á m'y faire"	152	—	Dans l'arène
2018	"Non non"	33	—	Le revers de la médaille
2018	"Brassard"	37	24 (Ultratip*)	Le revers de la médaille
2018	"Tourner"	39	—	Le revers de la médaille
2018	"Ce qui est à nous"	44	—	Le revers de la médaille
2018	"Tu perds la foi"	65	—	Le revers de la médaille
2018	"Zumba"	67	—	Le revers de la médaille
2018	"C'est pas ça la vie"	70	—	Le revers de la médaille
2018	"En otage"	79	—	Le revers de la médaille
2018	"Fais du pain"	89	—	Le revers de la médaille
2018	"Privado"	100	—	Le revers de la médaille
2018	"Poto j'suis là"	104	—	Le revers de la médaille
2018	"Zéro"	117	—	Le revers de la médaille
2018	"Ciroc"	123	—	Le revers de la médaille
2018	"On avance seuls"	146	—	Le revers de la médaille
2018	"Du mal á m'y faire"	152	—	Le revers de la médaille
2018	"C63"	59	—	Le revers de la médaille - Partie 2
2018	"Représenter"	66	—	Le revers de la médaille - Partie 2
2018	"Meuf mortelle"	110	—	Le revers de la médaille - Partie 2
2018	"La vérité"	118	—	Le revers de la médaille - Partie 2
2018	"Palace"	120	—	Le revers de la médaille - Partie 2
2018	"Mon ami"	122	—	Le revers de la médaille - Partie 2
2018	"J'sais plus comment faire"	148	—	Le revers de la médaille - Partie 2
2018	"Je zone"	179	—	Le revers de la médaille - Partie 2
2019	"Drôle de mentalité"	29	—	Drôle de mentalité
2019	"Forza"	68	—	Drôle de mentalité
2019	"Bécane volée"	114	—	Drôle de mentalité
2019	"Ganja"	116	—	Drôle de mentalité
2019	"Nouvel R"	117	—	Drôle de mentalité
2019	"Hanter"	118	—	Drôle de mentalité
2019	"Zoo"	128	—	Drôle de mentalité
2019	"Croire"	135	—	Drôle de mentalité
2019	"Le mal m'appelle"	142	—	Drôle de mentalité
2019	"Quitter les cours"	155	—	Drôle de mentalité
2019	"Au fond de la classe"	159	—	Drôle de mentalité
2021	"Plein les poches"	10	—	Spleen
2021	"BB"	14	—	Spleen
2021	"Moi-même"	15	—	Spleen
2021	"La cage et la clef"	16	—	Spleen
2021	"Demain sera meilleur"	18	—	Spleen
2021	"Essayez"	20	—	Spleen
2021	"Certitude"	22	—	Spleen
2021	"Mailler"	24	—	Spleen
2021	"Ancolie"	27	—	Spleen
2021	"Paré"	28	—	Spleen
2021	"Loyal"	30	—	Spleen
2021	"Anonymat"	32	—	Spleen
2021	"Loup"	40	—	Spleen
2021	"Spleen"	42	—	Spleen
2021	"Ça va aller"	47	—	Spleen
2023	"Alpha"	8	—	Alpha
2023	"Full Black"	13	—	Alpha
2023	"Pas Là"	15	—	Alpha
2023	"J'Connais"	16	—	Alpha
2023	"Avenue"	24	—	Alpha
2023	"Mayday"	27	—	Alpha
2023	"L'Escalier"	29	—	Alpha
2023	"Moi Aussi"	30	—	Alpha
2023	"Toujours La Méme"	37	—	Alpha
2023	"L'Essentiel"	52	—	Alpha
2023	"J'RéfléChis"	53	—	Alpha
2023	"Envahir"	56	—	Alpha
2023	"Outro"	62	—	Alpha
2023	"Coller"	67	—	Alpha
2023	"Le Métier"	69	—	Alpha
2023	"Everyday"	72	—	Alpha
2023	"Intro"	77	—	Alpha
2025	"En Vrai de Vrai"	62	—	
2025	"En Bas"	70	—	
2025	"J'Viens D'La"	85	—	
2025	"Au Front"	90	—	
2025	"Gustavo"	91	—	
2025	"Tu Sais"	47	—	

*Did not appear in the official Belgian Ultratop 50 charts, but rather in the bubbling under Ultratip charts.
