= Paléo Festival =

Annual music festival in Nyon, Switzerland

Coordinates: 46°24′18.36″N 6°12′43.56″E

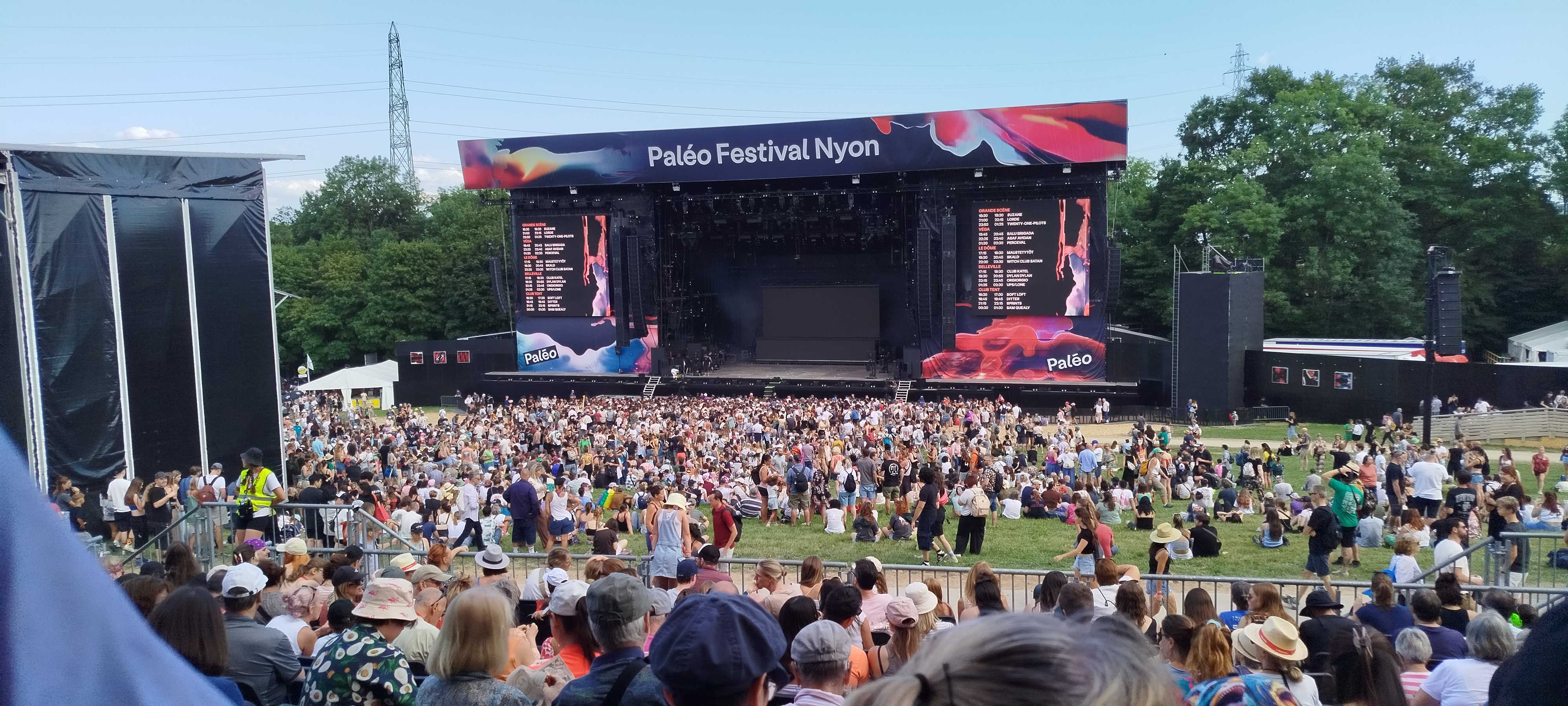
- Genre: Rock music
- Dates: end of July, from Tuesday to Sunday
- Locations: Plaine de l'Asse; Nyon, Switzerland
- Years active: 1976–present
- Website: Festival Website

The Paléo Festival de Nyon, usually just called Paléo, is an annual open-air festival held in Nyon, Switzerland. It is one of the major open-air music festivals in mainland Europe and the biggest in Switzerland. Both a springboard for young talent and a showcase for established artists, Paléo has gradually opened up to all musical styles, as well as to the circus and street arts. The festival lasts six days at the end of July, from Tuesday to Sunday, and the final main stage concert is preceded by a great firework display with music.

It started in 1976 under the name "Nyon Folk Festival". The first edition was held in the village hall in Nyon and brought 1800 spectators. The following editions, from 1977 until 1989, were held at Colovray, Nyon, by Lake Geneva and had only two stages. In 1986 the festival is renamed "Paléo Nyon Festival". In 1990, it moved to its current location, at the Plaine de l'Asse.

Since its inception, the festival has hosted more than 4,000 artists and welcomed nearly 8 million spectators. By 2025, it was recognized by the European Festivals Association (Yourope) as the "Best Major European Festival," maintained by a team of approximately 5,000 volunteers and 120 permanent staff members.

== Stages ==
The Paléo features six stages:

- La Grande Scène (the Main Stage)
- Vega (Which replaced Les Arches in 2022)
- Le Club Tent (the Club Tent)
- La Ruche (the hive) (formerly called 'La Crique')
- Le Dôme (the Dome)
- Belleville (since 2022, dedicated to electronic music)
- Le Détour (regional bands now located inside the festival, formerly called 'FMR' which was a free stage)

Since 2003, the Paléo has introduced Le Village du Monde (The World Village) section, which is a space reserved for an invited region of the world. This place offers the region's culture and food. It also includes Le Dôme which shows only artists from the invited region.

280,000 visitors and over 5,000 staff participated in the 2015 event.

== Tickets ==
Tickets can be purchased on the Paléo Website. Special offers are available usually as early as November of the year preceding the next Paléo festival with discounted all-week passes. Later in Spring the official programme is published and the second, slightly less discounted tickets are available. They are often sold out very quickly. In the months preceding the festival more tickets are sold at full price.

To fight black-market ticket sales, 1500 one-day tickets are held up to be sold the same day as their validity date and can be purchased online (to be printed by the buyer).

The lineup used to be revealed on a late April Wednesday at noon, following which, both tickets and passes would sell out within days. From 2008 onwards, the lineup is unveiled one week prior to the sale, giving people plenty of time to make up their mind and thus rushing them online to get their tickets one week later. In 2009, all 280,000 tickets and passes were sold in a record one-and-a-half hours.

== Yearly summary ==
=== 1997 ===
Invited artists:

- Al Jarreau
- Eddy Mitchell
- IAM
- Isaac Hayes
- Jamiroquai
- Jane Birkin
- Johnny Clegg & Savuka
- Khaled
- Morcheeba
- Noa
- Noir Désir
- Pascal Obispo
- Placebo
- Shaggy
- Simple Minds
- Sinéad O'Connor
- Suzanne Vega
- Texas

For a full list see the 1997 history.

=== 1998 ===
Invited artists:

- Charles Trenet
- Claude Nougaro
- Dolly
- Eagle-Eye Cherry
- Faudel
- Herbie Hancock
- IAM
- Jean-Louis Aubert
- Joe Cocker
- K's Choice
- Linton Kwesi Johnson
- Louise Attaque
- -M-
- MC Solaar
- Patricia Kaas
- Portishead
- The Prodigy
- The Wailers
- Run-D.M.C.
- Stereophonics
- Yann Tiersen

For a full list see the 1998 history.

=== 1999 ===
Invited artists:

- Alliance Ethnik
- Ben Harper
- Celia Cruz
- Charles Aznavour
- Cheb Mami
- Fun Lovin' Criminals
- Garbage
- Gotthard
- Iggy Pop
- Stephan Eicher

For a full list see the 1999 history.

=== 2000 ===
Invited artists:

- Beck
- Bloodhound Gang
- Buena Vista Social Club
- Compay Segundo
- Rita Mitsouko
- Louise Attaque
- Massilia Sound System
- Mickey 3D
- Morcheeba
- Muse
- Noir Désir
- Oasis
- Patrick Bruel
- Pink Martini
- Renaud
- Saian Supa Crew

For a full list see the 2000 history.

=== 2001 ===
Invited artists:

- Ben Harper
- Kool & the Gang
- Lynda Lemay
- Manu Chao
- Natalia M. King
- Placebo
- Red Snapper
- St. Germain
- Texas
- The Young Gods
- Tom McRae
- Vanessa Paradis

For a full list see the 2001 history.

=== 2002 ===
Invited artists:

- Zucchero
- Yann Tiersen
- The Cure
- Supertramp
- Pet Shop Boys
- MC Solaar
- Jovanotti
- Noir Désir
- Indochine
- James Brown

For a full list see the 2002 history.

=== 2003 ===
Invited artists:

- Asian Dub Foundation
- R.E.M.
- Alanis Morissette
- Ibrahim Ferrer
- Jimmy Cliff
- Massive Attack
- Nada Surf
- Renaud
- Ska-P
- The Cardigans

For a full list see the 2003 history.

This year saw the first Village du Monde. Africa was invited with Cameroon, Nigeria and other countries from that continent.

=== 2004 ===
Invited artists:

- Eros Ramazzotti
- Jamel Debbouze (a French comedian in the festival's only non-musical show scheduled on the main scene)
- Pascal Obispo
- Peter Gabriel
- Stephan Eicher
- Starsailor
- Texas
- Muse
- Myslovitz (From Poland)

Latin America was invited at the Village du Monde. Specifically Venezuela, Colombia, Equator, Peru and Mexico among others.

For a full list see the 2004 history.

=== 2005 ===
In 2005, the following world-renowned artists participated at the Paléo (among many others):

- Lenny Kravitz
- George Clinton (funk musician)
- Jamiroquai
- Starsailor
- Rammstein
- Samael
- IAM
- Stress
- Pink Martini
- Babylon Circus
- Franz Ferdinand

That year was considered very successful, with a cool but clear weather for most of the week (except some short showers on Sunday). Asia was the region invited to the Village du Monde, including China, Tibet, Nepal, Vietnam, Thailand and Japan.

For a full list see the 2005 history.

=== 2006 ===
Paléo took place from 18 to 23 July 2006 with the following artists:

- Depeche Mode
- Placebo
- The Who
- Tracy Chapman
- Ben Harper and the Innocent Criminals
- Pixies
- Goldfrapp
- Ziggy Marley
- HIM
- The Dandy Warhols
- Dub Incorporation
- Benabar
- Feeder
- The Kooks
- Indochine
- Hateful Monday

Eastern Europe hosted the Village du Monde.

For a full list see the 2006 history.

=== 2007 ===
- Björk
- Muse
- Arctic Monkeys
- Jean-Louis Murat
- Rachid Taha
- Arcade Fire
- Arno
- Malouma
- Pink
- Robert Plant
- Laurent Voulzy
- Grand Corps Malade
- Joey Starr
- Stress
- Oxmo Puccino
- Daby Toure
- Zucchero
- Lynda Lemay
- Ayo
- Groundation
- Bitty Mc Lean feat. Sly & Robbie
- Tryo
- Sanseverino
- Emily Loizeau
- Gad Elmaleh
- Air
- The Young Gods
- Cassius
- Renaud
- Zazie
- Gogol Bordello
- The Locos
- La Ruda
- Tinariwen
- Michel Corboz
- Natacha Atlas
- Idir

For a full list see the 2007 history.

=== 2008 ===
- The Hives
- The Raveonettes
- Massive Attack
- Mika
- Yael Naïm
- R.E.M.
- Justice

R.E.M. headlined the Sunday night.

For a full list see the 2008 history.

=== 2009 ===
2009 edition of Paléo took place from the 21 to 26 July 2009. Below list includes some of the musicians who performed during the concert:

- Sunny Lakherwal
- Rohit Rattan
- Gautam Bagri
- Rodrigo Y Gabriela
- Moby
- Amy Macdonald
- Placebo
- The Ting Tings
- Kaiser Chiefs
- Tracy Chapman
- Rishipal Singh Padha
- Ayo
- Gossip
- The Prodigy
- Fatboy Slim
- Pete Doherty
- TV On The Radio
- Franz Ferdinand
- Sophie Hunger
- White Lies
- Izia
- Daily Bread
- The Bianca Story
- Peter Kernel
- Girls in the Kitchen
- The V.AC.
- The Young Gods play "Woodstock"
- Ghinzu
- Pascale Picard Band
- Peter von Poehl
- The Black Box Revelation
- Yodelice
- Bonaparte
- Mama Rosin
- Thomas More Project
- Commodor
- 2manydjs
- Hugh Coltman
- Karkwa
- Naive New Beaters
- Heidi Happy
- Tim & Puma Mimi
- Brutus
- Charlie Winston
- Naive New Beaters
- Toboggan
- Gautam Bagri
- Josef Of The Fountain
- Santigold (ex Santogold)
- Cold War Kids
- Caravan Palace
- Grace
- Evelinn Trouble & Trespassers
- DatA
- Kate Wax
- Nancy Glowbus
- The Proteins
- Trilok Gurtu
- Anaïs
- Julien Doré
- La Chanson du Dimanche
- Dhoad Gypsies from Rajahsthan
- Masaladosa
- Kiran Ahluwalia
- Dhabi
- Olli & the Bollywood Orchestra
- Alborosie
- Omar Perry & Homegrown Band
- Takana Zion
- La Pulqueria
- Rohit Rattan
- Achanak
- Ska-P
- Zone Libre vs Casey & B. James
- La Pulqueria
- Tumi and the Volume
- Ska Nerfs
- Francis Cabrel
- Les Ogres de Barback
- La Grande Sophie
- Debout Sur Le Zinc
- Zedrus
- Raghunath Manet
- Karsh Kale & MIDIval Punditz
- Musafir - Gypsies of Rajasthan
- Jaipur Maharaja Brass Band
- Abd al Malik
- Oxmo Puccino
- La Gale et Rynox
- Trip In
- Tweek

India was the region invited to the Village du Monde.

For a full list see the 2009 history.

=== 2010 ===
In 2010, the festival was held from July 20 to July the 24th. Some of the performing artists included:

- N*E*R*D
- Iggy and The Stooges
- Motörhead
- Damien Saez
- Suprême NTM
- Two Door Cinema Club
- Charlie Winston
- Foals
- Crosby, Stills & Nash
- Johnny Clegg
- Milow
- Archive
- Gentleman & The Evolution
- Sens Unik
- Jamiroquai
- Plastiscines
- John Butler Trio
- Paolo Nutini
- Klaxons
- Indochine

The Motto for the Village du Monde was Southern Africa.

For a full list see the 2010 history.

=== 2011 ===
The 2011 edition of the Paléo Festival took place from Tuesday, July the 19th to Sunday, July the 24th. The following list includes some of the acts that were confirmed on the 5th of April:

- AaRON
- Admiral James T.
- Jean-Louis Aubert
- Beirut
- Bloody Beetroots
- James Blunt
- The Chemical Brothers
- Cocoon
- Les Cowboys Fringants
- The Dø
- PJ Harvey
- Jack Johnson
- Mika (replaced Amy Winehouse)
- Metronomy
- Moriarty
- Yael Naïm
- The National
- Noisettes
- Patrice & The Supowers
- Robert Plant & The Band of Joy
- Portishead
- Pulled Apart By Horses
- The Strokes
- Stromae
- Tarun Bhardwaj Ambala Waale
- Amy Winehouse (canceled her European Tour due to alcohol problems)
- William White
- Zaz and her band

The Motto for the Village du Monde was the Caribbean.

For a full list see the 2011 history.

=== 2012 ===
17 July

- Manu Chao
- Franz Ferdinand
- Hubert-Félix Thiéfaine
- Camille
- Brigitte
- M83
- Quentin Mottier
- Baba Zula

18 July

- The Cure
- Justice
- Mashrou' Leila
- Natacha Atlas
- Dionysos
- Bon Iver
- Dominique A
- Other Lives
- Warpaint

19 July

- Sting
- Stephan Eicher
- Caravan Palace
- Chinese Man
- Groundation
- Raggasonic
- Le Nico Baillod Band
- Le Trio Joubran

20 July

- Lenny Kravitz
- Rodrigo y Gabriela
- Imany
- Irma
- Orelsan
- 1995
- C2C

21 July

- Garbage
- Bloc Party
- The Kooks
- The Kills
- Bénabar
- Thomas Dutronc
- GiedRé
- Agoria
- Avishai Cohen

22 July

- David Guetta
- Roger Hodgson
- Kev Adams
- 77 Bombay Street
- Maxime Vengerov

=== 2013 ===
23 July

- Neil Young and Crazy Horse
- Two Gallants
- Phoenix
- Sophie Hunger
- Alt-J
- Lou Doillon

24 July

- Arctic Monkeys
- The Smashing Pumpkins
- Asaf Avidan
- Beach House
- Dranko Jones
- The Bloody Beetroots

25 July

- Dub Incorporation
- Santana
- Tryo
- Stupeflip
- Sigur Rós
- Kadebostany

26 July

- Nick Cave and the Bad Seeds
- -M-
- Youssoupha
- Keny Arkana

27 July

- Blur
- BB Brunes
- Damien Saez
- Benjamin Biolay
- Kavinsky
- Oxmo Puccino

28 July

- Patrick Bruel
- Bastian Baker
- Michaël Grégorio
- Raphael
- Paul Meyer with Le Concert Européen

=== 2014 ===
- Vincent Veillon et Vincent Kucholl
- Seasick Steve
- Thirty Seconds to Mars

=== 2015 ===
- Robbie Williams
- Gary Clark Jr.

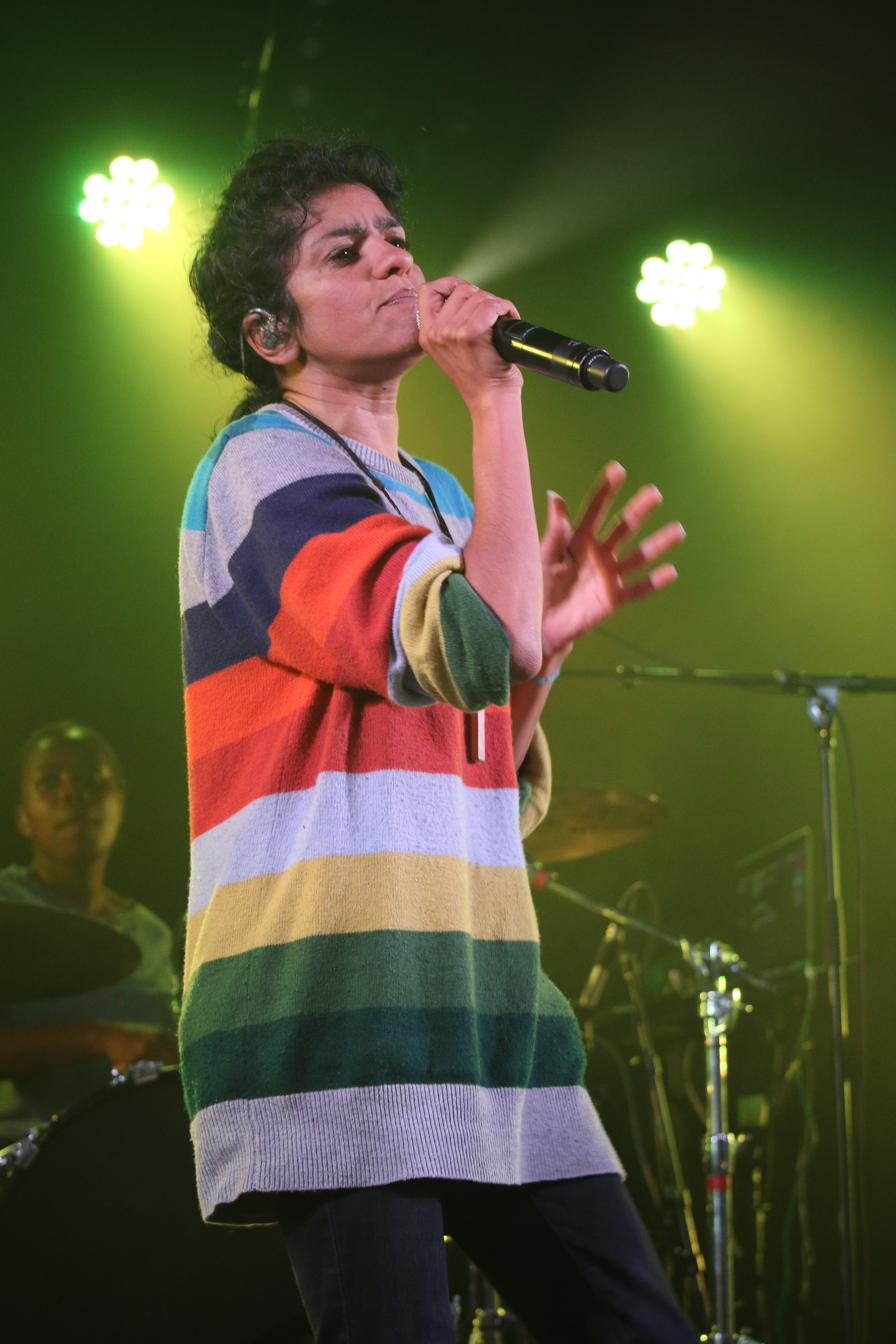
Soom T at the Paléo Festival in Nyon, Switzerland on 24 July 2016

=== 2016 ===
- Muse
- Bastille
- Soom T

=== 2017 ===
- Red Hot Chili Peppers
- Arcade Fire
- Macklemore and Ryan Lewis
- Foals
- Pixies
- Black M
- Christophe Maé
- Petit Biscuit
- Midnight Oil
- Lola Marsh

=== 2018 ===
- Gorillaz
- The Killers
- Lenny Kravitz
- Kaleo
- Depeche Mode
- Indochine
- MGMT
- Jain
- Jamel Debbouze
- Romeo Elvis
- Suprême NTM
- Nekfeu
- Bigflo & Oli
- Angèle
- Feder
- Lorenzo
- Orelsan
- Emir Kusturica & The No Smoking Orchestra

=== 2019 ===
Headliners
Tuesday 23 July	Wednesday 24 July	Thursday 25 July	Friday 26 July	Saturday 27 July	Sunday 28 July
Twenty One Pilots; Christine and the Queens; Charlotte Gainsbourg; Les Cowboys Fringants	Lana Del Rey; -M-; The Blaze	The Cure; Lomepal	Soprano; Damso; Angèle; Hubert-Félix Thiéfaine	Shaka Ponk; Stephan Eicher & Traktorkestar	Patrick Bruel; Birkin Gainsbourg; Dadju

=== 2020 ===
The 2020 edition was cancelled due to the COVID-19 pandemic.

=== 2021 ===
The 2021 edition was cancelled due to the COVID-19 pandemic.

=== 2022 ===
Tuesday 19 July	Wednesday 20 July	Thursday 21 July	Friday 22 July	Saturday 23 July	Sunday 24 July
KISS; -M-; Dropkick Murphys; La Femme; Turnstile; Panda Dub; Perturbator; O.B.G & Charlie P & Sr Wilson; Mungo's Hi Fi; The Murder Capital; Silver Dust; Arka'n Asrafokor; Santrofi; BROKEN BRIDGE; Guiss Guiss Bou Bess; Ubik All Stars feat. Nello B; Little Lion Sound	Sting; Rag'n'Bone Man; Metronomy; Feu! Chatterton; Fatoumata Diawara; Mall Grab; Suzane; Bombino; Sama' Abdulhadi; Laolu; YĪN YĪN; Marius Bear; P.R2B; Marina Satti; Santrofi; BIM; Psycho Weazel (Dj-set); Bowmore	Angèle; Francis Cabrel; Roméo Elvis; Dub Inc; Chilla; Red Axes; Third World; Queen Omega; Blaiz Fayah; Manudigtal & Caporal Negus; Michel; Flèche Love; GLITTER55; Ami Yèrèwolo; Art Melody; BIM; DC Salas (Live); Ramin&Reda; Pornopolis	DJ Snake; PNL; SCH; Grand Corps Malade; Seun Kuti & Egypt 80; Juliette Armanet; BARON.E; Billx; Arma Jackson; Berywam; ascendant vierge; Mara; Makoto San; Elida Almeida; GARGÄNTUA; Barrio Colette; AMAMI; Star Feminine Band; Rōse	OrelSan; Ninho; Tryo; Têtes Raides; Gaël Faye; Folamour; Sopico; Kingzer; Kampire; Songhoy Blues; Bleu Jeans Bleu; Glauque; Coco Em; Meta and The Cornerstones; Ozadya; FOKN Bois; Nuri; Les Fils du Facteur; Schnautzi	Stromae; Orchestre des Hautes écoles de musique de Suisse romande; MEUTE; Little Simz; Cimafunk; Catastrophe; FLOHIO; James BKS; Mezerg; L'Exclair; Vaudou Game; Julien Granel; Zenobia; Arthur Hnatek; Kety Fusco; Kajeem; Club Katel

=== 2023 ===
Wednesday 19 July	Thursday 20 July	Friday 21 July	Saturday 22 July	Sunday 23 July
Black Eyed Peas; Louise Attaque; Phoenix; Interpol; Frank Carter & The Rattlesnakes; NTO; Noga Erez; Sampa the Great; Lewis OfMan; Adekunle Gold; La Jungle; Romane Santarelli; Tássia Reis; João Selva; Bia Ferreira; Fomies; Ego Pusher; Son Rompe Pera	Rosalía; Lomepal; Pomme; Polo & Pan; Sigur Rós; Pierre de Maere; KT Gorique; ELOI; ØTTA; Winnterzuko; Zaho de Sagazan; Baby Volcano; Yoa; Crème solaire; BNegão; Bia Ferreira; Canelle Doublekick; Bala Desejo	Placebo; Shaka Ponk; Jain; Kungs; alt-J; Daniel Avery; Helena Hauff; Nova Twins; Emicida; Bianca Costa; Owelle; Diskopunk; TechnoBrass; Satellites	Martin Garrix; Bigflo & Oli; Lorenzo; Josman; Max Romeo; Biga*Ranx; La P'tite Fumée; Mandidextrous; Lila Iké; Yung Singh; Céu; Chico César; Buunshin; Luther; Nathalie Froehlich; Oete; Edgar; Femme Fatale; Xana Romeo; Azizzi Romeo	Aya Nakamura; Damso; Dinos; Maxime le Forestier; Ibrahim Maalouf; Imany; Lous and The Yakuza; Yilian Cañizares; Deki Alem; FlexFab; Ziller Bas; Alina Pash; Uzi Freyja; Catu Diosis; Fulu Miziki Kolektiv; DJ Travella; Lia de Tamaracá; Naomi Lareine; Cabruêra

=== 2024 ===
Tuesday 23 July	Wednesday 24 July	Thursday 25 July	Friday 26 July	Saturday 27 July	Sunday 28 July
Burna Boy; Sean Paul; Patti Smith; Paul Kalkbrenner; Royal Blood; Khruangbin; Meryl; Maureen; Dubioza Kolektiv; Panic Shack; Maraboutage; Lalalar; Aunty Rayzor; Džambo Aguševi Orchestra; Train Fantôme; Sami Galbi; ASNA; Yalla Miku	Sam Smith; Nile Rodgers & Chic; AURORA; Zaho da Sagazan; Eddy de Pretto; Worakls Orchestra; Aime Simone; Haïdouti Orkestar; 999999999; Clara Ysé; Miel De Montagne; Héctor Oaks; LUCKY LOVE; Estella Boersma; Božo Vrećo; Bohemian Betyars; Ariane Roy; Orphia	PLK; Calogero; Hoshi; Luidji; Julian Marley; Vladimir Cauchemar; Nuit Incolore; Boban Marković; Marina Satti; Gaye Su Akyol; Soom T; Sika Rlion; Lens; Kin'Gongolo Kiniata; Mollie Collins; Kara; SiLANCE; Sensu	Gazo; Tiakola; IAM; Véronique Sanson; Olivia Ruiz; Ziak; Julien Granel; Saliah; Slimka; Ahadadream; Lucie Antunes; Oratnitza; Twende Pamoja; Shkodra Elektronike; Balkalar; Tailor Jae; Sirens of Lesbos; Hirma	Booba; Major Lazer; The Blaze; L'Impératrice; Caravan Palace; Rounhaa; Yvnnis; Shantel; Alo Wala; Oratnitza; Balkan Taksim; DJ Lizz; Tomasa del Real; Lakna; Bianca Oblivion; Roshâni; Lateena; Bony Fly	Mika; Gims; Christophe Maé; Sofiane Pamart; Roberto Alagna; Goran Bregović; Tsew The Kid; horsegiirL; Kalika; Pat Burgener; Die Klar; DJ Kwame; TDJ; Gispy Groove; Divanhana; Ugo2hell

=== 2025 ===
Tuesday 22 July	Wednesday 23 July	Thursday 24 July	Friday 25 July	Saturday 26 July	Sunday 27 July
Macklemore; Justice; Simple Minds; Skunk Anansie; La Femme; Saïan Supa Celebration; Lambrini Girls; Moonchild Sanelly; Jersey; Kabeaushé; Sami Galbi; Maâlma Asmaa Hamzaoui & Bnat Timbouktou; Big Special; HiTech; Al-Qasar; Luvanga; Moictani; Sneaky Funk Squad; Fanfare du Losange; Johanne Baget	Will Smith; Kalash; Texas; Jean-Louis Aubert; Lost Frequencies; THEODORT; Judeline; Acid Arab; Sofiane Saidi; Black Sea Dahu; Six Sex; Imarhan; Johnny Jane; Rosa Pistola; Uche Yara; Aïta Mon Amour; Toccororo; Olympic Antigua; Tendinites; Sneaky Funk Squad; Sonic Roots; Tom MacNeill	Soprano; Julian Doré; Philippe Katerine; SDM; Hamza; Anetha; Styleto; Mairo; Audrey Danza; Chien Bleu; Les Franglaises; Satine; Effy; Alex Nantaya; Aïta Mon Amour; Boko Yout; Bab L'Bluz; Labass; Sneaky Funk Squad; Sonic Roots	Ninho; Niska; Clara Luciani; Santa; Ben Mazue; TIF; Danakil; ElGrandeToto; Kabaka Pyramid; Youssef Swatt's; Bamby; Nooriyah; Emel; Ele A; Twinkle; Me & George; Santo; Mulah; Boutcha Bwa; Taste N-Imal; Sneaky Funk Squad; Sonic Roots; Retro Cassetta; Chao Ensemble	Queens of the Stone Age; Zaho de Sagazan; Sex Pistols featuring Frank Carter; Pierre Garnier; Ascendant Vierge; Ultra Vomit; Last Train; Théa; Coilguns; Fredz; Charlie Tee; Flava D; Fléche Love; Sofiane Saidi; La Louuve; Chalk; Anaïs; Zar Electrik; Rosa Pagano; Sneaky Funk Squad; Retro Cassetta; Vee Murakati	David Guetta; Rilés; Nemo; TRINIX; PERCEVAL; Piche; Faada Freddy; Zorza; Milune; Minna-No-Kimochi; Sinfonia Valais; Noura Mint Seymali; Rau_Ze; Aziza Brahim; DJ Caline; La Louuve; Sneaky Funk Squad; Zaila; KYMA; Compost Collaps

=== 2026 ===
Tuesday 21 July	Wednesday 22 July	Thursday 23 July	Friday 24 July	Saturday 25 July	Sunday 26 July
Twenty One Pilots; Lorde; Asaf Avidan; Suzane; PERCEVAL; Balu Brigada; Upsilone; Sam Quealy; SKÁLD; Sprints; okgiorgio; Soft Loft; Ditter; Dylan Dylan; Club Katel; Maustetytöt; Witch Club Satan	The Cure; Feu! Chatterton; The Last Dinner Party; The Young Gods; Kompromat; Sam Sauvage; Ásgeir; Sylvie Kreusch; Eivør; Jen Cardini; Kendal; St Graal; Bound By Endogamy; Max Baby; Zaatar; Nonante; Witch Club Satan	Gorillaz; Theodora; Amelie Lens; Disiz; Morcheeba; Saint Levant; Ino Casablanca; Miki; Riria; Marie Jay; Diffrent; Nusantara Beat; Steve 'n' Seagulls; Camille Doe; Joshua Idehen; Antti Paalanen; Braises De Veloures; Hindarfjäll	Orselan; Keny Arkana; Julien Clerc; Mosimann; Yamê; Solann; Björn Again; Urumi; DJ Schnake; Eihwar; Camille Yembe; Sueïlo; Roxane; Legit Girl; Värttinä; Estelle Zamme; Nashwa; Katarina Barruk	Katy Perry; Helena; Vald; Vladimir Cauchemar; Todiefor; Vanessa Paradis; Jok'Air; Adèle Castillon; marguerite; La Valentina; Kabylie Minogue; LinLin; Marara Kelly; Dope Saint Jude; Deize Tigrona; Doucesoeur; ETO; Linapary; Teksti-TV 666; Tarrak; Trolska Polska	Gims; Timmy Trumpet; Bob Sinclar; Zaz; Roni Size; Luiza; Carmina Burana; THK; Little Lion Sound; Basta Lion; Xana Romeo; Omega Nebula; Esaïa; Open Season; Tuuletar; Hilløsa; Trolska Polska

== See also ==
- List of historic rock festivals
- List of jam band music festivals
