= 17 Hippies =

Band from Berlin, Germany

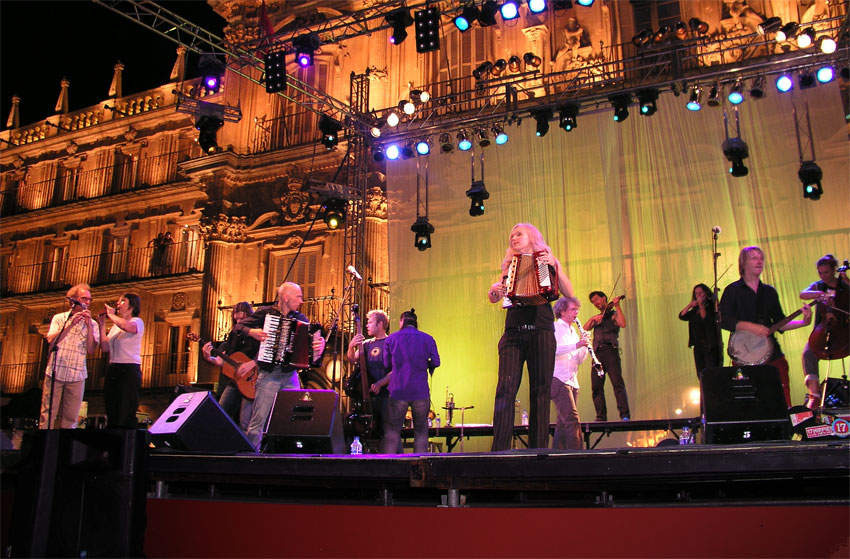
- 17 Hippies performing in Salamanca in September 2006.

Background information
- Origin: Berlin, Germany
- Genres: pop, folk
- Years active: 1995–present
- Labels: Hipster Records, Berlin; Buda Musique, Paris
- Members: Antje Henkel; Benjamin Ostarek; Christopher Blenkinsop; Daniel "Danda" Cordes; Dirk Trageser; Kiki Sauer; Knut Hagedorn; Paul Brody; Uwe Langer; Volker "Kruisko" Rettmann
- Website: 17hippies.de

17 Hippies is a band from Berlin, Germany, playing largely on acoustic instruments, a radically democratic collective of professionals and amateurs. Their music is a confection of various folk influences. They are most popular in their native Germany and France.

== History ==
The band was founded in 1995 in Berlin by Christopher Blenkinsop (bouzouki, ukulele and vocals), Carsten Wegener (bass), Lutz "Lüül" Ulbrich (banjo and guitar), Kristin "Kiki" Sauer (accordion and vocals) and Reinhard "Koma" Lüderitz (bagpipes). They first used the name 17 Hippies in the fall of that year.

In 1996 they began to organize their own series of free concerts called Hippie Haus Tanz (Hippie House Dance). At this time Antje Henkel (clarinet), Elmar Gutmann (trumpet), and Ulrike "Rike" Lau (cello) joined the band. In 1997 Henry Notroff (clarinet) and Dirk Trageser (guitar & vocals) also were added, and live recordings of different concerts and rehearsal room sessions were compiled into their first CD Rock'n'Roll 13. In 1998 they played at the SXSW Festival in Austin, Texas and then toured in Texas and Louisiana. Later that year Uwe Langer (trombone) joined the band and they played in Paris for the first time.

They established their own record label and in 1999 released their second CD Wer ist das? (Who is that?). The French label Buda Musique released a compilation of both CDs called Berlin Style, which was then also released in Italy. Volker "Kruisko" Rettmann (accordion) joined the band.

In 2001 the band wrote the score for the German movie Grill Point (Halbe Treppe) by Andreas Dresen and they performed in a cameo role in the film. A tour of Budapest, Prague, Vienna and France took place, and the second French album Sirba was released, featuring their first radio hit "Marlène". Kerstin Kaernbach (violin) also was added to the band lineup. Their first studio album Ifni was released in 2004. An extensive tour of Germany, Switzerland, the Netherlands, Belgium, Hungary, the Czech Republic, Morocco and France ensued. Daniel Friederichs (violin) became the last member to join the current lineup. In 2006 the band made a tour of Japan and Spain and composed the music for the play Kasimir and Karoline, staged at the Deutsches Theater in Berlin.

In 2007, a second studio album, Heimlich (Secretly), was released in Europe and North America. In September they embarked on their first US tour, playing in Chicago, New York, Washington and Bloomington. In December they played at the Olympia in Paris. In 2008, their earlier albums were released in the UK by Proper Records, they toured the US twice, and they played festivals in Germany, France, the UK, Canada, Spain, Switzerland, Ireland, Greece, and Algeria.

In 2009 they released their third studio album El Dorado, the first of their albums to be released worldwide. Again the band went on an extensive world tour, that took them to 14 countries including China, the US, Israel and Jordan. Concert highlights included appearances at WOMAD in Charlton Park (UK), and a sold-out show at the Théâtre de la Ville in Paris. In 2011 they performed a concert at the WOMAD New Zealand, in Taranaki, New Zealand. A one-hour broadcast was later played on Radio New Zealand National on 1 July 2011.

In 2011 JD Foster co-produced their album Phantom Songs. Since then they have added Mexico to their list of countries visited, recorded an album for children called Titus in 2013 and recorded an album featuring percussionists, including Aly Keita, Harald Grosskopf and Tunji Beier, called Biester (Beasts) in 2014. For their 20th anniversary they invited musicians they had met on their tours to collaborate in a special project called Metamorphosis. The idea was to record a 17 Hippies tune and then pass it on to another musician to further work on the track. Resulting music was published on the album of the same name, featuring Elyas Khan, Marc Ribot, Mars Red Sky, Tunji Beier, Banda Bardo, Aris Doryono and Les Ogres de Barback (among others). The album was released together with the best of album Anatomy in 2016.

== Style ==
Their style is a unique mix of Eastern European melodies and rhythms, with French chanson and American folk music. They sing mainly in German, English and French. In France their music is known as Berlin Style.

== Sideline projects ==
=== Sexy Ambient Hippies ===
Since 1997 the 17 Hippies occasionally play with DJs and electronic musicians as the "Sexy Ambient Hippies", with major concerts in Paris, Berlin and Munich. Among the featured artists are Carsten Dane from Hamburg, and Robert Cummings from Canada. The concert at the Pop d’Europe festival in Berlin on 31 August 2002 was recorded, and released on CD in 2003.

=== Hardcore Troubadors ===
Together with Les Hurlements d'Léo from Bordeaux, they recorded an EP with six songs. After giving concerts in Moscow, and going on a French tour, the album was released in France by Wagram Music in 2004.

=== 17 Hippies Play Guitar ===
On 19 December 2004, a concert for German national radio WDR in Cologne, featuring the two electric guitarists Marc Ribot and Jakob Ilja, was recorded and released on CD in 2006.

=== 17 Hippies and the Beat ===
In September 2008 they invited the percussionist Johnny Kalsi of the Dhol Foundation in London to play with them. A first concert was given on 12 September in Dortmund, Germany and was broadcast live by German public radio WDR.

== Discography ==
- Rock’n’roll 13 : 1997 | CD, Rent a Poet
- Texas Radio : 1998 | MC, Rent a Poet
- Wer ist das? : 1999 | CD, Rent a Poet
- Sirba : 2002 | CD, Buda Musique
- Soundtrack for the film Halbe Treppe : 2002 | CD, Rent a Poet
- 17 Hippies play Sexy Ambient Hippies : 2003 | CD, Rent a Poet
- Ifni : 2004 | CD, Rent a Poet
- Live in Berlin : 2005 | DVD, Rent a Poet
- 17 Hippies Play Guitar : 2006 | CD, Hipster Records
- Live in Berlin : 2006 | CD, Hipster Records/Proper Music
- Heimlich : 2007 | CD & LP, Hipster Records/Proper Music
- El Dorado : 2009 | CD & LP, Hipster Records/Proper Music
- Phantom Songs : 2011 | CD & LP, Hipster Records/Proper Music
- 17 Hippies chantent en français : 2013 | CD, Buda Musique
- 17 Hippies für Kinder - Titus träumt : 2013 | CD, Rent a Poet
- Biester : 2014 | CD & LP, Hipster Records/Proper Music
- Anatomy : 2016 | CD & LP, Rent a Poet
- Metamorphosis : 2016 | CD, Rent a Poet
- Kirschenzeit : 2019 | CD & LP, Rent a Poet
- 9.000 Nächte : 2022 | Download & App, Rent a Poet
- Clowns & Angels : 2025 | CD & LP, Rent a Poet

== Books ==
- 17 Hippies für Kinder : 1999 | Tyfoo Musikverlag, Berlin
- Realbook, Volume 1 : 2001 | Tyfoo Musikverlag, Berlin
- Realbook, Volume 2 : 2001 | Tyfoo Musikverlag, Berlin
