= LCDD (disambiguation) =

LCDD may refer to:

- Light chain deposition disease
- La Chanson du Dimanche, a musical group
- Linear Collider Detector Description, software for a linear collider
