= Steffi Kühnert =

German actress (born 1963)

- Born: 19 February 1963 (age 63); East Berlin, East Germany
- Occupation: Actress
- Years active: 1978–present

Steffi Kühnert (born 19 February 1963) is a German actress. She appeared in more than eighty films since 1978. Since November 2009, she has been a professor of acting at the Ernst Busch Academy of Dramatic Arts, where she was previously a guest lecturer. Kühnert has also been working as a theatre director at the Mecklenburg State Theatre in Schwerin and the Hans Otto Theatre in Potsdam since 2017.

== Selected filmography ==
Year	Title	Role	Notes
2002	Grill Point		
2008	Cloud 9		
2009	The White Ribbon		
2010	We Are the Night		
2011	Stopped on Track		
