= Silver Dust =

Swiss rock band

- Origin: Switzerland
- Genres: Rock; theatrical rock; heavy metal
- Years active: 2013–present
- Labels: Escudero Records (since 2015); Fastball Music (since 2017)
- Members: Lord Campbell; Kurghan; Neiros; Mr.Killjoy
- Past members: Tiny Pistol; Magma; Jayer; Cedric
- Website: www.silver-dust.net

Silver Dust is a Swiss rock band formed in 2013 in Porrentruy by the singer and guitarist Lord Campbell. He is especially known under his real name, Christian "Kiki" Crétin, as former professional ice hockey goaltender. After having performed on various stages in Switzerland, including the Montreux Jazz Festival, Silver Dust gained popularity throughout Europe thanks to their tours with the heavy metal Finnish bands Lordi (2016 and 2018) and Battle Beast (2017).

At the end of 2019, Silver Dust started their fourth European tour consisting of 50 dates in 26 countries together with Moonspell and Rotting Christ.

Silver Dust has paired music with a scenic performance on stage inspired by steampunk and Victorian. The band's style has been classified as "Burtonian" (referring to American filmmaker Tim Burton) and as "theatrical rock".

== History ==
=== Formation and early years — Lost In Time (2013-2015) ===
Silver Dust was formed in 2013 by singer and guitarist Lord Campbell. After having led many personal musical projects covering the songs of guitar-virtuosos such as Steve Vai and Joe Satriani, he decided to create a project that combines music and theatrical show. He invited bassist and longstanding friend Kurghan.

On May 25, 2013, Silver Dust released their first album, Lost In Time. A few months later, the band performed at the Montreux Jazz Festival and was chosen as the opening act in a number of national festivals, which offered them an opportunity to play together with such bands as Deftones, The Offspring, Eluvietie and Mass Hysteria. In addition, the song So Let Me Now was broadcast on the radio across Switzerland and its music video was a considerable success.

In 2014, two changes were made in the line-up. Firstly, the drummer Cedric left the band and was replaced by Mr.Killjoy. A few months later, guitarist Jayer decided to dedicate himself to his personal projects and was replaced by Tiny Pistol.

In February 2015, the band entered the studio to record their second album. They also announced the filming of a music video. At the end of the year, Silver Dust began a collaboration with the Swiss label Escudero Records.

=== Rise — The Age Of Decadence (2016-2017) ===
In early 2016, Silver Dust unveiled the name and cover of their new album The Age Of Decadence. On February 6, 2016, the band released the second music video for one of the songs from the new album, "My Heart Is My Savior".

On March 4, 2016, Silver Dust played the songs from the new album for the first time, during a concert organized in Neuchâtel. During the same night, the band unveiled a new show that would accompany the album, featuring themese of good and bad often represented through references to white magic and black magic. A large screen representing a magic mirror appeared on stage and was used to show images related to the played songs. In addition, the show was marked by the appearance of actors, including a cursed couple and some characters dressed in black cloaks and masks.

On April 7, 2016, Silver Dust won the finale of a contest organized by the Greenfield Festival and, as a result, was selected to share the stage with Nightwish and Amon Amarth. A few weeks later, the band released a new music video in collaboration with Carlyn Monnin, a Swiss lyric soprano, who contributed her voice on the unplugged version of the song "Forgive Me".

In the same year, Silver Dust hit the road for their first European tour together with the Finnish heavy metal band Lordi. The bands performed more than thirty times throughout Europe. After this tour, Silver Dust signed with the German label Fastball Music that arranged the release of The Age Of Decadence across the continent.

In November 2017, the quartet returned on European stages as the special guest of the Finnish heavy metal band Battle Beast. At the end of the year, Silver Dust ended The Age Of Decadence tour by announcing the upcoming release of their third album.

=== Revelation — House 21 (2018-2021) ===
In late March 2018, Silver Dust released a music video for Forever, a single from the album. In a similar way to the previous music videos, this one was filmed in Porrentruy, Switzerland.

On April 20, 2018, the band released its third album House 21 thought out as a concept album. It tells the story of a British soldier deserting the battlefield during World War II and taking refuge in a gloomy dwelling called House 21, populated by errant souls and strange characters. The album includes a collaboration with Mr. Lordi, from the eponym band, on a cover of Bette Davis Eyes.

A few months later, to the band's great surprise, Mr.Killjoy announced his decision to leave the band. He was then replaced by Diego "Magma" Rapacchietti, drummer from the Swiss band Coroner. In October of the same year, the band went on another tour with Lordi.

In July 2019, Silver Dust announced that their fourth European tour would take place at the end of the year, from October to December. For this occasion, the band toured with metal bands Moonspell and Rotting Christ. On March 1, 2020, the band announced the arrival of their new guitarist, Neiros.

=== Consecration — Lullabies (2022-present) ===
On April 29, 2022, Silver Dust released their fourth album, Lullabies. It reached the 8th position on the Metal Rock Charts in Germany. Throughout the year, Silver Dust performed at several festivals across Europe, sharing the stage with bands such as Kiss, Avatar, Scorpions, Sabaton, Powerwolf, Helloween, and Europe. The band's performances at Paléo Festival, Rock Imperium Festival, and Riverside Festival were highly acclaimed and well-received.

At the beginning of 2023, Silver Dust was invited to join the Swedish band Soen on a European tour as a special guest. Additionally, this year marked another milestone for the band as they performed at the Summerside Festival alongside acts such as Hollywood Vampires (featuring Alice Cooper, Johnny Depp, and Joe Perry) and Volbeat.

In July 2024, the band announced departure of their drummer Magma, who left the band for professional reasons. Drummer Mr. Killjoy, a former member of the group from 2014 to 2018, rejoined temporarily to fulfill scheduled performances, including headlining Hellfest Le Off, while the band searched for a new drummer.

On January 21, 2025, Silver Dust announced the return of Mr. Killjoy as their drummer, along with the release of a new album set for April 4, 2025.

== Members ==
=== Current members ===
- Lord Campbell – lead vocals, guitar
- Kurghan – bass, backing vocals
- Neiros – guitar, backing vocals
- Mr.Killjoy – drums

=== Former members ===
- Tiny Pistol – guitar, backing vocals (2014-2020)
- Magma – drums (2018-2024)
- Jayer – guitar, backing vocals (2013-2014)
- Cedric – drums (2013-2014)

== Discography ==
=== Studio albums ===
- 2013 : Lost In Time
- 2016 : The Age Of Decadence
- 2018 : House 21
- 2022 : Lullabies

=== Music videos ===
- 2014 : So Let Me Know
- 2016 : My Heart Is My Savior
- 2016 : Forgive Me (unplugged version)
- 2018 : Forever
- 2022 : There's A Place Where I Can Go
