= La Pulquería =

Spanish punk rock band

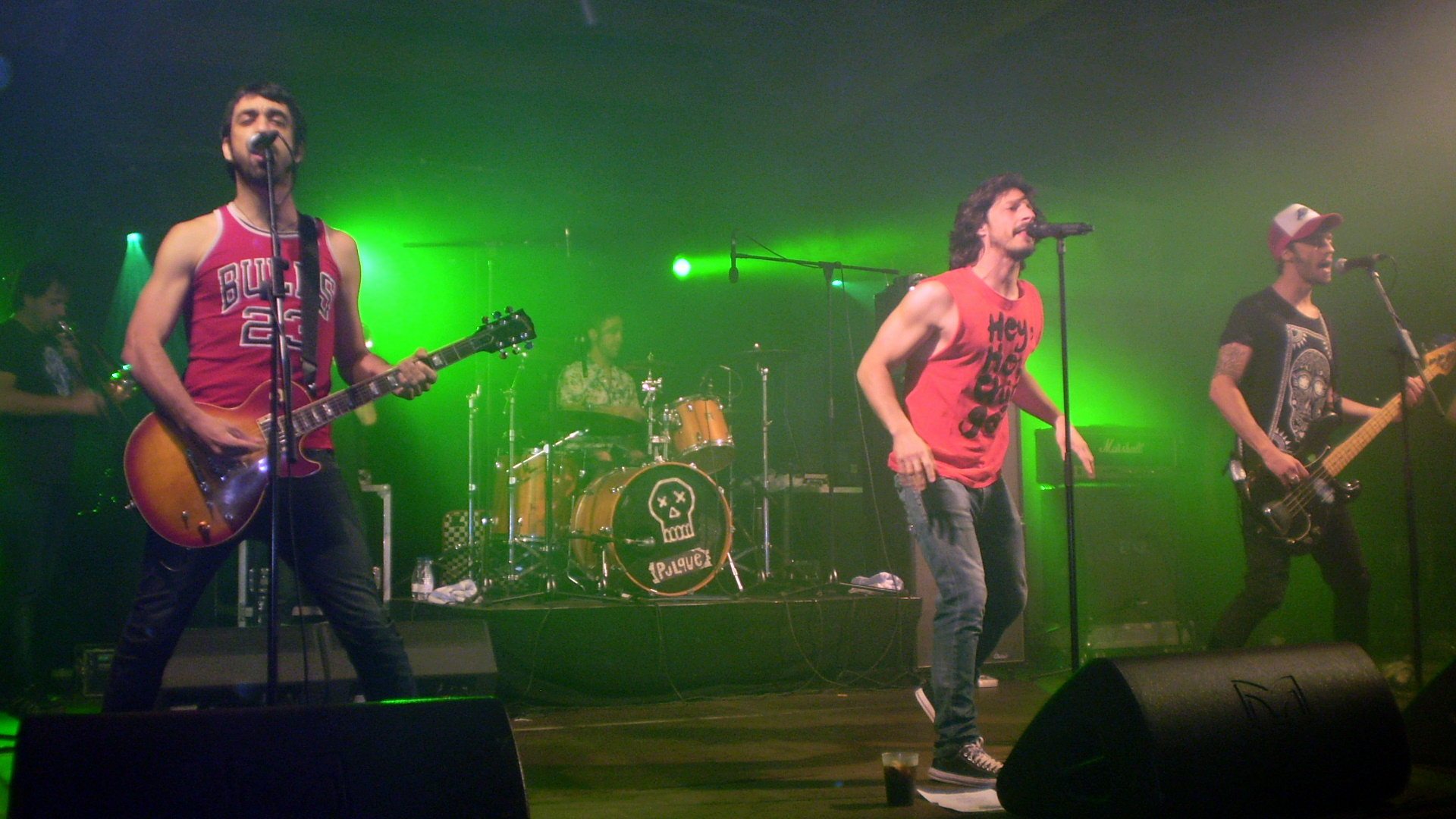
La Pulquería, musical group from Valencia, Spain, performing in Valladolid. 2011

La Pulquería is a Spanish punk rock band named for Pulque dispensaries. They represent a fusion of ska, punk rock, mariachi, and Mexican rock.

== Discography ==
- Corridos de amor (2004)
- C'mon fandango (2007)
- Hey Ho Chingón (Directo) (2008)
- Fast Cuisine, un menú de tres platos (2010)
  - Everybody Arroz Arse
  - Para To Take A Güey
  - Dulce De Leches
- Lobo de bar (2016)
