= Dhoad =

- Genres: Rajasthani folk music
- Instrument: Tabla
- Years active: 2002–present
- Members: Rahis Bharti

Dhoad, also known under the name Dhoad gypsies of Rajasthan, or Dhoad gypsies from Rajasthan is a group created in France in 2002 and directed by Rahis Bharti which brings together musicians from Rajasthan, India.

== History and training ==
The name Dhoad comes from the original village of Rahis Bharti. The group is made up of musicians, traditional dancers (the Ghoomar dance), fakirs, fire eaters, singers, players of traditional tabla, dholak, harmonium, kartel, bhapang, Indian Jew's harp), acrobats, poets and troubadours.

The training is signed by the Harmonia Mundi label.

=== Rahis Bharti ===
Rahis Bharti is an Indian musician and tabla player specializing in folk and classical styles. He is the descendant of over seven generations of royal court Rajasthani musicians, with multiple cultural influences. They initially played for the Maharajas from father to son. He has lived in France since the early 2000s. Founder, artistic director and musician of the Dhoad, Bollywood Massala Orchestra and Jaipur Maharaja Brass Band formations, he honors traditional Indian and Rajasthan music while experimenting with musical exchanges with other musical aesthetics. He became an ambassador and custodian of the culture of Rajasthan.

He's a foremost figure responsible for popularizing Rajasthani arts and music globally. He is a music producer, artistic director, educator, and founder of several ensembles.

Bharti has sponsored and promoted over 700 local Rajasthani dancers, musicians and artists from countless villages and towns in India and introduced them to the global stage. He has collaborated with scores of musicians from around the world, including Spanish Flamenco musicians, African Musicians, Corsican musicians and Pop stars in Europe and the USA.

Dedicated to the promotion of Rajasthani artists and musicians, Bharti founded the LIMDA Agency and FLR Production Company, France.

Bharti has performed over 2500 concerts in more than 110 countries around the world. He has conducted educational workshops and classes on Rajasthani music, arts and culture in schools, colleges and universities.

== Group journey ==
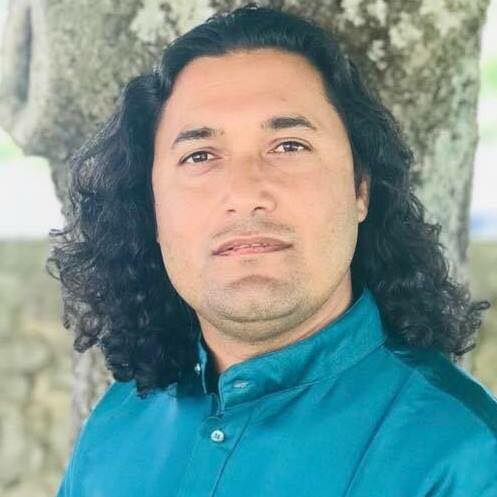

In 2000, as soon as he arrived in Corsica, Rahis Bhartiil wanted to make his traditional music known, and was already imagining the group Dhoad. He quickly brought in other Indian musicians. This is how he created the group Dhoad in 2002, to perform learned and traditional Rajasthani music. This variable geometry group includes musicians, dancers, fire-eaters, acrobats and fakir on stage. That is to say up to 18 artists on stage, that Rahis integrates, directs, produces and organizes the tours of the group.

Dhoad has performed over 1,500 concerts in over 110 countries. The group has performed at international events. They also played for the former President of the French Republic, François Hollande, before the President of India Abdul Kalam Azad, Narendra Modi Indian Prime Minister at the Carrousel du Louvre.

The group regularly shares the stage with other artists and performs with Hocine Boukella40, Esma Redzepova, Diego Carrasco, Romano Drom, Orchestra di Piazza Vittorio, Ssassa. They also shared the stage with Matthieu Chedid at the Élysée Montmartre and the singer LP during the Notte Della Taranta44 festival.

In 2007, the group took part in the show La route des fils du vent, bringing together music by gypsies from Central Europe, Spain (flamenco) and Rajasthan.

The group is based both in Tours, where Rahis Bharti resides, and also in Rajasthan, where most musicians reside.'

== Awards to Bharti ==
- 2015: Silicon Valley global organization community award in USA.
- 2016: Awards Include: The Fryderyk Award (Polish Grammy) Poland.
- 2018: Rajasthan Gouvrav (Pride of Rajasthan) Jaipur India
- 2019: CID Section of Japan, UNESCO award for Cultural Ambassador of Rajasthan Bestowed upon Rahis Bharti 21 February in Tokyo Japan.
- 15 August 2019: District Award by city of Jaipur on the Independence day of India.
- 26 January 2020: Rajasthan state award on Republic day of india By Rajasthan Governor.

== Discography ==
They released several albums, including:

=== Albums ===
- The Dhoad Gypsies from Rajasthan, label Dhoad Gypsies, 2005
- Roots travelers, World village France Harmonia mundi distribution, 2011
- Âfya, Sidi Bémol & Dhoad, gypsies from Rajasthan, CSB productions, 2014
- Times of Maharajas, ARC Music, 2019

=== Titles in a compilation ===
- Indian Vistas, ARC Music, 2018

== Notes ==
- This page is taken from all or part of the translation of the French wikipedia page on the subject
- Official website
