= Milune =

Swiss-American singer-songwriter

- Born: New York City, U.S.
- Origin: Switzerland
- Genres: Indie pop; alternative pop
- Occupation: Singer-songwriter
- Years active: 2022–present
- Label: Sony Music Switzerland

Milune is a Swiss-American singer-songwriter. Born in New York City and raised in Switzerland, she began releasing music in 2022. Her debut EP, rabbit holes, appeared in June 2024, followed by her debut studio album, Hearts Lust, in March 2025.

== Early life ==
Milune was born in New York City and moved to Switzerland with her family during childhood. She grew up near Zurich in a multilingual environment and took singing and ballet lessons before focusing on songwriting as a teenager.

== Career ==
In 2023, Milune was featured by SRF in its Female Music Special, which described her songs as addressing themes such as mental health, sexuality and self-discovery.

Her debut EP, rabbit holes, was released in June 2024.

Milune released her debut studio album, Hearts Lust, in March 2025. Swiss media described the album as exploring themes of desire, identity and relationships.

== Musical style ==
Milune's music has been described as indie pop and alternative pop.

== Discography ==
=== Studio albums ===
- Hearts Lust (2025)

=== Extended plays ===
- rabbit holes (2024)
