= Dhabi =

Dhabi ضابي
- Sub-district
- Location in Yemen
- Country: Yemen
- Governorate: Ibb Governorate
- District: Ba'dan District

Population (2004)
  - Total: 3,564
- Time zone: UTC+3

Dhabi (Arabic: ضابي) is a sub-district located in Ba'dan District, Ibb Governorate, Yemen. Dhabi has a population of 3564 as of 2004.
