= Debout sur le Zinc =

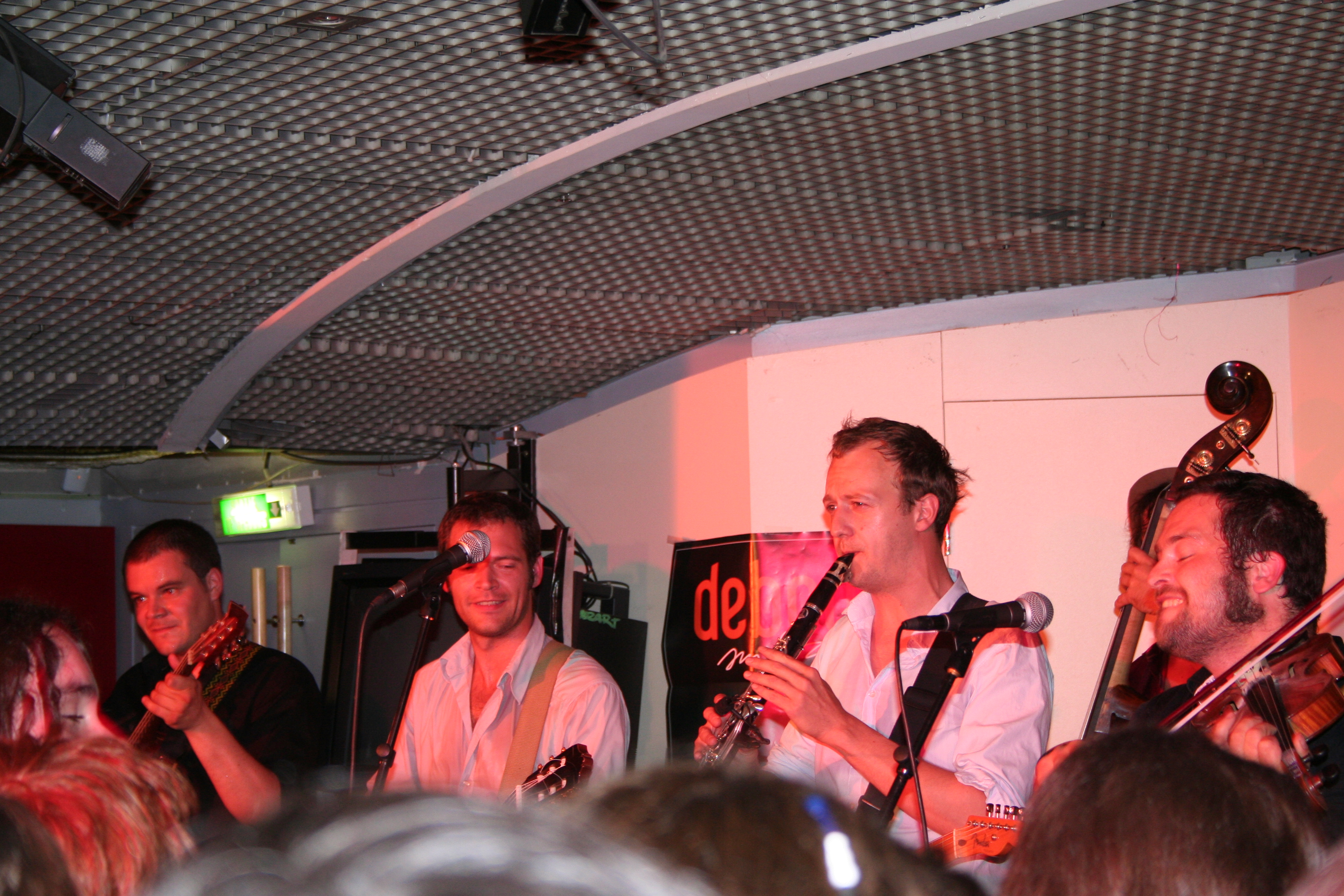

Background information
- Origin: France
- Genres: Nouvelle Chanson (French)
- Years active: 1995-present
- Members: Christophe Bastien; Cédric Ermolieff; William Thierry; Simon Mimoun; Romain Sassigneux; Olivier Sulpice; Fred Trisson
- Website: www.dslz.org

Debout Sur Le Zinc is a French music band.

After their first 1999 self-titled album, their subsequent album L’homme à tue-tête released in May 2001 gained them media acclaim and public popularity. By the time their 2004 album Des singes et les moutons enhanced their repertoire, they were selling out venues such as La Cigale and touring internationally. Songs from their latest album Les Promesses were featured in their first concert at the oldest music hall in Paris, the Olympia, where they played to a full house on May 16, 2006.

The band acknowledges influences from traditional French music and Irish music, rock, klezmer, and many styles that are considered dance hall music, such as gypsy jazz, tango, waltz.

== Background ==
Debout Sur Le Zinc members have described themselves as an Irish folk group synthesized with a rock band. Simon Mimoun and Olivier Sulpice met Christophe Bastien and Cédric “Momo” Ermolieff in high school. Simon met Fred Trisson at university, and Fred introduced the band to his childhood friend Romain Sassigneux. They began performing together in bars and on the street and with groups such as Garçons Bouchers and Les Ogres de Barback under the name Debout Sur Le Zinc as of 1996. William Lotvi joined as their bass player in 1998.

The idea for the name Debout Sur Le Zinc, literally “standing on the zinc,” originally came after a concert in which Christophe, guitarist/singer was standing on the bar counter playing the accordion. The discovery that the bar or zinc—the material bar countertops were once made of—used to serve as a stage for people to recite poems, sing or make political speeches, and the expression also being in a poem by Jacques Prévert further reinforced the name.

== Group members ==
- Cédric (Momo) Ermolieff: drums, percussion, xylophone, backup vocals
- Simon Mimoun: vocals, violin, trumpet
- Romain Sassigneux: clarinet, vocals, guitar
- Olivier Sulpice: banjo, mandola, backup vocals
- Fred Trisson/Triska: accordion
- Thomas Benoît: double bass, bass
- Chadi Chouman: guitars
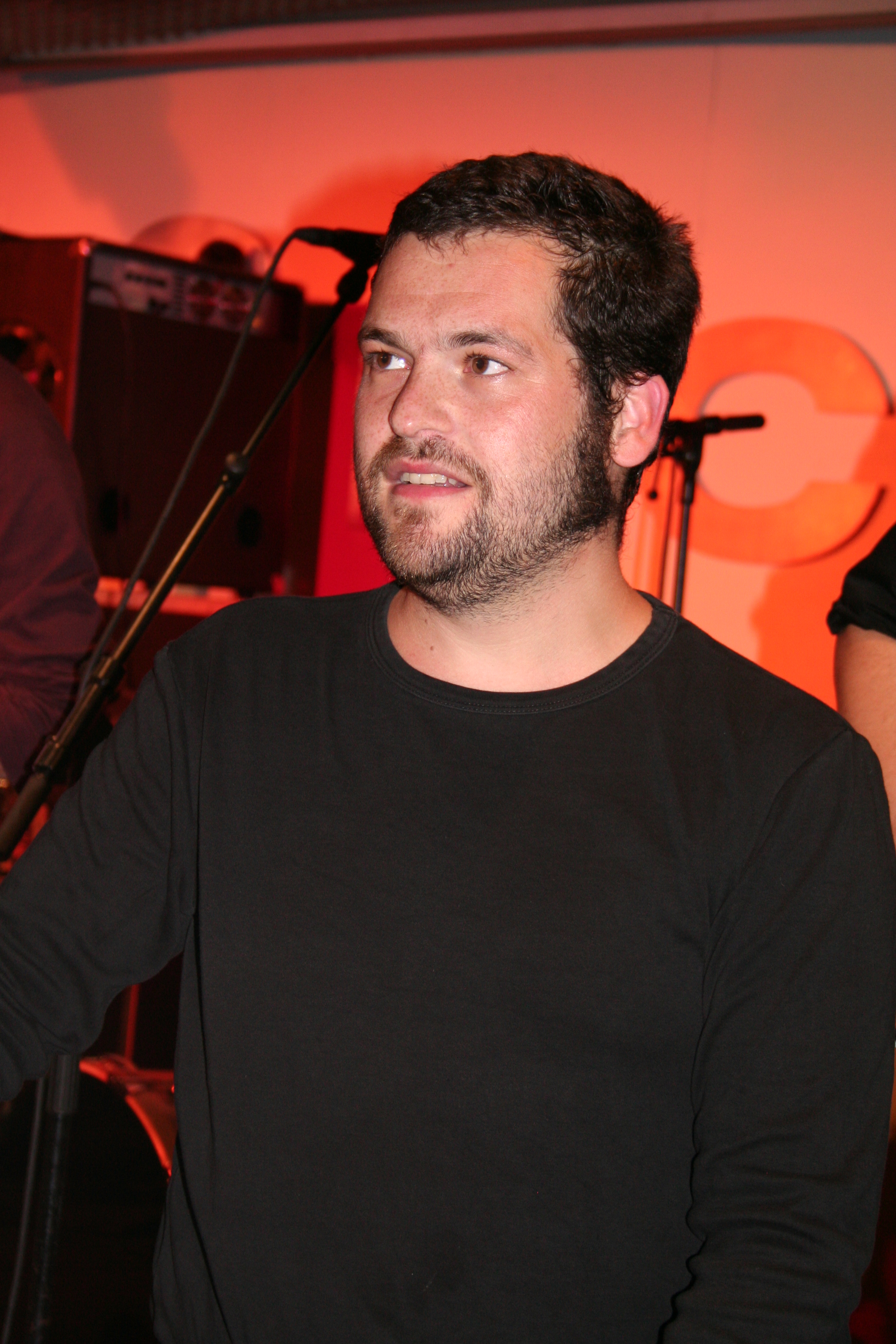
Simon Mimoun

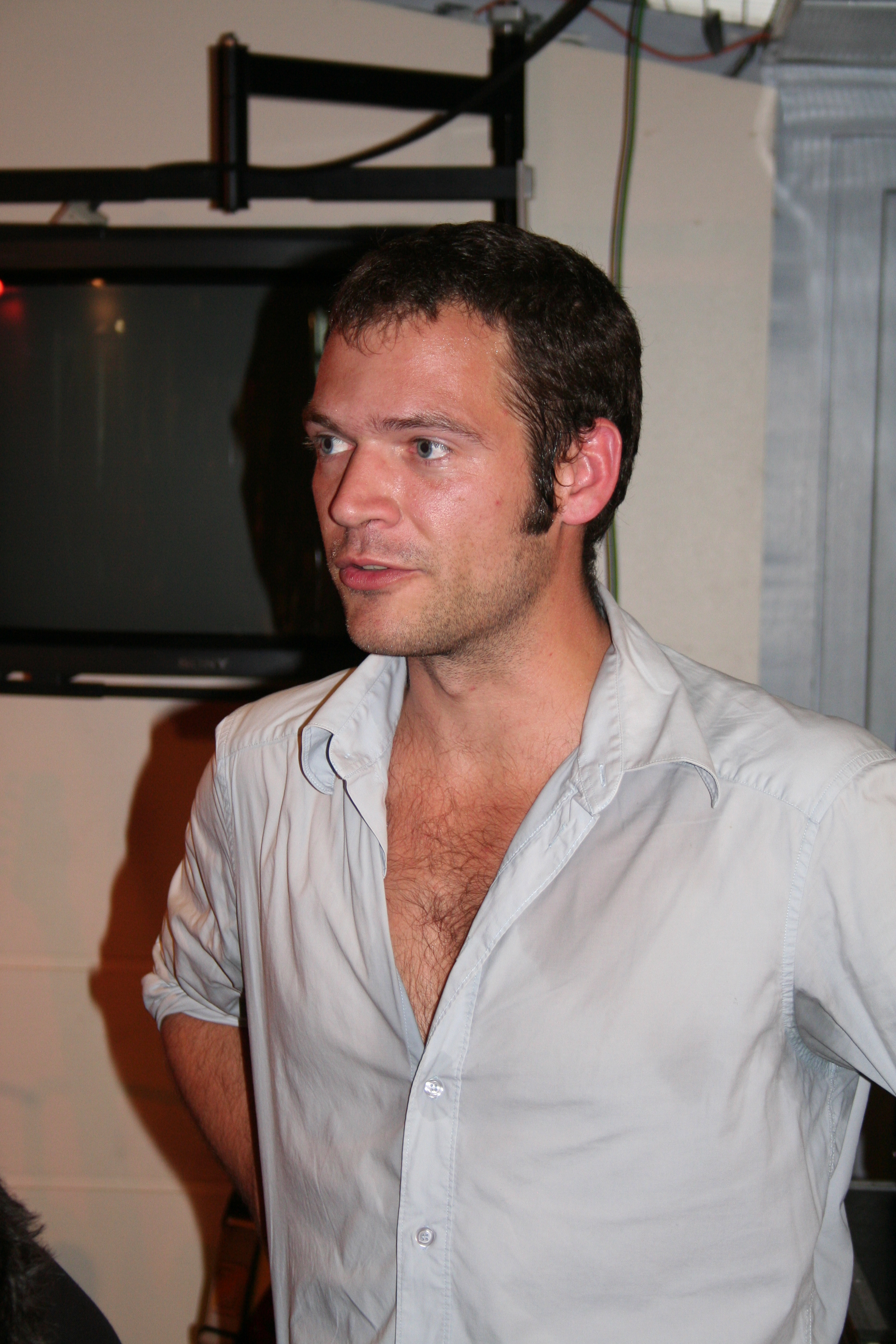
Christophe Bastien

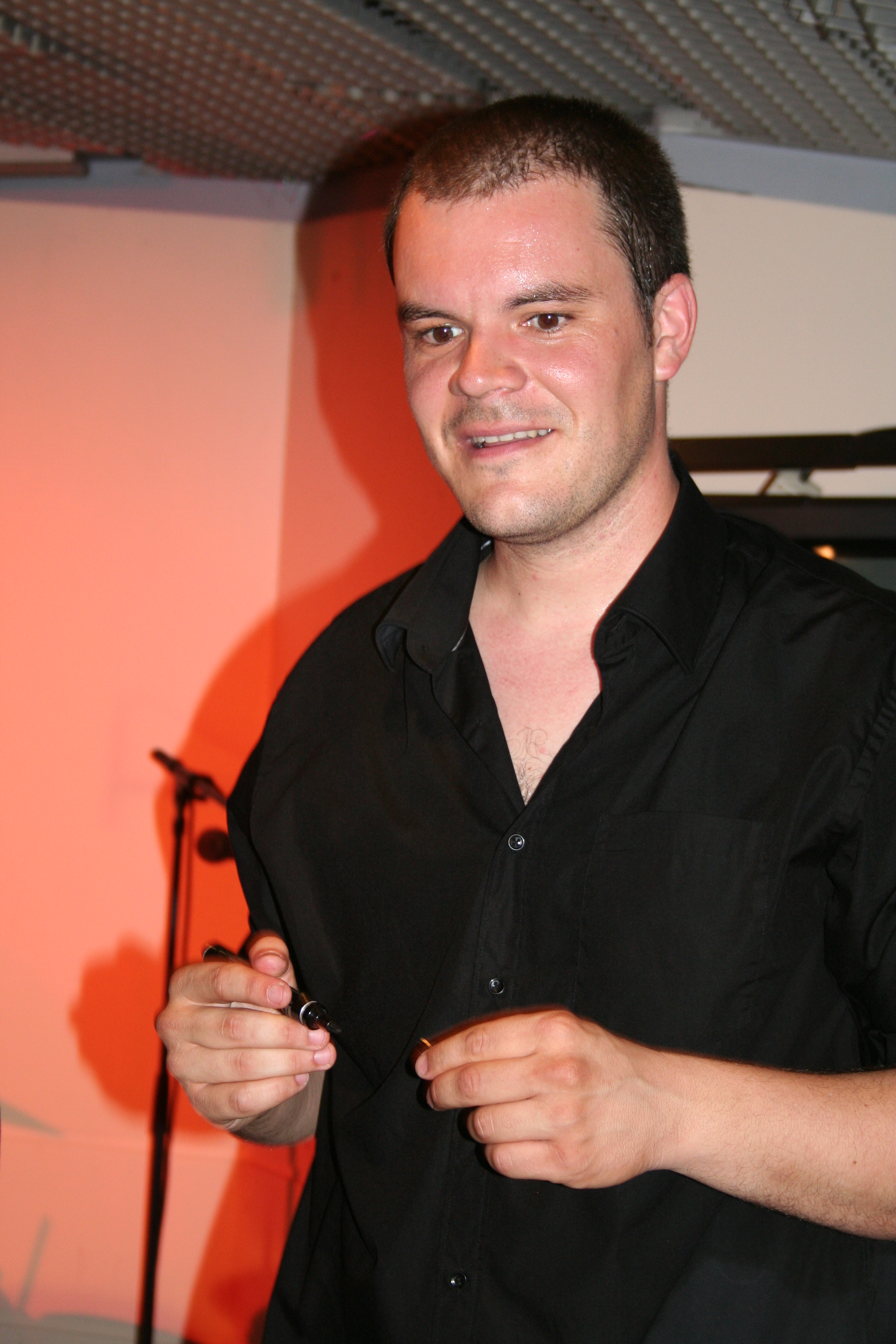
Olivier Sulpice

=== Previous group members ===
- Christophe Bastien: guitar, vocals (until 2014)
- William Lovti: double bass, bass (until 2014)
- Marie Lalonde: guitar, vocals, ukulele (until 2015)

== Discography ==
- Debout Sur Le Zinc : First Album (October 1999)
1. La Pantomime
2. La Valse Misère
3. Dialogue De Sourds
4. Emilie
5. Au Comptoir
6. L'abbé Chamel
7. Le Grand Chemin
8. Yvonne
9. ?
10. Ma Petite Chérie
11. L'ambition
12. La Jeunesse
- L'Homme à Tue-Tête : Second Album (May 2001)
1. Plein Comme Une Barrique
2. L'homme à Tue-tête
3. Les Manigances
4. Les Petites Envies De Meurtre
5. 2 X Oui - Intro
6. 2 X Oui
7. Le Roi Du Monde
8. Dans Le Métro
9. Désert
10. Slawek
11. Me Laissez Pas Seul
12. La Rengaine
13. Ton Petit Cirque
14. Un Jour De Moins
15. Où Est L'histoire
16. Les Sens Interdits
- Des Singes et Des Moutons : Third Album (May 2004)
1. Les Moutons
2. Le Bleu Du Miroir
3. Elle M'ennuie
4. Chut...
5. Elle
6. Les Mots D'amour
7. Comme Un Ange
8. Si L'idée Nous Enchante
9. Les Voisins
10. Les Angles
11. Marée Noire
12. Hop Là!
- Les Promesses : Fourth Album (April 2006)
1. Des Larmes Sur Ma Manche
2. Rester Debout
3. Un Jour Ou L'autre
4. Comme S'il En Pleuvait
5. Te Promettre La Lune
6. Les Tontons
7. Fallait Pas
8. La Déclaration
9. La Lettre Perdue
10. Mieux Que Rien
11. De Fil En Aiguilles
12. Un Défaut De Toi
13. Anita
14. La Pantomime 2
