= Les Ogres de Barback =

French musical group

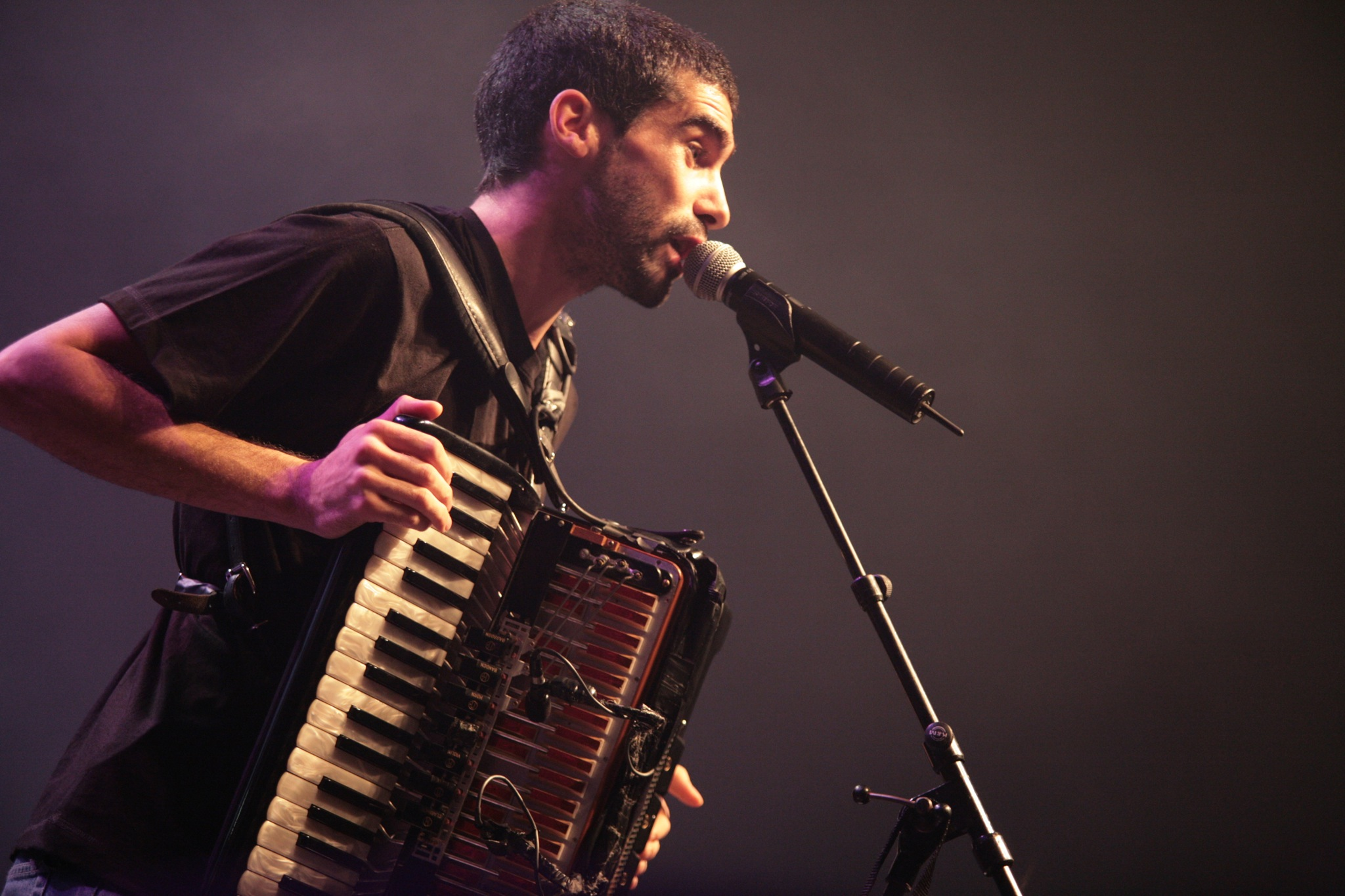
- Fred Burguière (2006)

Background information
- Also known as: Les Ogres
- Origin: France
- Genres: French music with various influences
- Years active: 1994-present
- Labels: Irfan
- Members: Fred Burguière; Sam Burguière; Alice Burguière; Mathilde Burguière
- Website: www.lesogres.com

Les Ogres de Barback (sometimes known just as Les Ogres) is a French musical group formed in 1994 by two brothers and two sisters: Fred, Sam, and the twins Alice and Mathilde Burguière. They all are multi-instrumentalists, have various influences and collaborated many times with other artists. They are known for the high quality of their work (both technically and lyricwise) as well as for the rich variety of instruments in their works.

== Members ==
All family (and band) members were born in Jouy-le-Moutier in the Val-d'Oise department of France. Their parents are of Armenian origin. The members are:

- Fred Burguière - Chromatic button accordion, diatonic button accordion, trombone, guitar, cornet, double bass, bass drum, main vocals
- Sam Burguière - violin, trumpet, guitar, flugelhorn, Epinette des Vosges, accordion
- Alice Burguière - cello, double bass, trombone, guitar, accordion, tuba, erhu, musical saw, violin, backing vocals
- Mathilde Burguière - piano, tuba, Western concert flute, clarinet, guitar, accordion, sousaphone, percussions, cello, backing vocals

== Discography ==
=== Albums ===
Year	Album	Peak positions	
Year	Album	FR	BEL (Wa)
1997	Rue du Temps		
1999	Irfan, le Héros		
2000	Fausses notes & Repris de Justesse		
2001	Croc'Noces		
2002	Un Air, Deux Familles		
2003	La pittoresque histoire de Pitt'ocha		
2004	Terrain vague	29	91
2006	Avril et vous	42	–
2007	Du simple au néant	17	70
2009	Pitt Ocha au Pays des Mille Collines	32	–
2011	Comment je suis devenu voyageur	16	38
2012	La fabrique à chansons	91	114
2013	Pitt Ocha et la tisane de couleurs	47	172
2014	Vous m'emmerdez!	17	143
2019	Amours grises & colères rouges	22	163

Live albums

Year	Album	Peak positions
Year	Album	FR
1997	Concert: Les Ogres de Barback et la Fanfare du Belgistan	52

Compilation albums

Year	Album	Peak positions
Year	Album	FR
2015	20 ans!	44

=== Singles ===
Year	Title	Peak positions	Album
Year	Title	FR	Album
2014	"Ohm"	167	Vous m'emmerdez!

=== Collaborations ===
- 1998: K2R Riddim - Carnet de Roots
- 2001: K2R Riddim - Decaphonik
- 2001: Debout sur le Zinc - L'Hômme à tue-tête
- 2001: Les Hurlements d'Léo - La belle affaire
- 2002: Pierre Perret - Cui là
- 2003: Les Hurlements d'Léo - Ouest Terne
- 2005: Tryo - Tryo au Cabaret Sauvage
- 2006: L'Air de rien - Luttopie
- 2007: Jules - Les années douces
- 2008: Les Barbeaux - Les Saints Ecrits
- 2008: Aldebert - Enfantillages
- 2009: Syrano - Le Gout du Sans
- 2010: L'Air de rien - La route du rom
- 2010: La Mine de Rien - La tête allant vers
- 2012: La Mine de Rien - Live
- 2014: Txarango - Som un riu
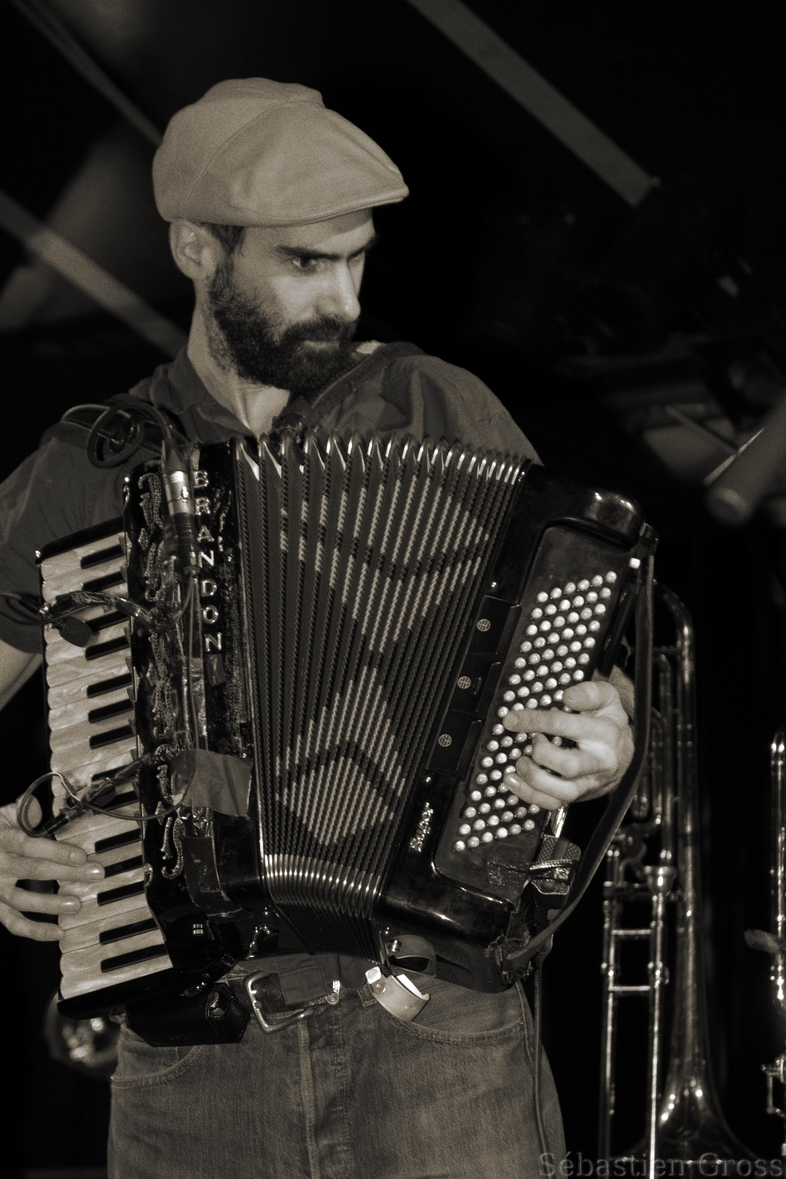
Fredo

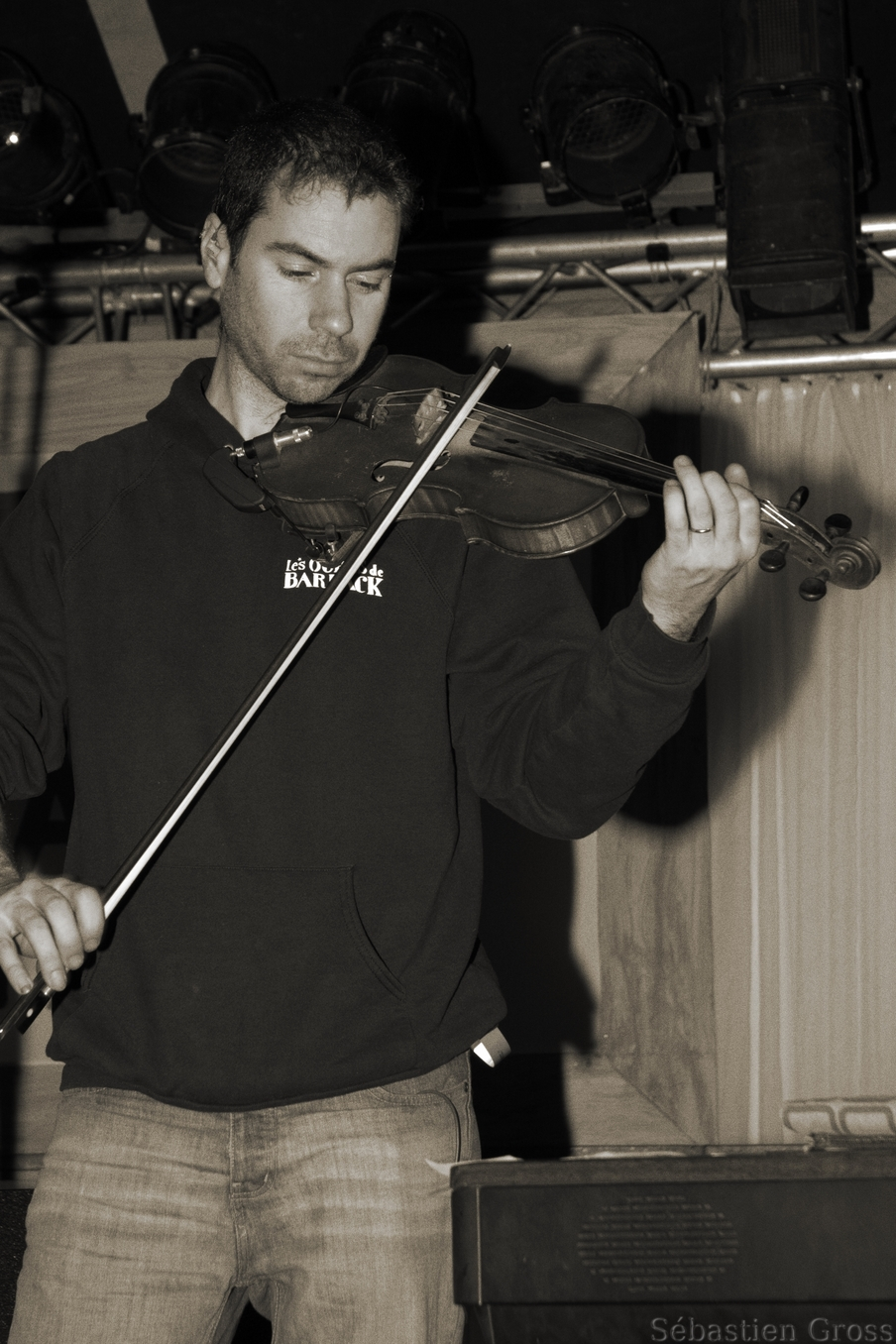
Sam

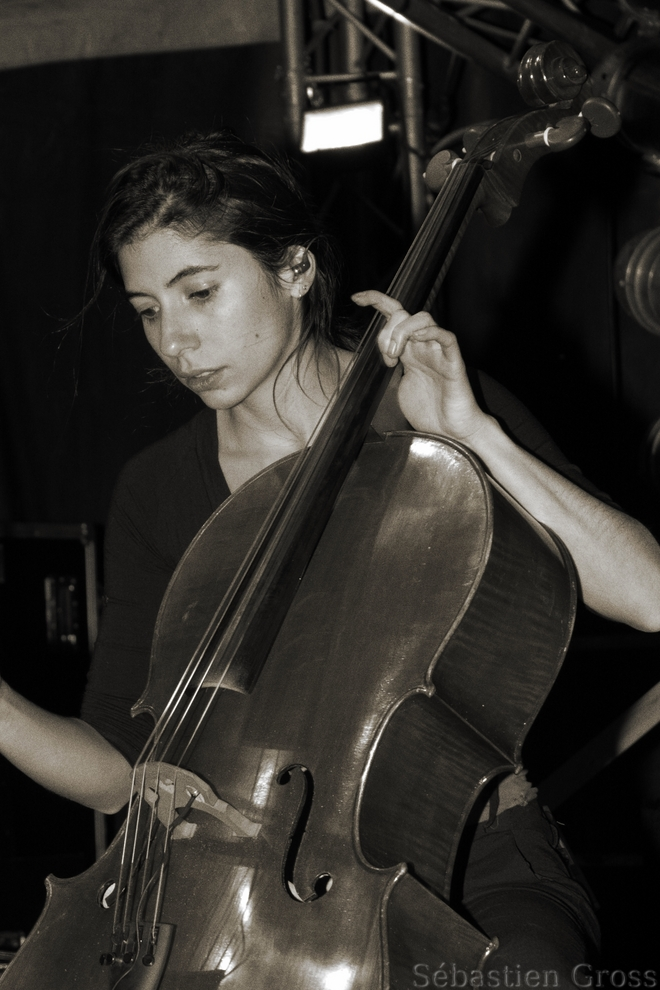
Alice

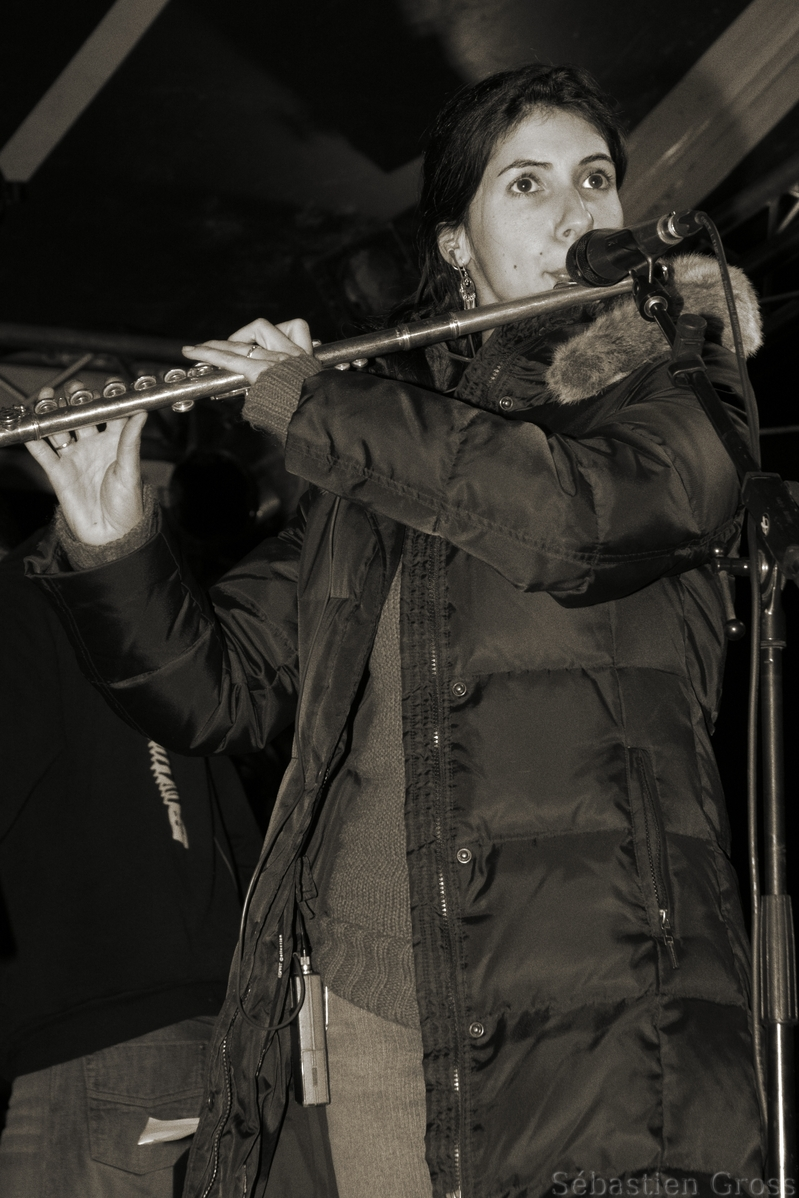
Mathilde
