= La Chanson du Dimanche =

French musical group

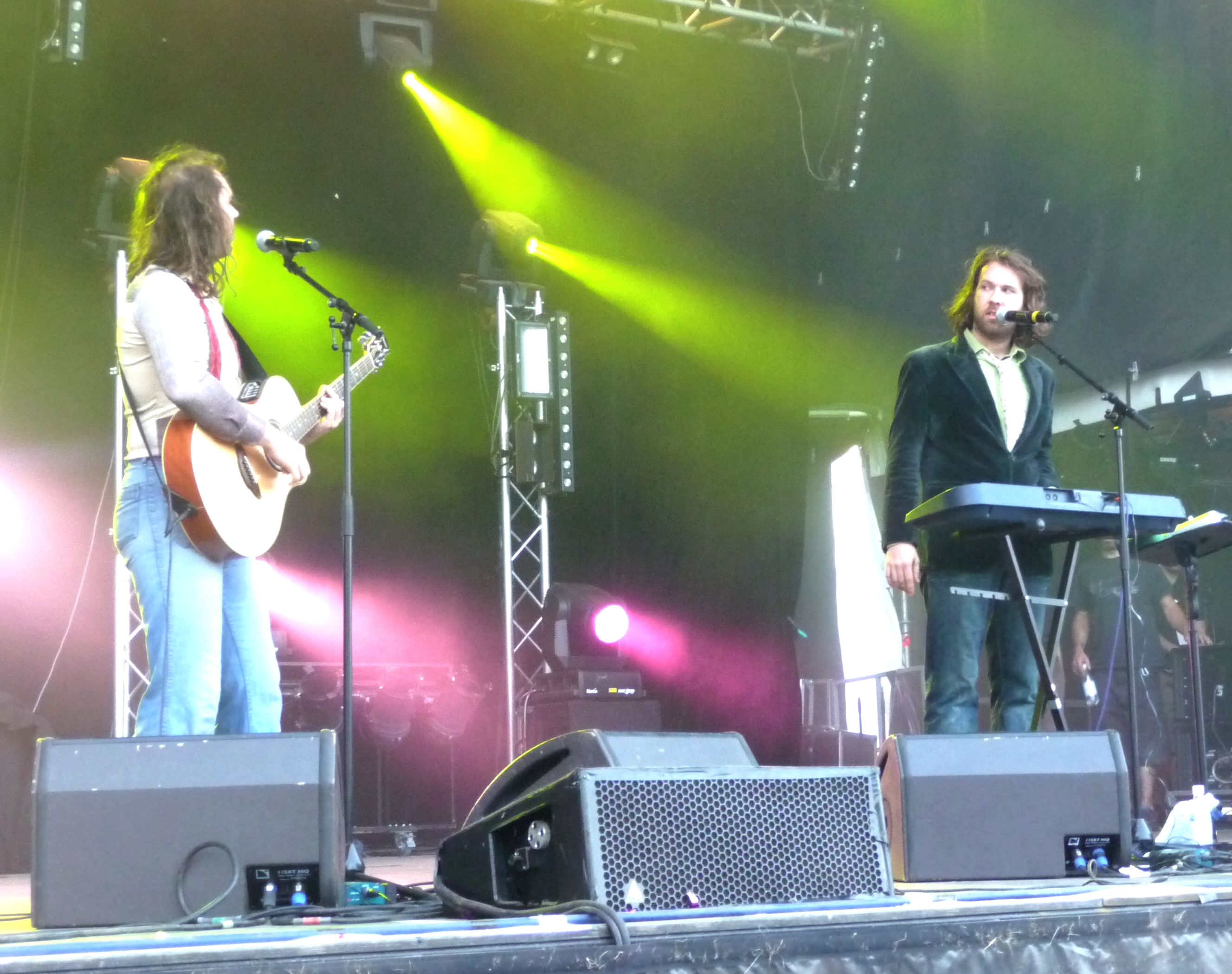
- La Chanson du Dimanche in a live concert on 28 June 2009 at festival "Décibulles", in Neuve-Église (France)

Background information
- Origin: Paris, France
- Genre: chanson
- Years active: 2007 – 2012
- Labels: Remark Records & La pêche production
- Members: Clément Marchand (guitar & vocals); Alexandre Castagnetti "Alec" (keyboard & vocals)
- Website: www.lachansondudimanche.com

La Chanson du Dimanche is a French musical group founded in 2007. In the tradition of the French chansonniers, their concept is to broadcast a new song every Sunday.

Formed by Clément Marchand (guitar & vocals) and Alexandre Castagnetti "Alec" (keyboard & vocals), their songs use many different musical styles (zouk, disco, folk, chanson) and deal with daily themes, politics, ecology, people, to name a few. They usually inspire a lot of positive energy and good mood ("bonne humeur" was their very first song).

Initially a mere funny experiment, they became quite popular in France through the video-sharing and social networks web sites, and particularly through their song "Petit cheminot" during a strike in December 2007.

== Discography ==
- 2008 DVD "La Chanson du Dimanche" (seasons 1 and 2), La pêche production
- 2009 "Plante un arbre", Remark Records
- 2010 DVD "La Chanson du Dimanche" (seasons 3 and 4), La pêche production
