= Trio =

Trio may refer to:

== Music ==
=== Groups ===
- Trio (music), an ensemble of three performers, or a composition for such an ensemble
  - Jazz trio, pianist, double bassist, drummer
  - Minuet and trio, a form in classical music
  - String trio, a group of three string instruments
  - Power trio, guitar, bass, and drums
  - Piano trio, a trio including a piano
  - Organ trio, a trio including a Hammond organ
- Trio (band), a German group formed in 1979
- The supergroup of Dolly Parton, Emmylou Harris and Linda Ronstadt (unofficially known as Trio due to their album of the same title).

=== Works ===
- Trio (1987 album) and Trio II (1999 album) by Dolly Parton, Emmylou Harris, and Linda Ronstadt
- Trio (Marcin Wasilewski album)
- Trio (Trio album) by German group Trio
- The Trio (Hank Jones album)
- The Trio (Oscar Peterson album)
- The Trio (1973 album), by Oscar Peterson, Joe Pass and Niels-Henning Pedersen
- The Trio (Ted Curson album)
- Trios (Rob Wasserman album), 1994
- Trios (Carla Bley album), 2013
- "Trio", a song by King Crimson on the album Starless and Bible Black
- Trios, Op. 1 (Stamitz), a set of six orchestral pieces
- Trio (Steve Berry album) by the Steve Berry Trio

=== Musical component ===
- Trio (musical form), the secondary section of a work in ternary form, e.g. a minuet, scherzo or march

== Film and television ==
- Trio (TV network)
- Trio (1950 film), an anthology film
- Trio (1997 film), a South Korean film directed by Park Chan-wook
- Trio (TV series), a South Korean drama
- "Trio" (Buffy the Vampire Slayer), a group of three fictional villains
- "Trio" (Glee)
- "Trio" (Stargate Atlantis)

== Food and drinks ==
- Trio (chocolate bar), in the UK
- Trio (fast food dish), or 3-in-1, fast food dish with Irish origins consisting of chips, rice and curry sauce

== Technology ==
- S3 Trio, a range of graphics chipsets 3D Graphics Accelerator
- Trio Corporation, a Japanese audio product manufacturer
- Magnetom Trio, an MRI produced by Siemens
- Softonic.com's TRIO Office Suite software

== Places ==
- Trio, South Carolina
- Trio, Belize, a village in Toledo District, Belize
- Trio Beach, a gazetted beach in Pak Sha Wan Peninsula, Sai Kung District, Hong Kong

== Organisations ==
- The Trio, a colloquial name for three German metal trading companies, Metallgesellschaft AG, Beer, Sondheimer & Co. and Aron Hirsch & Sohn

== Other uses ==
- Trio (1801 ship)
- Trio (trimaran), a sailboat designed by Lock Crowther in 1962
- Trio (Conner), a 2013 sculpture by Elizabeth Conner in Portland, Oregon
- Trio (Sugarman), a 1972 sculpture by George Sugarman in Milwaukee, Wisconsin
- TRIO (gene)
- TRIO (program), a group of student services and outreach programs
- Trio language
- Trio people, a South American ethnic group
- Trio World School
- Trio, a book by Dorothy Baker
- Trio (novel), a novel by William Boyd

== See also ==
- 3 (disambiguation)
- Tri (disambiguation)
- Triad (disambiguation)
- Triarchy (disambiguation)
- Trilogy (disambiguation)
- Trinity (disambiguation)
- Triple (disambiguation)
- Triptych (disambiguation)
- Triumvirate
- Troika (disambiguation)
- Tryo
- Tirio (disambiguation)
- Three Musicians (disambiguation)
