= Tiriyo =

Tiriyo, Tiriyó, or Trió may refer to:

- Tiriyó people, an ethnic group of Brazil and Suriname
- Tiriyó language, their language

== See also ==
- Missão Tiriyó, a village
- Tirio (disambiguation)
- Trio (disambiguation)
