= Elegiac =

Poetic concept

The adjective elegiac has two possible meanings. First, it can refer to something of, relating to, or involving, an elegy or something that expresses similar mournfulness or sorrow. Second, it can refer more specifically to poetry composed in the form of elegiac couplets.

An elegiac couplet consists of one line of poetry in dactylic hexameter followed by a line in dactylic pentameter. Because dactylic hexameter is used throughout epic poetry, and because the elegiac form was always considered "lower style" than epic, elegists, or poets who wrote elegies, frequently wrote with epic poetry in mind and positioned themselves in relation to epic.

== Classical poets ==
The first examples of elegiac poetry in writing come from classical Greece. The form dates back nearly as early as epic, with such authors as Archilochus and Simonides of Ceos from early in the history of Greece. The first great elegiac poet of the Hellenistic period was Philitas of Cos: Augustan poets identified his name with great elegiac writing. One of the most influential elegiac writers was Philitas' rival Callimachus, who had an enormous impact on Roman poets, both elegists and non-elegists alike. He promulgated the idea that elegy, shorter and more compact than epic, could be even more beautiful and worthy of appreciation. Propertius linked him to his rival with the following well-known couplet:

Callimachi Manes et Coi sacra Philetae,
in vestrum, quaeso, me sinite ire nemus.

Translation:

Callimachus' spirit, and shrine of Philitas of Cos,
let me enter your sacred grove, I beseech you.

The 1st-century-AD rhetorician Quintilian ranked Philitas second only to Callimachus among the elegiac poets.

Another Greek elegiac poet, the subject of an elegy by Callimachus, was Heraclitus of Halicarnassus. Hermesianax was also an elegiac poet.

The foremost elegiac writers of the Roman era were Catullus, Propertius, Tibullus, and Ovid. Catullus, a generation earlier than the other three, influenced his younger counterparts greatly. They all, particularly Propertius, drew influence from Callimachus, and they also clearly read each other and responded to each other's works. Notably, Catullus and Ovid wrote in non-elegiac meters as well, but Propertius and Tibullus did not.

== English poets ==
The "elegy" was originally a classical form with few English examples. However, in 1751, Thomas Gray wrote "Elegy Written in a Country Churchyard". That poem inspired numerous imitators, and soon both the revived Pindaric ode and "elegy" were commonplace. Gray used the term elegy for a poem of solitude and mourning, and not just for funereal (eulogy) verse. He also freed the elegy from the classical elegiac meter.

Afterward, Samuel Taylor Coleridge argued that the elegiac is the form "most natural to the reflective mind" and that it may be upon any subject, so long as it reflects on the poet himself. Coleridge was quite aware that his definition conflated the elegiac with the lyric, but he was emphasizing the recollected and reflective nature of the lyric he favored and referring to the sort of elegy that had been popularized by Gray. Also, Charlotte Smith used the term to describe her series of Elegiac Sonnets. Similarly, William Wordsworth had said that poetry should come from "emotions recollected in tranquility" (Preface to Lyrical Ballads, emphasis added). After the Romantics, "elegiac" slowly returned to its narrower meaning of verse composed in memory of the dead.

In other examples of poetry such as Alfred Tennyson's "The Lady of Shalott", an elegiac tone can be used, where the author is praising someone in a sombre tone. J. R. R. Tolkien in his essay "Beowulf: The Monsters and the Critics" argues that Beowulf is a heroic elegy.

== Music ==
Musical composition and albums have used the adjective for titles, often of elegies in music, including:

- "Elegischer Gesang" ("Elegiac Song"), for string quartet and four mixed voices by Ludwig van Beethoven (1814)
- Two Elegiac Melodies for string orchestra by Edvard Grieg (1880)
- Elegiac Ode by Charles Villiers Stanford (1884)
- Elegiac Symphony, Second Symphony by Donald Keats (1964)
- Trio élégiaque No. 1, a piano trio by Sergei Rachmaninoff (1892)
- Tríptico elegíaco para un percusionista by Salvador Chuliá (1990)
- Elegiac Cycle, 1999 album for solo piano by Brad Mehldau

== See also ==
- Elegy
- Elegiac couplet
- Poetry
