= Tri-Valley (disambiguation) =

TriValleys or Tri-Valley may refer to:

== Places ==
- Tri-Valley, East Bay, Bay Area, San Francisco Bay, California, USA
- Tri-Valley Council, Mid-Iowa, Iowa, USA; a Boy Scout region

== Schools ==
- Tri-Valley School District, Schuylkill County, Pennsylvania, USA
- Tri-Valley Local School District, Muskingum County, Ohio, USA
- Tri-Valley Central School, Grahamsville, New York State, USA
- Tri-Valley University, Pleasanton, California, USA
- Tri-Valley High School (disambiguation)

== Sports ==
- Tri-Valley Conference (disambiguation)
- Tri-Valley League (disambiguation)

== Other uses ==
- Tri-Valley Community Television, Tri-Valley, California, USA

== See also ==
- Three Valleys (disambiguation)
- Valley (disambiguation)
- TRI (disambiguation)
