= Michelin Man =

Mascot of the Michelin tyre company

- First appearance: 1894
- Created by: O'Galop

In-universe information
- Gender: Male

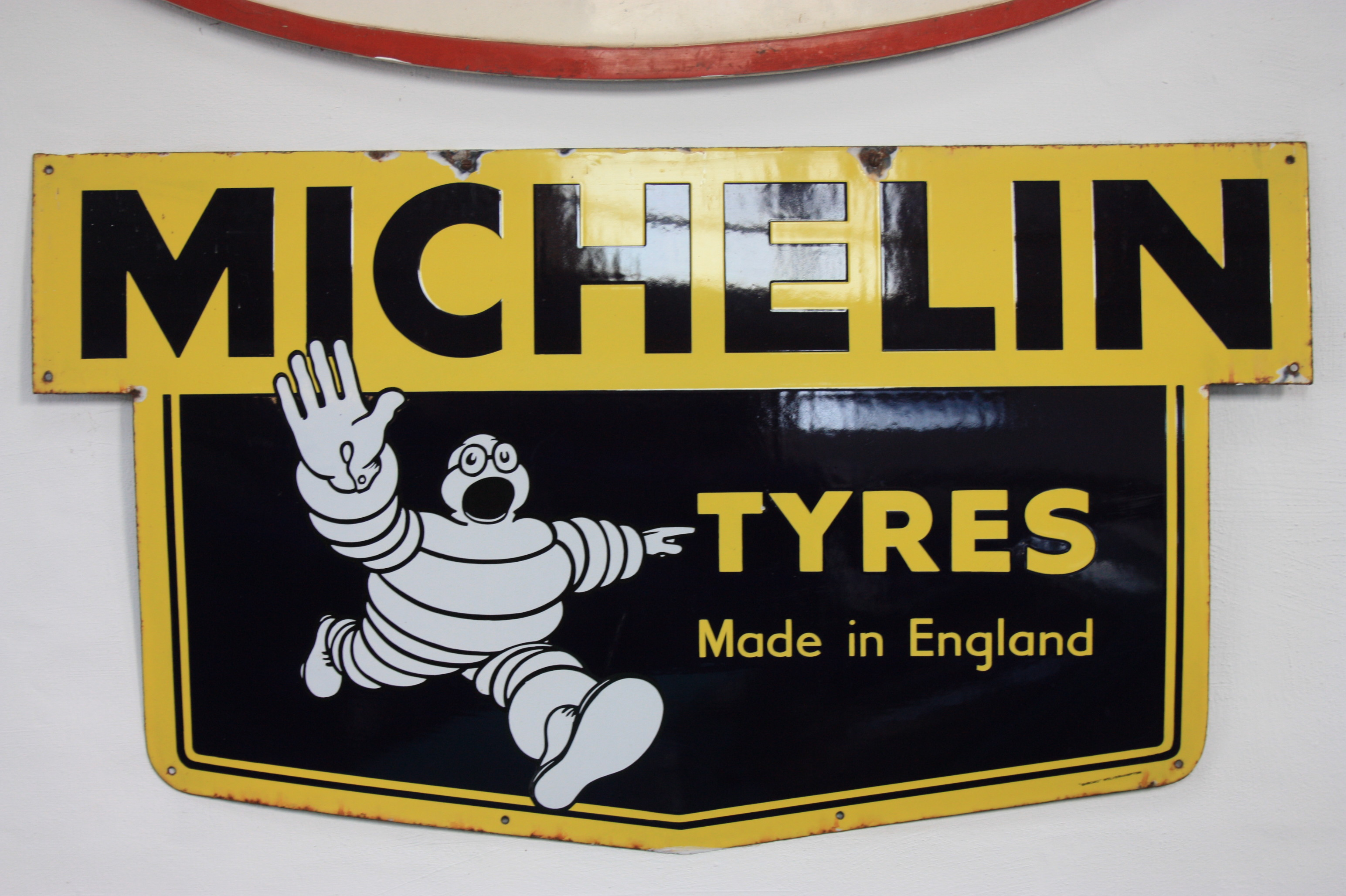
Sign for Michelin tyres featuring Bibendum

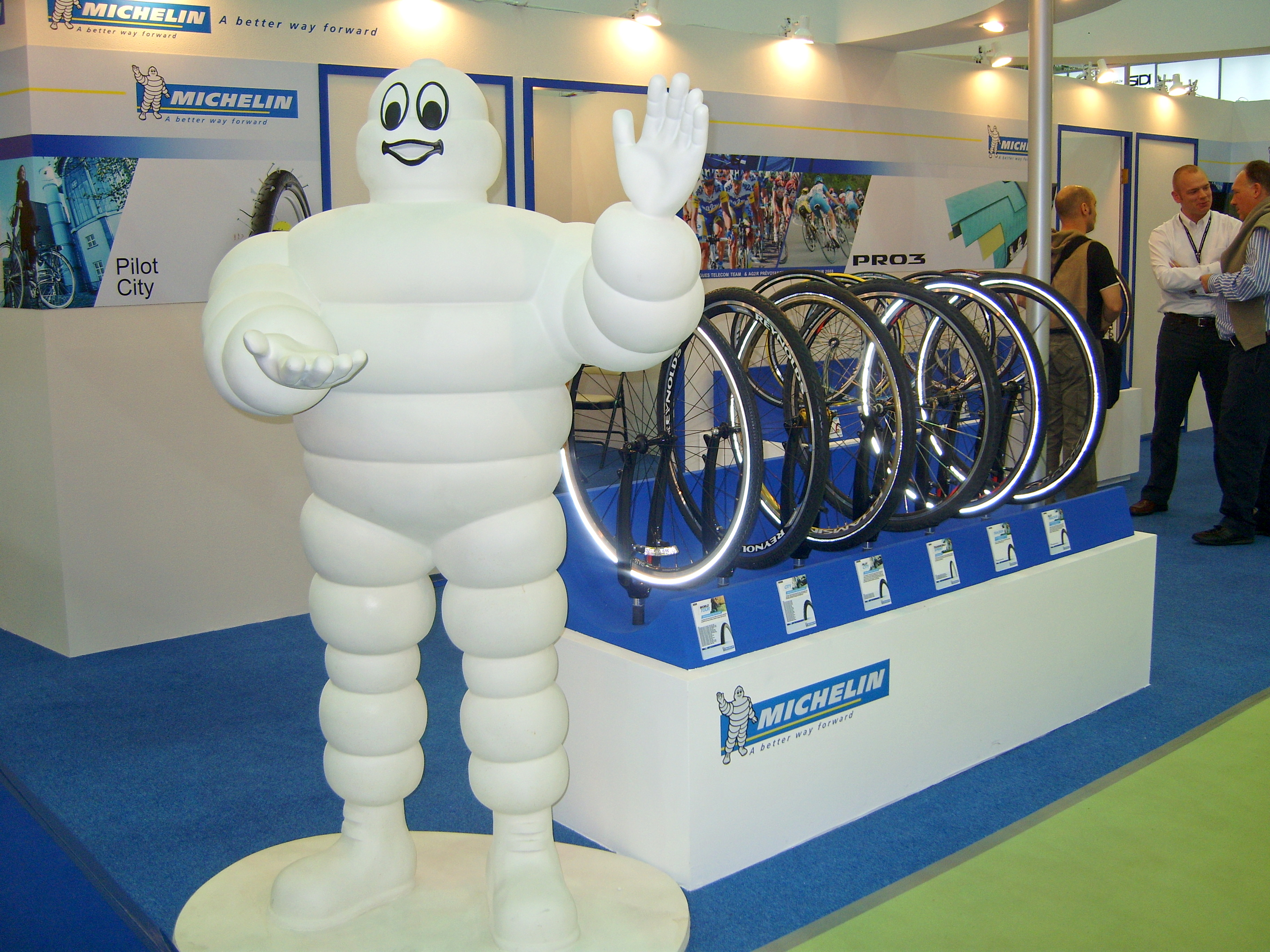
Bibendum in Taipei, 2008

Bibendum (French pronunciation: [bibɛ̃dɔm]), commonly referred to in English as the Michelin Man or Michelin Tire Man, is the official mascot of the Michelin tire company. A humanoid figure consisting of stacked white tires, it was introduced at the Lyon Exhibition of 1894 where the Michelin brothers had a stand. He is one of the world's oldest trademarks still in active use. The slogan Nunc est bibendum ("Now is the time to drink") is taken from Horace's Odes (book I, ode xxxvii, line 1). He is also referred to as Bib or Bibelobis.

Michelin dominated the French tire industry for decades and remains a leading international tire manufacturer. Its famous guidebooks are widely used by travelers. Bibendum was depicted visually as a lord of industry, a master of all he surveyed, and a patriotic exponent of the French spirit. In the 1920s, Bibendum urged Frenchmen to adopt America's superior factory system, but to patriotically excel those factories' "inferior" products. As automobiles became available to the middle classes, the company's advertising followed suit, and its restaurant and hotel guides expanded to a broader range of price categories.

== Development ==
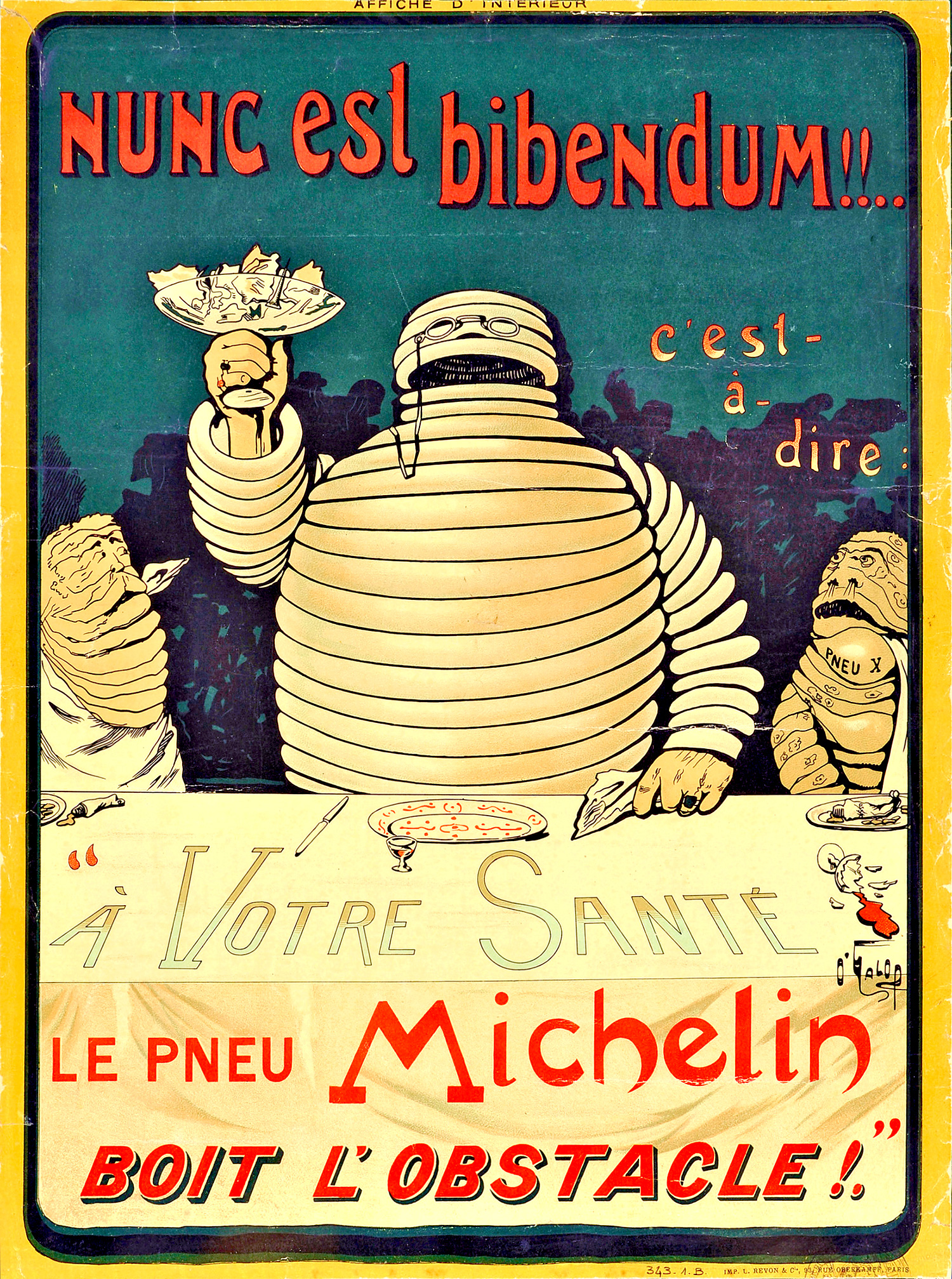
The original poster by "O'Galop" of Bibendum, the Michelin Man, produced in 1898. The text reads, "Now is the time to drink!! Which is to say: 'To your health, the Michelin tire drinks down the obstacle[s]!'"

While attending the Universal and Colonial Exposition in Lyon in 1894, Édouard and André Michelin noticed a stack of tires that suggested to Édouard the figure of a man without arms. Four years later, André met French cartoonist Marius Rossillon, popularly known as O'Galop, who showed him a rejected image he had created for a Munich brewery: a large, regal figure holding a huge glass of beer and quoting Horace's phrase Nunc est bibendum ("Now is the time for drinking"). André immediately suggested replacing the man with a figure made from tires, and O'Galop adapted the earlier image into Michelin's symbol. Today, Bibendum is one of the world's most recognized trademarks, representing Michelin in over 170 countries. According to Michelin, a study showed that 90% of the world’s population could instantly recognize him.

The 1898 poster showed him offering the toast Nunc est bibendum to his scrawny Brand X competitors with a glass full of road hazards, with the title and tag C'est à dire : À votre santé. Le pneu Michelin boit l'obstacle ("That is to say: To your health. The Michelin tire absorbs (literally "drinks") the obstacle"; see illustration). The character's glass is filled with nails and broken glass, implying that Michelin tires will easily take on road hazards.

The company used this basic poster format for 15 years, adding its latest products to the table in front of the figure. It is unclear when the name "Bibendum" was adopted. At the latest, it was in 1908, when Michelin commissioned Curnonsky to write a newspaper column signed "Bibendum". In 1922, Michelin held a contest to name the character in the United States. The winning entry was "Old 1895", chosen for the year Michelin had introduced the world’s first pneumatic automobile tire, though judges noted that no submission fully met their approval and considered the search for a definitive name still unresolved.

Rubber tires were originally gray-white, or light or translucent beige. In 1912, they became black when carbon was added to them as a preservative and strengthener. The company changed Bibendum's colour to black as well, and featured him that way in several print ads. They decided to abandon the change, citing printing and aesthetic issues (not racial concerns, as is commonly believed).

The image of the plump tire-man is sometimes used to describe an obese person, or someone wearing comically bulky clothing (e.g. "How can I wrap up warm without looking like the Michelin Man?").

Bibendum's shape has changed over the years. O'Galop's logo was based on bicycle tires, wore pince-nez glasses with lanyard, and smoked a cigar. By the 1960s, Bibendum was shown running, often rolling a tire as well, and no longer smoked. In 1998, his 100th anniversary, a slimmed-down version of him (sans glasses) was adopted, reflecting the lower-profile, smaller tires of modern cars. An animated version of Bibendum has appeared in American television ads, with a pet puppy similar in appearance to him.

A history of Bibendum, Le Grand Siècle de Bibendum (Hoëbeke, Paris, 1997), was written by Olivier Darmon.

== In popular culture ==
Bibendum is one of several advertising characters featured in this advertisement from 1920

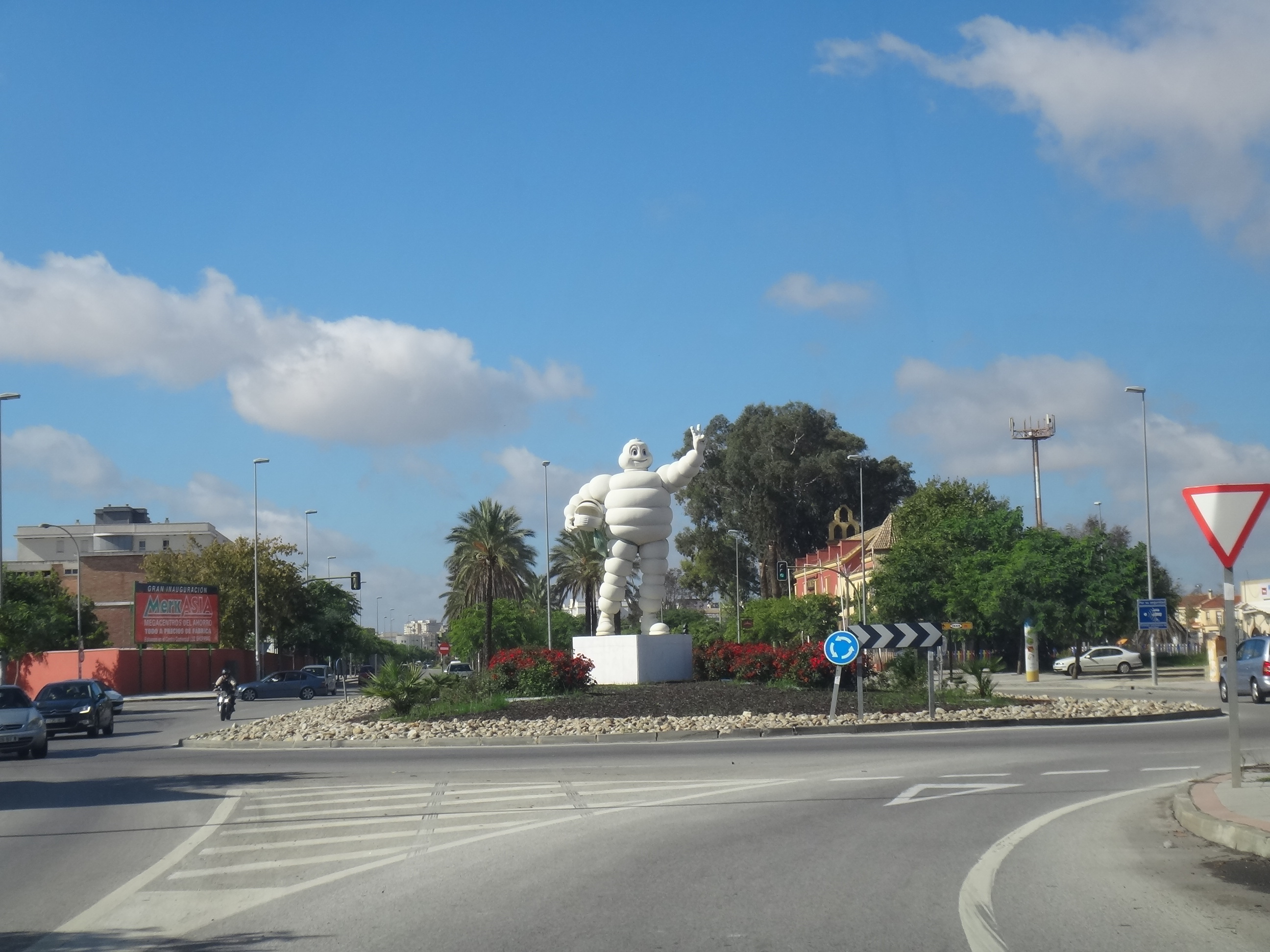
Monument in Jerez de la Frontera.

The "Bibendum chair" was designed by Eileen Gray in 1925.

Cayce Pollard, the main character of William Gibson's novel Pattern Recognition, has a strong aversion to corporate brands and logos. The sight of Bibendum in particular gives her panic attacks.

Bibendum made a brief guest appearance in the Asterix series, as the chariot-wheel dealer in certain translations, including the English one, of Asterix in Switzerland. (The original French version used the Gaulish warrior mascot of French service-station company Antar.)

The mascot appears in a BBC Not the Nine O'Clock News comedy sketch, in which a restaurant waiter and chef suspect a diner, dressed as Bibendum, might be a food critic for the Michelin Guide.

Michelin sued the performance artist Momus in 1991 for releasing a song about the trademarked Michelin Man. The song, simply titled "Michelin Man", was released the same year as the third track on his album Hippopotamomus (which also had a hippopotamus-headed version of the Michelin Man on its cover) used the mascot as a metaphor for hypersexual rubber fetishism. The use of the Michelin Man in such explicit lyrics were not authorized by the Michelin company, and Momus was sued by the company for depicting their mascot in scenarios of a pornographic nature. As a result, all remaining copies of the album were destroyed, the song was removed from subsequent pressings of the album, and the hippo Michelin Man removed from the cover. The 2018 box set Recreate (containing some of Momus' albums, including the Hippopotamomus album that caused the lawsuit over his song) restored the track to the album, and came with a booklet by Anthony Reynolds titled 'Sons of Pioneers', mentioning the lawsuit but not explaining why the track was reinstated.

French reggae band Tryo sang about Bibendum on their album Grain de Sable. 'Monsieur Bibendum, il est vraiment énorme / Monsieur Bibendum, le bonheur en personne' ('Mr. Bibendum, he is truly enormous, Mr. Bibendum; happiness personified').

In the 2009 animated, Academy Award-winning satire Logorama, a series of Bibendums play police detectives, a sheriff, and a squad of SWAT personnel who all work together to try to bring down a psychotic, ultraviolent criminal depicted as Ronald McDonald.

In the French dubbed version of Ghostbusters, the giant Stay Puft Marshmallow Man is named "Bibendum Chamallow". ("Chamallow" was originally a confectionery marketed in France under this name, which vaguely resembles the American marshmallow.)
