= Triptych (disambiguation) =

A triptych is a work of art that is divided into three sections.

Triptych or The Triptych may also refer to:

== Literature ==
- Triptych (Frey novel), a 2011 novel by J. M. Frey
- Triptych (Slaughter novel), a 2006 novel by Karin Slaughter
- Triptych, a 2008 novel by Wendy Coakley-Thompson

== Music and dance ==
- Il trittico, a set of three operas by Giacomo Puccini (1918)
- Triptych of three operas (Mörder, Hoffnung der Frauen ...) by Paul Hindemith (1922)
- New England Triptych, orchestral music by William Schumann (1956)
- "Triptych", a 1982 single by Bryn Jones
- Tríptico elegíaco para un percusionista, orchestral music in three movements by Salvador Chuliá]] (1990)
- Triptych, a 1999 album of the rock band The Tea Party
- Triptych, ballet by Christopher d'Amboise (2000)
- "Triptych", a song by Roxy Music from Country Life
- "Triptych", a song by Arcane Roots from Blood & Chemistry
- "Triptych I-III", a sequence of songs by Celtic Frost from Monotheist
- "BTS Cypher Part 2: Triptych", a song by BTS from Skool Luv Affair
- "Triptych", a song by Samia from The Baby

=== Albums ===
- Triptych (Bloodrock album), 2000
- Triptych (Lotte Anker album), 2005
- Triptych (Shooting at Unarmed Men album), 2007
- Triptych (The Tea Party album), 1999
- The Triptych, a 2005 album by Demon Hunter
- The Triptych, a 2007 album by Fred Deakin of Lemon Jelly

== Other media ==
- Triptych (film), a 2013 Canadian film
- Triptych, May–June 1973, a painting by Francis Bacon
- Triptych of Nava and Grimon, a Flemish painting, dated 1546
- Triptych Pictures, an Australian film production company

== Other uses ==
- Triptych (horse) (1982–1989), a Thoroughbred racehorse
- Triptych (philately), a set of three adjacent postage stamps of related design

== See also ==
- Category:Triptychs
- Tripticks Tapes, an American independent record label
- TripTik, an annotated automobile map
- Triptykon, a Swiss extreme metal band
- Trypticon, a Decepticon from Transformers
- Tryptic: of, pertaining to, or produced by the digestive enzyme trypsin
- Tryptych (album), by Demdike Stare
- Trilogy, a set of three related works of art
