= De Bouches à Oreilles =

Live album by Tryo
- Released: 2004
- Genre: Reggae
- Length: Disc one: 1:11:30; Disc two: 1:03:58
- Label: Yelen Musiques
- Producer: Pierre-Yves Romano

Tryo chronology
Grain De Sable (2003)	De Bouches à Oreilles (2004)

De Bouches à Oreilles is the fourth album and the first live album released by French reggae band Tryo. The band have sold more than 900,000 albums worldwide.

== Track listing ==
CD1 ("A L'Olympia") :

1. "Dans Les Nuages" (6:11)
2. "G8" (3:54)
3. "Con Par Raison" (4:50)
4. "Cogema" (5:02)
5. "Awham (Intro)" (1:59)
6. "Si La Vie M'a Mis Là" (4:57)
7. "Serre-Moi" (5:12)
8. "Pour Un Flirt Avec La Crise" (4:59)
9. "La Main Verte" (2:58)
10. "Comme Les Journées" (3:54)
11. "Yakamoneyé" (8:53)
12. "Pompafrik (Les Nouvelles Colonies)" (10:46)
13. "Vacances Au Texas (Intro)" (4:07)
14. "Maux De Bush" (3:48)

CD2 ("Au Cabaret Sauvage"):

1. "Les Extrêmes" (4:10)
2. "La Révolution" (4:37)
3. "Sortez-les" (4:35)
4. "Plus On En Fait" (3:56)
5. "Tous En Boite - Armstrong" (2:23)
6. "Monsieur Bibendum" (3:24)
7. "Paris" (8:00)
8. "Récréaction" (5:02)
9. "La Misère D'en Face" (6:53)
10. "La Première Fois" (4:20)
11. "Désolé Pour Hier Soir" (7:10)
12. "C'est Du Roots" (5:15)
13. "L'Hymne De Nos Campagnes" (4:13)
