= Triptych =

Artwork divided into three parts

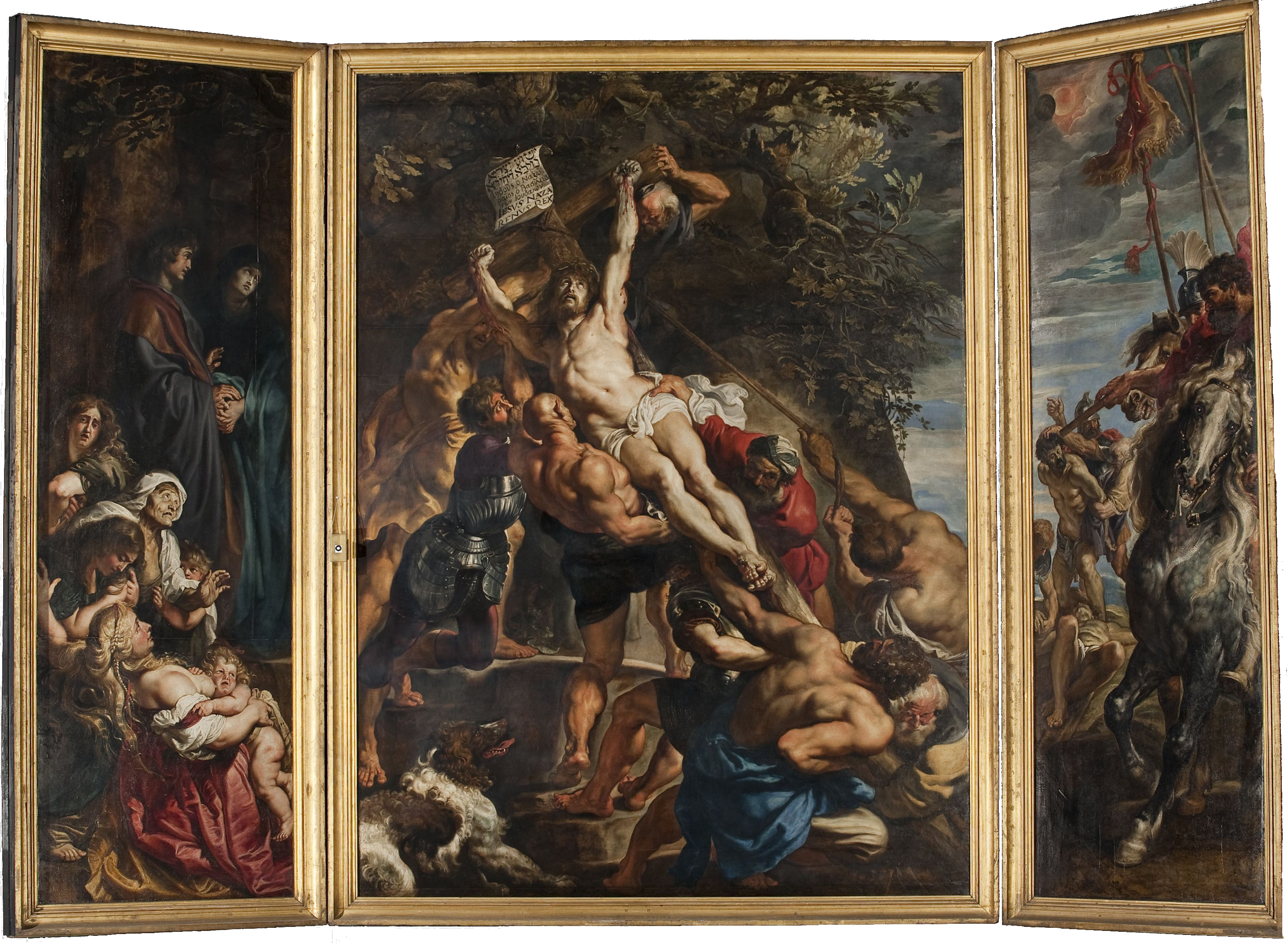
Triptych of the Raising of the Cross, Rubens, 1610–11, Antwerp Cathedral

A triptych (/ˈtrɪptɪk/ TRIP-tik) is a work of art (usually a panel painting) that is divided into three sections, or three carved panels that are hinged together and can be folded shut or displayed open. It is therefore a type of polyptych, the term for all multi-panel works. The middle panel is typically the largest and flanked by two smaller related works, although there are triptychs of equal-sized panels. The form can also be used for pendant jewelry.

Beyond its usual meaning in the visual arts, the term is sometimes used as a title or descriptive term in other arts media such as music or the performing arts for works with three parts.

== Etymology ==
The word triptych was formed in English by compounding the prefix tri- (meaning three) with the word diptych. Diptych is borrowed from the Latin diptycha, which itself is derived from the Late Greek δίπτυχα (díptycha) 'pair of writing tablets'. δίπτυχα is the neuter plural of δίπτυχος (díptychos) 'double-folded'.

== In art ==
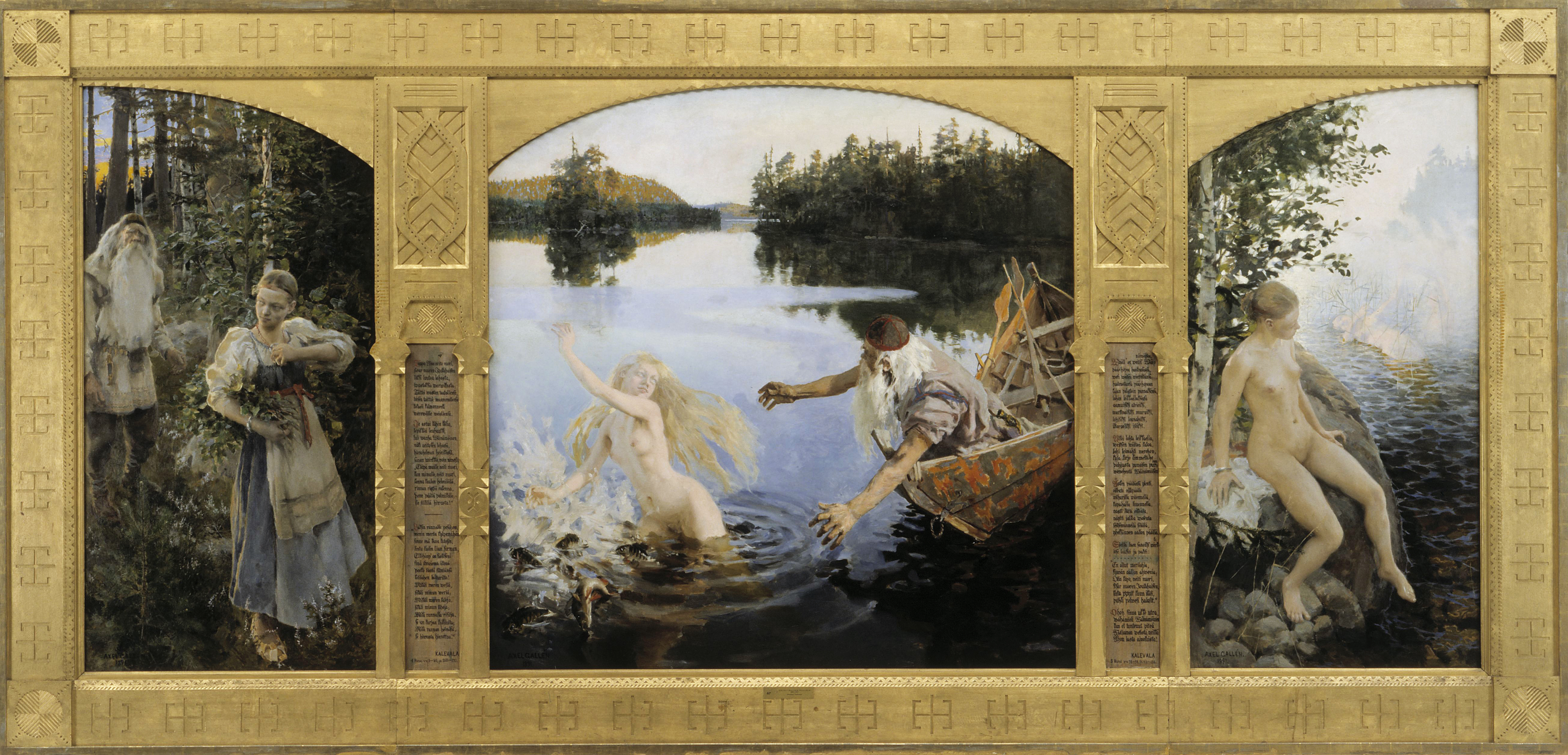
The Aino Myth, the Kalevala based triptych by Akseli Gallen-Kallela, 1891, Ateneum, Helsinki

The triptych form appears in early Christian art, and was a popular standard format for altar paintings from the Middle Ages onwards. Its geographical range was from the eastern Byzantine churches to the Celtic churches in the west. During the Byzantine period, triptychs were often used for private devotional use, along with other relics such as icons. Renaissance painters such as Hans Memling and Hieronymus Bosch used the form. Sculptors also used it. Triptych forms also allow ease of transport.

From the Gothic period onward, both in Europe and elsewhere, altarpieces in churches and cathedrals were often in triptych form. One such cathedral with an altarpiece triptych is Llandaff Cathedral. The Cathedral of Our Lady in Antwerp, Belgium, contains two examples by Rubens, and Notre Dame de Paris is another example of the use of triptychs in architecture. The form is echoed by the structure of many ecclesiastical stained glass windows.

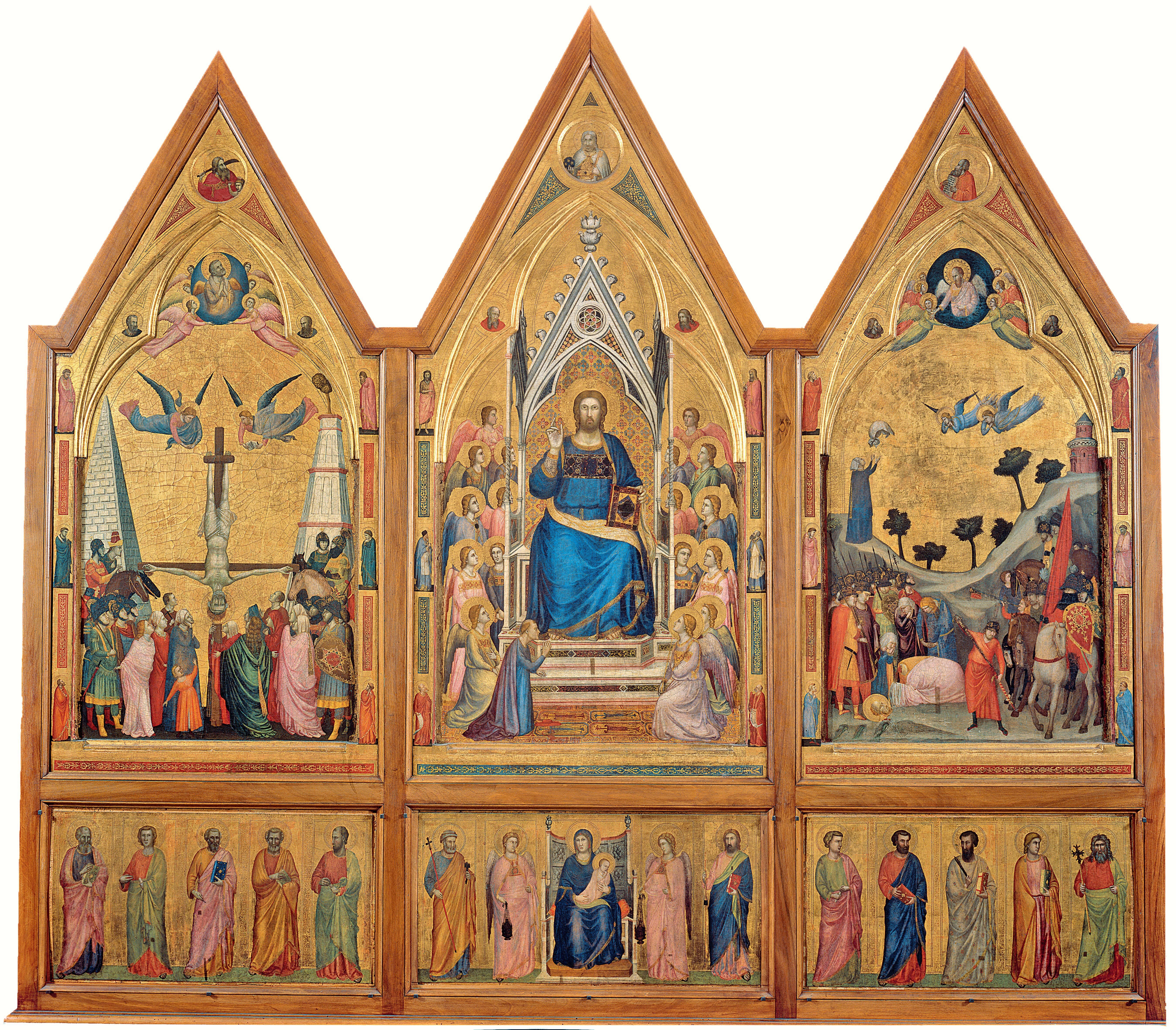
The Stefaneschi Triptych, Giotto, c. 1315–20

The triptych form's transportability was exploited during World War Two when a private citizens' committee in the United States commissioned painters and sculptors to create portable three-panel hinged altarpieces for use by Christian and Jewish U.S. troops for religious services. By the end of the war, 70 artists had created 460 triptychs. Among the most prolific were Violet Oakley, Nina Barr Wheeler, and Hildreth Meiere.

The triptych format has been used in non-Christian faiths, including, Judaism, Islam, and Buddhism. For example: the triptych Hilje-j-Sherif displayed at the National Museum of Oriental Art, Rome, Italy, and a page of the Qur'an at the Museum of Turkish and Islamic Arts in Istanbul, Turkey, exemplify Ottoman religious art adapting the motif. Likewise, Tibetan Buddhists have used it in traditional altars.

Although strongly identified as a religious altarpiece form, triptychs outside that context have been created, some of the best-known examples being works by Max Beckmann and Francis Bacon. When Bacon's 1969 triptych, Three Studies of Lucian Freud, was sold in 2013 for $142.4 million, it was the highest price ever paid for an artwork at auction at that time. That record was broken in May 2015 by $179.4 million for Pablo Picasso's 1955 painting Les Femmes d'Alger.

=== Examples ===
- Stefaneschi Triptych by Giotto, c. 1330
- Annunciation with St. Margaret and St. Ansanus by Simone Martini, 1333
- The Mérode Altarpiece by Robert Campin, late 1420s
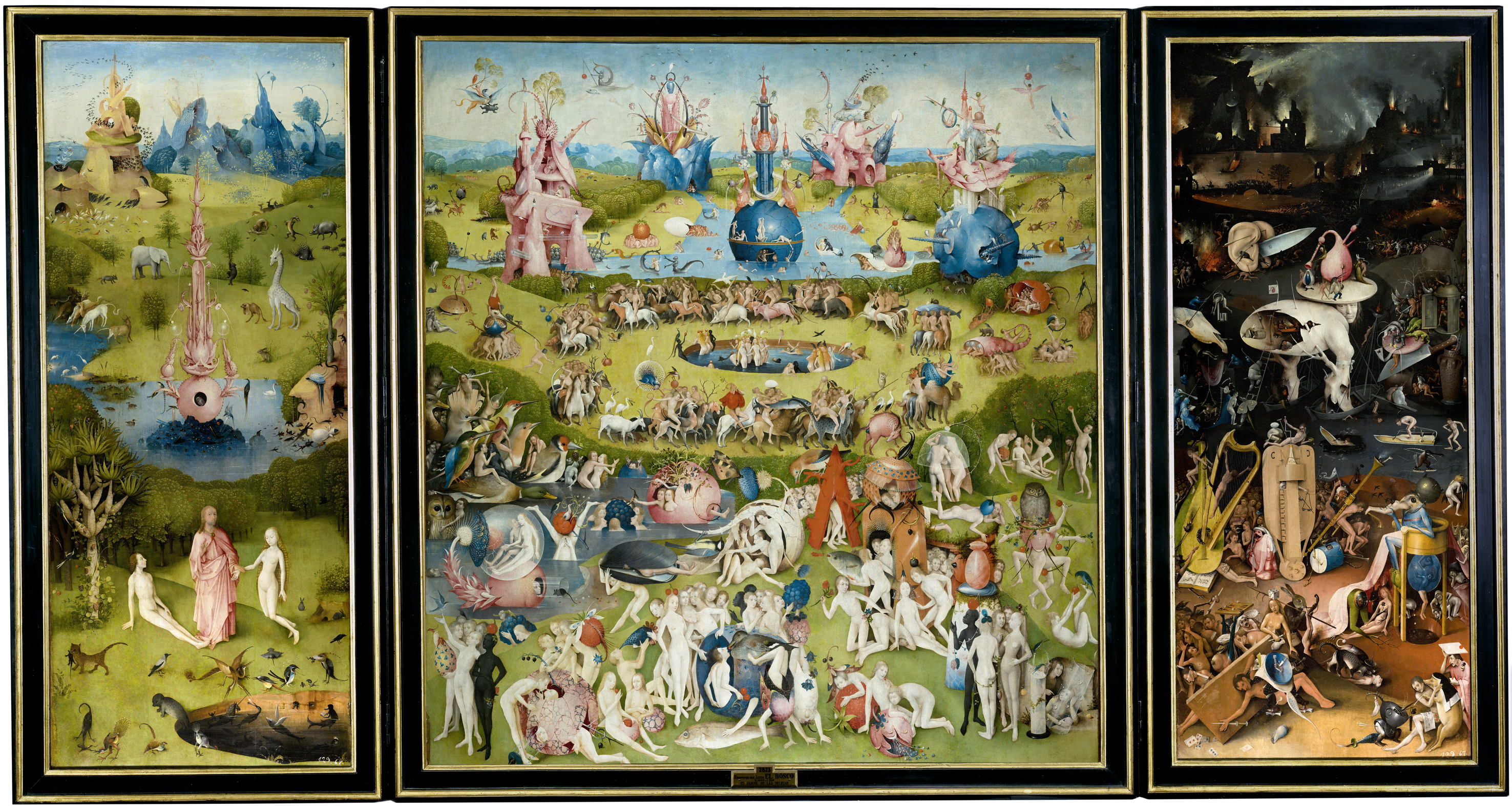
  Hieronymus Bosch, The Garden of Earthly Delights, 1490–1510. Museo del Prado, Madrid
- The Last Judgement by Hans Memling, c. 1467
- The Garden of Earthly Delights, Triptych of the Temptation of St. Anthony and The Haywain Triptych by Hieronymus Bosch
- The Portinari Altarpiece by Hugo van der Goes, c. 1475
- The Buhl Altarpiece, c. 1495
- The Raising of the Cross by Peter Paul Rubens, 1610 or 1611
- The Aino Myth triptych by Akseli Gallen-Kallela, 1891
- The Pioneer by Frederick McCubbin, 1904
- Departure by Max Beckmann, 1932–33
- Three Studies for Figures at the Base of a Crucifixion by Francis Bacon, 1944

== In photography ==
A photographic triptych is a common style used in modern commercial artwork. The photographs are usually arranged with a plain border between them.

The work may consist of separate images that are variants on a theme, or may be one larger image split into three.

== In films ==
A triptych film somewhat appears to be as an anthology film, consists in three segments with similar structure, either designs or ensemble casts. It overlaps with trilogy, but it is not commonly referred to with the term.

=== Examples ===
- Makoto Shinkai's coming-of-age romantic drama anime film 5 Centimeters per Second consists of three segments following a period in the life of the protagonist Takaki Tōno and his relationships with the girls around him.
- Netflix's stop motion television special The House divided into three chapters telling different stories in spanning different worlds, interior designs, and characters (consisting of humans, anthropomorphic rodents and insects, and felines) set in the same house; each story deals with the themes: madness (And Heard Within, A Lie Is Spun), wealth (Then Lost Is Truth That Can't Be Won), and pursuit of true happiness (Listen Again And Seek The Sun).
- Yorgos Lanthimos's black comedy film Kinds of Kindness consists of three distinct but loosely connected stories involving the character R.M.F., along with the same ensemble casts, structured as a "triptych fable".
- Javier Calvo and Javier Ambrossi's La bola negra underpins a narrative triptych about three different Spanish men.

== In music ==
Musical compositions named a triptych include:

- New England Triptych, orchestral music by William Schumann (1956)
- Tríptico elegíaco para un percusionista, orchestral music in three movements by Salvador Chuliá (1990)
- Triptych, a 1999 album of the rock band The Tea Party
- The Triptych, a 2005 album of the metalcore band Demon Hunter
- “Painters of the tempest - part II - Triptych Lux”, a song by Ne Obliviscaris, from their second album “citadel” (2014)
- Tanz/Haus: triptych 2017 and other chamber music works by James Dillon (2017)
- "Triptych", a song by Samia on her debut album The Baby (2020)

== In performing arts ==
Stage works named a triptych include:

- Il trittico, a set of three operas by Giacomo Puccini (1918)
- Triptych of three operas (Mörder, Hoffnung der Frauen, Das Nusch-Nuschi, Sancta Susanna) by Paul Hindemith (1922)
- Triptych, a ballet by Christopher d'Amboise (2000)

== Gallery ==
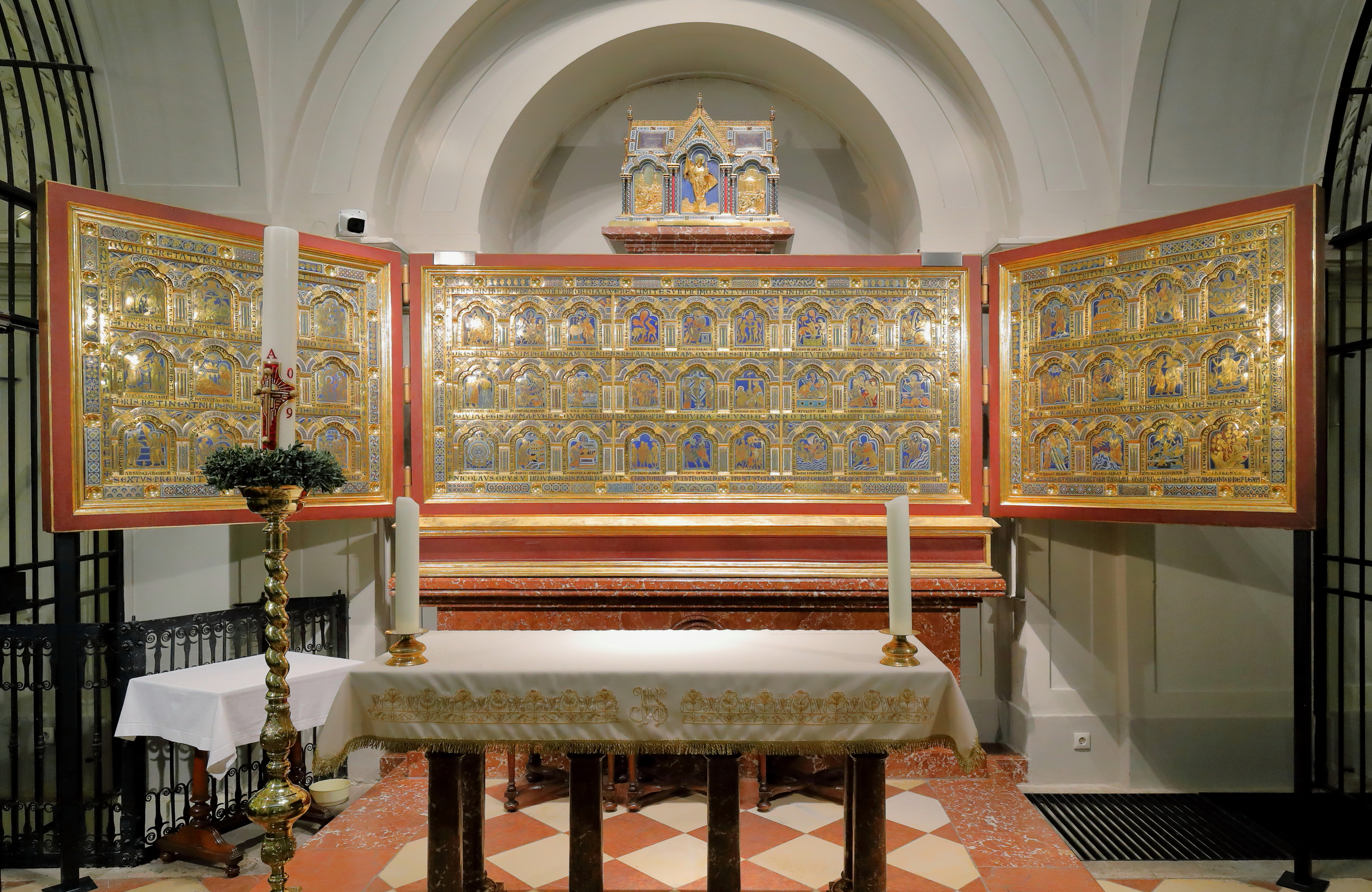
The Verdun Altar, 1181, Klosterneuburg Monastery

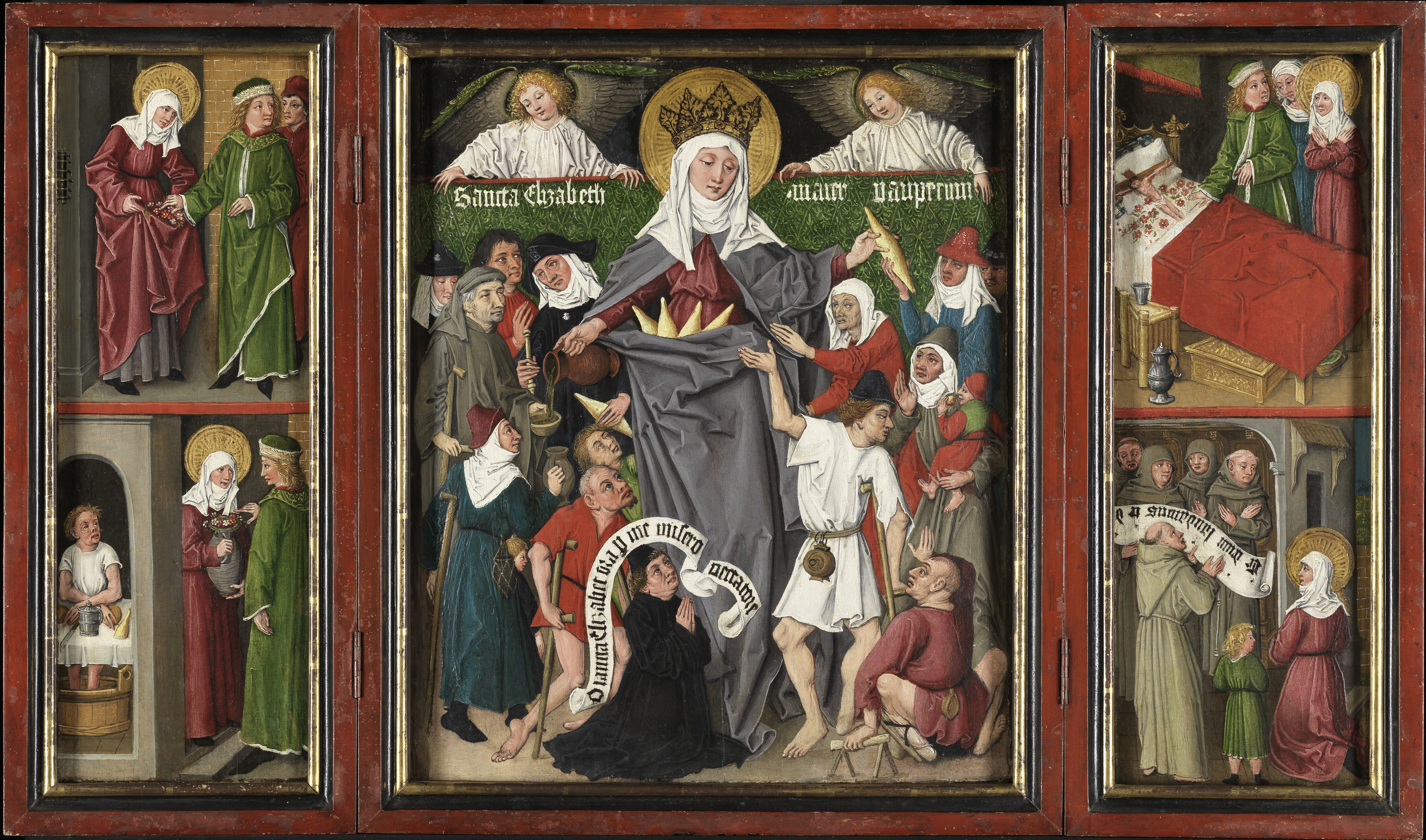
Elizabeth Triptych, c. 1480–1490, Master of the Drapery Studies, Staatliche Kunsthalle, Karlsruhe

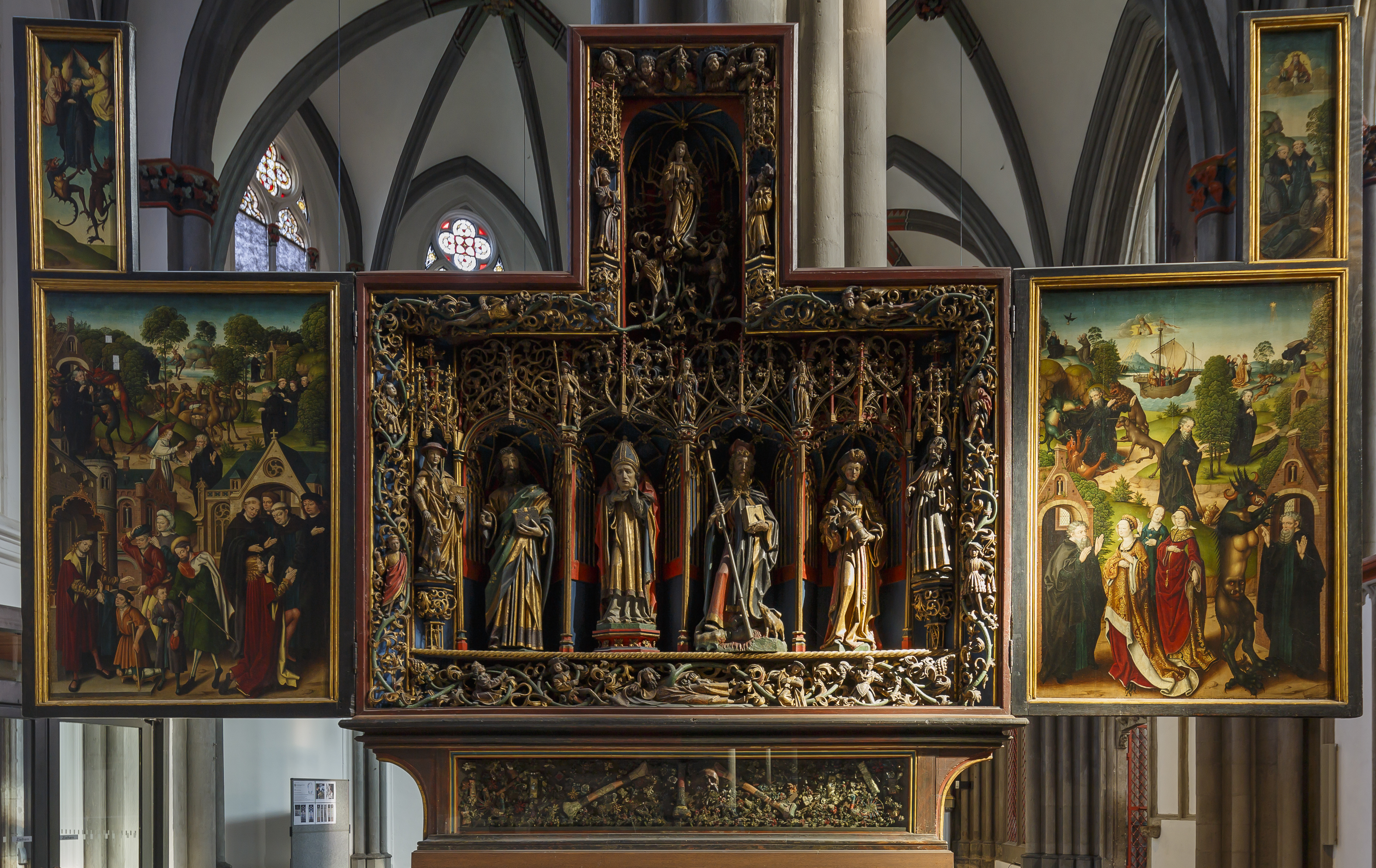
Mixed media triptych of Saint Anthony, ca. 1500, Xanten Cathedral in Xanten

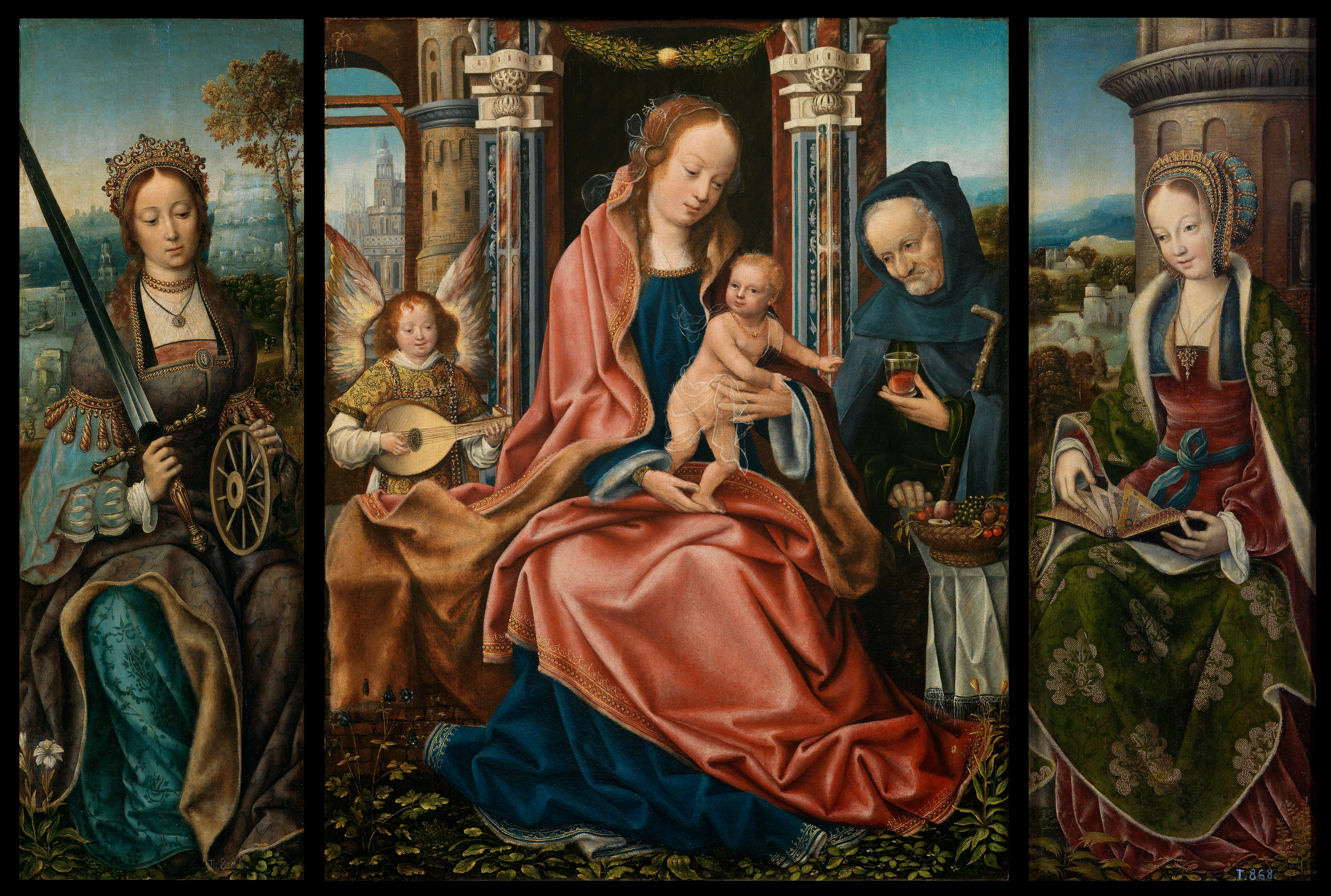
Workshop of the Master of Frankfurt, Sagrada Familia con ángel músico, Santa Catalina de Alejandría, Santa Bárbara, 1510–1520, Museo del Prado, Madrid
