= Three Valleys =

Three Valleys may refer to:

== Places ==
- Three Valleys, a homestead in North Bungunya, Queensland, Australia
- Three Valleys, a former electoral ward in Dorset, England, UK
- Les Trois Vallées (French: The 3 Valleys), Tarentaise Valley, Savoie, France; a ski region in Southeastern France
- Tres Valles (Spanish: 3 Valleys), Veracruz, Mexico; a town and municipality
- Three Valley Gap (3 Valley), Shuswap Country, British Columbia, Canada
- Three Valleys Ranch Heliport (FAA id OG47), Baker City, Oregon, USA; see List of private-use airports in Oregon

== Groups, organizations ==
- Three Valleys Water, England, UK; a priave British water company
- Three Valleys Metropolitan Water District, California, USA; see Metropolitan Water District of Southern California
- Three Valleys State Bank, Three Forks, Montana, USA
- The Three Valleys Centre, Bradford College, Yorkshire, England, UK

== See also ==
- Valley (disambiguation)
- Three (disambiguation)
- Tri-Valley (disambiguation)
