= Tri-Valley Conference =

Tri-Valley Conference is the name of several school athletic conferences in the United States:

- Tri-Valley Conference (Kansas)
- Tri-Valley Conference (Michigan)
- Tri-Valley Conference (Minnesota) (Disbanded in 2002)
- Tri-Valley Conference (Ohio)
- Tri-Valley Conference (Oregon)

== See also ==
- Tri-Valley League (disambiguation)
- Tri-Valley (disambiguation)
