= Tri-Valley High School =

Tri-Valley High School may refer to:

- Tri-Valley Central School, Grahamsville, New York
- Tri-Valley High School, Cambridge, Idaho
- Tri-Valley High School, Downs, Illinois
- Tri-Valley High School, Dresden, Ohio
- Tri-Valley High School, Colton, South Dakota
- Tri-Valley School, Healy, Alaska
- Tri-Valley Junior/Senior High School, Hegins, Pennsylvania

== See also ==
- Tri-Valley (disambiguation)
