= Tri-Valley League =

Tri-Valley League may refer to:

- Tri-Valley League (CIF), California
- Tri-Valley League (MIAA), Massachusetts

== See also ==
- Tri-Valley Conference (disambiguation)
- Tri-Valley (disambiguation)
