= La Rue Kétanou =

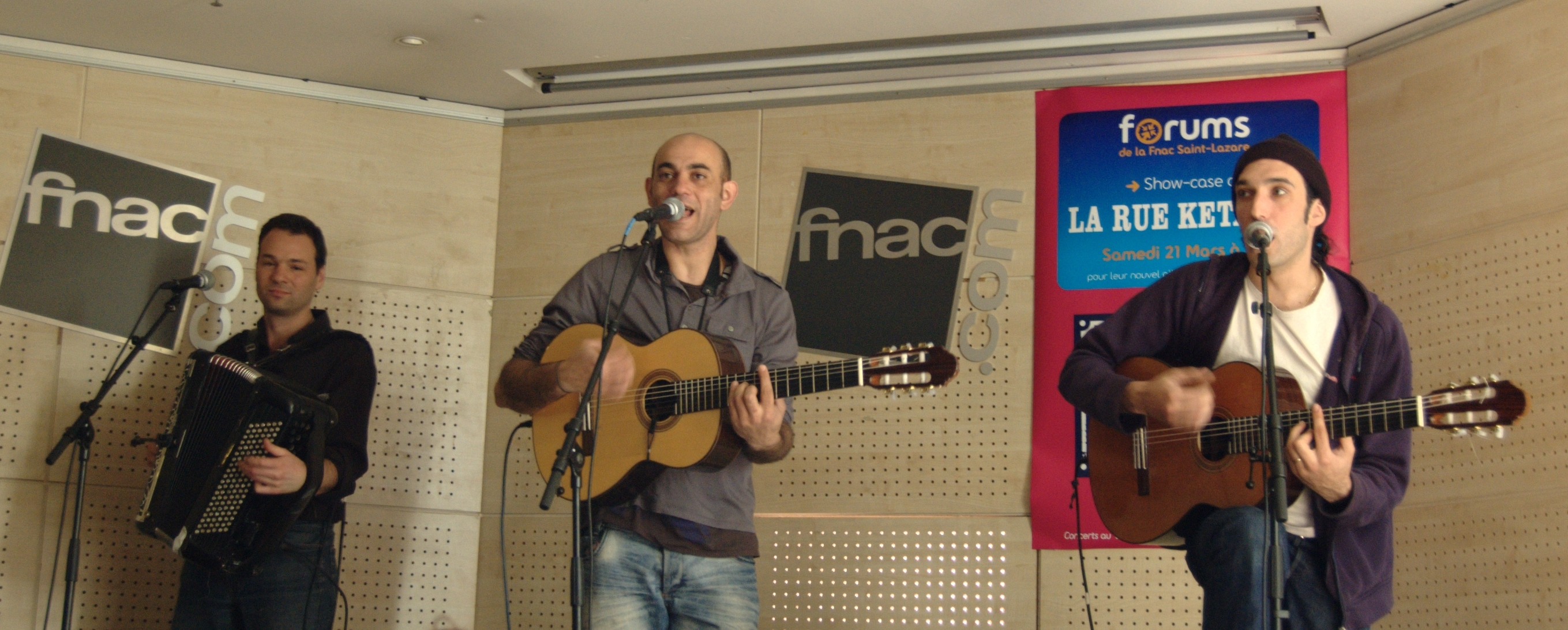
La rue ketanou

La Rue Ketanou is a French music group that blends chanson and folk rock mixed with elements of reggae music, bohemian style of life, theatre, poetry and humor. Its name is a deformation of La rue qui est à nous, which means The street that's ours.

== History of the band ==
The group is composed of musicians Mourad Musset, Olivier Leite, and Florent Vintrigner, all from the Théâtre du fil in Paris. At first the trio played in the streets of la Rochelle and the île de Ré. The show was a mix of theater and music. The group's motto was "C'est pas nous qui sommes à la rue, c'est la rue qui est à nous ('Ketanou')", meaning literally: "We don't belong to the street; it's the street that belongs to us." This could also be rendered as: "We are not bums; the street is ours."

After spending some time living a semi-bohemian life, the group met Bibou, a member of Tryo, who invited them to open for Tryo's shows at L'Olympia and for the rest of their tour.

The band's first album, En attendant les caravanes (Waiting for the caravans) was finally produced in 2001. After some time touring France, the group completed a second album, Y'a des cigales dans la fourmilière (There are cicadas in the ant-hill), in 2002. In 2004, they released a live album, Ouvert à double tour. After this album, there were rumors that they were about to break up, but so far the band continues to perform together. Florent did spend some time in a related project, the group T'inquiète Lazare. Mourad and Olivier also formed a new band with several other musicians and friends, Mon côté punk.

The group has recently been touring with two new members, Pierre Joseph and Simoné Monticelloni.

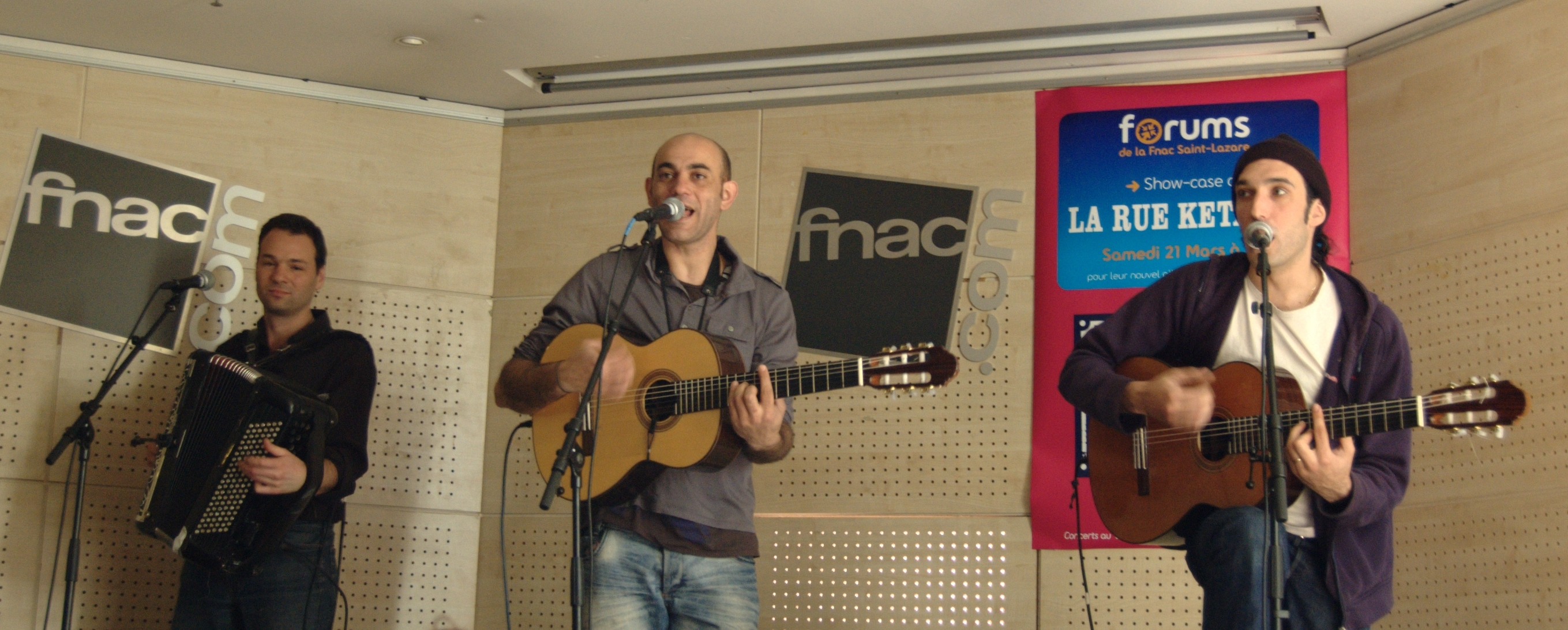
La Rue Kétanou

== Official members ==
- Florent Vintrigner: accordion
- Olivier Leite: guitar
- Mourad Musset: guitar

== Discography ==
=== Albums ===
Year	Album	Peak positions	
Year	Album	FRA	BEL (Wa)
2001	En attendant les caravanes	–	–
2002	Y'a des cigales dans la fourmilière	32	–
2004	Ouvert à double tour...	22	–
2009	À contre sens	12	–
2011	La Rue Ketanou et le Josem	75	–
2014	Allons voir	16	178
2020	2020	41	—

=== Singles ===
Year	Single	Peak positions	Album
Year	Single	FR	Album
2014	"La Guitare Sud Américaine"	82	Allons voir
