= Three Musicians =

Three Musicians may refer to:

- Trio (music)
- Three Musicians (Picasso), either of two oil paintings of the same subject by Pablo Picasso
- Three Musicians (Velázquez), an oil painting by Diego Velázquez
