= Trio (Sugarman) =

Public sculpture near Milwaukee, Wisconsin, USA

Coordinates: 43°10′33.9″N 87°56′18.5″W

- Artist: George Sugarman
- Year: 1969-1972
- Type: painted aluminum
- Dimensions: 300 cm × 970 cm × 450 cm (119 in × 382 in × 177 in)
- Location: Various

Trio is a public art work by artist George Sugarman on permanent display at the Lynden Sculpture Garden near Milwaukee, Wisconsin and the Empire State Plaza in Albany, New York. The aluminum sculpture is painted bright yellow and consists of a series of abstract loops.
