= Tryo =

French reggae band

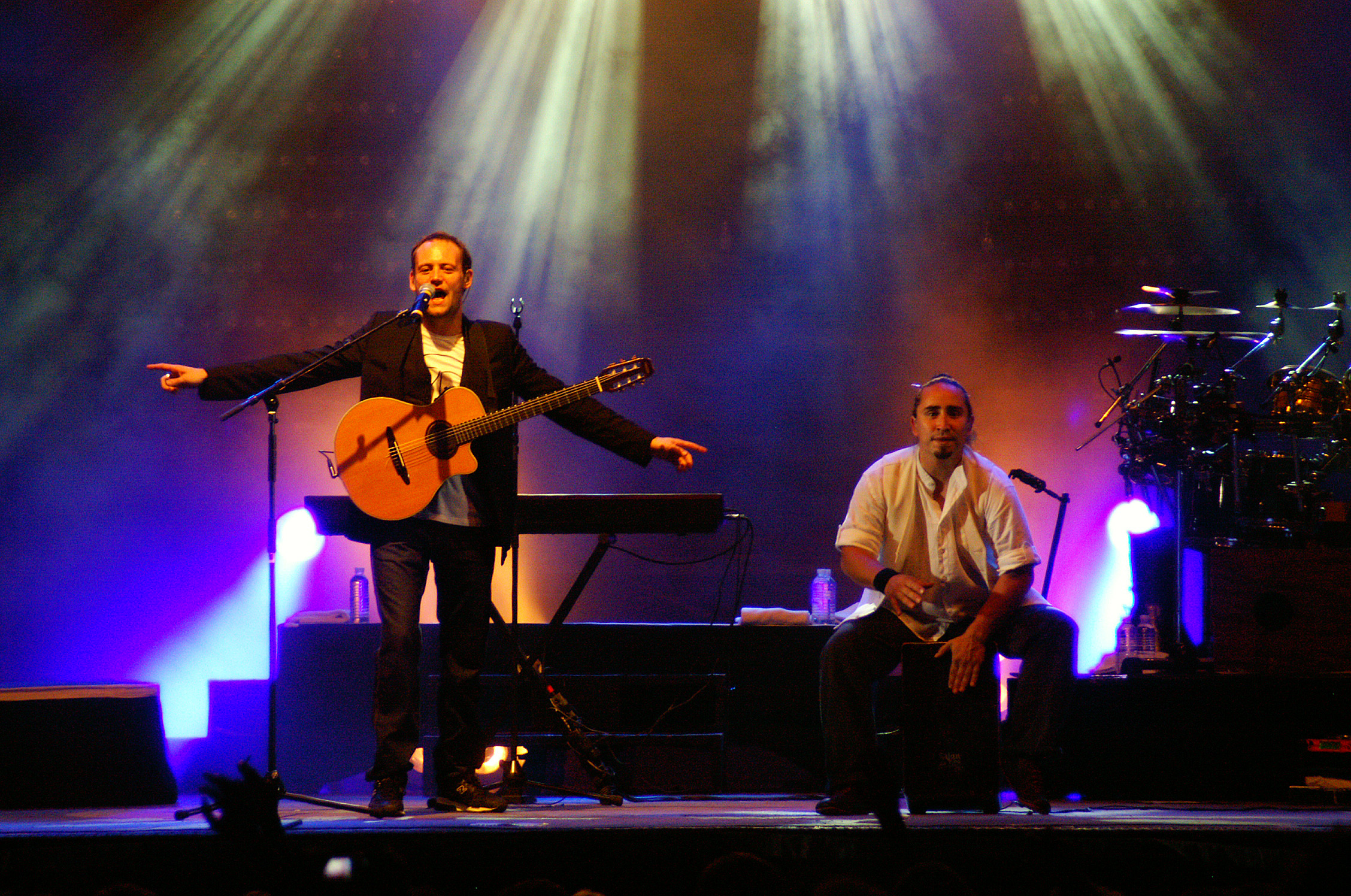
- Tryo performing 2007

Background information
- Origin: France
- Genres: Reggae, French music
- Years active: 1995–present
- Label: Columbia (Sony Music)
- Members: Cyril Célestin (Guizmo); Christophe Mali (Mali); Emmanuel Eveno (Manu); Daniel Bravo (Danielito); Sébastien Pujol (Bibou)
- Website: tryo.com

Tryo (pronounced [tʁijo]) is a French-language 'unplugged' ska acoustic band, popular in Europe and Quebec, with three French guitarists, a percussionist, and a producer: Guizmo, Christophe Mali, Manu Eveno, Daniel "Danielito" Bravo and Bibou.

Tryo are popular in France partly due to their politically charged lyrics, whilst also showing a fun side with a range of humorous songs, especially in live performances.

They take a left wing stance, criticising various French politicians such as Charles Pasqua (named in corruption scandals concerning suburban low cost housing or HLM) and Jean-Marie Le Pen and world leaders (George W. Bush, for example) in their music. The band has a "tolerant" view on cannabis, demonstrated by "La Main Verte" from the Mamagubida album. Drug references are reduced in their later albums.

They have sold 900,000 albums. They had their 10-year anniversary in 2005, followed by a nationwide tour. Tryo have four studio albums, a double CD live album and two live DVDs.

Band members were also active in independent work. Christophe Mali released a solo album Je vous emmène in April 2006. Guitarist and songwriter Guizmo was part of the band Pause.

In August 2012 they released new album called Ladilafé, a tribute to Patricia Bonnetaud who died in February 2012. This is the first album featuring DJ Catman.

== Members ==
- Guizmo – real name Cyril Célestin – singer, composer, musician (guitar) – Refer to separate section below
- Mali – real name Christophe Petit – singer, composer, musician (guitar, accordion, piano, melodica) – Refer to separate section below
- Manu – real name Manu Eveno – singer, musician (guitar, bass, oud, flute, clarinet, tablas)
- Danielito – real name Daniel Bravo – musician (drums, djembé, darbouka, congas, guiro, cajón, bendir, bongos, violin)
- Bibou – real name Sébastien Pujol – manager, sound engineer

== Side projects ==
=== Guizmo ===
Guizmo
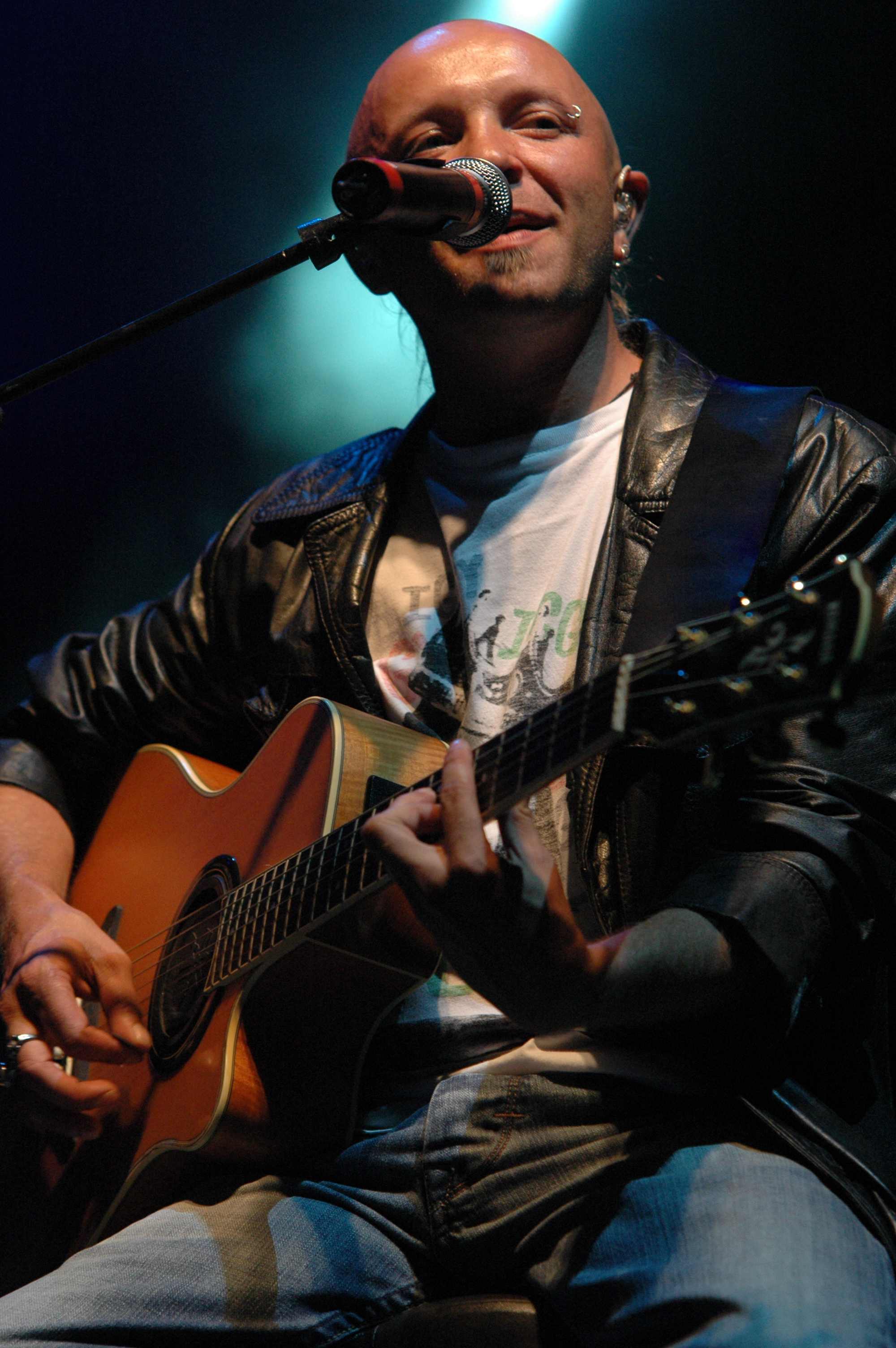
- Guizmo with Tryo during Pinède Gould Festival at Juan-les-Pins, July 2007

Background information
- Born: Cyril Célestin; 11 April 1972 (age 54); 14e arrondissement, Paris, France
- Occupations: Singer, songwriter, musician
- Instruments: Vocals, guitar
- Years active: 1989 – present

Guizmo, real name Cyril Célestin, born in the 14e arrondissement in Paris on 11 April 1972, singer, composer, and guitarist for Tryo, has had a prosperous solo career on his own. He grew up in Cachan in an HLM for low income families. He started performing as a 14-year-old, leaving school after high school. With Manu Eveno, whom he met in 1989 when he was 17, they both formed part of M'Panada, a reggae rock and funk group, for almost 5 years. The band split up in 1994. With Emmanuel "Manu" Eveno and Christophe Mali, he took part in the musical comedy Histoire de piano written by Christophe Mali and Maïa Rubinstein. This was the beginning for the eventual formation of Tryo.

Besides Tryo, Guizmo was active in the music collective Desert Rebel, a joint cultural project launched by Tuareg guitarist Abdallah Oumbadougou. Desert Rebel made a tour of Niger.

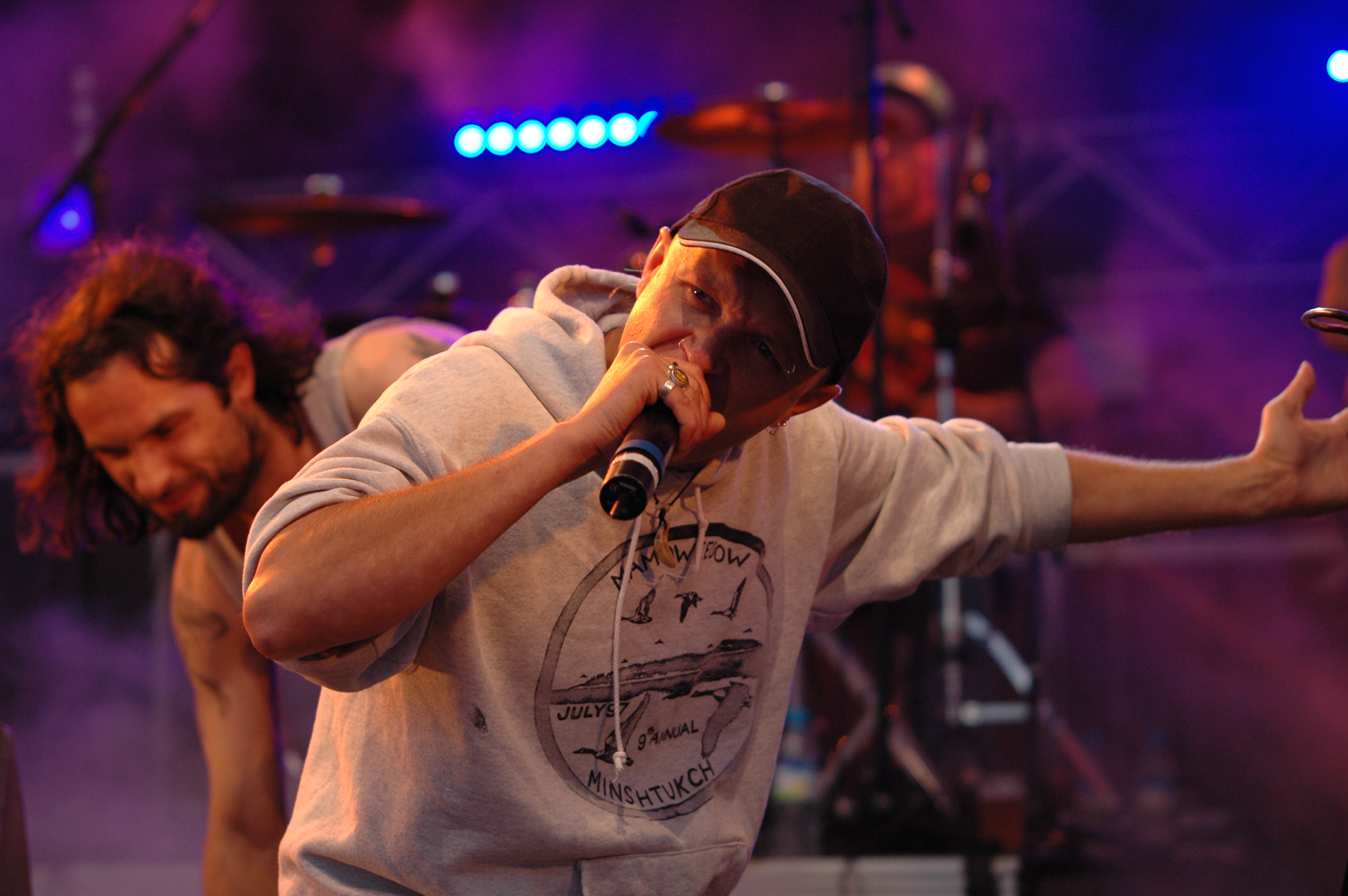
Guizmo (front) and Negoos (back) in a Pause concert in Bretigny-sur-Orge, June 2007

Other projects Guizmo was involved him included the band Pause contributing as singer, songwriter and composer. The band was made up of Guizmo (vocals), Negoos (vocals), Daniel Jamet and Olivier Mizrachi (guitars), Thomas Loyer (keyboards), Julien Bonvoisin (bass) and Sébastien Le Bon (Zeb) (drums).

In spring 2012, he took part in the music collective On y pense. That collective was formed by initiative of the duo from Le Pied de la Pompe, in addition to Zeitoun (from La rue kétanou) and by Alee.

=== Mali ===
Mali (Christophe "Mali" Petit)
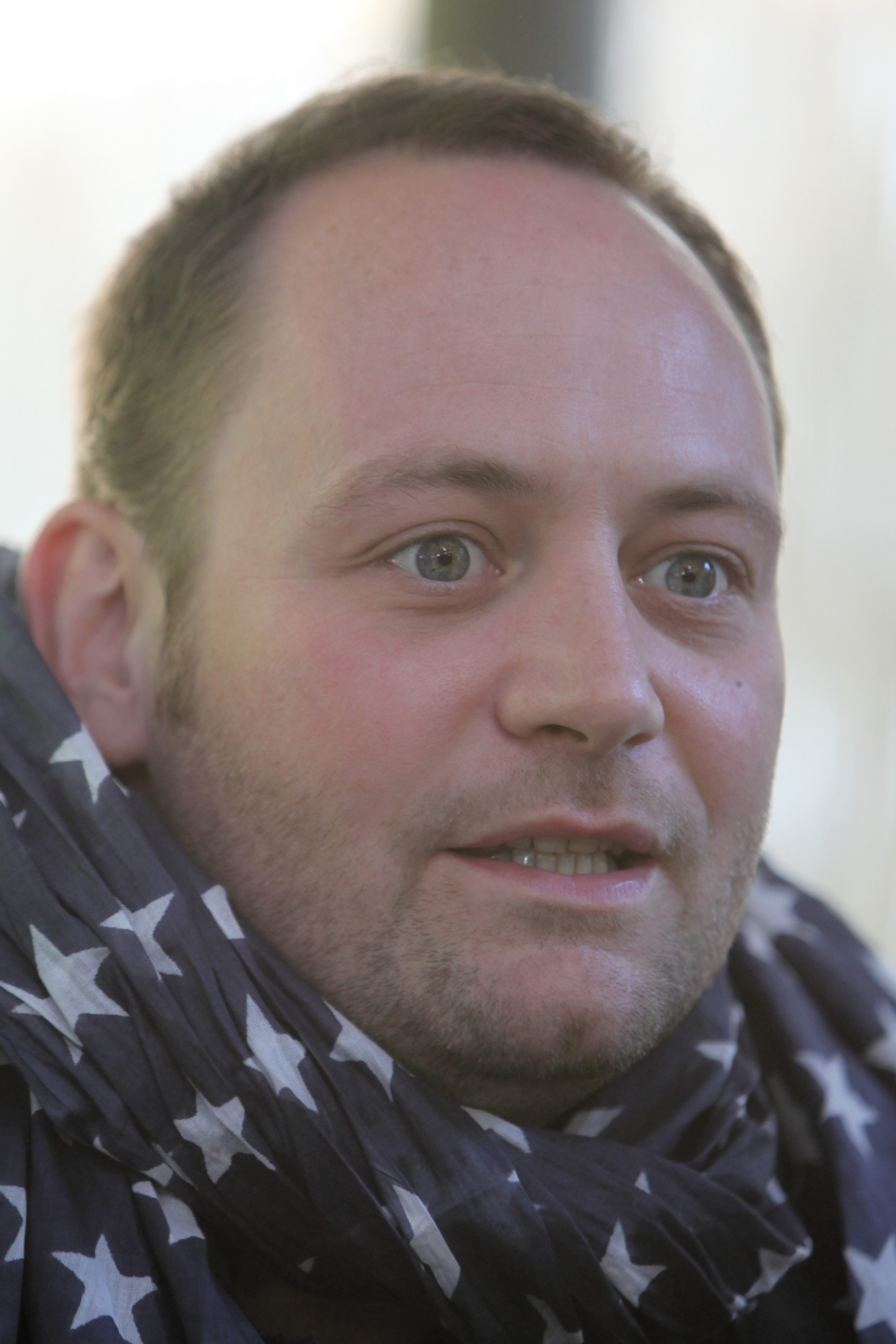
- Christophe Mali at Eurockéennes, Belfort, 2011

Background information
- Born: Christophe Petit; 25 August 1976 (age 50); Antony, Hauts-de-Seine, France
- Occupations: Singer, songwriter, musician
- Instruments: Vocals, guitar, accordion, piano
- Years active: 1990 – present

Christophe Mali known as Mali, singer, composer, musician (guitar, accordion, piano, melodica) for Tryo, real name Christophe Petit, was born in Antony, Hauts-de-Seine on 25 August 1976. He was named Mali by Slavic fellow actors he worked with at the beginning of his career as Petit, his family name translates to 'Mali' in Serbo-Croat languages.

As a young kid, he was passionate about theatre, and improvisation in particular. He became part of the Antony-based theatre group Firmin Gémier, and later in theatre group Zarina Khan where he notably played Raskolnikov in a French adaptation of Crime and Punishment (in French Crime et Châtiment written by Fyodor Dostoyevsky. Christophe Mali himself wrote a number of theatre pieces and 'mis en scène' of musical comedies, in which he would also act and play music for.

He studied for a bachelor's degree (licence) in Philosophy and Sociology, but cut short his education to concentrate in acting and music.

He co-wrote the musical comedy Histoire de piano with Maïa Rubinstein. He offered roles for Emmanuel "Manu" Eveno and for Cyril Célestin (Guizmo) to act in it. This was the beginning for the eventual formation of Tryo in 1995, a 5-piece band that included Mali, Manu and Guizmo in addition to Daniel Bravo (Danielito) and Sebastien Pujol (Bibou). Mali was a singer, guitar, accordion and piano player for Tryo.

Christophe Mali has also developed since 2004 a solo musical career and was involved in several projects.

Influenced by Thomas Fersen, Jacques Higelin and others, he wrote about more intimate and profound subject as different from the reggae and festive air of Tryo materials. He also wrote for other artists like Jean Guidoni, Olivia Ruiz, Marina (of Star Academy) and Lambert Wilson amongst others. He also cooperated for a show with Gérald Dahan. He has also been a music consultant for Francofolies de La Rochelle. In 2011, he engaged in mise en scène in a show at Boulevard des Airs.

==== Christophe Mali solo discography ====
Studio albums

- 2006: Je vous emmène (FR: #54)

=== Manu ===
Manu (Emmanuel Eveno)
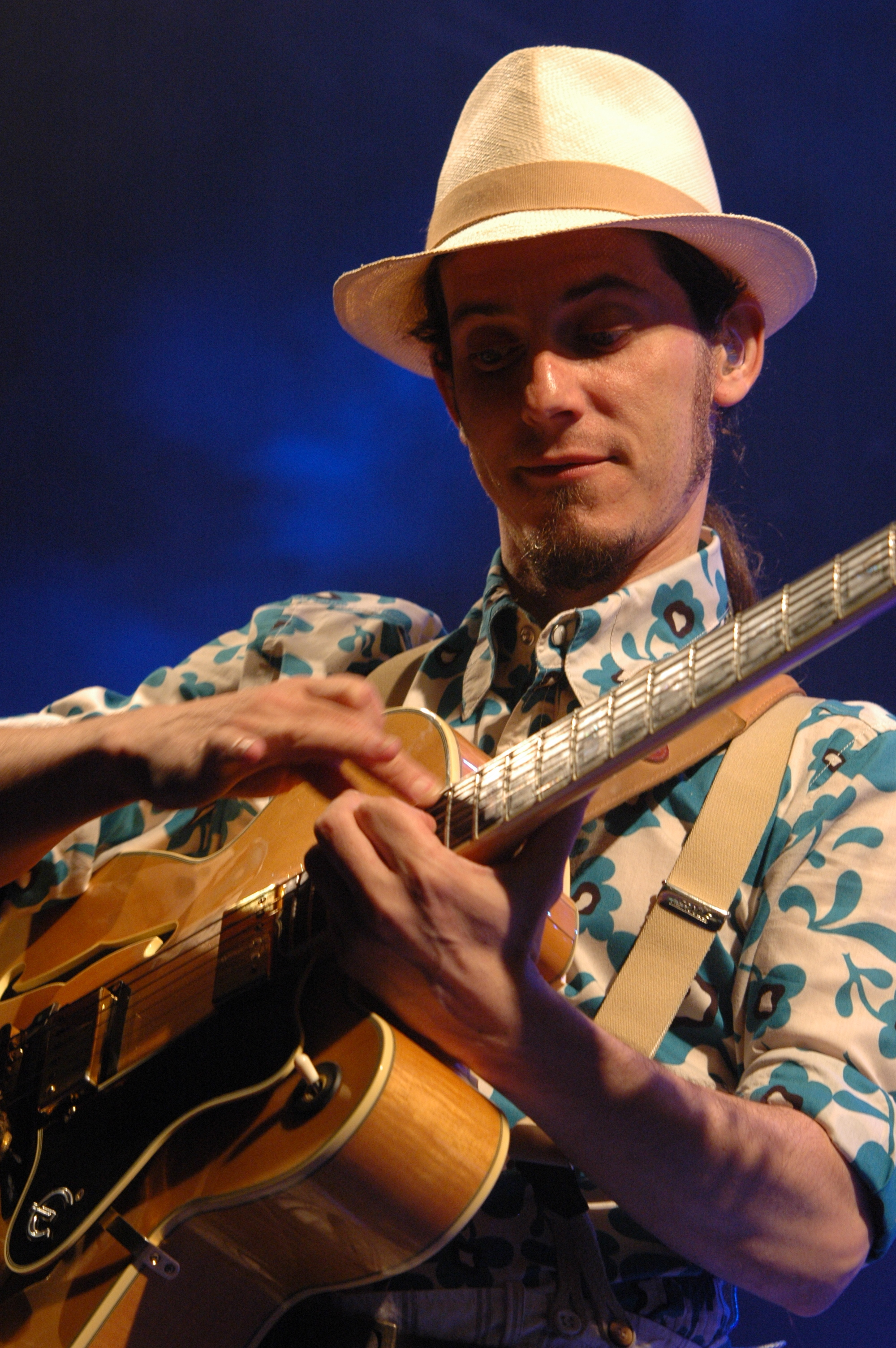
- Manu Eveno playing with Tryo at Pinède Gould Festival, at Juan-les-Pins July 2007

Background information
- Born: Emmanuel Eveno
- Occupation: musician

Manu Eveno real name Emmanuel Eveno, also known as Numa, born 7 May 1971 is a guitarist for Tryo. He is a vocalist in addition to playing guitar, bass, oud, flute, clarinet and tablas.

Manu started in 1988 with the band M'Panada that also included eventual tryo vocalist Guizmo. He was also involved in a few other bands. He met Christophe Mali for a show co-written by the latter called Histoire de piano and the three became founding members of Tryo after the musical comedy. He has also taken part in various materials for the band Pause.

Manu also plays tablas for Tryo as he learned playing the instrument in India.

=== Danielito ===
Danielito (Daniel "Danielito" Bravo)
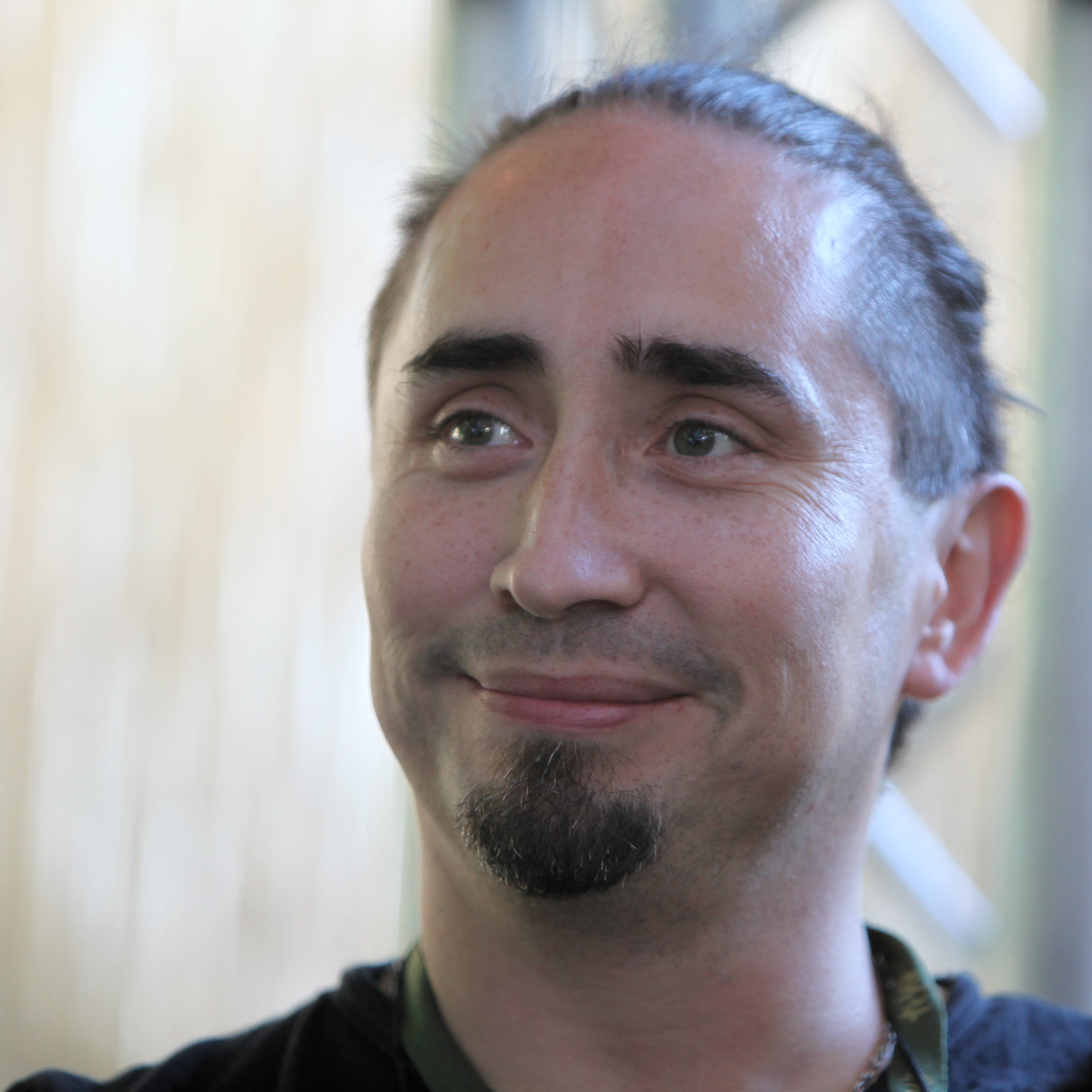

Background information
- Born: Daniel Bravo; Chile
- Occupation: musician
- Instrument: Percussion

Danielito, real name Daniel Bravo, also known as Ito, is the band's percussionist of Chilean origin. He studied playing percussion instruments at the music conservatory at 16, and has been in a dozen formations before joining Tryo. He plays drums, djembé, bongos, darbuka, congas, güiro, cajón, bendir, tambourin, udu as well as batajon, krakebs, timbao etc.

He has also taken part in the band Pause with Guzimo, another Tryo member.

=== Bibou ===
Bibou (Sébastien Pujol)
- Born: Sébastien Pujol
- Occupations: Manager and producer

Sébastien Pujol known as Bibou, is the manager and producer for the group Tryo. He self-produced the debut album of the band Mamagubida in 1998 reportedly selling 15 thousand copies of the album. He remains the director of the band (including productions, editions, shows).

He also manages the reggae band Sunshiners that is made up of ex-members of Mister Gang. Members are mainly from Vanuatu. Some members of Mister Gang were recording with Tryo and that's where they met Bibou, who convinced them to launch Sunshiners. The new formation was made up of vocalist Gero Iaviniau, John Kapala, Jake Moses and Ben Siro as well as musicians Arthur Romijn (guitar), Chewinoo (drums), Toko (bass), Capt'n (keyboards), Feal Le Rouzic (saxophone), Mols (trumpet) and Thomas (trombone), Sunshiners had their debut album in June 2006, composed of reggae remakes of 1980s songs including hits by The Cure, Supertramp, David Bowie, Rod Stewart, Tears for Fears and others.

== Discography ==
=== Albums ===
==== Studio albums ====
Year	Album	Peak positions				Certifications
Year	Album	FRA	BEL (Fl)	BEL (Wa)	SWI	Certifications
1998	Mamagubida	7	–	–	–	
2000	Faut qu'ils s'activent	8	–	–	–	
2003	Grain de sable	6	–	27	50	
2008	Ce que l'on sème	1	–	3	12	
2012	Ladilafé	1	157	1	26	
2014	Né quelque part	43	–	71	–	
2016	Vent debout	13	–	29	–	
2020	XXV ans	4	–	21	–	
2021	Chants de bataille	–	–	38	–	

==== Live albums ====
Year	Album	Peak positions				Certifications
Year	Album	FRA	BEL (Fl)	BEL (Wa)	SWI	Certifications
2004	De Bouches à Oreilles	8	–	81	98	
2009	Sous les Etoiles	37	–	58	–	

==== Box albums ====
- 2005: Mamagubida / Grain de sable (FR: #144)
- 2008: Ce que l'on sème / Mamagubida (FR: #153)

=== Singles ===
Year	Single	Peak positions				Album
Year	Single	FRA	BEL (Wa) Ultratop	BEL (Wa) Ultratip	SWI	Album
2005	"L'hymne de nos campagnes"	21	–	–	–	De Bouches à Oreilles
2007	"Désolé pour hier soir"	6	–	–	57	
2008	"Toi et moi"	–	–	2	–	Ce que l'on sème
2012	"Greenwashing"	92	–	37	–	Ladilafé
2012	"Ladilafé"	–	–	12	–	Ladilafé
2016	"Chanter"	–	–	–	–	Vent debout
2019	"L'hymne de nos campagnes 2019"	183	–	8* (Ultratip)	–	XXV ans
2020	"Désolé pour hier soir XXV (Remix 2020)" (feat. McFly & Carlito)	196	–	–	–	XXV ans
2020	"Serre moi 2020" (feat. Yannick Noah & Ibrahim Maalouf)	–	–	45* (Ultratip)	–	

*Did not appear in the official Belgian Ultratop 50 charts, but rather in the bubbling under Ultratip charts.

=== Featured in ===
Year	Single	Peak positions	Album
Year	Single	FRA	Album
2018	"Ferme les yeux" (Bigflo & Oli feat. Tryo)	148	

=== DVDs ===
- 2002: Tryo et les Arrosés: Reggae à coups d'cirque
- 2005: Tryo au cabaret sauvage
- 2006: Tryo fête ses 10 ans...
- 2009: Sous les étoiles

== See also ==
- Trio
- Sinsemilia
- La Rue Kétanou
- Noir Désir
- Les Wriggles
- Les Ogres de Barback
