= Salvador Chuliá Hernández =

Spanish composer and conductor (1944–2025)

Salvador Chuliá
- Chuliá c. 2015
- Born: 19 May 1944; Catarroja, Valencia, Spain
- Died: 5 August 2025 (aged 81)
- Occupations: Conductor; Composer; Academic teacher; Conservatoire director; Writer
- Organizations: Conservatorio Municipal "José Iturbi" de Valencia; Academia de las Artes y las Ciencias de la Música de España
- Spouse: María del Carmen
- Children: 3

Salvador Chuliá Hernández (19 May 1944 – 5 August 2025) was a Spanish composer and conductor. He conducted several bands, composed more than 400 works and served as professor and later director of the Conservatorio Municipal "José Iturbi" de Valencia from 1978 to 2014. He composed music for orchestra such as Díptico sinfónico and Tríptico elegíaco para un percusionista, and for concert bands such as Espíritu valenciano, also chamber music and vocal music. He authored textbooks about harmony and composition.

== Life and career ==
Chuliá was born in Catarroja, Valencia, on 19 May 1944. Chuliá was married to María del Carmen; they had three sons who all became musicians. He received initial musical instructions from his uncle, Francisco Chuliá, who was a guitar maker and lute player. He attended the Sociedad Musical L'Artesana de Catarroja. He then studied saxophone, piano, composition and conducting at the Conservatorio de Valencia and the Conservatorio de Murcia, achieving advanced degrees in saxophone, composition and orchestral conducting.

Chuliá was director of the bands of Benifayó, of the Unión Artística Musical de Navajas, the group La Artesana of Catarroja and of the Academia General del Aire in San Javier. He founded and conducted the Grupo de Metales Catedralicios de Valencia, who premiered many of his compositions. He conducted as a guest in halls including the Palau de la Música de València, the Teatro Principal and the Ateneo Mercantil de Valencia, the Auditorio y Palacio de Congresos de Castellón and the Teatro Principal in Alicante, the Teatro Guimerá of Tenerife, the Teatro Fernán Gómez, the Teatro Español and the Teatro Monumental in Madrid, stages in Timmendorfer Strand and Eutin in Germany, and the Salle Gaveau in París.

Chuliá composed more than 400 musical works for orchestra, vocal ensembles and especially for concert bands. Some of his works have become compulsory pieces at competitions such as Ciudad de Torrevieja in 1983, Onda in 1981, Joan Senent Ibáñez in 1977, Villa de Almussafes and Juegos Florales de Paterna in 1974, and some used at the Concurso Internacional de Trompeta in Paris and the Habanera y Canción Polifónica in Torrevieja. Chuliá composed Tríptico elegíaco para un percusionista in 1990 for orchestra, dedicated to the memory of his son, a percussionist who had died in a traffic accident the previous year.

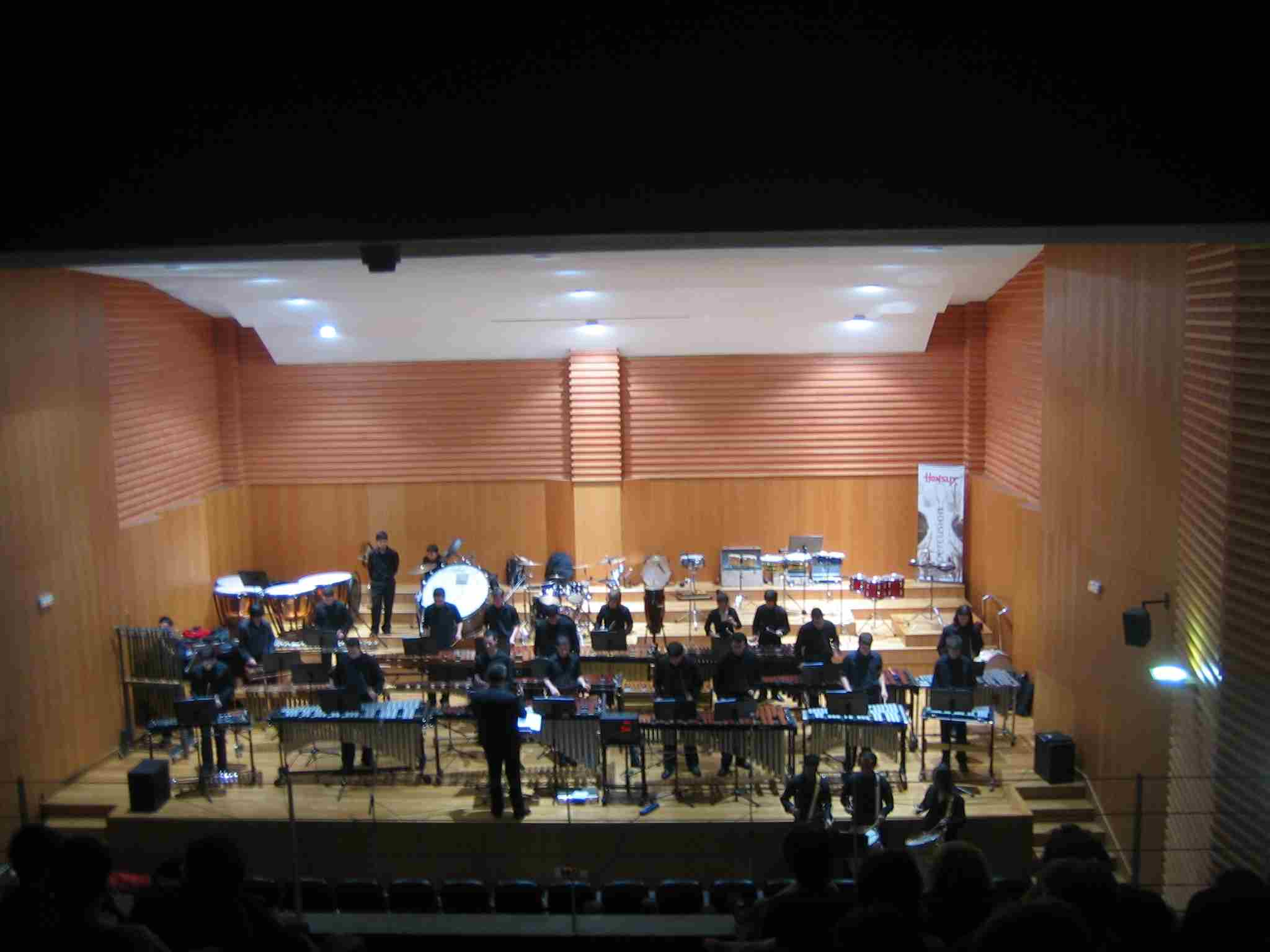
Hall of the municipal conservatory

Chuliá taught as professor of harmony and composition at the Conservatorio de Valencia from 1978, and served as its director from 1992 to his retirement in 2014. One of the halls at the Conservatorio is named Sala Salvador Chuliá in honour of him. He authored several texts of music instruction. He was a founding member of the Academia de las Artes y las Ciencias de la Música de España. He was also president of the Asociación de Compositores Sinfónicos Valencianos (COSICOVA) from 1995 to 2005. He was awarded the 2009 Llíria at the Festival de Bandas. He received the award Lira de Oro from the Sociedad Musical Poblados Marítimos in Valencia in 2010. In 2012 he was elected to the Real Academia de Cultura Valenciana.

Chuliá died on 5 August 2025, at the age of 81.

== Works ==
=== Orchestral ===
- Juan Pablo II for trumpet and orchestra (2011)
- Al maestro Serrano: gran fantasía sinfónica (1974)
- Concerto pour Maurice André (1995), for trumpet and orchestra
- Díptico sinfónico (1987), for band
- Fantasía concertante for trumpet and orchestra (2006), for Concours de Trompette Maurice André
- Naskigo: estampa musical for orchestra (1994)
- Sinfonía Mediterránea (2008), dedicated to Salvador Giner Vidal
- Tríptico elegíaco para un percusionista for orchestra (1990), dedicated to the memory of his son Salvador

=== Chamber music ===
- Adagio sentimental for oboe and piano (1974)
- Amoretes for oboe and piano (1982)
- Conciertos para trompeta y órgano, studies, Jugueteando (2012); Els valencians (2014), Díptic per a Joaquín y Ernesto (2014), Breve fantasía, DoMiSi, Mosaico valenciano (2014), Introducción y polca (1992), Els educandos
- Euterpe for piano (1982)
- Festival for trumpet and organ (1988)
- Homenaje a José Iturbi, fantasia for piano (1995)
- Homenaje a mi padre for ensemble (2014)
- Moviments per a piano (1990)

=== Vocal music ===
- Bautismos que no bautizan (1993)
- Duerme mi niño (Canción de cuna) for soprano and piano (1993)
- Petenera andaluza, after a poem by Federico García Lorca

=== Works for wind band ===
- Episodios sinfónicos (1988)
  - Canción de cuna
  - Destellos
  - Jota
- Espíritu valenciano, symponic suite (1977)
- Moviments cíclics per a banda (1981)
- Sinfonía Valentina (2005), for Certámen Internacional de Valencia
- Suite migratoria (2008), for the Concurso de bandas de música de la Comunidad Valenciana de Cheste
- Tres secuencias sinfónicas (2005), for the Concurso de bandas de música de la Comunidad Valenciana, Cheste 2005

=== Writings ===
- Apuntes de Armonía. Vol. Primera parte: teoría y práctica (2nd ed.). Valencia: Piles. 2003. ISBN 978-8-49-502662-0.
- Apuntes de Armonía. Vol. Segunda parte: teoría y práctica. Valencia: Piles. 2002. ISBN 978-8-49-502667-5.
- Apuntes de Armonía. Vol. Tercera parte: teoría y práctica. Valencia: Piles. 2006. ISBN 978-84-95026-92-7.
- Lecturas. Repentización y transposición – 125 títulos – teoría y práctica. Valencia: Piles. 1991. ISBN 978-84-17195-67-0. OCLC 435943499.
- "La música de cámara y su entorno". Anals de la Real Acadèmia de Cultura Valenciana (in Spanish) (74). Royal Academy of Valencian Culture: 123–130. 1999. ISSN 1130-426X – via dialnet.unirioja.es.
- Pons Server, Juan; Chuliá, Salvador; Climent Barber, Josep; Climent, José; Roncero, Vicente (2013). Solfeo manuscrito. Valencia: Piles. ISBN 978-8-48-854869-6. OCLC 871801150.
