= Grain de Sable =

Studio album by Tryo
- Released: June 2, 2003
- Genre: Reggae
- Length: 52:58
- Label: Yelen

Tryo chronology
Faut Qu'ils S'activent (2000)	Grain de Sable (2003)	De Bouches à Oreilles (2004)

Grain de sable (Grain of Sand) is the third album by Tryo, released in June 2003. Originally, the album was to include a song titled "COGEMA", but it was ultimately removed. This song appears on the live CD De Bouches à Oreilles under the name "co j'ai marre" and also features a video on the DVD Tryo au Cabaret Sauvage.

This album got the Group Award at the Grand Prix du Disque for French Song in 2004.

== Track listing ==
1. "G8" - 2:51
2. "Sortez-les" - 3:46
3. "Comme les journées sont longues" - 3:24
4. "Pompafric" - 3:48
5. "Si la vie m'a mis là" - 5:36
6. "Dans les nuages" - 4:17
7. "Monsieur Bibendum" - 2:42
8. "Serre moi" - 3:46
9. "Ta réalité" - 3:47
10. "Récréation" - 3:24
11. "Ballade en forêt" -4:06
12. "Désolé pour hier soir" - 3:39
13. "Pas pareil" - 3:37
14. "Apocalypticodramatic" - 3:46
15. "J'ai un but" - 3:49

== Credits ==
- Manu (Vocals, guitar)
- Guizmo (Vocals, guitar)
- Mali (Vocals, guitar)
- Daniel (percussion)
