= Tirio =

Tirio may refer to:

- Tirió people, an ethnic group of the Amazon
- Tirió language, a language of Brazil and Suriname
- Tirio language (New Guinea), a language of Papua
- Tirio languages, a family of Trans–New Guinea languages
- Dave Tirio, American musician
