= Conservatorio Municipal "José Iturbi" de Valencia =

Music college in Valencia, Spain

Coordinates: 39.4617°N 0.3522°W

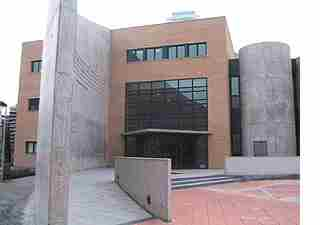
Conservatorio José Iturbi

The Conservatorio Municipal "José Iturbi" de Valencia is a music college in Valencia, Spain. The school has its roots in an 1869 initiative which provided organized musical education in the city of Valencia for the first time; with teachers providing instruction in their own homes rather than at a particular facility. These teachers eventually formed the school's first faculty when the conservatory opened its doors in 1879 as the "Conservatorio Municipal de Valencia". The school changed to its present name in 1979 in honor of the conductor and pianist José Iturbi. The director is Ignacio Millán Santandreu.
