= Tri =

Tri- is a numerical prefix meaning three. Tri or TRI may also refer to:

== Places ==
- Tri-Cities Regional Airport, Tennessee, US, IATA code TRI
- Triangulum constellation, astronomical abbreviation Tri
- Trinidad and Tobago, UNDP country code TRI

== People ==
- Tri, Former nickname for wrestler Triple H
- Try Sutrisno, Vice President of Indonesia (1993–1998)
- Tri Rismaharini, Indonesian politician, Minister for Social Welfare (2020–)
- Tri Hartanto, Indonesian basketball player

== Arts, entertainment, and media ==
- Tri (album), by Ana Stanić
- Tri (novel), a Slovenian novel
- El Tri, Mexican rock group
- Tri (film), a 1965 Yugoslav film directed by Aleksandar Petrović

== Organizations ==
- Taipei Ricci Institute, an educational institute in Taiwan
- Tamalpais Research Institute, a virtual music venue, San Rafael, California, US
- Translational Research Institute (Australia)
- Transport Research Institute, in Scotland

== Other uses ==
- AC Tripoli, a Lebanese association football club
- Total return index
- Toxics Release Inventory, US
- El Tri or El Tricolor, nicknames of the Mexico national football team
- Triangular function, tri(t)
- Trichloroethylene
- Triple reuptake inhibitors
- Trisakti University, an Indonesian campus based on Jakarta
