= Tríptico elegíaco para un percusionista =

1990 composition for percussion and orchestra

Tríptico elegíaco
- by Salvador Chuliá
- Full title: Tríptico elegíaco para un percusionista
- Composed: 1990
- Dedication: memory of Salvador Chuliá jr.
- Movements: 3
- Scoring: orchestra

Tríptico elegíaco (Elegiac Triptych) is a composition for orchestra in three movements by Salvador Chuliá, written in 1990 in memory of his son Salvador. The full title is Tríptico elegíaco para un percusionista (Elegiac triptych for a percussionist).

== History ==
Chuliá was a composer and conductor who served as professor of harmony and composition at the Conservatorio Municipal "José Iturbi" de Valencia from 1978. He and his wife María del Carmen had three sons who all became musicians. His eldest son, Salvador Antonio Chuliá Ramiro, pursued a career as a percussionist, also studying piano, harmony and counterpoint. His brother Vicente described him as "probably the greatest talent in the family" and an "exceptional percussionist". He played with the Spanish National Youth Orchestra and received a scholarship to study at the Hochschule für Musik Würzburg with Siegfried Fink. In 1989 he applied for a position as percussionist with the Spanish National Orchestra, then conducted by Edmon Colomer. He died in a traffic accident that year.

Vicente Chuliá noted that his father "translated his great pain into musical allegories", composing Tríptico elegíaco por un percusionista in 1990, an orchestral piece in three movements dedicated to the memory of his son. It was premiered by the Spanish National Youth Orchestra conducted by Colomer. The piece was recorded for the Institut Valencià de la Música as part of a collection of Chuliá's works entitled Maurice André interpreta a Salvador Chuliá. The performers included Maurice André, Ernesto Chuliá and Nicolás André (trumpet) and the Orquesta Ciutat de Torrent, conducted by Vicente Chuliá. The piece was performed by the Valencia Orchestra during a 2014 summer festival dedicated to the works by Chulià.

== Structure ==
The composition is structured in three movements:

1. Añoranza (Year)
2. ¿Dónde está aquél hijo? (Where is that son?)
3. Desesperación...paz (Despair... Peace)
