= Theophilus London discography =

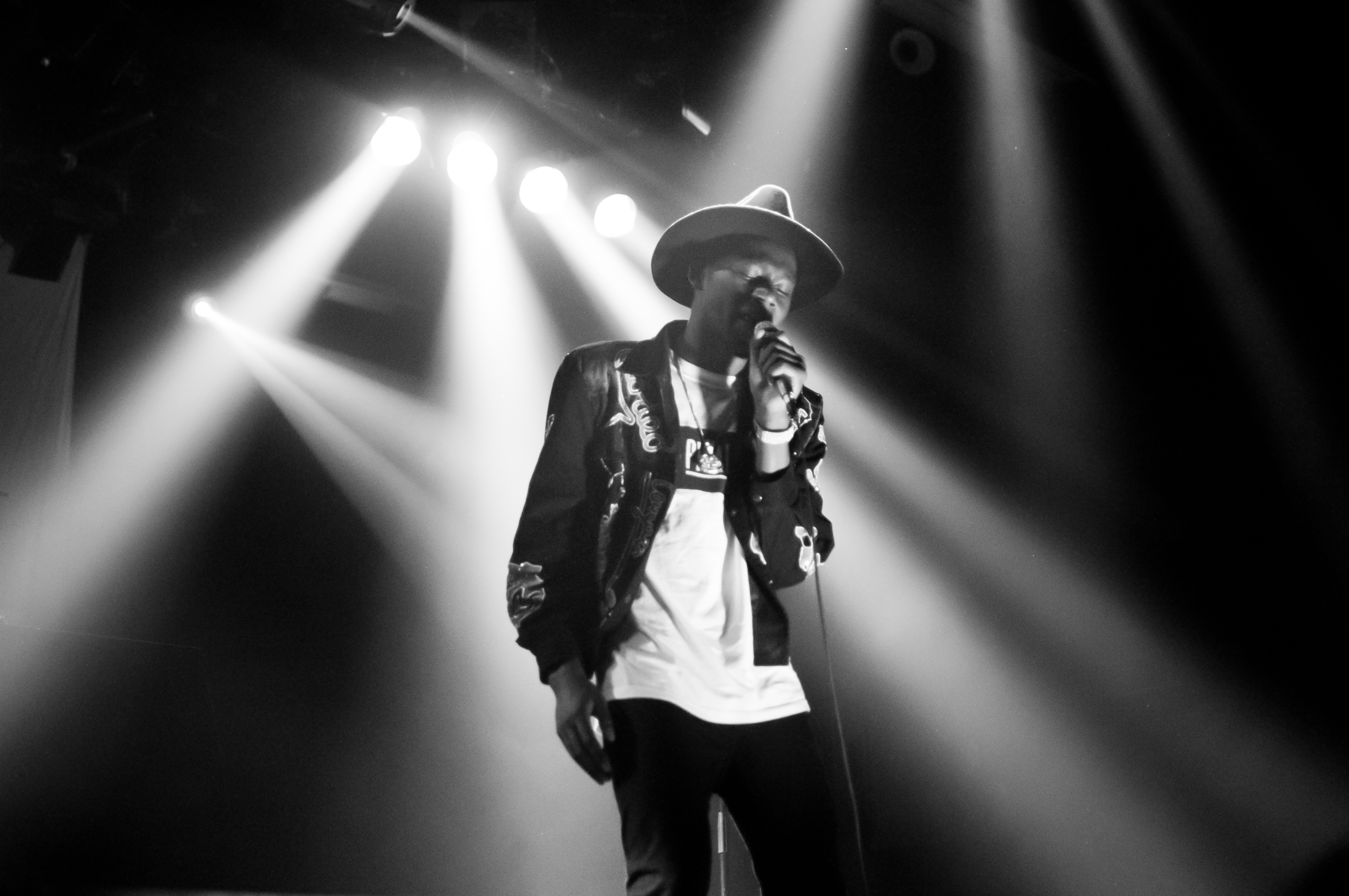
- London performing in 2010
- Studio albums: 3
- EPs: 3
- Singles: 10
- Mixtapes: 3

The discography of Theophilus London, an American rapper and singer, consists of three studio albums, three mixtapes, three extended plays, ten singles, and several collaborations and compilation appearances.

== Albums ==
=== Studio albums ===
List of studio albums
Title	Album details
Timez Are Weird These Days	Released: July 19, 2011; Label: Reprise, Warner; Format: LP, CD, digital download
Vibes	Released: November 4, 2014; Label: Warner; Format: LP, CD, digital download
Bebey	Released: January 17, 2020; Label: My Bebey Records, Indie-Pop; Format: LP, digital download
TL	Released: June 23, 2023; Label: Purple Money Records; Format: LP, digital download

=== Mixtapes ===
List of mixtapes
Title	Album details
JAM!	Released: 2008; Label: Self-released; Format: Digital download
This Charming Mixtape	Released: January 23, 2009; Label: Self-released; Format: Digital download
I Want You	Released: April 28, 2010; Label: Self-released; Format: Digital download
Rose Island Vol. 1	Released: July 3, 2012; Label: Self-released; Format: Digital download
Nights B4 Bebey	Released: July 27, 2018; Label: Self-released; Format: Digital download

=== Remix albums ===
List of mixtapes
Title	Album details
Timez Are Weird These Nights	Released: April 20, 2012; Label: Reprise; Formats: CD, digital download

== Extended plays ==
List of extended plays
Title	Album details
Lovers Holiday	Released: February 8, 2011; Label: Warner; Format: CD, digital download
Lovers Holiday II	Released: February 13, 2014; Label: Self-released; Format: Digital download
Lovers Holiday III	Released: March 8, 2019; Label: My Bebey Records, Indie-Pop; Format: Digital download

== Singles ==
=== As lead artist ===
List of singles showing year released and album name
Title	Year	Album
"Humdrum Town"	2009	This Charming Mixtape
"Flying Overseas"	2010	I Want You and Lovers Holiday
"I Stand Alone"	2011	Timez Are Weird These Days
"Big Spender" (featuring A$AP Rocky)	2012	Non-album single
"Rio" (featuring Menahan Street Band)	2013	Non-album single
"Bebey"	2018	Bebey
"Only You" (featuring Tame Impala)	2018	Bebey
"Whiplash" (featuring Tame Impala)	2019	Bebey
"Pretty" (featuring Ian Isaiah)	2019	Bebey
"Cuba"	2019	Bebey

=== As featured artist ===
List of singles showing year released and album name
Title	Year	Album
"Late Night Operation" (Machinedrum featuring Theophilus London)	2009	Want To 1 2?
"She Said OK" (Big Boi featuring Theophilus London and Tre Luce)	2012	Vicious Lies and Dangerous Rumors
"All the Girls (Around the World)" (The Bloody Beetroots featuring Theophilus London)	2013	Hide
"All Day" (Kanye West featuring Theophilus London, Allan Kingdom, and Paul McCartney)	2015	Non-album single
"Keep On Moving" (Louis the Child and Nez featuring Theophilus London)	2020	Euphoria

== Guest appearances ==
Title	Year	Artist(s)	Album
"Rest of Em"	2008	Mickey Factz	The Leak Vol. 1: The Understanding
"Connected"	2008	Jesse Boykins III, Keys	The Beauty Created
"Negative Thinking"	2010	Ninjasonik, The Death Set, Hollywood Holt, Cadence Weapon	USBD
"Groove Me"	2010	Maximum Balloon	Maximum Balloon
"She is Forever"	2010	MeLo-X, Jesse Boykins III	More Merch
"Starry Eyed" (Penguin Prison Remix)	2011	Ellie Goulding	Starry Eyed (Remixes)
"Best of the Best"	2012	Vinny Chase	Survival of the Swag
"Nebe Miri"	2012	Amadou & Mariam	Folila
"Why Even Try (RAC Mix)"	2012	RAC	Chapter One
"She Said OK"	2012	Big Boi, Tre Luce	Vicious Lies and Dangerous Rumors
"Dance on the Moon"	2013	Travis Scott, Paul Wall	Owl Pharaoh
"All the Girls (Around the World)"	2013	The Bloody Beetroots	Hide
"JFK"	2014	Azealia Banks	Broke with Expensive Taste
Jump (Club Cheval Rap Remix)	2014	Rihanna	
"Talk About It"	2019	Giggs, Kristian Hamilton	Big Bad...
"Feel It"	2019	Octavian	Endorphins

== Soundtracks ==
- "Neighbors" - The Twilight Saga: Breaking Dawn – Part 1 (2011)
- "All Around the World" - Madden NFL 12 (2012)
- "Girls Girls $" - Neighbors (2014)
