= Myd (musician) =

French DJ (born 1987)

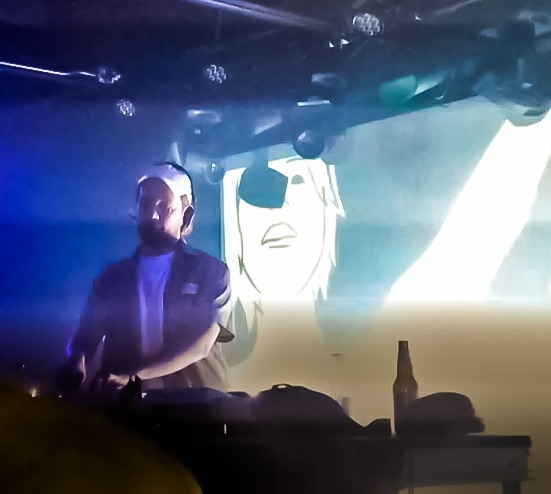
- Myd at the Fairmount Theatre in 2018

Background information
- Born: Quentin Lepoutre; 30 March 1987 (age 39); Croix, Hauts-de-France, France
- Genres: House; indie pop; nu-disco; techno; R&B
- Occupations: Record producer; composer; musician; singer; DJ
- Labels: Ed Banger; Because; Bromance; Warner; Marble

Quentin Lepoutre (French pronunciation: [kɑ̃tɛ̃ ləputʁ]; born 30 March 1987), known professionally as Myd (French: [miːd]), is a French musician, record producer, singer, sound engineer and DJ. He is one of the four members of the electronic band Club Cheval. After releasing tracks on labels Marble and Bromance, he continued his solo career and signed to Ed Banger Records in 2017. He has produced tracks for artists like Brodinski and French rappers such as SCH, Lacrim, Georgio and Alonzo.

== Career ==
Myd studied sound engineering from 2008 to 2011 in Paris at the prestigious cinema school La Fémis when he met Panteros666, Sam Tiba and Canblaster. They decided to make music together and they became Club Cheval.

Alongside the band, in 2011, Myd released his first solo EP on Marble Records (Para One, Surkin and Bobmo label) and started to tour as a DJ internationally. At that time he did remixes for big names like Yelle or Two Door Cinema Club.

In 2014, he co-composed entirely with Brodinski and Kore, Brodinski's first album Brava including featurings with Slim Thug, ILOVEMAKONNEN and Young Scooter. The same year, he moved to Kore's studios in Paris from who he became closer.

In 2015, he co-composed French rap hits with Kore for SCH, Lacrim or Alonzo. He received in 2016 his first platinum disc. At that time he released his house influenced EP, Número Uno on Bromance Records, Brodinski's label.

In 2016, Club Cheval released their debut album titled Discipline. After the album's release, all of the band members continued their solo careers and Club Cheval was put on hiatus.

In 2017, he composed the soundtrack for the French drama film Bloody Milk (French title: Petit paysan), directed by Hubert Charuel. For this film, Myd was nominated for the 43rd César Awards in the "Best Original Music" category and he received the "Valois de la musique" at the 10th Angoulême Francophone Film Festival.

The same year, after the defunct of Bromance Records, he became a member of Ed Banger Records. His first release on Ed Banger is an EP, consisting of 3 tracks, called All Inclusive. The release of the EP is accompanied by a video for "All Inclusive", directed by Alice Moitié, as well as a photo album produced by the latter. We see Myd on a cruise ship, in all its forms, which suggests that the clip is a hidden camera.

In 2018, he released the single "Muchas" featuring Cola Boyy. The official video, directed by Alice Moitié, features around thirty false look-alikes of him. The same year, he produced more than half of the songs on the album XX5, by French rapper Georgio.

In 2019, he released an EP, consisting of 3 tracks, titled Superdiscoteca. The same year, he produced the album Flavourite CÂLÂ, by Sônge.

In 2020, during the first lockdown due to the COVID-19 pandemic, he launches a morning show called CoMyd-19 in which he delivers a DJ set and set up a hotline. CoMyd-19 was voted Best Live Stream by Billboard and was renewed for a second season at the end of 2020 during the second lockdown. In June, he released "Together We Stand", which is the lead single for his debut album Born a Loser. On 28 October 2020 he released a second single, "Moving Men", featuring Mac DeMarco. To promote the release of "Moving Men", he toured Paris in a truck with Pedro Winter. On 8 April 2021 he released the final single titled "Let You Speak". The complete album Born a Loser, including collaborations with Juan Wauters and Bakar, released on 30 April 2021 by Ed Banger.

On 29 April 2021 Myd and Radio Nova announced that they had launched a challenge: to create the 15th track of the album Born a Loser in 15 days with the listeners of Radio Nova. For the featuring, listeners chose the French band L'Impératrice who agreed to collaborate with Myd. The track, titled "Loverini", released on 18 June 2021.

== Discography ==
=== Albums ===
Title	Details	Peak chart positions	
Title	Details	FRA	BEL
Born a Loser	Released: 30 April 2021; Label: Ed Banger, Because; Formats: LP, digital download	60	97
Mydnight	Released: 29 August 2025; Label: Ed Banger, Because; Formats: CD, LP, digital download	132	—

=== Extended plays ===
Title	Details
Octodip	Released: 13 June 2011; Label: Marble
Freak Andy	Released: 18 February 2013; Label: Marble
Número Uno	Released: 25 May 2015; Label: Bromance
All Inclusive	Released: 13 October 2017; Labels: Ed Banger, Because
Superdiscoteca	Released: 19 April 2019; Labels: Ed Banger, Because

=== Singles ===
Title	Year	Album
"No Bullshit" featuring Twice and Lil Patt)	2016	Non-album single
"The Sun"	2017	All Inclusive and Born a Loser
"Muchas" (featuring Cola Boyy)	2018	Non-album single
"Together We Stand"	2020	Born a Loser
"Moving Men" (featuring Mac DeMarco)	2020	Born a Loser
"Born a Loser"	2021	Born a Loser
"Let You Speak"	2021	Born a Loser
"Loverini" (featuring L'Impératrice)	2021	Non-album single
"The Sun" (featuring Jawny)	2022	Born a Loser (Deluxe Edition)
"Domino"	2022	Born a Loser (Deluxe Edition)
"I Made It" (with Picard Brothers)	2022	Born a Loser (Deluxe Edition)
"One Thousand Waves" (with Palms Trax)	2024	Non-album single

=== Other appearances ===
Title	Year	Album
"Uberty"	2014	Homieland Vol.1
"Brooklyn" (with Para One)	2014	Homieland Vol.1
"Again"	2016	Homieland Vol.2
"Dreadlock Holiday" (Deezer Exclusive)	2020	Non-album single
"Roses" (Cola Boyy featuring Myd)	2021	Prosthetic Boombox
"Time Time" (Trei Degete; with Squeezie and Kronomuzik)	2021	Non-album single
"Climb On My Shoulders" (with Salvatore Ganacci)	2024	Sometimes I Cry When I'm Alone

=== Songwriting and production credits ===
==== Albums ====
Title	Year	Artist
Brava	2015	Brodinski
Flavourite CÂLÂ	2019	Sônge

==== Tracks ====
Title	Year	Artist	Album
"Gimme Back the Night" (featuring Theophilus London)	2013	Brodinski	Bromance #11 - Single
"Tout le monde veut des lovés"	2014	Lacrim	Corleone
"Bracelet"	2014	Lacrim	Corleone
"Le Loup d'la Street" (featuring Amel Bent)	2014	Lacrim	Corleone
"Champs Elysées"	2015	SCH	A7
"Regarde moi"	2016	Alonzo	Avenue de St Antoine
"On met les voiles"	2016	Alonzo	Avenue de St Antoine
"Elle a"	2018	S.Pri Noir	Masque blanc
"Love"	2018	S.Pri Noir	Masque blanc
"Monstrueuse"	2018	Disiz	Disizilla
"Hier"	2018	Georgio	XX5
"Miroir"	2018	Georgio	XX5
"Dans mon élément" (featuring Isha)	2018	Georgio	XX5
"Coup pour coup"	2018	Georgio	XX5
"Seul"	2018	Georgio	XX5
"Ça bouge pas"	2018	Georgio	XX5
"Barbara" (featuring Vald)	2018	Georgio	XX5
"Haute couture"	2018	Georgio	XX5
"31 janvier" (featuring Victor Solf)	2018	Georgio	XX5
"Les yeux en face des trous"	2018	Georgio	XX5
"L'orage"	2019	Aloïse Sauvage	Jimy
"Influenceurs"	2020	Squeezie	Non-album single
"De quoi tu parles?"	2020	Lujipeka	L.U.J.I.
"Servis" (featuring Gambi)	2020	Squeezie	Oxyz
"Tout"	2020	Squeezie	Oxyz
"Shin Sekai"	2021	Para One	SPECTRE: Machines of Loving Grace
"Track of Time" (featuring Haich Ber Na and Shay Lia)	2021	Busy P	Non-album single
"Le lac"	2022	Vendredi sur Mer	Métamorphose
"Déçue"	2022	Vendredi sur Mer	Métamorphose
"Mâle à l'aise"	2022	Vendredi sur Mer	Métamorphose
"Désabusée" (featuring Sam Tiba)	2022	Vendredi sur Mer	Métamorphose
"Monochrome"	2022	Vendredi sur Mer	Métamorphose
"Breathtaking"	2023	Thom Draft	Breathtaking
"Tense"	2023	Thom Draft	Breathtaking
"Rush"	2023	Thom Draft	Breathtaking

=== Remixes ===
Track	Year	Artist(s)	Title
"Surabaya Girl"	2012	Krazy Baldhead	Myd Remix
"Tiger Rhythm"	2013	Surkin	Myd & Boston Bun Remix
"Rinse & Repeat" (featuring Kah-Lo)	2016	Riton	Brodinski & Myd Remix
"Ibifornia"	2017	Cassius	Myd Remix
"Miss Smith"	2018	Moodoïd	Myd Remix
"The Beast"	2018	UTO	Myd Remix
"Cruel Summer"	2018	Bananarama	Myd Remix (Deezer Exclusive)
"Want U So Bad"	2018	Gilligan Moss	Myd Remix
"Bombs Away"	2019	Charlotte Gainsbourg	Myd Remix
"Xphanie"	2020	Saint DX	Myd Remix
"Whitsand Bay"	2020	Metronomy	Myd Remix
"Le cassoulet"	2020	Salut C'est Cool	Myd Remix
"Tempérament"	2020	Malik Djoudi	Myd Remix
"Lay Your Head on Me" (featuring Marcus Mumford)	2020	Major Lazer	Myd Remix
"All the Love" (featuring James the Prophet)	2020	Von Pourquery	Myd Remix
"Lover 4 Now" (featuring Todd Edwards)	2020	Groove Armada	Myd Remix
"Softstyle"	2020	Wuh Oh	Myd Remix
"Orange Mug"	2020	WONK	Myd Remix
"Lisbon"	2020	Slim & The Beast	Myd Radio Edit
"Sumimasen Chérie"	2020	Victor le Masne	Myd Remix
"Fever"	2021	Dua Lipa, Angèle	Myd Remix
"Primavera"	2021	PPJ / Páula, Povoa & Jerge	Myd Remix
"Straight to the Morning" (featuring Jarvis Cocker)	2021	Hot Chip	Myd Remix
"Strut"	2021	Elohim	Myd Remix
"Lights Up" (featuring Channel Tres)	2021	Flight Facilities	Myd Remix
"My Night" (featuring APRE)	2021	Claptone	Myd Remix
"2016 - My Generation"	2021	Mirwais	Myd Remix
"I Found You" (featuring Benjamin Ingrosso)	2021	Vantage	Myd Remix
"I Can Talk"	2021	Two Door Cinema Club	Myd Remix
"Best of Me"	2021	Picard Brothers	Myd Remix
"16-18 (Why You Lacking Energy?)"	2022	Cassia	Myd Remix
"C'est à qui le tour"	2026	Mylène Farmer	Myd Remix
