= Sobriety (disambiguation) =

Sobriety is the avoidance of alcohol and other drugs. It was one of the seven capital virtues, opposing indulgence.

Sobriety may also refer to:

== Music ==
- Sobriety Records, a record label of English indie rock band Hoggboy
- Sobriety, an album by American rapper LaRussell with noizy (2025)

=== Songs ===
- "Sobriety", by The Dickies from All This and Puppet Stew (2001)
- "Sobriety", by Jesse Boykins III from Dopamine: My Life on My Back (2008)
- "Sobriety" (song), by SZA (2014)
- "Sobriety", by Deniz Reno (2016)
- "Sobriety", by Kaash Paige (2020)
- "Sobriety", by Korea Town Acid from Cosmos (2021)
- "Sobriety, by Jessie Murph (2021)
- "Sobriety", by Blue October from Spinning the Truth Around (Part II) (2023)

== Other uses ==
- The Sobriety (Italian: La Sobrietà; c. 1680), painting by Rinaldo Viseto in the Oratory of San Nicola da Tolentino, Vicenza, Italy

== See also ==
- Sober (disambiguation)
