= Club Cheval =

French electronic group

- Origin: Lille, France
- Genres: House; R&B; techno
- Years active: 2009–present
- Labels: Bromance; Parlophone
- Members: Myd; Panteros666; Canblaster; Sam Tiba

Club Cheval is a French electronic group originating from Lille, consisting of Myd, Sam Tiba, Panteros666 and Canblaster (Quentin Lepoutre, Samuel Tiba, Victor Thieffry-Watel, and Cédric Steffens respectively).

== Biography ==
Club Cheval is a Paris-based collective, or band, consisting of four musicians: Canblaster, Myd, Sam Tiba, and Panteros666, blending various genres such as R&B or house music.

According to Dazed, they chose the name "cheval" ("horse" in French) because "it resonated as something powerful and noble [they] wanted to put forth."

They met in Lille as students, and started their career with two EPs released in 2010 on Bromance Records, a label founded by Brodinski, as well as remixes for Vitalic, Nero, Boys Noize, and The Dø.

Aside from their solo productions, the first single produced by all four Club Cheval members, "Now U Realize", was released in June 2012. It was followed by the Decisions EP featuring "Decisions" and "Vanilla Girl", released in November 2012.

In 2014, the band composed the songs "Can't Stop" (featuring Kanye West) and "Tribe" (featuring Jesse Boykins III), on Theophilus London's second album Vibes.

Club Cheval's debut album was Discipline which was released in early 2016.

The first extract from the record, "From the Basement to the Roof", debuted in March 2015 on BBC Radio One's Annie Mac show. The song is co-produced by French hip-hop producer DJ Kore with vocals from Phlo Finister, an R&B singer from Los Angeles. Club Cheval told US magazine The Fader "she gives the track the mellow and sentimental touch they were looking for". It was later remixed by Los Angeles-based duo Oliver, and MikeQ, a fixture from the Ball Culture scene.

In September 2015, Club Cheval released "Discipline", title-track from the album, with a video directed by J.A.C.K, a French Award-winning duo behind the videos for Christine and The Queens and Madonna's "Living for Love". Taking place in a house party, the "Discipline" video sees the band "soundtracking a massive game of musical chairs".

On February 4, 2016, radio host Zane Lowe premiered a new song, "Young, Rich and Radical" on his Beats1 show. Club Cheval subsequently announced the Discipline album release date for March 4, 2016. In an interview with FACT, Sam Tiba reveals that most of the vocals on the record are performed by the Miami-based artist Rudy, a reference singer for Chris Brown and The Weeknd.

== Discography ==
=== Albums ===
Title	Details
Discipline	Released: 4 March 2016; Label: Parlophone, Warner Music; Formats: CD, LP, digital download

=== Singles ===
Title	Year	Album
"Now U Realize"	2012	Bromance #3
"Decisions"	2012	Bromance #6: Decisions
"Vanilla Girl"	2012	Bromance #6: Decisions
"From the Basement to the Roof"	2015	Discipline
"Discipline"	2015	Discipline
"Young Rich and Radical"	2016	Discipline

=== Songwriting and production discography ===
Title	Year	Artist	Album
"Dance Like Machines"	2012	Brodinski	Bromance #7
"Hypnotize"	2012	Brodinski	Bromance #7
"Can't Stop" (featuring Kanye West)	2014	Theophilus London	Vibes
"Tribe" (featuring Jesse Boykins III)	2014	Theophilus London	Vibes

=== Remixes ===
- "I'll Be That Friend" – Jodie Abacus
- "Keep Your Lips Sealed" (feat. Goldie Slim) – The Dø
- "Won't You (Be There)" – Nero
- "Stamina" – Vitalic
- "Excuse Me" – Boys Noize
- "Big City Knights" – Birdy Nam Nam
- "Pour Your Love" – Benga
- "Never Let Go" – Surkin
- "Ice Cream" – Playdoe, Sibot, Spoek, Chi Chi
