= Phlo Finister =

- Born: July 16, 1992 (age 33)
- Origin: United States
- Occupation: R&B singer-songwriter
- Formerly of: Raider Klan

Iconika, also known as Phlo Finister (born July 16, 1992), is an American R&B singer-songwriter.

== Background ==
Born in Oakland, California, Iconika (born Elijah Finister) is the daughter of a half-Portuguese, half-black mother and raised in her hometown of Oakland up until the age of five, when she moved to Los Angeles with her mother. As a child, Iconika's upbringing was very reserved and traditional. She attended a small private Christian school where her grandfather was a pastor and her grandmother was a local English teacher. She also attended ballet classes at Hawthorn Dance Academy for 12 years. Growing up, Iconika was banned from listening to hip-hop music and discovered her early tastes and passion for music through classical music and gospel music. Ultimately she ended up developing her distinctive vocal style from her time spent as a singer for the choir at her grandfather's church. This exposure to these styles also helped Iconika develop her taste in music, with some of her earliest influences being Jerry Bock, Mozart, and Janis Joplin.

She attended Downtown Magnets High School in Fashion for a single year until her mother relocated to South Central, Los Angeles, and she was enrolled in Crenshaw High School. Speaking of her time at Crenshaw, Finister described it as "very aggressive... Not mixed or diverse cultures like where I had come from. I got bullied in a rougher part of the streets, and it made me a person with a backbone". After getting kicked out for fighting, Finister transferred to Hamilton High School but eventually dropped out altogether.

== Career ==
Whilst developing her own sense of self, Finister found herself working with Def Jam Records in the styling of some of their female proteges in her late teens. Finister met a series of industry professionals and producers (Drake, Charlie Walk, Steve Lindsey, Cameron Strang, Jeff Barry, David Baerwald, and Diane Warren) who would exert influence on her own musical path over the next few years. However, her time working as a stylist for Def Jam was short-lived as she believed lacked the desperation necessary to be successful in the profession. In an interview, Finister elaborated, "I wasn't gonna ruin my self-esteem to make it happen. Struggling with weight loss, and eating disorders. 'Cause you wanna be the best at that stuff. You're willing to do whatever to get that point". Finister then began her infamous mixtape series XXX Trifecta and worked with producers such as Benny Cassette, Andrew Dawson, Travis Scott, Brodinski, 4AD's SpaceGhostPurrp, Club Cheval, and The Weeknd collaborator illangelo.

Moving behind the scenes as a stylist, it was here Finister first discovered her fascination with the youthquake movement. Coined by Diana Vreeland in the sixties to define the explosion of teenage influence in music and fashion. The 'youthquake' influence is evident in Finister's unique style and a particular fascination with Andy Warhol's muse Edie Sedgwick.

== Youthquaker ==
Youthquake is a collaborative project between Phlo Finister and Grammy award-winning producer Illangelo aiming to recapture the 'Youthquake' movement of social disruption in the 1960s, described as a combination of Illangelo's cinematic and textured mix of 90s Trip hop and progressive electronic sounds paired with Finister's provocative lyrics and dreamy melodies.

They released their first single 'Clockwork' on French label Bromance Records in May 2014, followed by releasing the first half of their EP Projections I on BitTorrent as a bundle, including the first 3 tracks from the EP, video clips from a live performance for Red Bull / Vivienne Westwood and a selection of 'behind the scenes polaroid photos of the band.

== Personal life ==
Iconika was a very close friend of the late Peaches Geldof, whom she had previously lived with in London.

After Geldof's death, Iconika went on a hiatus and deactivated all her social media accounts. Upon her return, she began making music under the name Iconika rather than Phlo Finister. Her debut mixtape, Indecent Exposure, was released May 29, 2017, under XXX Records, a music label she started at the beginning of the year. She also stated that Indecent Exposure is the first of her three-part trilogy, "XXX Trifecta". The second mixtape of the trilogy, X-Rated, was released in August 2021.

On Twitter in April 2019, Iconika revealed that she was back on good terms with her mother, stating, quote, "My mom told me she is proud that I'm choosing to be an independent female black artist".

In April 2020, Iconika announced on Twitter that the delay in releasing her album X-Rated was due to pregnancy resulting in the birth of her son, God.

== Releases ==
=== Singles ===
- D&G (2017)
- Future Motown (2022)

=== EPs ===
- Crown Gold EP (2011)
- Poster Girl EP (2012)
- Indecent Exposure (2016)

=== Mixtapes ===
- Indecent Exposure (2017)
- X RATED (2020)
- XXX (2021)

=== Collaborations ===
- Projections (2014) (with Illangelo, as YouthQuaker)
- Give Me My Flowers (2022) (Clothing collaboration with House of Chaos)
