= Brava (Brodinski album) =

Studio album by Brodinski
- Released: 3 March 2015
- Genre: Hip hop
- Length: 48:16
- Label: Parlophone; Bromance; Warner
- Producer: Brodinski; Myd; Kore

Brava is the debut studio album by French electronic producer Brodinski. It was released through Parlophone, Warner Music and his label Bromance on 3 March 2015.

== Background ==
The album was described as "infused... with all the influences that have fueled him over the years." AllMusic reviewed the album, stating it consists of "a unique voice, one that's choppy, quirky, welcoming, and likely smells of blunts when it burps." PopMatters suggested the album is "a reminder that Brodinski helped plant the seed but is perhaps not the right gardener to help it grow." Billboard called the album a "hazy, seductive blend of trap and techno." while Clash Music asserted the album to be "one of the year's most disposable albums".

Professional ratings
Aggregate scores
Source	Rating
Metacritic	61/100
Review scores
Source	Rating
AllMusic	4/5 stars
PopMatters	4/10 stars
Billboard	4/5 stars
Clash Magazine	4/10 stars

== Track listing ==
Adapted from Apple Music and Qobuz.

All tracks composed by Brodinski, Myd and Kore (credited as Louis Rogé, Quentin Lepoutre and Djamel Fezari respectively) except "Warm Up" co-composed by Ravid Kahalani.

No.	Title	Lyrics	Length
1.	"Can't Help Myself" (featuring SD)	Sadiki Thirston	3:25
2.	"Calculator" (featuring Chill Will)	Willie Fred Pritchard	2:31
3.	"Bury Me" (featuring Maluca & Bricc Baby Shitro)	Natalie Ann Yepez; Mitchell	3:33
4.	"François-Xavier" (featuring Young Scooter)	Kenneth Bailey	3:05
5.	"Warm Up" (featuring Slim Thug)	Ravid Kahalani; Stayve Jerome Thomas	2:59
6.	"Need For Speed" (featuring Louisahhh!!! & Bloody Jay)	Justin Ushery; Louisa Works Pillot	4:38
7.	"Interviews" (featuring I LOVE MAKONNEN & Yung Gleesh)	Asa Asuncion; Makonnen Sheran	4:19
8.	"Hector" (featuring Bricc Baby Shitro)	Mitchell	3:37
9.	"Follow Me (Part 1)" (featuring Georgi Kay & Bloody Jay)	Ushery; Georgina Kingsley	3:22
10.	"Cheddah" (featuring Peewee Longway)	Quincy Lamont Williams	3:28
11.	"51 Bandz" (featuring 2$ Fabo & Phlo Finister)	Elijah Finister; Lefabian Williams	3:32
12.	"Follow Me (Part 2)" (featuring Chill Will)	Pritchard	2:24
13.	"Us" (featuring Bloody Jay)	Ushery	3:31
14.	"On Me" (featuring Bricc Baby Shitro)	Mitchell	3:48
Total length:			48:16

== Charts ==
Chart (2015)	Peak position
Belgian Albums (Ultratop Flanders)	75
French Albums (SNEP)	84
