= Jodie Abacus =

British musician

- Origin: Lewisham, South East London
- Genres: R&B, soul, electronic, funk
- Years active: 2015-present
- Labels: Ministry of Sound, Household Records, RCA
- Website: www.jodieabacus.co.uk

Jodie Abacus is an English musician from Lewisham in South East London. His musical styles include R&B, soul, electronic and funk.

== Career ==
Jodie wrote "I’ll Be That Friend" in 2013 and uploaded it to his SoundCloud channel where it topped the Hype Machine charts and amassed over 100,000 plays. It was written while Jodie was in a dark point in his life, having caught life-threatening pneumonia and broken up with his long-term girlfriend at the same time. He subsequently signed a five-single deal with Household Records / Ministry Of Sound in early 2015.

Follow-up single "Good Feeling" was premiered by MistaJam on BBC Radio 1Xtra on 28 July 2015 and released on the same day. It was named Best of British Record of the Week on the BBC Radio 1Xtra Breakfast Show. It also received plays from Clara Amfo and DJ Target on BBC Radio 1, Tom Ravenscroft on BBC Radio 6 Music, and Trevor Nelson on BBC Radio 2.

His debut EP, titled "For Real Life And Not Pretend", was released on 26 February 2016. The single "She’s In Love With The Weekend" was released on 11 April 2016 and made it to the A-List on BBC Radio 2

Abacus supported Jamie Woon on his European tour in April 2016 and Laura Mvula on three dates of her UK tour in May 2016. He followed these with a run of UK summer festivals including Glastonbury, Lovebox, Parklife, The Great Escape, V Festival, Secret Garden Party, and Y Not. His performance at The Great Escape was filmed by Vevo for their Vevo DSCVR series. He also performed at the main stage of the 9th Annual Roots Picnic in Philadelphia, opening for The Roots, Usher, and Anderson Paak.

The video for "I’ll Be That Friend" was released on 6 July 2016. It was shot in Los Angeles and was inspired by the video "People React To Being Called Beautiful" by Shea Glover Films.

On 4 September 2016, Jodie Abacus was the musical guest on the Channel 4 show Sunday Brunch. He supported Corinne Bailey Rae on her UK tour in October/November 2016. He recorded a live session for YouTube Music Foundry, where he performed "Keep Your Head Down", inspired by the Syrian refugee crisis. The song was released as a single on 9 December 2016.

== Discography ==
=== Albums ===
Year	Title	Released
2018	Take This and Grow Flowers	26 October 2018

=== Extended plays ===
Year	Title	Format	Released	Tracks	Label
2016	For Real Life and Not Pretend	Digital	26 February 2016	"I'll Be That Friend" (radio edit) "Hot Kitchen" "Good Feeling" (edit) "Halfway to Mexico"	Household Records / Ministry Of Sound Recordings
2016	For Real Life and Not Pretend - The Remixes	Digital	6 May 2016	"I'll Be That Friend - Boston Bun Remix" "I'll Be That Friend - Club cheval Remix" "Hot Kitchen - Armand van Helden Remix" "Hot Kitchen - Après Remix" "Good Feeling - MXXWLL Remix" "Good Feeling - KDA Remix"	Household Records / Ministry Of Sound Recordings
2017	Mild Cartoon Violence	Digital	3 November 2017	"100 Dollars" "Off My Chest" "Meet Me in the Middle" "Another Kiss" "When Sunday Comes"	Ferocious Label Services
2018	Meet Me In The Middle (Remixes)	Digital	16 February 2018	"Meet Me In The Middle (Gil Cang Tough Scout Remix)" "Meet Me In The Middle (NULA Remix)" "Meet Me In The Middle (Shelter Point Remix)" "Meet Me In The Middle (John Donovan Remix)"	Ferocious Label Services
2019	Everything is going to be OK	Digital	25 October 2019	"Mould on the wall" "Crush" "Remember" "Hungry like a puppy" "Hungry like a puppy - Radio edit"	Ferocious Label Services

=== Singles ===
Year	Title	Released	Label
2015	I'll Be That Friend	13 February 2015	Ministry of Sound Recordings
2015	Good Feeling	28 July 2015	Ministry of Sound Recordings
2015	Halfway To Mexico	21 October 2015	Ministry of Sound Recordings
2016	She's in Love with the Weekend	11 April 2016	Ministry of Sound / RCA Records
2016	Keep Your Head Down	9 December 2016	Ministry of Sound / RCA Records
2018	Save The World	2 March 2018	Ferocious Label Services
2018	You're Crazy	20 July 2018	Ferocious Label Services
2018	Skin	17 August 2018	Ferocious Label Services
2018	Hard Work	28 September 2018	Ferocious Label Services
