= Encore Sessions at le Baron =

Encore! Logo

The Encore ! Sessions at le Baron was a music series of performances of popular and indie artists that ran from 2012-2014. It was produced by Alexandre Sap for FORWARD ENTERPRISES at Le Baron Chinatown in New York City.

The concert series was named after the French word "encore", which means "again", and is used to designate an additional performance added to the end of a concert.

In the first series, artists such as Friends, Theophilus London, The Virgins, performed new material in front of a small audience.

On February 21, 2012, London chose this venue to perform Big Spender featuring ASAP Rocky for the first time .

On March 5, 2012, The Virgins chose this venue to debut “Flowers,” “Blue Rose Tattoo” and “Slave To You,” three as-yet unrecorded songs.

Season 2 premiered on December 6, 2012 with three songs from New York electronic pop artist MNDR.

The live sessions are recorded twice a month in high-definition video at Le Baron Chinatown in New York City.
