= Vibes (Theophilus London album) =

Studio album by Theophilus London
- Released: November 4, 2014
- Recorded: 2012–14; BMT Studios, (Palm Springs); Kouz Production, (Paris); New Look, (New York City); Question de Son Studio, (Paris); Peter Fox Studio, Berlin, (Germany)
- Genre: Hip hop; electronic
- Length: 41:53
- Label: Warner Bros.
- Producer: Kanye West (exec.); Leon Ware (also creative); Theophilus London (also creative); Clemens "Cid Rim" Bacher; Pierre Baigorry; Brodinski; Club Cheval; Adam Pavao; 88-Keys

Theophilus London chronology
Timez Are Weird These Days (2011)	Vibes (2014)	Bebey (2020)

Singles from Vibes
- 1. "Tribe" Released: September 2, 2014

Vibes is the second studio album by American rapper Theophilus London. The album was released on November 4, 2014, by Warner Bros. Records. The album features guest appearances from Leon Ware, Kanye West, Jesse Boykins III, Soko, Devonte Hynes and Force MDs. The album was supported by the single "Tribe".

== Background ==
In November 2014, in an interview with Nah Right, he spoke about how long it took to make the album, saying: "Two years. The first six months I would say I started the early production meetings with the people I wanted to work with. This album is like my very first album because nobody from the label or nobody said, “Yo, go write with this person.” This is all pre-thought like, “Who do I want to pick and start the ideas with?” When it comes to making music I'm very timid. I'm not nervous but I'm very timid. I know that I have to do good. Without Kanye's name attached to it, trust me I would have put out a raw as fuck album and people would be like, “Yo let’s go, let’s do this!” That's me, I'm going to build a vibe and go. So the people I got to work with really shaped the album."

London moved to Palm Springs, Florida where he bought an old house and built a studio in it to make the album. After inviting Leon Ware over the two wrote the project in the house for over a year.

He also spoke about Kanye West executive producing the album, saying: "It’s super special. He doesn’t executive produce nobody’s album. He just do features. And in the next few years he’s just focused on Yeezy season and nobody’s going to drop an album when he does [laughs] and I’m going to be super irrelevant. I’m glad my album came out right now and not when his album is about to come out. It’s dope though. It’s like sometimes I want to pinch myself. It’s one of those moments man. It’s like if I were to work with Michael Jackson and shit. I’m happy I get to do business with people, I know people can’t listen to my album in one day and have 700+ replies to me saying, “This is the most incredible album of the year, 10/10.” I get more people excited that one of the highest brow artists and one of the lowest brow artists meet up. People are excited about that, that's dope for me–that Kanye would work with a kid like me, that's a great message."

== Singles ==
On September 2, 2014, the album's first single "Tribe" featuring Jesse Boykins III was released. On November 4, 2014, the music video was released for "Tribe" featuring Jesse Boykins III.

== Critical response ==
Professional ratings
Aggregate scores
Source	Rating
Metacritic	72/100
Review scores
Source	Rating
AllMusic	3/5 stars
Exclaim!	5/10
HipHopDX	4/5 stars
Music Connection	5/10
Now	NNNNN
PopMatters	7/10 discs
XXL	3/5 (L)
Wondering Sound	3/5 stars

Vibes received positive reviews from music critics. At Metacritic, which assigns a normalized rating out of 100 to reviews from critics, the album received an average score of 71, which indicates "generally favorable reviews", based on 6 reviews. Scott Simpson of Exclaim! said, "Does Vibes serve as the great artistic outlet London makes it out to be? No. But what the album does have going for it is its overarching aesthetic: It's an album that has a nice enough groove throughout, and again, the quality of the production really cannot be overstated. Maybe London should have let the album speak for itself." Steven Goldstein of HipHopDX said, "Time off, a tighter central theme and spirited assists from some legendary producers makes Theophilus London’s second full-length his best yet. What’s being escaped is up to you, but Vibes succeeds in getting its listener to flourish in a world of champagne toasts, faceless women and impulsive dancing." Eli Schwadron of XXL stated, "Theophilus London’s musical ability is evident throughout Vibes, a mesh-mash of genres that come together to form one of the better listenings of 2014. The album sounds like a bit of a throwback at times, yet London makes it feel new at the same time. He poses a dual threat—singer/rapper—which results in wider appeal. Vibes is a breath of fresh air."

== Track listing ==
Credits adapted from London's official website.

No.	Title	Writer(s)	Producer(s)	Length
1.	"Water Me" (featuring Leon Ware)	Leon Ware; Theophilus London; The Force MD’s; Soko	Ware; Adam Pavao	5:08
2.	"Neu Law"	London; Andrew Watt; Miri Ben-Ari; John Maus; Pavao	Pavao; London	2:38
3.	"Take and Look"	London; Pavao; Mike Moore; Watt; Alain Seghir; Brigitte Balian; Catherine Loy	Pavao; London	3:10
4.	"Can't Stop" (featuring Kanye West)	London; Kanye West; 88-Keys; Club Cheval; Brodinski; Brittany Barber; Ben-Ari; Norman Feels; James Smith	Club Cheval; Brodinski; 88-Keys^{[a]}	4:51
5.	"Get Me Right"	London; Ware; The Force MD’s; Soko; Pavao; West^{[b]}	Clemens "Cid Rim" Bacher; Pavao	3:14
6.	"Heartbreaker"	London; Sarah Ruba; Pavao	Pavao	2:51
7.	"Do Girls"	London; West; Watt	Cid Rim	3:38
8.	"Tribe" (featuring Jesse Boykins III)	London; Jesse Boykins III; Brodinski; Club Cheval	Club Cheval; Brodinski	2:30
9.	"Smoke (Interlude)" (featuring Soko)	London; Soko; Pavao	Pavao	2:42
10.	"Smoke Dancehall"	London; Soko; Pavao	Pierre Baigorry	3:40
11.	"Need Somebody" (featuring Leon Ware)	London; Ware; Pavao; Moore; Soko; The Force MD’s	Baigorry	3:23
12.	"Figure It Out" (featuring Devonte Hynes and The Force MD's)	London; Devonte Hynes; The Force MD’s; Brodinski; Ruba; Mason Betha; Sean Combs; Curtis Mayfield; Nashiem Myrick; Keisha Spivey	Ware	4:07
Total length:				40:33

Notes

- ^{^[a]} signifies a co-producer.
- ^{^[b]} signifies an arranger.

Sample credits

- "Neu Law" contains a portion of the composition “The Law” written by John Maus as performed by John Maus.
- "Take and Look" contains a portion of the composition “Take a Look” written by Alain Seghir, Brigitte Balian, and Catherine Loy as performed by Martin Dupont.
- "Can't Stop" contains a portion of the composition “You Can't Stop My Love” written by Alain Seghir, Brigitte Balian, and Catherine Loy as performed by Martin Dupont.
- "Figure It Out" contains a portion of the composition “What You Want” written by Mason Betha, Sean Combs, Curtis Mayfield, Nashiem Myrick, and Keisha Spivey as performed by Mase from album Harlem World.

== Personnel ==
Credits are adapted from the album's liner notes.

- Theophilus London — A&R, composer, creative director, creative producer, lyricist, primary artist, producer, vocals
- Kanye West — arranger, composer, executive producer, featured artist
- Leon Ware — composer, creative producer, featured artist, producer
- 88-Keys — composer, producer
- Virgil Abloh — creative director
- Pierre Baigorry — producer
- Brigitte Balian — composer
- Brittany Barber — composer, vocals (background)
- Miri Ben-Ari — composer, string arrangements, strings, violin, violin arrangement
- Mason Betha — composer
- Jesse Boykins III — composer, featured artist
- Brodinski — composer, producer
- Cid Rim — producer
- Club Cheval — composer, producer
- Sean Combs — composer
- Paul Falcone — mixing
- Norman Feels— composer
- Jeff Fenster — A&R
- The Force M.D.'s — composer, featured artist
- Devonté Hynes — composer, featured artist
- Anthony Kilhoffer — mixing
- Karl Lagerfeld — art direction, photography
- Catherine Loy — composer
- John Maus — composer
- Curtis Mayfield — composer
- Jack Minihan — A&R
- Mike Moore — composer
- Nashiem Myrick — composer
- Adam Pavao — composer, producer
- Kyle Ross — mixing assistant
- Sarah Ruba — composer
- Alain Seghir — composer
- James Smith — composer
- Soko — composer, featured artist
- Keisha Spivey — composer
- Andrew Watt — composer
