= Forward Enterprises =

- Industry: Marketing
- Founders: Leslie Dubest, Alexandre Sap, Fabien Moreau

FORWARD is a creative agency founded by former Recall Group and The Hours Entertainment (HAVAS) founders Alexandre Sap, Leslie Dubest and Fabien Moreau.

== Specialty ==
FORWARD is specialized in cultural marketing, brand content, digital and social network activation, public relations and events.

== Offices ==
FORWARD has offices in New York City, Tokyo and Paris.

FORWARD's clients include Pernod-Ricard Group, Harry Winston, Hermes, The Absolut Company, Estee Lauder, Cartier, Pernod Absinthe, and ABSOLUT's Encore Sessions at le Baron.
