= Sober =

Sober usually refers to sobriety, the state of not having any measurable levels or effects from alcohol or drugs.

Sober may also refer to:

== Music ==
- Sôber, Spanish rock band

=== Songs ===
- "Sober" (Bad Wolves song), 2019
- "Sober" (BigBang song), 2016
- "Sober" (Childish Gambino song), 2014
- "Sober" (Demi Lovato song), 2018
- "Sober" (G-Eazy song), 2017
- "Sober" (Hudson Westbrook song), 2025
- "Sober" (Jennifer Paige song), 1999
- "Sober" (Kelly Clarkson song), 2007
- "Sober" (Little Big Town song), 2012
- "Sober" (Lorde song) and "Sober II (Melodrama)", 2017
- "Sober" (Loreen song), 2012
- "Sober" (Pink song), 2008
- "Sober" (Selena Gomez song), 2015
- "Sober" (Tool song), 1993
- "Sober", by Bazzi
- "Sober", by Blink-182 from the 2016 album California
- "Sober", by Cheat Codes
- "Sober", by DJ Snake featuring John Ryan from the 2016 album Encore
- "Sober", by Fidlar from the 2015 album Too
- "Sober", by Hunter Hayes from the 2023 album Red Sky
- "Sober", by Inna
- "Sober", by Jelly Roll from the 2021 album Ballads of the Broken
- "Sober", by Muse from the 1999 album Showbiz
- "Sober", by Nettspend, 2026
- "Sober", by Sam Smith from the 2020 album Love Goes

== People ==
- Bojan Šober (born 1957), Croatian opera singer
- Elliott Sober (born 1947), American philosopher of science

== Places ==
- Sober Hall, village in Ingleby Barwick, England
- Sober Island, Nova Scotia
- Sober, Spain

== Other uses ==
- Sober (worm), a family of computer worms
- "Sober" (Drifters), a 2016 television episode

== See also ==
- Sober space, a property of a topological space in mathematics
- Sobers (surname)
- Sobriety (disambiguation)
