= Sobers (surname) =

Sobers is a surname. Notable people with the surname include:

- Alex Sobers (born 1998), Barbadian swimmer
- Charmie Sobers (born 1973), Dutch retired taekwondo practitioner
- Crystal Sobers (born 1981), Trinidadian football referee
- Garfield Sobers (1936–2026), Barbadian cricketer
- Grantley Sobers (born 1937), Barbadian weightlifter
- Jerrome Sobers (born 1986), English former footballer
- Ricky Sobers (born 1953), American former National Basketball Association player
- Sean Sobers (born 1988), Trinidad and Tobago politician
- Wayne Sobers (born 1969), Barbadian former footballer

== See also ==
- Sober (disambiguation), including people with the surname
