= L'Impératrice =

French pop and disco band

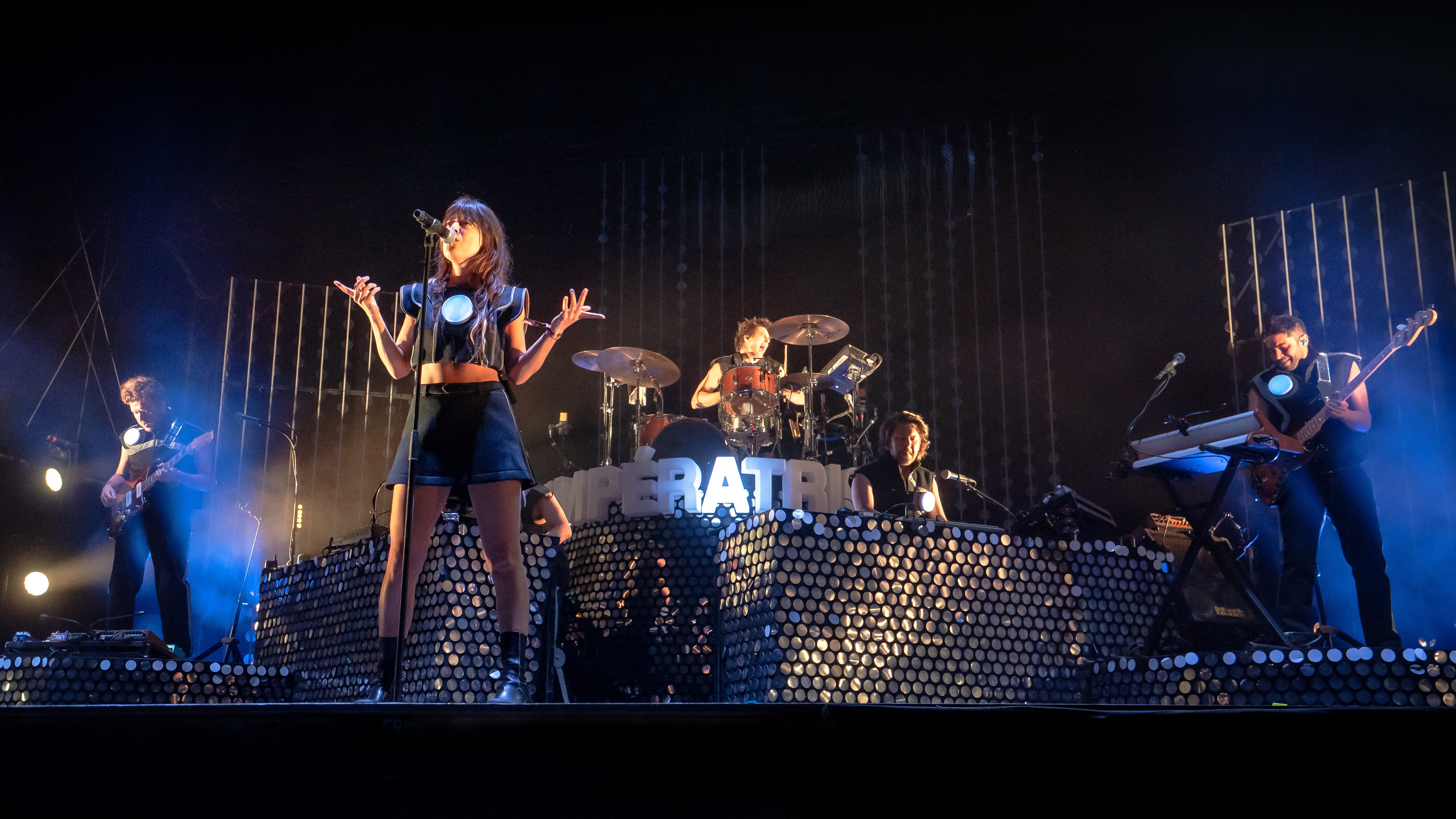
- L'Impératrice in 2025

Background information
- Origin: Paris, France
- Genres: Pop, nu-disco, electronic
- Years active: 2012–present
- Members: Maud Ferron; Charles de Boisseguin; Tom Daveau; David Gaugué; Hagni Gwon; Achille Trocellier
- Past members: Flore Benguigui

L'Impératrice (French pronunciation: [lɛ̃peʁatʁis]; lit. 'The Empress') is a French pop and nu-disco band from Paris, formed in 2012. They are signed to French independent record label microqlima.

Originally founded by keyboardist and primary songwriter, Charles de Boisseguin as a solo project, the project expanded to its initial lineup consisting of keyboardist Hagni Gwon, bassist David Gaugué, guitarist Achille Trocellier, and drummer Tom Daveau as an instrumental act, until the addition of lead vocalist Flore Benguigui to the group in 2015. She made her debut on the group's third EP, Odyssée, which significantly raised the group's profile internationally after its release.

L'Impératrice have released three studio albums to date via microqlima, Matahari (2018), Tako Tsubo (2021), and their most recent, Pulsar released June 7, 2024. A few months after the release of Pulsar, Benguigui announced that she had left L'Impératrice, citing mental health and alleged mistreatment directed towards her by members of the group and their management throughout her time in the project, as being the main reasons for the separation. French musical artist Maud Ferron was revealed as the group's new vocalist soon after Benguigui's departure.

== Career ==
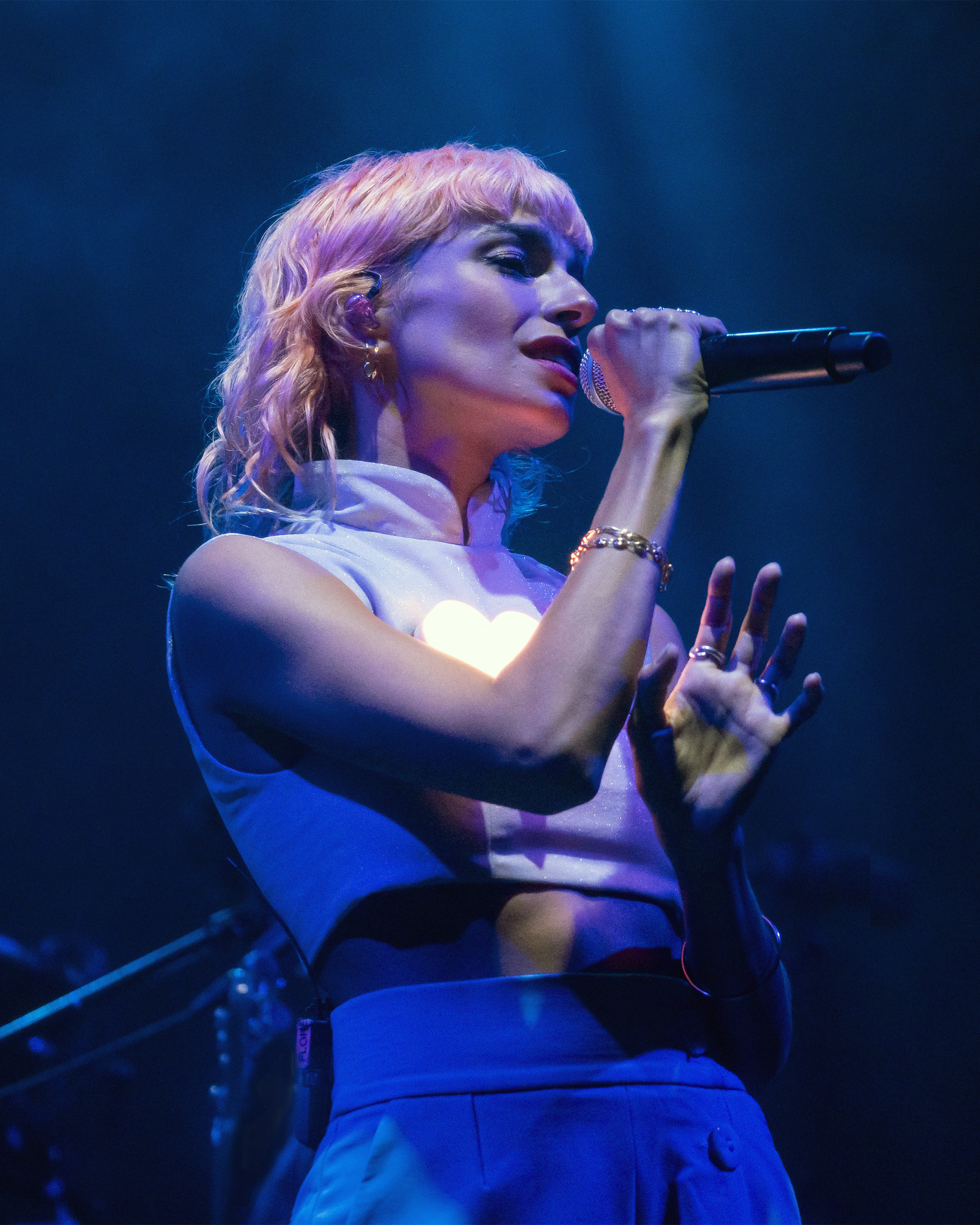
Flore Benguigui at Today's Festival in Turin, Italy, August 2023

L'Impératrice released their first, self-titled EP in 2012, followed by a second (Sonate Pacifique) in 2014, and then a third (Odyssée) in 2015. The latter was re-edited a year later under the name L'Empereur, in a slower version of the original, inspired by a fan's mistake of playing the album at the wrong speed. An acoustic version using violin, cello, and acoustic guitar was also released, in February 2017.

The band received the Deezer Adami Fans' award in 2016. In 2015, a single, "Vanille Fraise," was released based on a sample by the soul singer Anita Ward. The band joined the independent label microqlima, releasing an EP, Séquences, in June 2017. Remixes of its songs, one by Parcels, a group from New South Wales, Australia, were released in September 2017.

On 17 October 2017, the band released "Erreur 404", the first single off their first full-length album, Matahari. L'impératrice appeared on the French television show Quotidien on TMC on 9 January 2018. The band performed at La Cigale on 12 October 2017, and then at the Casino de Paris on 3–4 April 2018. They completed a French tour between February and May 2018, with additional dates between October 2018 and January 2019.

On 21 June 2018, during the Fête de la Musique, the band performed at the French National Assembly. The band released their second album Tako Tsubo in 2021 and their third album Pulsar in 2024. The band played Coachella in Indio, California in April 2022 and 2024. On 26 September 2024, it was announced via Instagram that singer Flore Benguigui would leave the band, citing physical and mental health reasons, as well as "profound personal, artistic and fundamental disagreements between the other members of the band and me." On 1 October 2024, French pop-artist, Maud Ferron (known professionally as Louve) was announced as the group's new singer. Benguigui referenced her departure in an interview with a French independent newspaper, Mediapart, claiming that she was "constantly being controlled, especially by two of the band members and the manager", who humiliated and screamed at her in front of other band members. She said she experienced losing her voice from being mistreated. The rest of the band denied the claims.

== Members ==
=== Current ===
- Maud "Louve" Ferron – lead vocals, synthesizer (2024–present)
- Charles de Boisseguin – piano, keyboards, synths, backing vocals (2012–present)
- Tom Daveau – drums, percussion, sampler, guitar (2012–present)
- David Gaugué – bass guitar, bass synth, guitar, backing vocals (2012–present)
- Hagni Gwon – keyboards, synths, sampler, backing vocals (2012–present)
- Achille Trocellier – electric guitar, backing vocals (2012–present)

=== Former ===
- Flore Benguigui – lead vocals, synth (2015–2024)

== Discography ==
=== Studio albums ===
- Matahari (2018)
- Tako Tsubo (2021)
- Pulsar (2024)

=== EPs ===
- L'Imperatrice (2012)
- Sonate pacifique (2014)
- Odyssée (2015)
- L'Empereur (Odysee Slow Version) (2016)
- Sequences (2017)
- Sequences (Remixes) (2017)
- Dreaming of You (2018)
- Submarine (Remixes) (2021)

=== Singles ===
- "Sonate pacifique" (2014)
- "Vanille fraise" (2015)
- "Erreur 404" (2017)
- "Dreaming of You" (Vibes4YourSoul Remix) (2018)
- "Vacances" (Yuksek Remix) (2018)
- "Histoire d'un soir (Souvenirs d'été)" (2018)
- "Geisha" (2018)
- "Matahari" (Red Axes Remix) (2018)
- "Là-haut" (2018)
- "Stand on the Word" (Le Grand Noël) (2018)
- "Entre-deux" (Onra x Pomrad Remix) (2018)
- "Exit" (2020)
- "Fou" (2020)
- "Voodoo?" (2020)
- "Anomalie bleue" (2020)
- "Peur des filles" (2021)
- "Hématome" (2021)
- "Loverini" (with Myd) (2021)
- "I Wanna Dance with Somebody (Who Loves Me)" (InVersions 80s) (2021)
- "Everything Eventually Ends" (2022)
- "Heartquake" (2023)
- "Me da igual" (2024)
- "Danza Marilù" (2024)
- "Any Way" (featuring Maggie Rogers) (2024)
- "Sweet & Sublime" (featuring Erick the Architect) (2024)
- "Entropia" (2025)

=== Remixes ===
List of remixes
Title	Year	Artist	Album
"Supernova"	2013	Isaac Delusion	
"Children of the Night"	2014	Isaac Delusion	
"Je suis music"	2015	Cerrone	The Remixes
"La piscine"	2016	Hypnolove	La piscine (EP)
"Gamesofluck"	2017	Parcels	Hideout Remixed (EP)
"Hiéroglyphes"	2018	Pépite	Les Bateaux (Remixs) (EP)
"I Feel High"	2021	Poolside	High Season
"Guy"	2021	Remi Wolf	We Love Dogs!

== Awards and nominations ==
=== Berlin Music Video Awards ===
The Berlin Music Video Awards is an international festival that promotes the art of music videos.

Year	Nominated Work	Award	Result	Ref.
2025	Danza Marilù (feat. Fabiana Martone)	Best Animation	Nominated	
