= Canblaster =

French DJ and producer

- Born: Cédric Steffens
- Origin: Douai, France
- Genres: House future bass video game music electronic music
- Years active: 2008–present
- Labels: Nightshifters; Sound Pellegrino; Marble; Pelican Fly

Canblaster is the pseudonym of French DJ and producer Cédric Steffens, and one-fourth of French dance music clique Club Cheval.

Since his first major release in 2010, Steffens has remixed tracks by Erol Alkan, Drop the Lime and Rusko.

== Biography ==
Steffens grew up in Douai, in the North of France. He began his music career as a teenager, by producing tracks for the In The Groove video game series.

Steffens' breakthrough as a dance music producer came through with his first release called "Jetpack". Jetpack was heavily supported by British DJ Sinden, of whom Steffens would later go to remix.

His second EP, "Master of Complication", was released on Nightshifters in 2011, with a third EP - "Totem" - on Marble.

Two Years later, in 2013, his fourth EP called "Infinite" was released on Marble.

In April 2015, he collaborated with Lido to produce a six track EP called "Superspeed" that was released on Pelican Fly.

In October 2015, he released the Continue? EP on Pelican Fly as well.

== Discography ==
=== Originals ===
- Continue? (2015, Pelican Fly)
- Superspeed (2015, Pelican Fly) with Lido
- Jetpack (2010, Sounds of Sumo)
- Master of Complication (2011, Nightshifters)
- Totem (2011, Marble)
- Infinite (2013, Marble)

=== Remixes ===
- Charli XCX - Superlove (Atlantic)
- Crystal Fighters - In The Summer (Zirkulo)
- Wolf In a Spacesuit - Wake The Shadow (unsigned)
- Audrey Katz - Drugs (Leonizer)
- Lorenzo Vektor - Turn It Up (Silverback)
- Spoek Mathambo - Mshini Wam (BBE)
- Wafa - Popup (Grizzly)
- Myd - Train to Bamako (Club Cheval)
- Dooze Jackers - We Love Moogie (DANR)
- Style of Eye & Slagsmålsklubben : Homeless (Fool's Gold)
- Drop the Lime - Hot as Hell (Trouble & Bass / Ministry of Sound)
- Yeahwoho - Pushit (Top Billin)
- Teki Latex - Dinosaurs With Guns (Sound Pellegrino)
- O.Children - Fault (Deadly People)
- Imperial Tiger Orchestra : Djemeregne (Mental Groove)
- Twist-it - Funky Monkey (No Brainer)
- French Fries – Charlotte (Young Gunz)
- The Count & Sinden – Future (Domino)
- Funkin Matt & Teki Latex – Get Loose
- Erol Alkan & Boys Noize - Avalanche (Terminal Velocity) feat. Jarvis Cocker (Phantasy)
- Rusko - Feels so Real (Mad Decent)
- Johnny Moog - Dope Love (Palms Out Sounds)
- Birdy Nam Nam – Big City Knights (Club Cheval Remix)

== Known Pseudonyms (for Rhythm Games) ==
- Canblaster (Original style)
- Diclonius Kid (Hardcore songs)
- Nightmare (Digital Hardcore songs)
- Hi-G (Tribal / Ethnic songs)
- V-Band Selecta (Jazz)
- Nu-Prophet (Breakbeat)
- Select Club (House)
- Jack-In-The-Box
- Sampling Masters CHANG
- Dr. Tanner
