= Timez Are Weird These Days =

Studio album by Theophilus London
- Released: July 19, 2011
- Recorded: 2010–11
- Genre: Hip-hop
- Length: 36:58
- Label: Reprise
- Producer: Ariel Rechtshaid; Dave Sitek; Joakim Åhlund; John Hill

Theophilus London chronology
Timez Are Weird These Days (2011)	Vibes! (2014)

Singles from Timez Are Weird These Days
- 1. "Last Name London" Released: June 27, 2011

Timez Are Weird These Days is the debut studio album by the American rapper Theophilus London. It was released on July 19, 2011, via Reprise Records. Produced by Joakim Åhlund, Ariel Rechtshaid, Dave Sitek and John Hill, it features guest appearances from Holly Miranda and Sara Quin. The album peaked at number 168 on the Top Current Album Sales, number 30 on the Top R&B/Hip-Hop Albums and number 21 on the Top Rap Albums charts in the United States. The album's cover artwork is a reference to Leon Ware's eponymous 1982 album.

== Critical reception ==
Professional ratings
Aggregate scores
Source	Rating
AnyDecentMusic?	5.8/10
Metacritic	61/100
Review scores
Source	Rating
AllMusic	2/5 stars
Consequence of Sound	C+
Drowned in Sound	4/10
IGN	8.5/10
Now	3/5 Ns
Rolling Stone	3/5 stars
Slant	3.5/5 stars
Spin	5/10 marks
The A.V. Club	C+
The Guardian	2/5 stars

Timez Are Weird These Days was met with generally favorable reviews from music critics. At Metacritic, which assigns a normalized rating out of 100 to reviews from mainstream publications, the album received an average score of 61 based on twenty reviews. The aggregator AnyDecentMusic? has the critical consensus of the album at a 5.8 out of 10, based on eleven reviews.

== Track listing ==
No.	Title	Writer(s)	Producer(s)	Length
1.	"Last Name London"	Theophilus London; John Graham Hill; Jahan Zeb Malik	John Hill	3:46
2.	"Love Is Real" (featuring Holly Miranda)	London; Hill	John Hill	3:45
3.	"Wine and Chocolates"	London; David Andrew Sitek; Jaleel Bunton	Dave Sitek	3:42
4.	"All Around the World"	London; Joakim Åhlund	Jocko	3:47
5.	"She's Great" (Interlude)			0:05
6.	"Why Even Try" (featuring Sara Quin)	London; Sara Quin; Ariel Rechtshaid; Justin Raisen	Ariel Rechtshaid	4:20
7.	"Stop It"	London; Rechtshaid; Edwin Birdsong	Ariel Rechtshaid	3:05
8.	"Girls Girls $"	London; Åhlund	Jocko	3:10
9.	"One Last Time"	London; Åhlund	Jocko	4:24
10.	"Lighthouse"	London; Sitek	Dave Sitek	3:32
11.	"I Stand Alone"	London; Åhlund	Jocko	3:22
Total length:				36:58

== Charts ==
Chart (2011)	Peak position
US Top Current Album Sales (Billboard)	168
US Top R&B/Hip-Hop Albums (Billboard)	30
US Top Rap Albums (Billboard)	21
