= Jesse Boykins III =

American singer

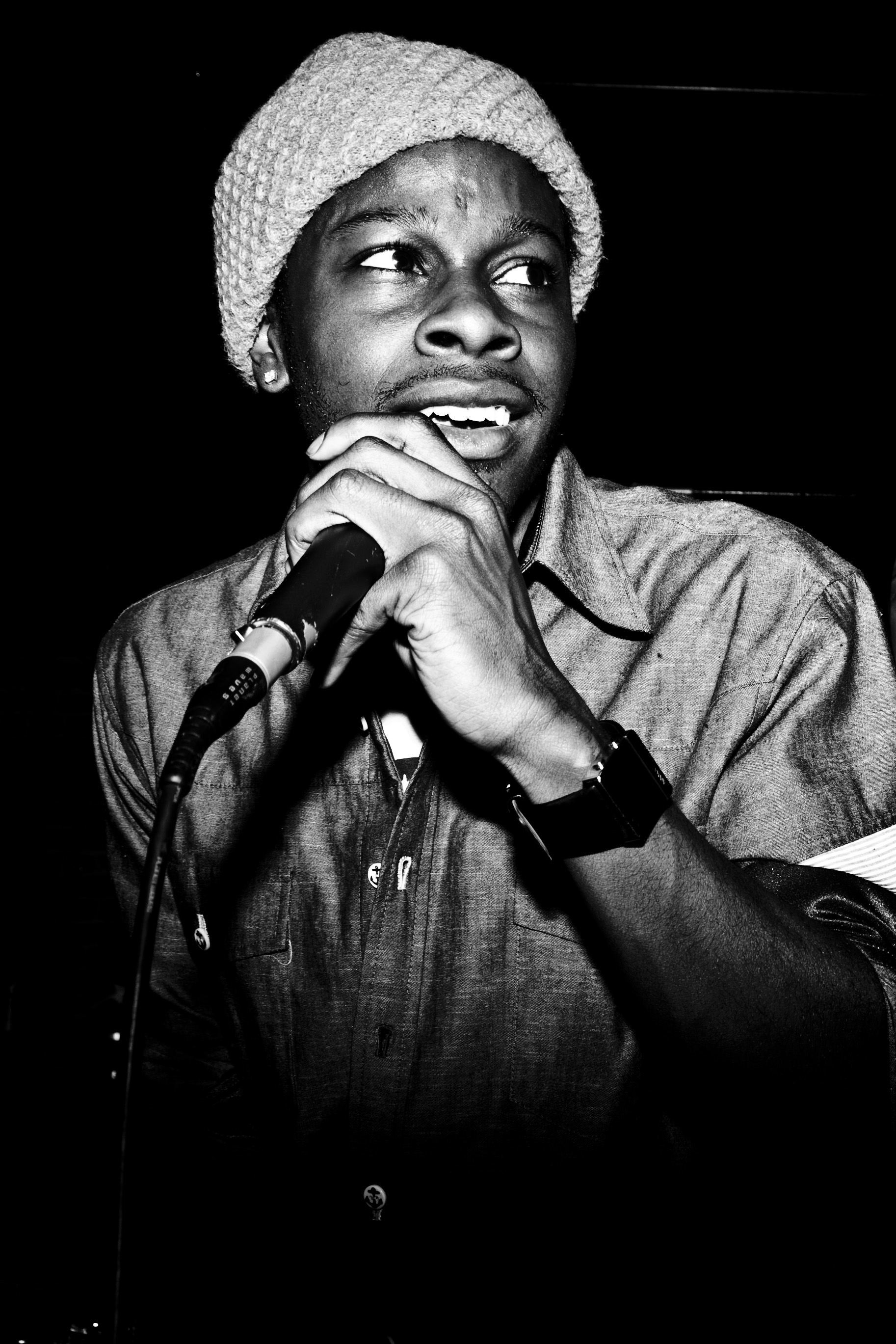
- Jesse Boykins III performing in May 2009

Background information
- Also known as: JBIII; JB3
- Born: Jesse Boykins III; February 20, 1985 (age 41); Chicago, Illinois, United States
- Genres: World; soul; neo soul; R&B; electronic; reggae; spoken word; hip hop
- Occupations: Singer; songwriter; record producer
- Instruments: Vocals; guitar
- Years active: 1994–present
- Labels: NomaDic MuSic; Ninja Tune; Def Jam

Jesse Boykins III (born February 20, 1985) is a Jamaican-American singer, songwriter, and record producer from Chicago, Illinois.

== Career ==
Boykins is a world soul artist originally from Jamaica, later relocating to Miami and finally Brooklyn. His first EP, Dopamine: My Life On My Back EP was released February 14, 2008 and his follow up The Beauty Created LP was released November 25, 2008 through NomaDic MuSic.

In November 2017, Boykins revealed that he was signed to Def Jam Recordings. His first album under his major label deal was a physical release of his mixtape Bartholomew, which was previously released for streaming on SoundCloud in 2016. Boykins received his first Grammy nomination for co-writing Steve Lacy's lead single Playground from his Apollo XXI album.

== Discography ==
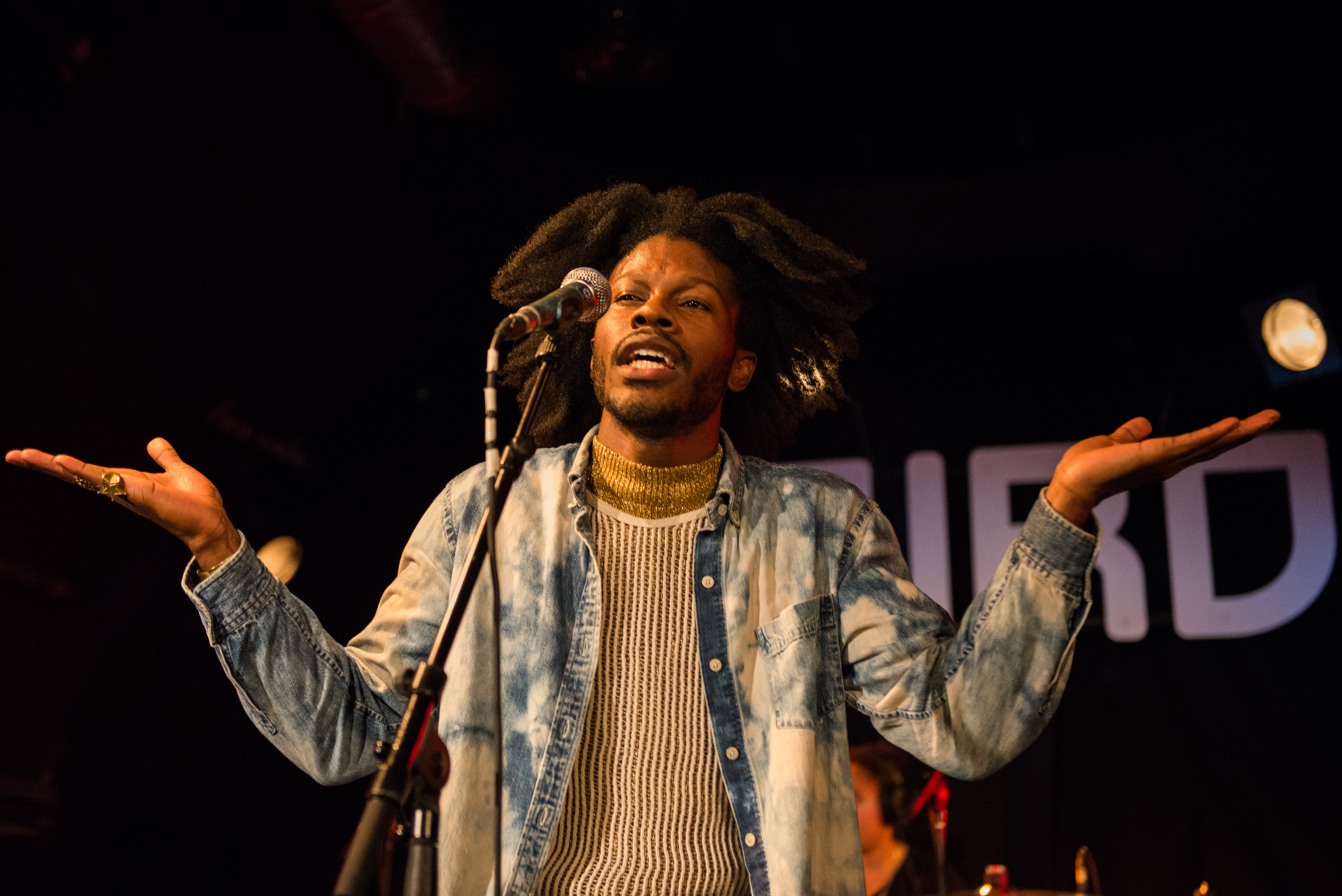
Boykins in 2014

=== Studio albums ===
- The Beauty Created (2008)
- Zulu Guru (with MeLo-X) (2012)
- Love Apparatus (2014)
- Bartholomew (2017)
- New Growth (2023)

=== Extended plays ===
- Dopamine: My Life on My Back (2008)
- Way of a Wayfarer (2011)

=== Writing credits ===
- "Playground" from Apollo XXI (2019) - Steve Lacy

=== Guest appearances ===
List of non-single guest appearances, with other performing artists, showing year released and album name
Title	Year	Other artist(s)	Album
"Make Me a Fool"	2010	The Foreign Exchange, Median	Authenticity
"A Place Where Lovers Go"	2013	The Jet Age of Tomorrow	JellyFish Mentality
"Higher Times"	2013	The Internet	Feel Good
"Magic"	2013	Vic Mensa	Innanetape
"Tribe"	2014	Theophilus London	Vibes
"Heartbreak in Motion"	2015	Anna Lunoe	—N/a
"Go"	2015	Donnie Trumpet & The Social Experiment, Mike Golden, Joey Purp	Surf
"Paradise"	2015	Logic	The Incredible True Story
"Just a Dose"	2015	Little Simz, Tiffany Goucheé, SiR, Isaiah Rashad, Kent Jamz	Age 101: Drop X
"Celestial Levels"	2016	Machinedrum	Human Energy
"Purple Tuesday"	2017	Rejjie Snow, Joey Bada$$	The Moon & You
"Annie"	2018	Rejjie Snow	Dear Annie
"Twogether"	2018	Sango	In The Comfort Of
"You're Gonna Need It"	2019	Lophiile	To Forgive
"Wait 4 U"	2020	Machinedrum	A View of U
"Intelligent Design"	2022	Kilo Kish	American Gurl
"Silence of Love"	2023	Tiga, Hudson Mohawke	L'Ecstacy
"Stand for Something"	2026	Dahi, Ant Clemons, Baby Rose	Black Boy (Alternative)
