= Dopamine: My Life on My Back =

2008 extended play by Jesse Boykins III

EP by Jesse Boykins III
- Recorded: February 14, 2008
- Genre: R&B
- Label: NomaDic MuSic
- Producer: Jesse Boykins III

Professional ratings
Review scores
Source	Rating
Okayplayer	(88/100)

Dopamine: My Life on My Back is the first EP by Jesse Boykins III, released in 2008.

== Track listing ==
All songs written, produced, engineered, and mixed by Jesse Boykins III.

1. "My Life on My Back" (featuring J.A.M.E.S Watts) – 0:54
2. "Tabloids" – 4:25
3. "Sounds Like Love" – 0:22
4. "Baby I Don't Know" – 3:50
5. "The Sea" – 2:53
6. "Sobriety" – 4:02
7. "Think" – 3:48
8. "All (Outro)" – 3:31

== Personnel ==
- J. Boykins III - keyboard, drums program
- J. Most - guitar, bass
- Earl Travis - bass
- Jamire Williams - drum
- Marion Ross III - trumpet, keyboard, beatbox
- Daniel - keyboard
- Anthony Coleman II - trumpet
- Justin Brown - drums
- Devry Pugh - rhodes
- Warren Fields - piano
- Steve Wyreman - guitar

=== Technical personnel ===
- Mastered by Ron Schaffer
- Jay Woo Design – art design
- J. Shotti, Nicky Woo – photography
- All music recorded at NSU Studios
