= The Beauty Created LP =

The Beauty Created

Studio album by Jesse Boykins III
- Recorded: November 25, 2008
- Genre: R&B
- Label: NomaDic MuSic
- Producer: Afta-1; Anthony Coleman II; Basil Wajdowicz; Hadyn Blatt for Phantom Lover; Hasan Insane; Jesse Boykins III; Jeremy Most; Marion Ross III; Rene Del Fiero; Steve Mckie; Steve Wyreman; Tone Whitfield

The Beauty Created LP is the first full-length release by singer-songwriter Jesse Boykins III, released on November 25, 2008.

Professional ratings
Review scores
Source	Rating
Okayplayer	(90/100)

== Track listing ==
All Songs Written by Jesse Boykins III (ASCAP)
Mastered by Ron Schaffer for Atlantic West Studios Brooklyn, NY
Art Design: DrWooArt

1. Fever (Produced by Jeremy Most & Jesse Boykins III)
2. Amorous (Produced by Anthony Coleman II, Jeremy Most, & Jesse Boykins III)
3. Come to My Room (Produced by Steve Wyreman & Jesse Boykins III)
4. Whispers (Produced by Steve Wyreman & Jesse Boykins III)
5. Shine (Produced by Steve Wyreman, Jesse Boykins III & Hasan Insane)
6. Trust (Produced by Basil Wajdowicz, Rene Del Fiero & Jesse Boykins III)
7. Victoria (Produced by Marion Ross III & Jesse Boykins III)
8. Pantyhose (Produced by Marion Ross III & Jesse Boykins III)
9. Itis (Produced by Steve Mckie, Tone Whitfield & Jesse Boykins III)
10. SunStar (Produced by Steve Wyreman & Jesse Boykins III)
11. Loopy (Produced by Hadyn Blatt for Phantom Lover)
12. Connected (Produced by Afta-1)
13. Chanel (Produced by Hadyn Blatt for Phantom Lover & Jesse Boykins III)
14. Be All Truth (Produced by Steve Wyreman & Jesse Boykins III)

Tabloids (Machinedrum Remix) Bonus Track (ASCAP)
Tabloids (MeLo-X House Remix) Bonus Track (ASCAP)

- NBC Bay Area on The Beauty Created
