= Bebey =

Studio album by Theophilus London
- Released: January 17, 2020
- Length: 49:00
- Label: Self-released
- Producer: Theophilus London; Kevin Parker

Theophilus London chronology
Vibes (2014)	Bebey (2020)

Singles from Version
- 1. "Bebey" Released: 22 August 2018; 2. "Only You" Released: 31 October 2018; 3. "Whiplash" Released: 30 January 2019; 4. "Pretty" Released: 8 August 2019; 5. "Cuba" Released: 5 December 2019

Professional ratings
Review scores
Source	Rating
Exclaim!	7/10

Bebey is the third studio album by American rapper Theophilus London. The album features guest appearances from Kristian Hamilton, Tame Impala, Gemaine, Lil Yachty, Ian Isiah, Raekwon, Giggs and Ariel Pink; it was self-released on January 17, 2020.

== Track listing ==
Bebey track listing
No.	Title	Length
1.	"Leon" (featuring Kristian Hamilton)	3:56
2.	"Marchin'"	3:11
3.	"Bebey"	3:50
4.	"Only You" (featuring Tame Impala)	3:35
5.	"Cuba"	2:43
6.	"Give You" (featuring Gemaine)	2:39
7.	"Seals" (featuring Lil Yachty & Ian Isiah)	4:48
8.	"Whiplash" (featuring Tame Impala)	2:50
9.	"Whoop Tang Flow" (featuring Raekwon)	4:01
10.	"Pretty" (featuring Ian Isiah)	4:01
11.	"Bebey" (featuring Giggs)	4:18
12.	"Seals (solo)"	6:03
13.	"Revenge" (featuring Ariel Pink)	3:49
Total length:		49:00
