= Brodinski =

French musical artist

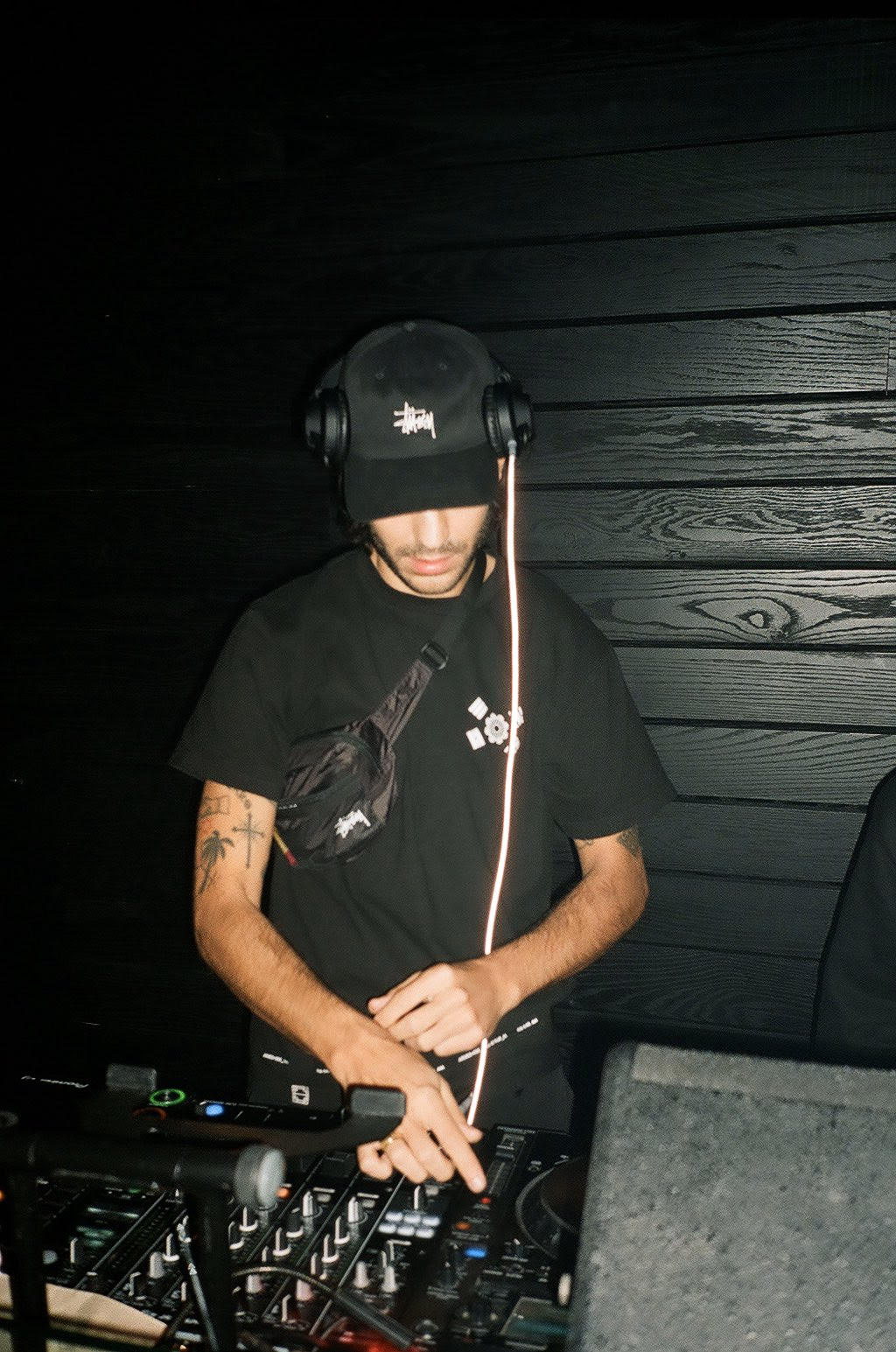
- Brodinski in Miami, 2019

Background information
- Born: Louis Rogé; Reims, France
- Genres: Techno; French house; hip hop
- Occupations: DJ; musician
- Labels: Bromance; Owsla; Parlophone; Warner

Louis Rogé (French pronunciation: [lwi ʁɔʒe]), known professionally as Brodinski, is a French composer, producer and DJ from Reims. Brodinski performs internationally and is regularly invited to major music festivals. He has appeared at events such as Parklife in Melbourne, Lovebox in London, and Sónar in Barcelona, where he has been a recurring performer.

== Biography ==
=== 2007–2011 ===
Rogé became passionate about DJing while in high school. His early inspirations were Damian Lazarus, Ivan Smagghe, 2 Many DJ's, and Andrew Weatherall. In Reims, his hometown, Brodinski became connected with DJs in the local electronic scene, including Yuksek. With Yuksek, he produced his first single, "Bad Runner", released on the renowned Swiss label Mental Groove. Being signed to the imprint allowed Brodinski to raise his profile and attract attention. He made his first appearances as a DJ and got the opportunity to publish a series of remixes by popular artists, from Klaxons or Bonde do Rolê.

Rogé’s entry into electronic music was heavily influenced by internet culture; he described himself as a "nerd" during his teenage years, spending thousands of hours discovering music online. While beginning his music career at age 18, he chose to prioritize his formal education, completing a degree in Communication in Lille. Upon graduation, he faced a choice between pursuing European diplomacy or a music career, ultimately choosing the latter to avoid "losing time" in the rapidly evolving French electronic scene.

At the end of 2007, Brodinski took part in the Soulwax Mas party organised in Ghent, an annual event at Christmas organized by the group Soulwax, alongside other artists such as Boyz Noize, Crookers and Tiga.

that Brodinski released the EP Oblivion on the latter's label, turbo, after the concert. After the EP's release, the organisers of the London techno party "Bugged Out" asked him to produce a compilation called Suck My Deck. He then became a resident of the Panik festivals at the Élysée Montmartre and embarked on his first tour as a DJ, from Belgium to England to Los Angeles, sharing the bill with artists such as Erol Alkan.

At the end of the 2000s, he became the principal resident of the Social Club, on Montmartre road and established himself as the figurehead of a multi-facet generation, swinging from one genre to another, between rap and techno.

At the same time, the DJ was involved in several projects. Associated with DJ Orgasmic, he put together the Best of Everything compilation fusing rap and techno. Alongside half of the duo The Shoes, Guillaume Brière, he formed the ephemeral duo Gucci Vump.

It was during one of his many tours that Brodinski met DJ Mehdi and found in him a true mentor. Still at the Social Club, DJ Mehdi and Brodinski regularly hosted an evening called "McFly Tuesday".

Brodinski has been vocal about the evolving role of the DJ, arguing that the profession had transitioned from a "wedding animator" to a stage performer akin to a live band. He maintains a philosophy of sharing personal musical vibrations rather than simply playing "what people want to hear."

=== 2012–2016 ===
Very affected by the sudden death of DJ Mehdi in September 2011, Brodinski decided to take a new step in his career and launched the Bromance label, in collaboration with Manu Barron and Guillaume Berg, of which he is both the producer and artistic director. Bromance embodies the spirit of Brodinski, his taste for discovery without worrying about categories, the importance of human connections and an instinctive functioning guided by encounters.

From the end of 2011, the label regularly signed new artists who formed the avant-garde of Parisian electronic music, including Gesaffelstein, Club Cheval and Louisahhh. Bromance's catalog then expanded internationally to North American artists including Detroit rapper Danny Brown and Canadian producers Kaytranada and Illangelo.

In 2013, Kanye West called on Brodinski and Gesaffelstein to assist in the production of his new album, Yeezus. The two Bromance artists co-produced two tracks on the record, "Black Skinhead" and "Send It Up". At the same time, Brodinski developed his collaborations across borders. In the studio, he met the New York rapper Theophilus London and the standard bearer of Washington rap Shy Glizzy.

His collaborations and his travels to the United States inspired Brodinski to release his first album, Brava. Released in early 2015, this album was inspired by Brodinski's interest in the city of Atlanta and its rap culture. It contains collaborations with rappers Bloody Jay, Young Scooter and Peewee Longway.

His music video for "Can't Help Myself" was the overall winner of Berlin Music Video Awards 2015, while its directors, MEGAFORCE, won the award for the "Best Director" category.

After the release of his first album, Brodinski hired young French producers such as Ikaz Boi, 8tm, and Myth Sizer under the Bromance banner, and associated them with American artists. The end of 2016 and the start of 2017 were marked by two releases, the Young Slime Season and Sour Patch Kid projects, which saw Brodinski continuing his interest in the Atlanta scene. The latter featured 21 Savage among other prominent Atlanta rappers.

=== 2016–2018 ===
Brodinski closed the Bromance label and decided to divide his time between Paris and Atlanta. He met many artists and released several projects such as the EP "Brain Disorder", "The Matrix" in collaboration with rapper Hoodrich Pablo Juan, and "The Graduation" the first EP of Lil Reek, a rapper he discovered in Atlanta and took under his wing. Brodinski embarked on a new club tour towards the North American continent.

=== 2018–2020 ===
Consolidating his establishment in Atlanta, he continued to collaborate with a series of young artists.

In 2019, Brodinski produced new tracks for rappers 645AR, Reddo, Hell Kell or Ola Playa. He then released the project "Evil World" on the New York label Cinematic. He took the opportunity to invite a cohort of rappers from all over America, including Xanman, NgeeYL and Doe Boy. With thick and saturated melodies, which could be "Perfect for a Halloween after party", according to the magazine The Fader, Evil World translates Brodinski's inspiration. At the same time, Brodinski continued to tour clubs throughout Europe.

== Discography ==
=== Albums ===
- 2015: Brava
- 2019: Evil World

=== Mixtape ===
- 2016: The Sour Patch Kid

=== Singles/EP ===
==== As Brodinski ====
- 2007: Bad Runner EP
- 2008: Oblivion EP
- 2009: Eurostarr (with Mumdance)
- 2009: Peanuts Club (avec Noob)
- 2010: Arnold Classics
- 2011: Let the Beat Control Your Body (featuring Louisahhh!!!)
- 2011: Manifesto
- 2012: Nobody Rules the Streets (featuring Louisahhh!!!)
- 2012: Bromance #7
- 2012: One Night Stand (remix with Canblaster)
- 2013: Late Night Alternative (Mixtape)
- 2013: The Purple Ride (Mixtape)
- 2013: Gimme Back the Night (featuring Theophilus London)
- 2019: Gang (featuring Doe Boy)

==== Remixes ====
- Klaxons – It's Not Over Yet (Brodinski Remix) [Bugged Out]
- Adam Sky – Ape-X (Brodinski Remix) [White]
- Radioclit – Divine Gosa (Brodinski Remix) [Counterfeet]
- Das Pop – Fool For Love (Brodinski Remix) [NEWS]
- Klaxons – Atlantis to Interzone (Yuksek & Brodinski Remix)
- Bonde do Role – Office Boy (Brodinski Remix) [Domino]
- The Teenagers – Homecoming (Yuksek & Brodinski Remix)
- Alphabeat – 10,000 Nights (Brodinski & Yuksek Remix) [EMI]
- Bitchee Bitchee Ya Ya – Fuck Friend (Yuksek & Brodinski Remix) [Kitsuné]
- D.I.M. – Is You (Brodinski Remix) [Boysnoize Records]
- Heartsrevolution – CYOA (Brodinski Remix) [Iheartcomix]
- Tiga & Zyntherius – Sunglasses at Night (Yuksek & Brodinski Remix) [Turbo]
- The Subs – Papillon (Yuksek & Brodinski Remix) [Lektroluv]
- Jokers of the Scene – Acidrod (Brodinski Remix) [Fool's Gold]
- DJ Mehdi – Pocket Piano (Brodinski Remix) [Ed Banger]
- The Shoes – America (Brodinski Remix) [GUM]
- Buraka Som Sistema – Aqui Para Voces (Brodinski Remix) [Enchufada]
- Radioclit – Secousse (Brodinski Remix) [Mental Groove]
- Mixhell – Highly Explicit (Brodinski Remix) [Boysnoize Records]
- Peaches – Lose You (Brodinski & Yuksek Remix) [XL]
- Deepgroove – Annihilate (Brodinski Remix) [Underwater]
- Edu K – Flutesnoot (Brodinski Remix) [Man Recordings]
- Tony Senghore – If You Came Here (Brodinski Remix) [Horehaus]
- Monomaniax – Sexy Turismo (Brodinski Remix) [Black Frog]
- Crookers – Transilvania (Brodinski Remix) [Southern Fried]
- Tiga – Overtime (Brodinski Remix) [Turbo]
- The Aikiu – Red Kiss (Brodinski Remix) [Savoir Faire]
- Nero – Crush On You (Brodinski Remix) [MTA Records]
- Yuksek – Off The Wall (Brodinski Remix) [Savoir Faire]
- Beni – Last Night (Brodinski Remix) [Modular]
- Theophilus London – Last Name London (Brodinski Remix) [Reprise Records]
- Justice – On & On (Brodinski Remix) [Ed Banger]
- Surkin – Lose Yourself (Brodinski Remix) [Marble]
- Scissor Sisters – Only The Horses (Brodinski Remix) [Polydor]
- Gesaffelstein – Viol (Brodinski Remix) [Turbo]
- Danny Brown – Die Like a Rockstar (Brodinski Remix) [Fool's Gold]
- Sébastien Tellier – Cochon Ville (Brodinski Remix) [Record Makers]
- Miike Snow – The Wave (Brodinski Remix) [UMG]
- Far East Movement – Dirty Bass (Brodinski Remix) [Interscope]
- Skrillex & Damian Marley – Make It Bun Dem (Brodinski Remix) [OWSLA]
- Symphony Hall – One Night Stand (Brodinski & Canblaster Remix) [Marble]
- Woodkid – I Love You (Brodinski Remix) [GUM]
- Laurent Garnier – Jacques in the Box (Brodinski & Gesaffelstein Dirty Sprite Remix) [Ed Banger]
- Destructo – Higher (Brodinski Remix)
- I am who I am – Y (Brodinski Remix)
- King L – Val Venis (Brodinski Remix)
- Mai Lan – Les Huîtres (Brodinski Remix)
- Empire of the Sun - DNA (Brodinski Remix)

==== As G. Vump (with Guillaume Brière of The Shoes) ====
2009 Sha! Shtil! EP

2010 Shakira – Loca (Production et G. Vump Remix)

2011 Mixtape Nvthin Bvt A Gvxxi Thang

- Bart B More – Romane (G. Vump Remix)
- Supra1 – Still Believe (G. Vump Remix)
- Matt & Kim – Cameras (G. Vump Remix)
- Woodkid – Iron (G.Vump Remix)
- Art Nouveau – Air France (G. Vump Remix)
- Yuksek – On a Train (G. Vump Remix)
- Lana Del Rey – Born to Die (G.Vump Remix)
- Switch – I Still Love You (G. Vump Remix)
- Arnaud Rebotini – Another Time, Another Place (G. Vump Remix)

2012

- Birdy Nam Nam – Written in the Sand (G.Vump Remix)
- Jon Convex – Fade (G. Vump Remix)
- Cashmere Cat – Mirror Maru (G. Vump Remix)

2013

- Mangane – G. Vump (dans la mixtape de Brodinski 'Late Night Alternative')
- Joke – Louis XIV (Production par G. Vump)

==== As The Krays ====
- 2010 : We Are Ready When You Are
