= Theophilus London =

American rapper and singer (born 1987)

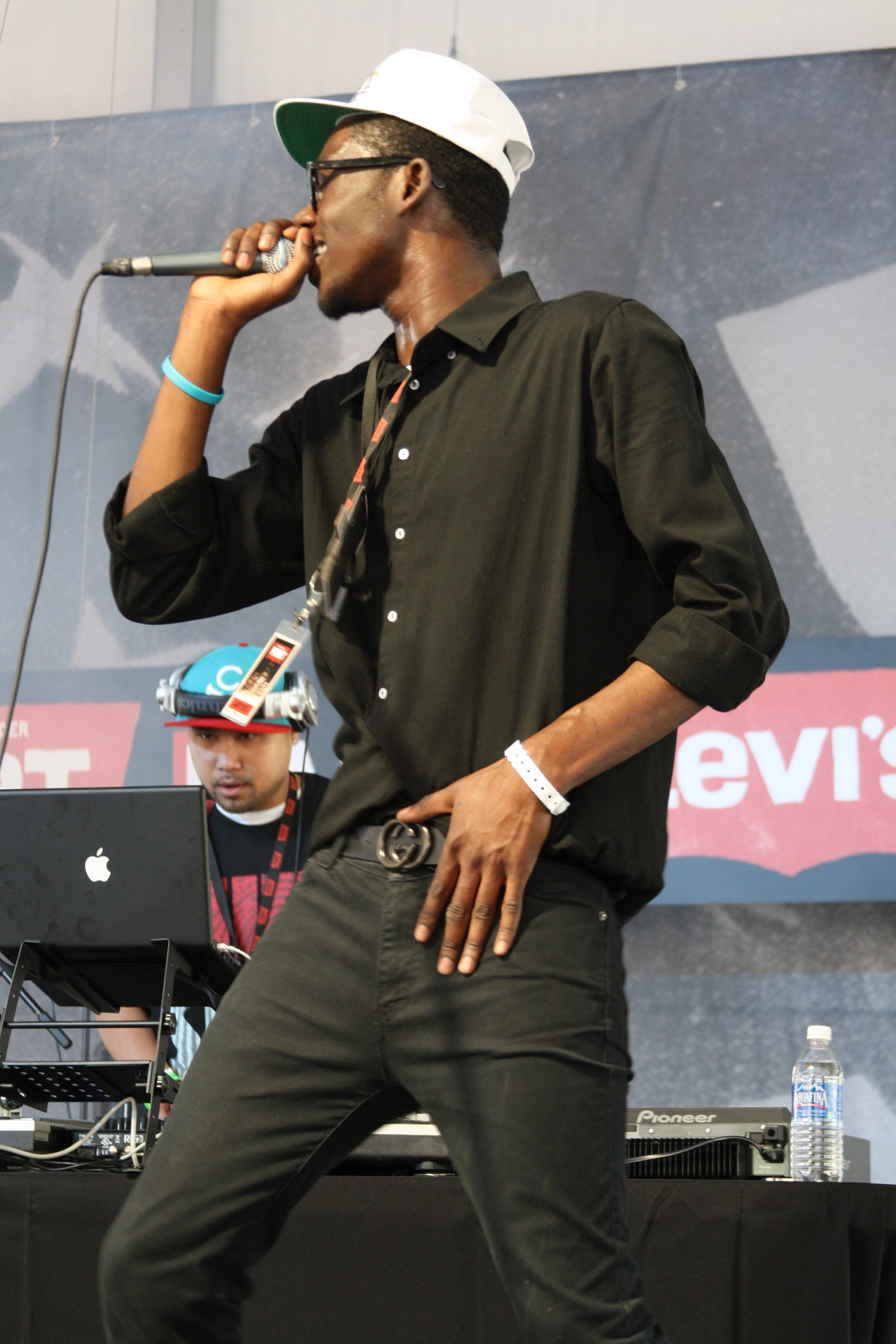
- London performing in 2009

Background information
- Born: Theophilus Musa London; February 23, 1987 (age 39); Port of Spain, Trinidad and Tobago
- Origin: New York City, U.S.
- Genres: Alternative hip-hop; alternative R&B
- Occupations: Rapper; singer; songwriter; record producer
- Years active: 2007–present
- Labels: Warner Bros.; Reprise

Theophilus Musa London (born February 23, 1987) is an American rapper, singer, and record producer. He is best known for his guest appearance alongside Allan Kingdom and Paul McCartney on Kanye West's 2015 single "All Day", which peaked at number 15 on the Billboard Hot 100 and received two Grammy Award nominations. London has also worked on several iterations of West's eleventh album Donda 2 (2022), as well as several of his unreleased projects.

London has worked in the fashion industry and conducted fashion campaigns for designers including Karl Lagerfeld, Virgil Abloh, and Gucci. He has designed footwear for companies including Cole Haan, and has modeled for Tommy Hilfiger.

== Early life and education ==
London was born in Port of Spain, Trinidad & Tobago, and later moved to New York City, specifically Flatbush, Brooklyn. He then moved to Mount Pocono, Pennsylvania, where he attended his junior and senior years of high school. He graduated in 2006 from Pocono Mountain East High School in Swiftwater, Pennsylvania. London grew up around Dominican, Puerto Rican, and Jamaican diasporas, going to local halls to learn the newest dances from Jamaica. He bought bootleg copies of albums by artists like Jay-Z, Mase, and Busta Rhymes. London's first performance was in 2002 at a local fair in Flatbush at the age of 16. After hearing his own recording around 2004–2005, London decided he wanted to pursue a career in the music industry.

== Career ==
London released his first mixtape JAM! in 2008. His second mixtape This Charming Mixtape came out in 2009 and his third mixtape I Want You in 2010. London's first tour was in 2009 alongside MeLo-X, who was his DJ, while his backing band was Body Language, whom he helped introduce to the final member to make the band a quartet.

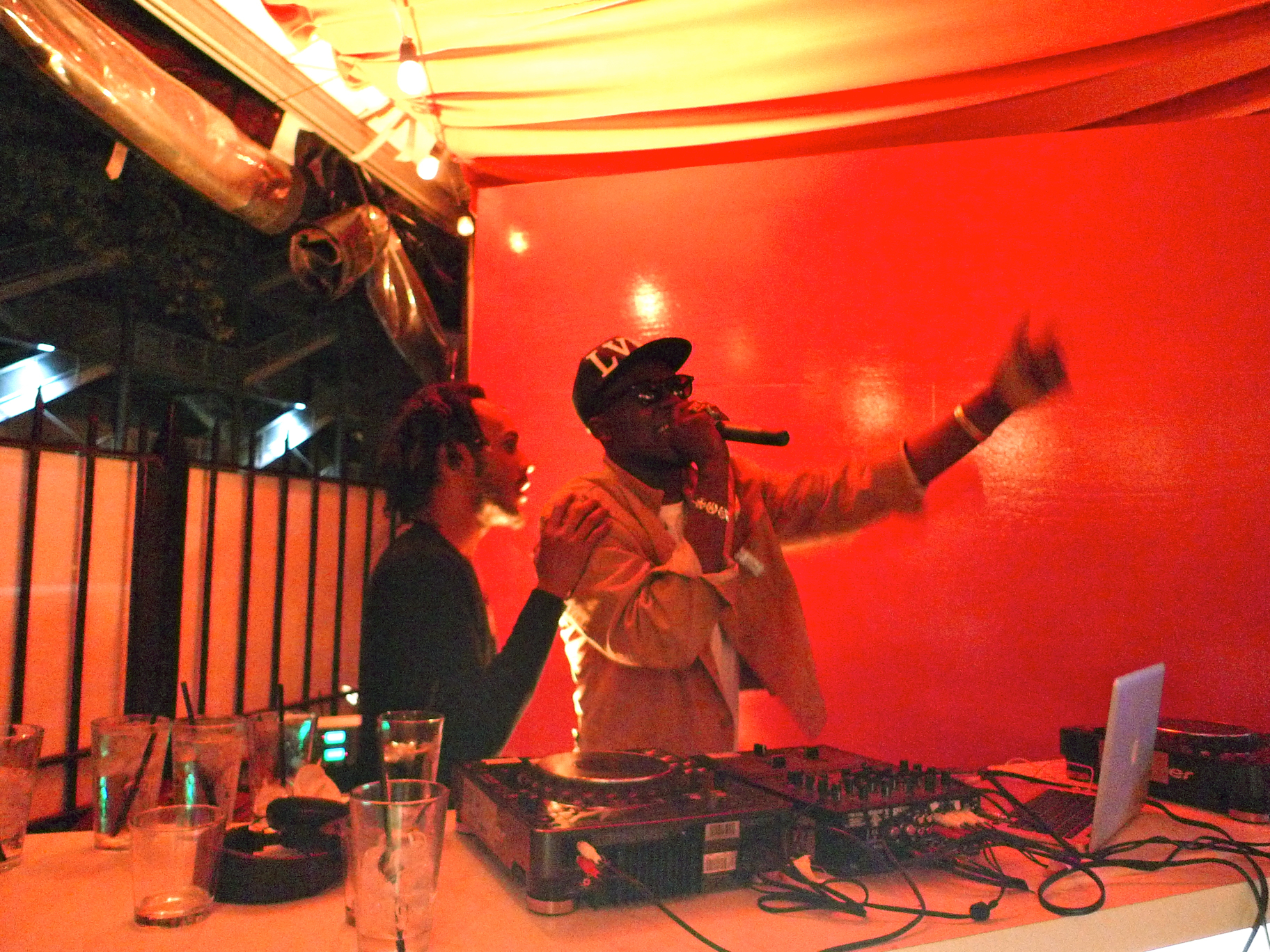
London in 2011

His debut EP Lovers Holiday was released on Warner Bros. Records on February 7, 2011, and featured TV on the Radio's Dave Sitek, Sara Quin from Tegan and Sara, Glasser, and Solange Knowles. His full-length debut album Timez Are Weird These Days, mixed by producer Dan Carey, was released by Warner Brothers on July 19, 2011.

London was one of the headliners of the Northside Festival in Brooklyn in June 2011. On June 30, London performed at the Montreal International Jazz Festival, in response to which the Montreal Gazette remarked "Theophilus London is going to be big. Very big. The buzz has been building for some time." Also in 2011, he was featured on the 90210 episode "Up in Smoke".

On February 22, 2012, London introduced his new single "Big Spender" to a select New York audience at the Encore Sessions at le Baron Chinatown. In March 2012, he performed with Solange at South by Southwest. He had previously introduced Solange to Dev Hynes, and the two went on to collaborate extensively on her 2012 EP True. London later released his mixtape "Rose Island Vol. 1" in July. He performed at Wireless Festival, Poolbar Festival, and RockNess in 2012, and Coachella in April 2013.

London's fashion relationships blossomed after his picture was published in Karl Lagerfeld's 2012 book The Little Black Jacket. After the book release, London was invited to perform at various parties for Chanel, playing in countries like Monaco for their local royalty. Around this time, Kanye West befriended London, the two would go out for dinners and shop for clothing together. West would take him to other countries like Mexico where they would go over album concepts together and play basketball.

In September 2013, London revealed that his new album Vibes was dedicated to his aunt who had died recently. In the meantime, his EP Lovers Holiday II was released. In September 2014, it was announced that his new album would be released in October and was executive produced by Kanye West and Leon Ware, with art direction from Virgil Abloh and Karl Lagerfeld. For the project London bought a house in Palm Springs, Florida, where he worked for over a year with Leon Ware there writing the project. The album sold less than 3,000 units. He was featured on Azealia Banks' song "JFK" off her debut studio album Broke with Expensive Taste, released in November 2014. Banks wrote London's verse for the only guest feature on the album. That same month, London performed with Jesse Boykins III on the Late Show with David Letterman.

"All Day" was released in March 2015. London performed the single alongside Kanye at the Brit Awards. Later in 2015, London went on his Vibes tour, having Doja Cat and Father open. London also performed at Rock in Rio USA. In February 2016, "All Day" was nominated for Best Rap Performance and Best Rap Song at the 58th Annual Grammy Awards. In November 2016, London released the song "Revenge" with Ariel Pink. The song interpolated New Musik's song "They All Run After the Carving Knife", from the band's second album Anywhere.

After his second album Vibes was released, London felt disenfranchised. Briefly deleting his social media accounts, he left his contract with Warner Records to go independent in 2017. In 2018, London was a runway model in a Louis Vuitton campaign. That October, he released the song "Whiplash" with Tame Impala, which took three years to make. Together, they also covered the song "Only You" by Steve Monite. In 2019, London's third EP "Lovers Holiday III" was released. In January 2020, London released his third studio album Bebey. In March 2022, he performed a show for Black History Month in the United Kingdom.

== Artistry ==
London's genre blending includes soul-pop, post-punk, electro and contemporary R&B. He has cited influences such as Michael Jackson, Prince, Kraftwerk, the Smiths, Morrissey, Marvin Gaye, Young Thug, and Skepta. Additionally, London has mentioned James Brown and Michael Jackson as performance inspirations.

== Personal life ==
In 2014, London moved from New York to Los Angeles with his pet dog and bought a house that formerly belonged to Humphrey Bogart in the Hollywood Hills neighborhood.

London's social media accounts, mainly Instagram, have allegedly been the subject of several hacks and privacy breaches.

In December 2022, London's family filed a missing persons report with the Los Angeles Police Department. According to his family, he went missing on October 15, 2022, and was last seen in Skid Row, Los Angeles. His last time active online or in contact with his family was in July 2022. London was found and confirmed safe by a family member in January 2023. No details about where London was located or why he had not contacted his family were provided.

== Discography ==
- Timez Are Weird These Days (2011)
- Vibes (2014)
- Bebey (2020)

== Awards and nominations ==
- 2011 MTV Europe Music Awards - Best Push Act (nominated)
- 58th Annual Grammy Awards - Best Rap Performance (nominated) and Best Rap Song (nominated) for "All Day"

== Filmography ==
- Party Legends (2017)

== See also ==
- List of solved missing person cases (2020s)
