= La Cigale =

Theatre in Paris, France

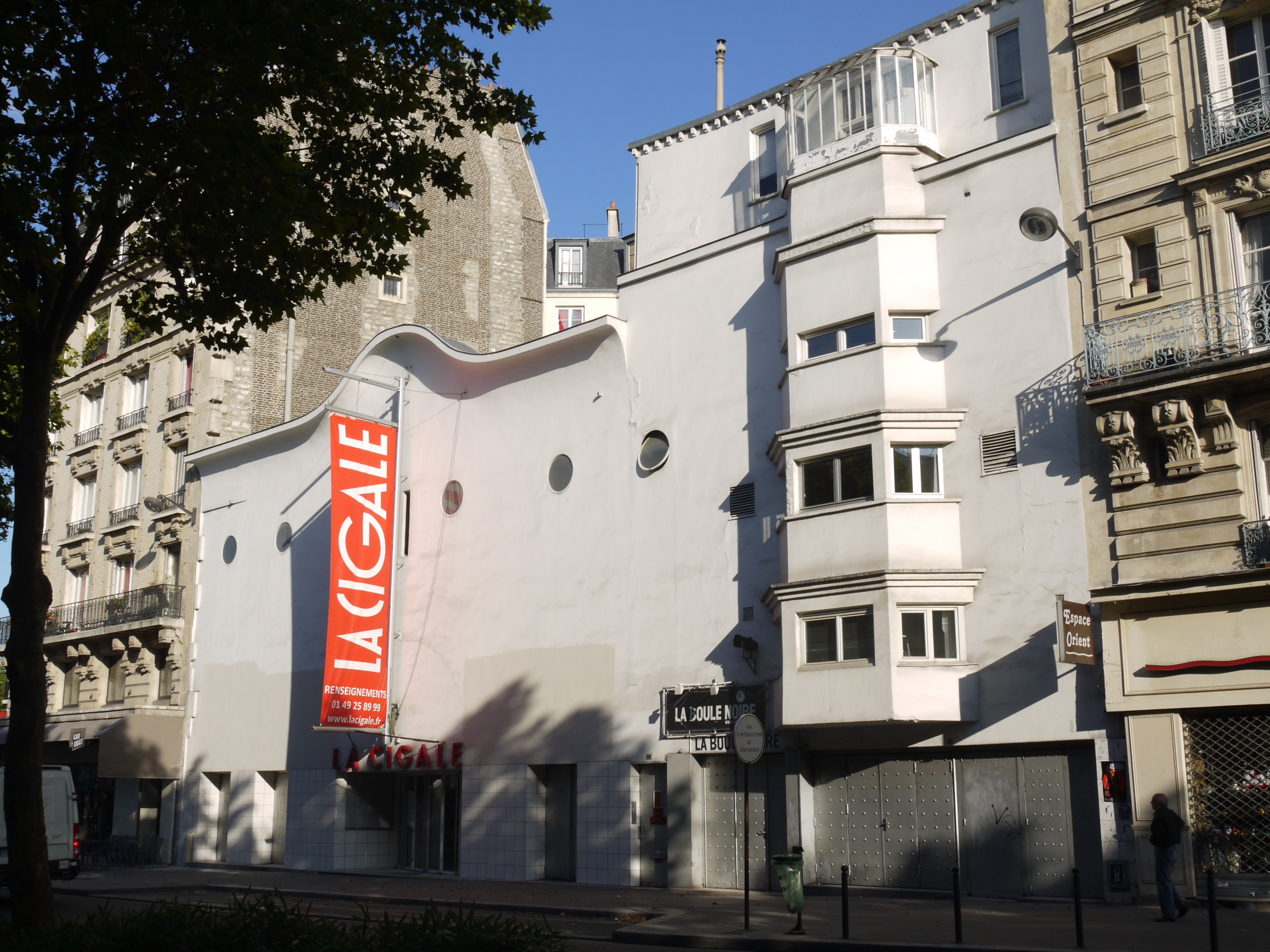
- La Cigale in 2010
- Interactive map of La Cigale
- Address: 120, boulevard de Rochechouart, 18th. Paris; France
- Coordinates: 48.882359°N 2.340131°E
- Capacity: 954 (everyone seated); 1,389 (some standing)
- Type: Concert hall

Construction
- Opened: 1887
- Reopened: 1987
- Rebuilt: 1894

La Cigale (French pronunciation: [la siɡal]; English: The Cicada) is a performance venue located at 120, boulevard de Rochechouart near Place Pigalle, in the 18th arrondissement of Paris. It is part of a complex connected to the Boule Noire. The auditorium can accommodate 1,389 people standing or 954 seated. The orchestra floor has a scalable platform that can tilt and rise using a hydraulic system.

The Inrockuptibles music festival took place at La Cigale for over twenty years. La Cigale also hosts the Factory Festival.

== History ==
- 1887: La Cigale was built on the site of the former Boule Noire cabaret, which was demolished to make room for the new theatre. When it was first built, La Cigale had room for approximately 1,000 people and featured theatrical revues.
- 1894: The theatre was enlarged and remodeled by architect Henry Grandpierre, and ceiling paintings were added by Adolphe Leon Willette. During this period, La Cigale featured performances by Mistinguett, Maurice Chevalier, Yvonne Printemps, Arletty, Raimu, and Max Linder.
- 1920: The hall was given over to operettas, vaudeville, and avant-garde evenings with Jean Cocteau. A cabaret opened in the basement of La Cigale in 1924, but closed permanently three years later; it was replaced by the small temporary La Fourmi (English: The Ant) music hall.
- 1940: La Cigale was converted into a movie theater specializing in B movies and Kung-fu films, and later, X-rated movies.
- 1981: The theatre's vestibule and auditorium were included in the list of French historical monuments on December 8, 1981
- 1987: La Cigale hosted a performance by the Les Rita Mitsouko band with the support of Jacques Renault and Fabrice Coat, two former antique dealers and cofounders of the famous Paris Les Bains Douches nightclub. The auditorium was modernized and a hydraulic system was added. The interior was redecorated by famed designer Philippe Starck. Corinne Mimram was appointed artistic and musical director.
- 2007: La Cigale partnered with French telecommunications company SFR for two years, during which the name of the venue was officially changed to La Cigale SFR.
- 2011: In January, Jean-Louis Menanteau became the new general director.

== Performers ==
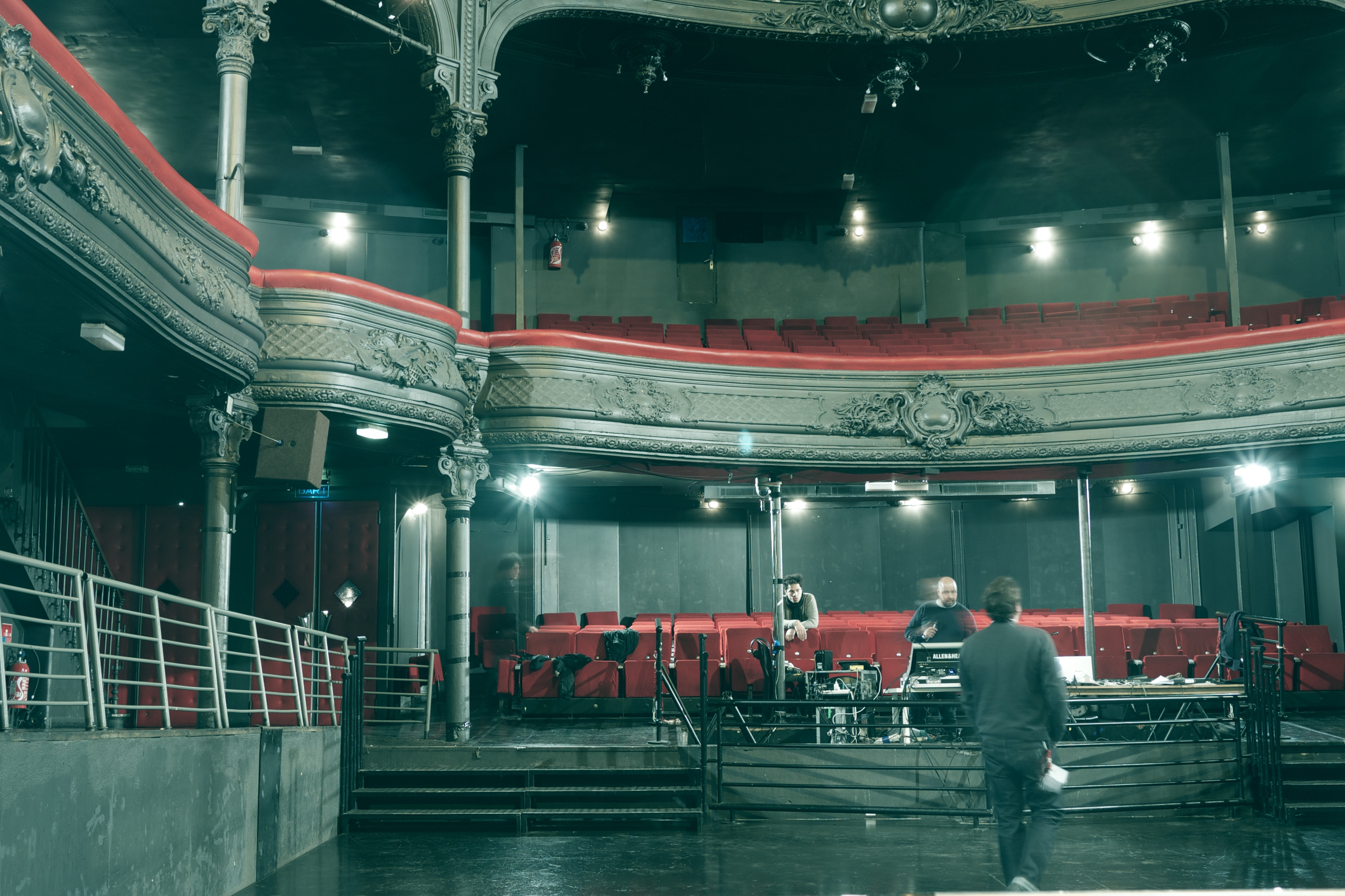
Interior of La Cigale in 2011 (left) and Colours in the Street's live show at La Cigale in 2024 (right)

Entertainers who have performed at La Cigale include:

- Adele
- The Allman Brothers Band
- Angels & Airwaves
- Angerme
- Babymetal
- Banks
- Jenifer Bartoli
- Jeff Beck
- Behemoth
- Birdy Nam Nam
- Billie Eilish
- Blur
- Carpenter Brut
- Jimmy Buffett
- °C-ute
- Manu Chao
- Chinese Man
- Eric Clapton
- Coldplay
- The Dandy Warhols
- David Bowie as part of Tin Machine
- Mac DeMarco
- The Darkness
- Dido
- Diego Torres
- Dir En Grey
- Dub Incorporation
- Jango Edwards
- Elephanz
- Europe
- F.T. Island
- Franz Ferdinand
- Dave Gahan
- Ghost
- Gorillaz
- Johnny Hallyday
- Morten Harket
- Sophie Hunger
- Iggy Pop
- Norah Jones
- Stacey Kent
- Kokia
- L'impératrice
- Litfiba
- Lush
- -M-
- Marillion
- Massive Attack
- MGMT
- Kylie Minogue
- The Moody Blues
- Willy Moon
- Jason Mraz
- Elliott Murphy
- Muse
- Noir Désir
- Claude Nougaro
- Oasis
- Okean Elzy
- Page & Plant
- Pierre Palmade
- Panic! at the Disco
- Paramore
- Parcels
- Parkway Drive
- Placebo
- Les Plastiscines
- Daniel Powter
- Prince
- Pulp
- R5
- Radiohead
- Red Hot Chili Peppers
- Les Rita Mitsouko
- Mark Ronson
- Roxette
- The Servant
- Sigrid
- Troye Sivan
- Sleater-Kinney
- Status Quo
- The Stone Roses
- Superbus
- Supergrass
- Sunmi
- Charles Trenet
- Bonnie Tyler
- Ulver
- Vitaa
- Les Wampas
- Kim Wilde
- Johnny Winter
- The Wombats
- Les Wriggles
- Zemfira
- Julie Zenatti

== Concerts and performances recorded at La Cigale ==
- Marc Lavoine : Live at La Cigale (concert album - 1988)
- David Bowie as part of Tin Machine : Tin Machine at La Cigale in Paris 1989
- Marillion : Made Again, disc 2 (CD - 1996)
- Les Wriggles : La Cigale (DVD - 2003)
- Lofofora : Blades background (CD + DVD - 2004)
- Johnny Hallyday : La Cigale 94 (CD - 2004)
- Les Wampas : Never trust a live! (CD + DVD - 2004)
- Thomas Fersen : La Cigale great days (CD + DVD - 2004)
- Mano Negra : General Tour
  concert in 1990 included in the DVD Out of Time (2005)
- Bonnie Tyler : Bonnie on Tour (DVD 2005)
- Robert : Live at La Cigale (CD + DVD - 2005)
- Daniel Powter : Lie to Me (Daniel Powter Song) (And later the Deluxe Edition of Daniel Powter)- "Styrofoam" (Live at La Cigale)
- James Blunt : Live at La Cigale
  bonus DVD with the album Back to Bedlam (2006)
- Vincent Delerm : La Cigale (2CD +2 DVD - 2007)
- Johnny Hallyday : La Cigale 2007 (CD + DVD - 2007)
- Catherine Ringer : sings Rita Mitsouko and more
  at La Cigale (CD + DVD - 2008)
- Grand Corps Malade : In Concert (CD + DVD - 2009)
- Booba : Autopsie Show (CD - 2010)
- Birdy Nam Nam : Live (2006)
- Stacey Kent : Dreamer In Concert (CD - 2012)
- Coldplay : Violet Hill (Song) (Mylo Xyloto Live - DVD 2012)
- Sleater-Kinney : Live in Paris (CD - 2017)
- Marillion : Brave Deluxe Edition, discs 3-4 (CD - 2018)
