= Elephanz =

French electro pop duo

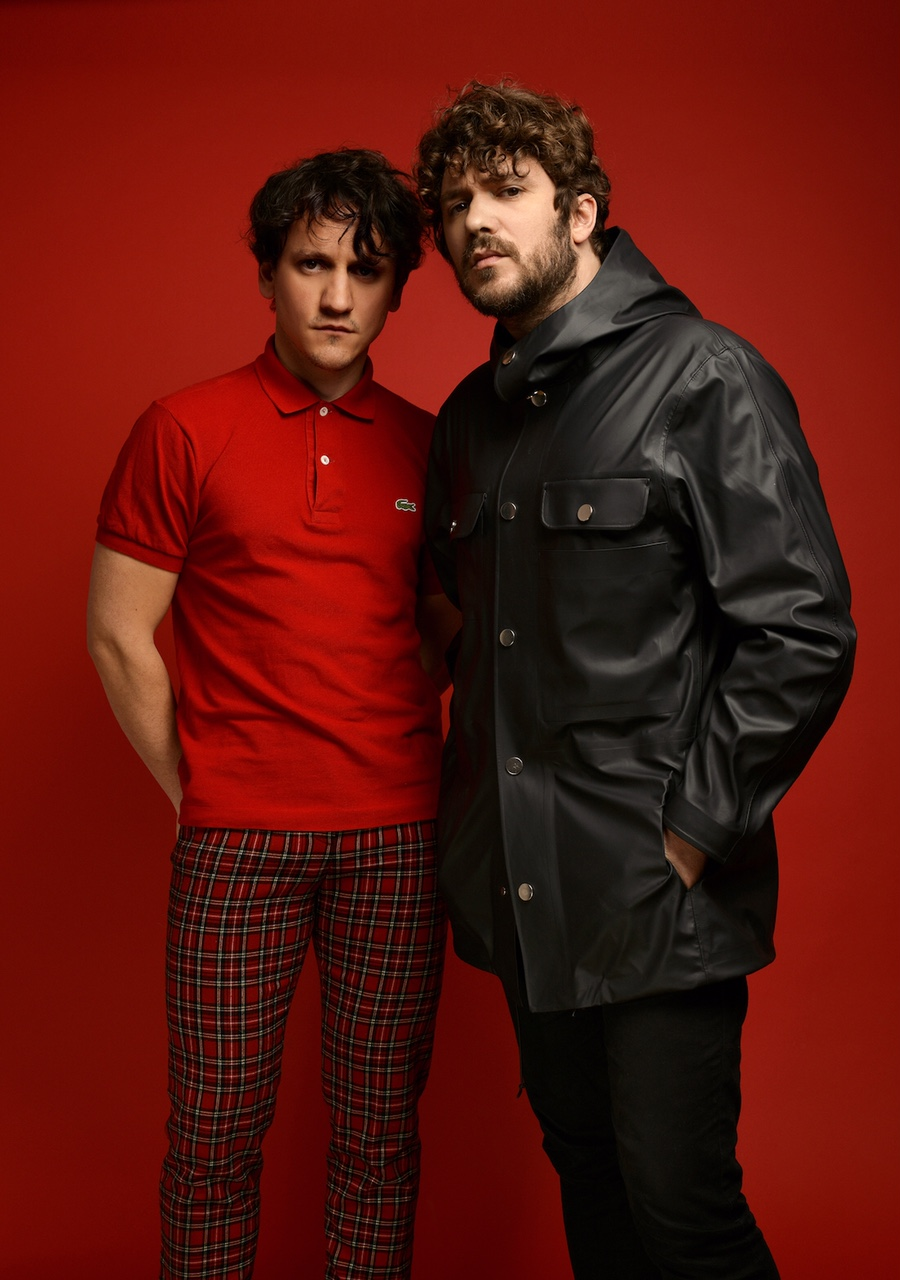

Background information
- Origin: Nantes, France
- Years active: 2008-present
- Label: Blackbird / Affection London / Musicast
- Members: Jonathan Verleysen; Maxime Verleysen; Clement Plaza-Illand
- Past members: Thibaud Vanhooland

Elephanz is a French electro / pop duo formed in January 2008 by the two brothers Jonathan 'Jon' and Maxime 'Max' Verleysen, originating from Nantes, France. The Verleysen brothers are the sole composers and songwriters of their albums. They are both vocalists, with Jonathan playing guitar and Maxime the keyboards. Their live performances include Clement Plaza-Illand playing the drums.

They are currently signed to Blackbird / Affection London / Musicast and are managed by Yamani 'Momo' Dazi (who previously co-founded the label Big Cheese Records).

== Career ==
The formation released the EP Ideal Roommates in 2009 and were invited later that year to the prestigious Transmusicales Festival in Rennes. In 2010, the band received the first 'Prix Chorus' (Chorus Award) out of 600 possible candidates.

Elephanz's first album, Time for a Change, was released in 2013 with a Deluxe version published in 2014. The first single is Stereo (which features in the compilation Nova Tunes 2.4, and in the movie Les Profs 2) while the track Time for a Change was used in several TV adverts, including Fnac, Volvo, Numericable.

The band was nominated for the highly esteemed Victoires de la Musique award for 'Electronic Music Album of the Year'in 2014. The awards ceremony is the French equivalent of the Brit Awards or Grammys. Their 2014-2015 tour included 50 dates and saw the group play in iconic venues, such as La Cigale in Paris, Stereolux in Nantes, and famous festivals like Francofolies, Papillons de Nuit and Printemps de Bourges.

Their second album, Elephanz, was released on October 13, 2017 with their first single Blowing like a Storm receiving airplay on FG Radio, M6 (TV channel) and W9. This second opus is remarkably different to the first, with more consistency between singles (often all relating to love, passionate, or feeling lost' as well as a more 'electro' sound, all underpinned by an improved, more slick production level. An Intro and two other tracks (Freakshow and American Lover) also mix French with English lyrics.

The band started touring for this second album in late October 2017 with feature shows in Paris, Marseille, Lyons, Strasbourg, Rennes and Mulhouse in November, with more dates to follow in 2018.

== Discography ==
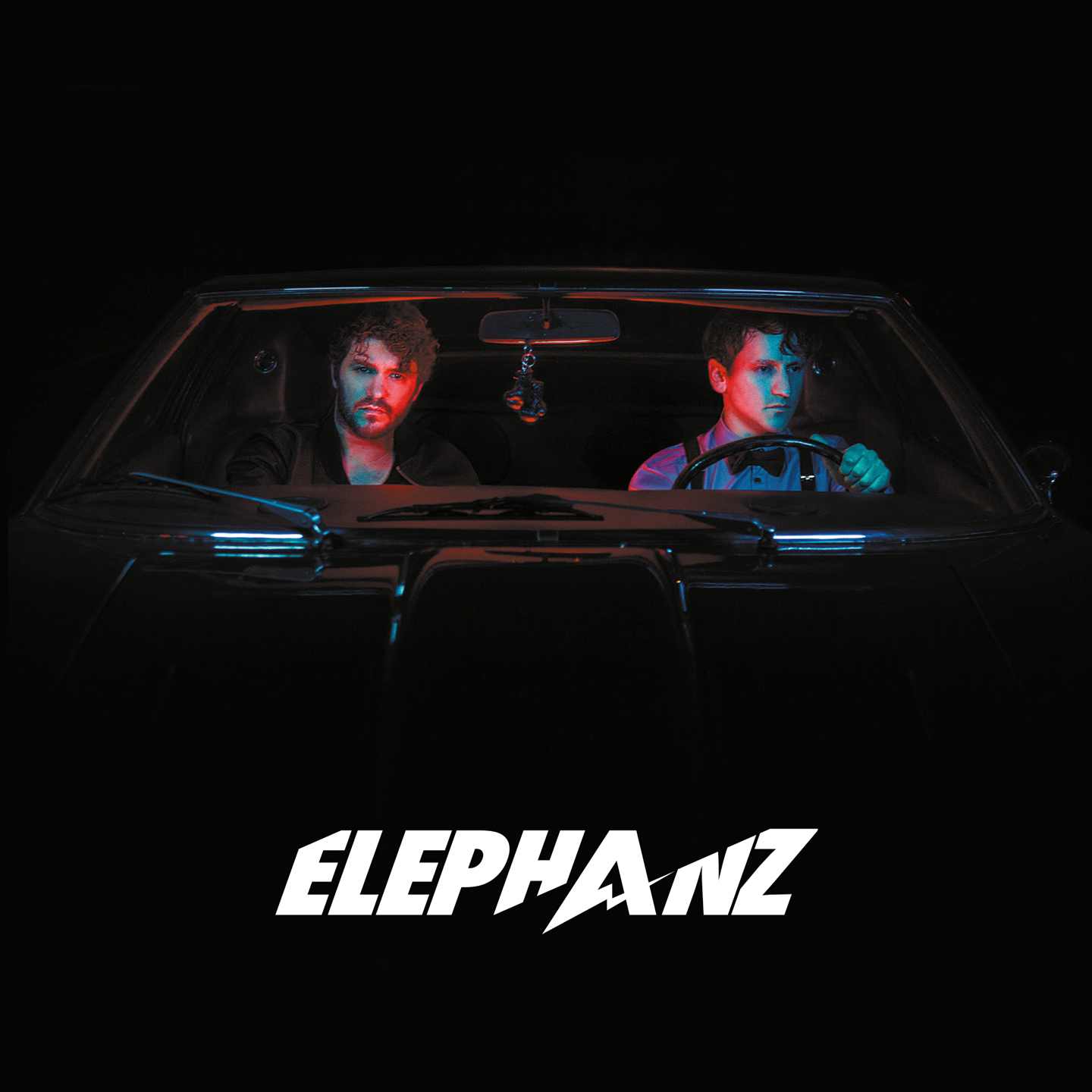
Cover of Elephanz album

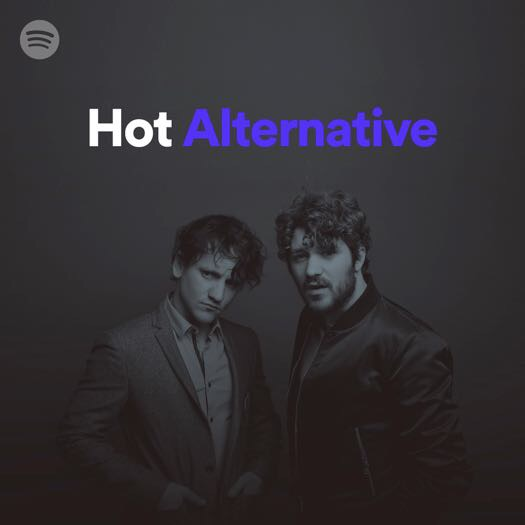
Elephanz on the cover of a Spotify playlist

=== Albums ===
| Year | Album | Peak positions |
| Year | Album | FR |
|---|---|---|
| 2013 | Time for a Change | 173 |
| 2017 | Elephanz | - |
| 2023 | Rien De Personnel | - |

=== EPs ===
| Year | Album | Peak positions |
| Year | Album | FR |
|---|---|---|
| 2010 | Ideal Roommates EP | 58 |
| 2020 | L'histoire à l'envers | |

=== Singles ===
| Year | Single | Peak positions and Nber of Spotify Streams | Album |
| Year | Single | FR | Album |
|---|---|---|---|
| 2011 | "Stereo" | – | Ideal Roommates EP |
| 2013 | "Time for a Change" | 99 | Time for a Change |
| 2017 | "Blowing like a Storm" | - | Elephanz |
| 2018 | "Maryland" | - | Elephanz |
| 2019 | "Imperfection" | - | - |
| 2020 | "L'histoire à l'envers" | | L'histoire à l'envers |
