= Balelec Festival =

Music festival in Switzerland

Festival Balélec
- Genre: pop; indie pop; rap; french rap
- Dates: Yearly, in May
- Location: Lausanne, Switzerland
- Coordinates: 46°31′6.41″N 6°33′59.05″E
- Years active: 1981–present
- Founders: students at EPFL
- Attendance: 16'000 people
- Website: https://balelec.ch/en/

The Balélec Festival is the largest musical event organized by students in Europe. It is usually the first open-air music festival happening in Switzerland each year during Spring. It is organised by volunteers on the campus of École Polytechnique Fédérale de Lausanne near lake Geneva in Lausanne, Switzerland around the beginning of May.

Originally the ball of the school's electronics faculty, the festival is known to happen on a rainy day. It has been held at EPFL since 1981. Each year on a Friday night the school welcomes 15'000 people (since 2003) and 30 live concerts. Concerns about excessive consumption of alcohol at the festival are denied by the organizers.

In 2015 and again in 2016, the festival once again attracted a sold out crowd of about 15,000 spectators. The budget for the 2016 festival was 650,000 swiss francs.

== History ==
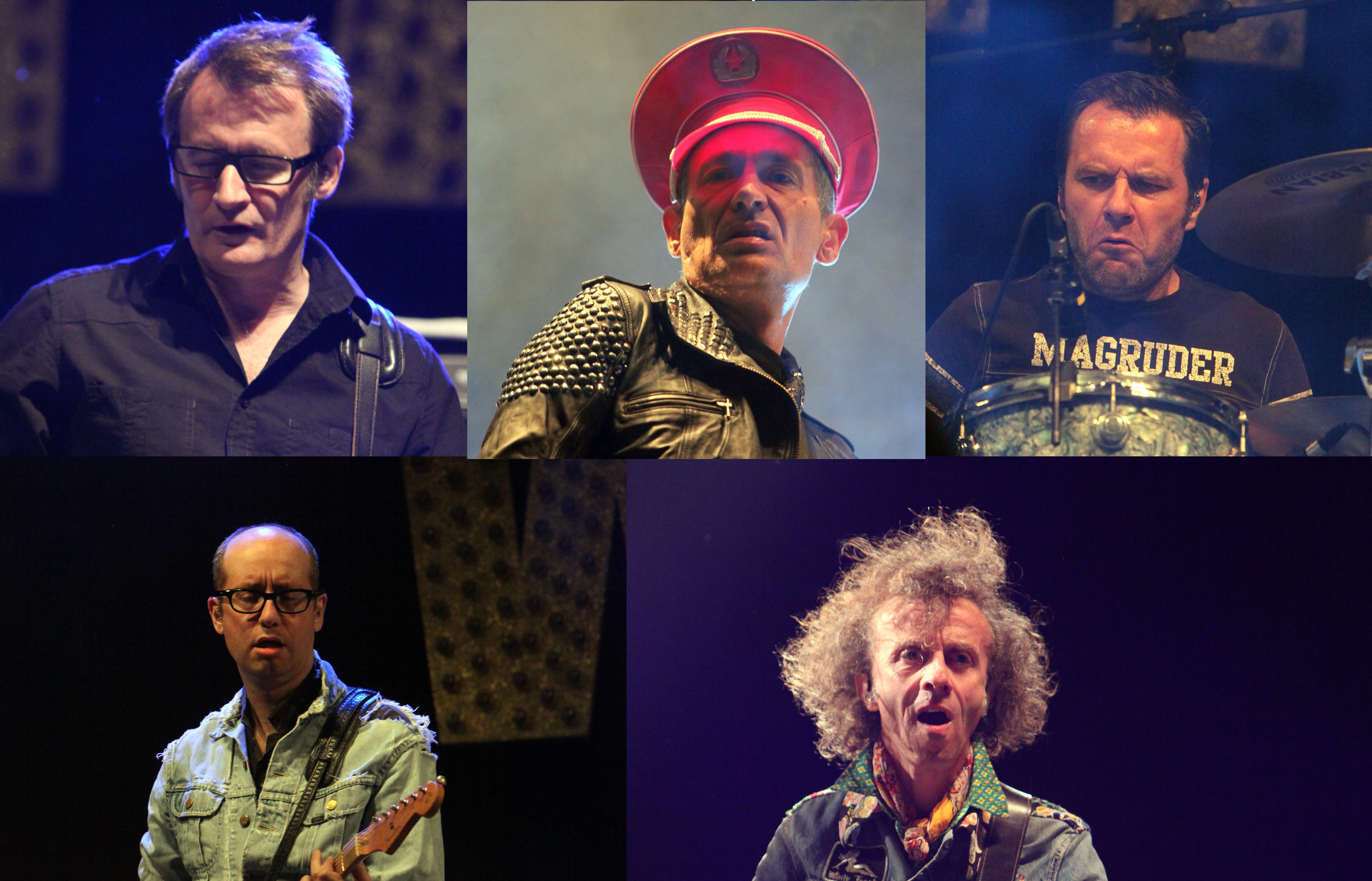
Les Wampas at Balélec 2011. Clockwise from top left: Jean-Mi Lejoux (bass), Didier Wampas (lead vocals), Niko Wampas (drums), Tony Truant (guitar), Philippe Almosnino (guitar)

Balélec ("bal"-"élec") was originally the yearly-held ball of the electrical and electronic engineering students at EPFL. It was first organized by professors of the school of engineering, and was progressively adopted by students, who transformed it into a festival.

== The organization ==
The Balelec Festival is planned and managed by a student club recognized by EPFL and listed as a non-profit organization.

A part of the funds to mount the festival comes from sponsorships and the other part comes from the tickets sold for the event. The student association has an overall budget of 800'000 Swiss francs. All the money earned during the event is used to fund the next edition.

The orgalization is composed of a main committee of 50 volunteers, mostly EPFL and UNIL students, who are divided into four teams: Animation, logistics, promotion and internal resources.

In addition, more than 300 volunteers and professional staff help with the setup on campus during the setup week and after the festival. On site, there are seven musical indoor and outdoor stages and about 30 live concerts each the year.

== Outdoor stages ==
The main live stages of the festival are outdoors. These 2 stages are called the Grande Scene (the main stage) and the Scene Azimuts. The main stage has an eclectic musical line-up while the other one is more rock/metal oriented. In 2012, the volume on these outdoor stages led to complaints from neighbouring residents, leading to a reduction in the volume of the bass frequencies in 2013.

== Indoor stages ==
Indoor, the festival owns 4 scenes.

The Satellite Scene is a live stage put in place in a collaboration with Satellite, a bar on the EPFL campus. Its line-up is oriented towards French and Balkan music.

The festival has also two electronic music stages called the Coupole and the SoundGate, the last one taking place in the Faculty of Architecture's hall.

The last indoor scene is called The Dome with a nightclub ambiance.

== See also ==
- EPFL
- Satellite
