= Volo (musical duo) =

French musical duo

- Origin: France
- Genres: Chanson
- Years active: 2001–present
- Labels: Opera Music; PlayOn; At(h)ome
- Members: Frédéric Volovitch; Olivier Volovitch
- Website: volo.fr

Volo is a French musical singing duo made up of brothers Frédéric et Olivier Volovitch originating from Tours, France of Ukrainian origin, with Volo being an abbreviation of the family name.

== Career ==
Frédéric Volovitch had been a singer and guitarist with the French band Les Wriggles with Christophe Gendreau, Stéphane Gourdon, Antoine Réjasse and Franck Zerbib since 1995. He was studying at the Conservatoire de la rue Blanche in Paris. Starting with 2001, he decided to run as a side project a duo formation with his brother, with the duo's first public appearance in 2002 as an opening act to Bénabar. The duo was signed to Opera-Music label. Volo released their debut album Bien Zarbos in 2005 with 19 tracks. It was so successful that they recorded a live acoustic version of 23 songs on their 2006 live album Blancs Manteaux à Volo. They included photos of the concerts on the record sleeve as a thank you.

In August 2006, Antoine Réjasse and Franck Zerbib decided to quit Les Wriggles, but Frédéric Volovitch stayed in the formation renderred a trio in addition to continuing the Volo project. Volo's second album was Jours heureux released in 2007 also on the Opera-Music label followed by EP Bref... made available online and as an added bonus to Jours heureux. Third studio album released in 2009 studio called En attendant. Meanwhile, Les Wriggles had folded allowing concentration on Volo.

Sans Rire is the band's most-recent release with two singles "Toujours à Côté" in November 2012 and "Sans rire" in January 2013.

== Discography ==
=== Albums ===
Studio albums

Year	Album	Peak positions
Year	Album	FR
2005	Bien zarbos	200
2007	Jours heureux	185
2009	En attendant	63
2013	Sans rire	53
2017	Chanson française	75
2020	Avec son frère	128

Live albums

- 2006: Blancs Manteaux à Volo

Compilation albums

- 2010: C'est pas tout ça
