= Voyou =

French singer and songwriter (born 1989)

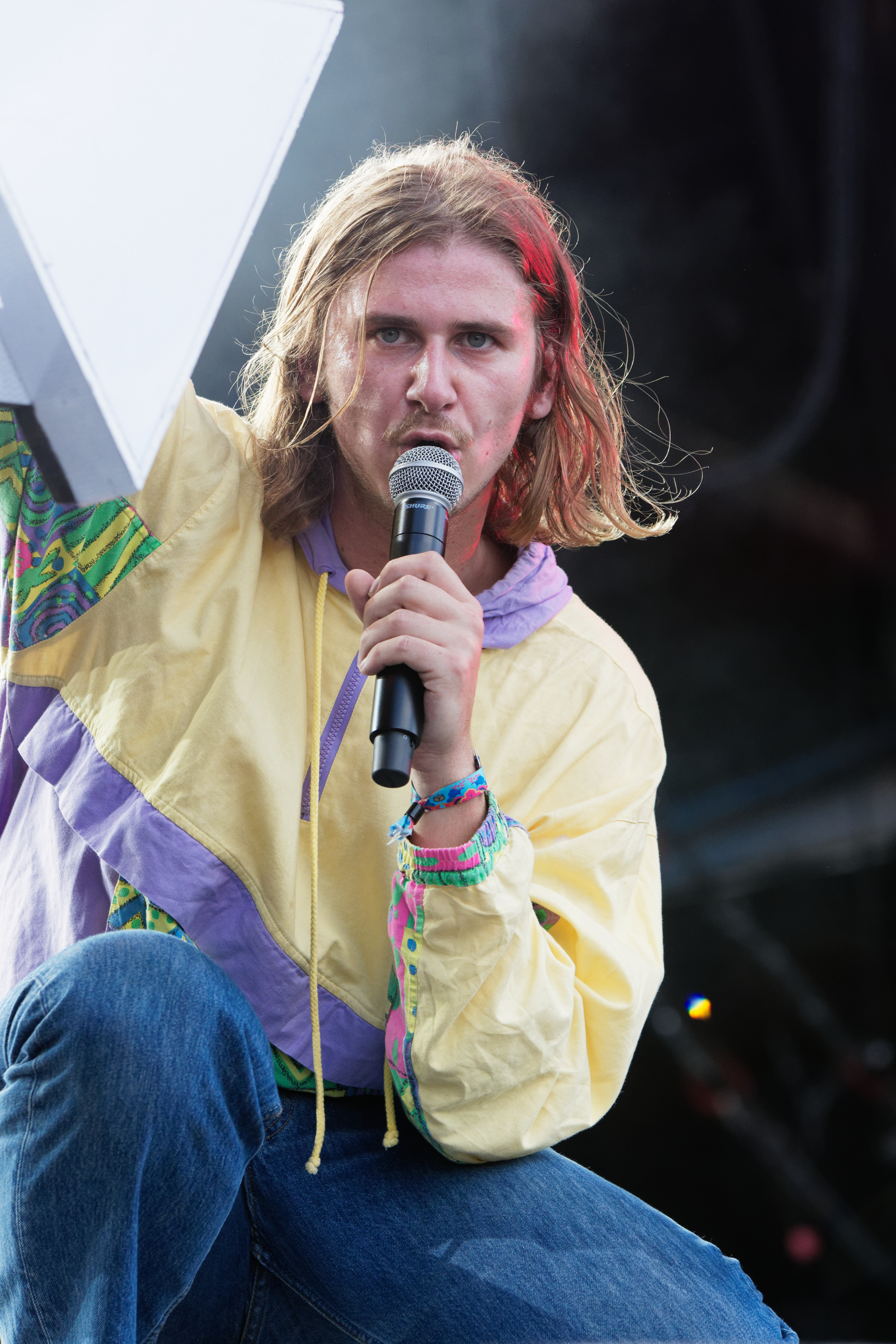
- Voyou in 2018

Background information
- Also known as: Voyou; Voyov
- Born: Thibaud Vanhooland; 24 October 1989 (age 36); Lille, France
- Genres: Alternative; electropop; indie; pop
- Occupations: Singer; songwriter
- Label: Entreprise

Thibaud Vanhooland (born 24 October 1989), known professionally as Voyou, is a French singer-songwriter.

== Early life ==
Born in Lille, Thibaud Vanhooland learned music from an early age from his father, a music teacher and trumpeter. He entered the Conservatoire de Lille at a young age to learn the trumpet before becoming a multi-instrumentalist, playing guitar, bass, drums, and piano. After his parents' separation, he later spent time living in Nantes. It was there that he joined Elephanz, an electropop duo. He later described this period as important in developing his skills as a musician.

Vanhooland began writing songs in 2017 under the pseudonym Voyov, which later became Voyou.

== Career ==
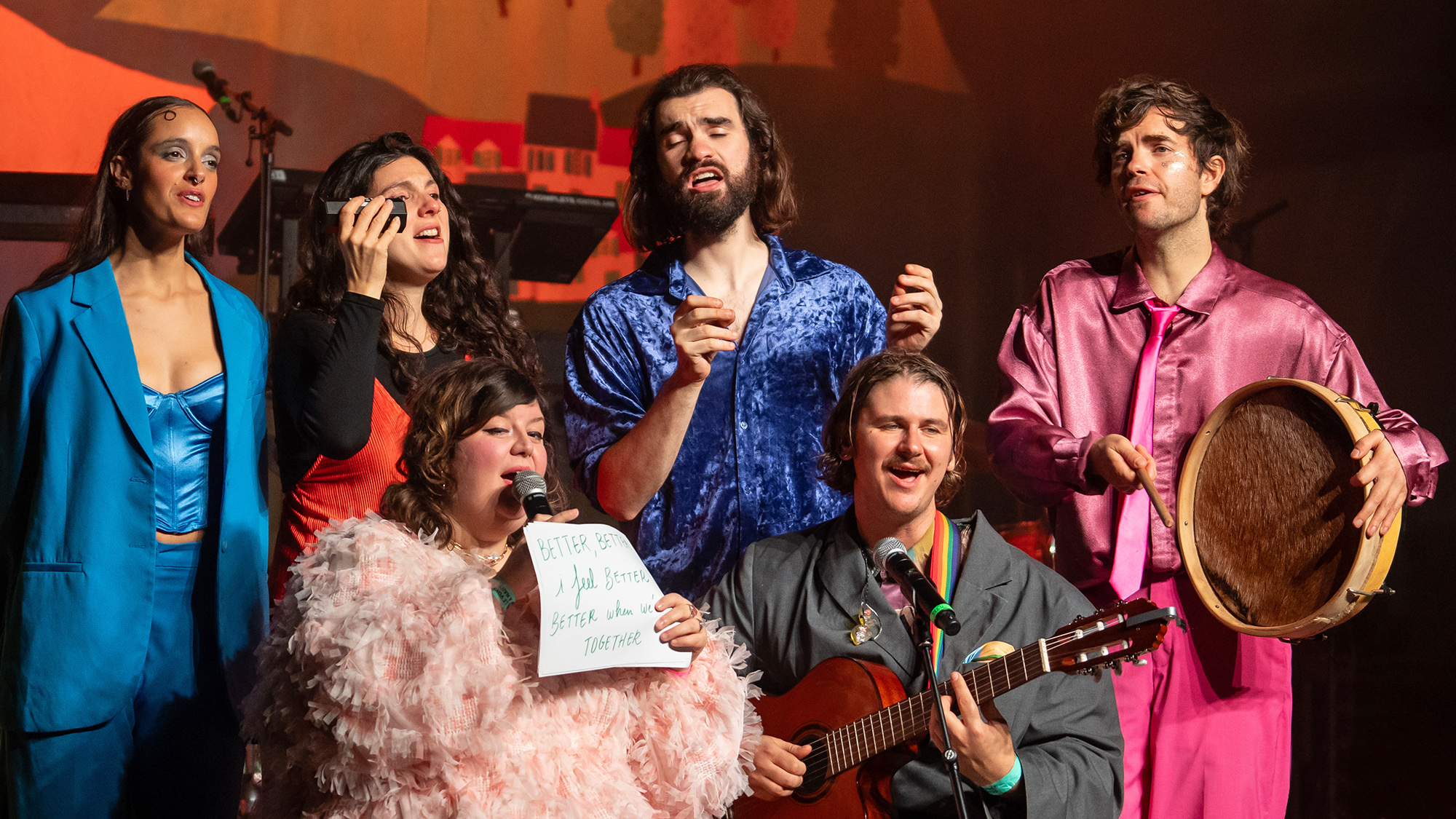
Voyou (bottom right) performing with November Ultra as a member of Elephanz

Under the name Voyou, Vanhooland released "Seul sur ton tandem" on 1 December 2017. He released his debut album on 15 February 2019. The album, entitled Les bruits de la ville, was met with positive reviews. His early recordings introduced a style combining French pop and electronic influences. Following the album's release, Voyou continued touring while also collaborating with artists including Vincent Delerm.

Voyou released his second studio album, Les royaumes minuscules, in 2023. The album continued his combination of French pop, orchestral arrangements and influences from Brazilian and soul music. The release was followed by festival appearances and concerts around France.

== Discography ==
=== Studio albums ===
Title	Details	Peak chart positions
Title	Details	FRA
Les bruits de la ville	Released: 15 February 2019; Label: Entreprise	139
Des confettis en désordre	Released: 18 September 2020; Label: Entreprise	—
Chroniques terrestres, Vol.1	Released: 19 February 2021; Label: Entreprise	—
Les royaumes minuscules	Released: 24 February 2023; Label: Entreprise	143
Henri Salvador est un Voyou	Released: 31 January 2025; Label: Entreprise	—
Chroniques terrestres, Vol.2	Released: 12 June 2026; Label: Entreprise	—

=== Extended plays ===
Title	Details
On s'emmène avec toi	Released: 26 January 2018; Label: Entreprise
Seul	Released: 19 April 2024; Label: Entreprise
