= ...vous aiment =

...Vous aiment

Studio album by Les Wampas
- Released: 30 April 1990
- Genre: Punk rock
- Length: 36:15

Les Wampas chronology
Chauds, sales et humides (1988)	...Vous aiment (1990)	Simple et tendre (1993)

...Vous aiment is the third album by the French rock group Les Wampas, released in 1990.

== Track listing ==
No.	Title	Length
1.	"Intro Wagner"	0:07
2.	"Puta"	1:42
3.	"Eccl.5:1"	3:05
4.	"Surfin'love"	2:40
5.	"C'est facile de se moquer"	2:53
6.	"Petite fille"	2:39
7.	"Le costume violet"	3:52
8.	"Wo How Wo Ho Wo"	1:41
9.	"Ca tourne"	0:23
10.	"Tataratatata"	1:12
11.	"Je n'suis pas fou"	3:19
12.	"Vie, mort et resurrection d'un papillon"	3:18
13.	"Ce soir, c'est Noël"	1:49
14.	"Quand j'étais p'tit"	2:08
15.	"L'éternel"	1:54
16.	"Quelle joie le rock'n'roll"	3:33
