= Les Wriggles =

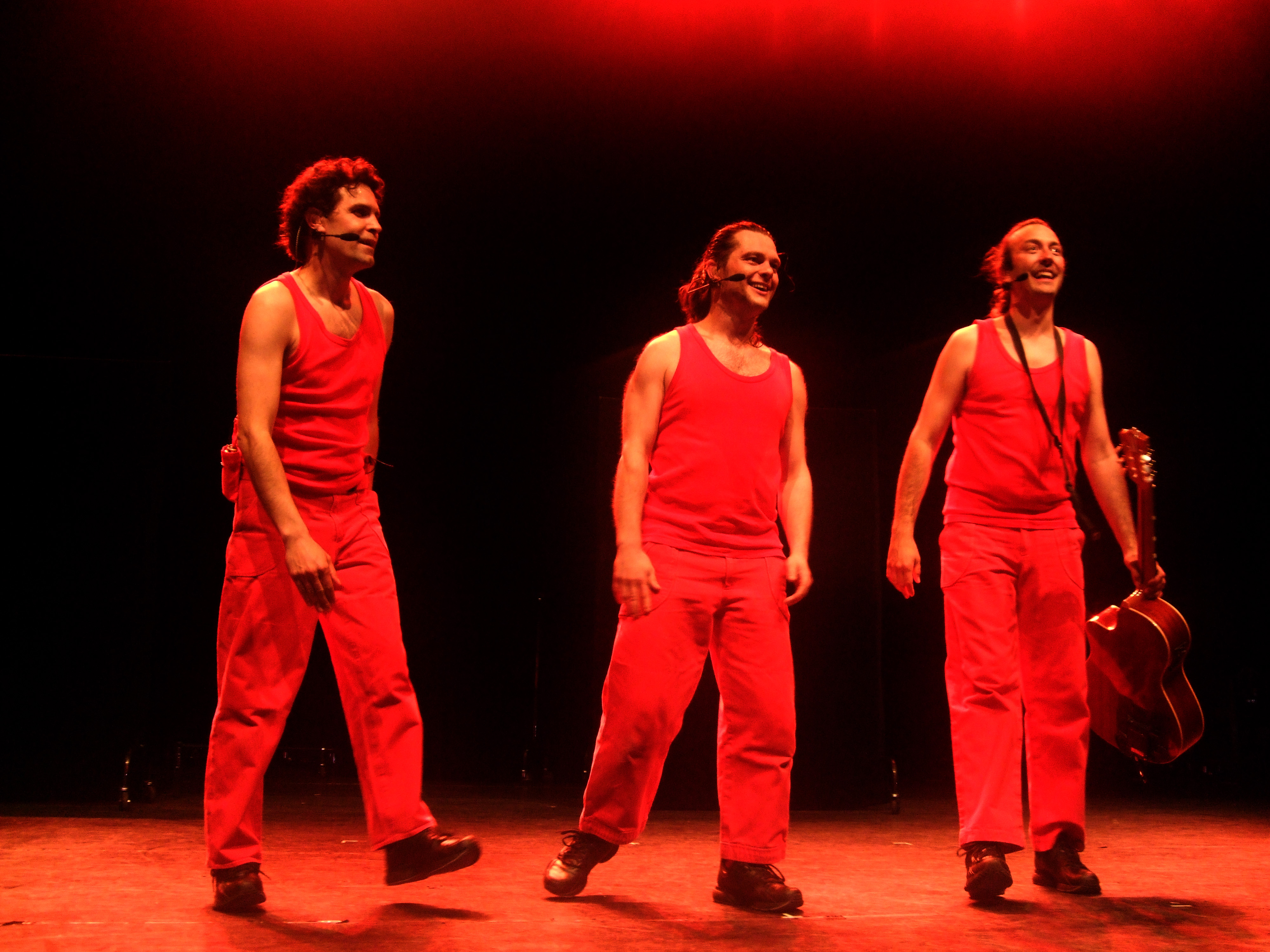
- Les Wriggles in 2009

Background information
- Origin: France
- Genres: French chanson
- Years active: 1995–2019
- Past members: 1995–2009: Christophe Gendreau; Stéphane Gourdon; Frédéric Volovitch 1995–2006; Antoine Réjasse; Franck Zerbib

Les Wriggles (French pronunciation: [le ʁiɡœlz]) are a French band that formed in 1995 made up of five members, Christophe Gendreau, Stéphane Gourdon, Frédéric Volovitch, Antoine Réjasse, and Franck Zerbib. They wear red clothes throughout their concerts. In September 2006, Réjasse and Zerbib left the band to pursue solo careers rendering it a trio. In 2001, Frédéric Volovitch formed a side project with his brother Olivier Volovitch known as Volo, without quitting the band.

== Other projects ==
- Frédéric Volovitch was involved in a side project with his brother Olivier called Volo since 2001 but stayed with Les Wriggles until final break-up
- Stephane Gourdon was also involved in a solo project with the stage named Noof.

== Discography ==
=== Albums ===
- Justice avec des saucisses (1997)
- Les Wriggles partent en live (1999)
- Ah bah ouais mais bon (2002)
- Moi d'abord (2005)
- Tant pis! Tant mieux! (2007)
- En tournez (Live) (2009)
- Complètement red (2019)

== DVDs ==
- Les Wriggles à la Cigale (2003)
- Les Wriggles: Acte V au Trianon (2005)
- Les Wriggles en TourNez (2009)

== See also ==
- Don't confuse this band with "The Wiggles", a children's musical group formed in Sydney
