= Les Wampas =

French punk rock/psychobilly band

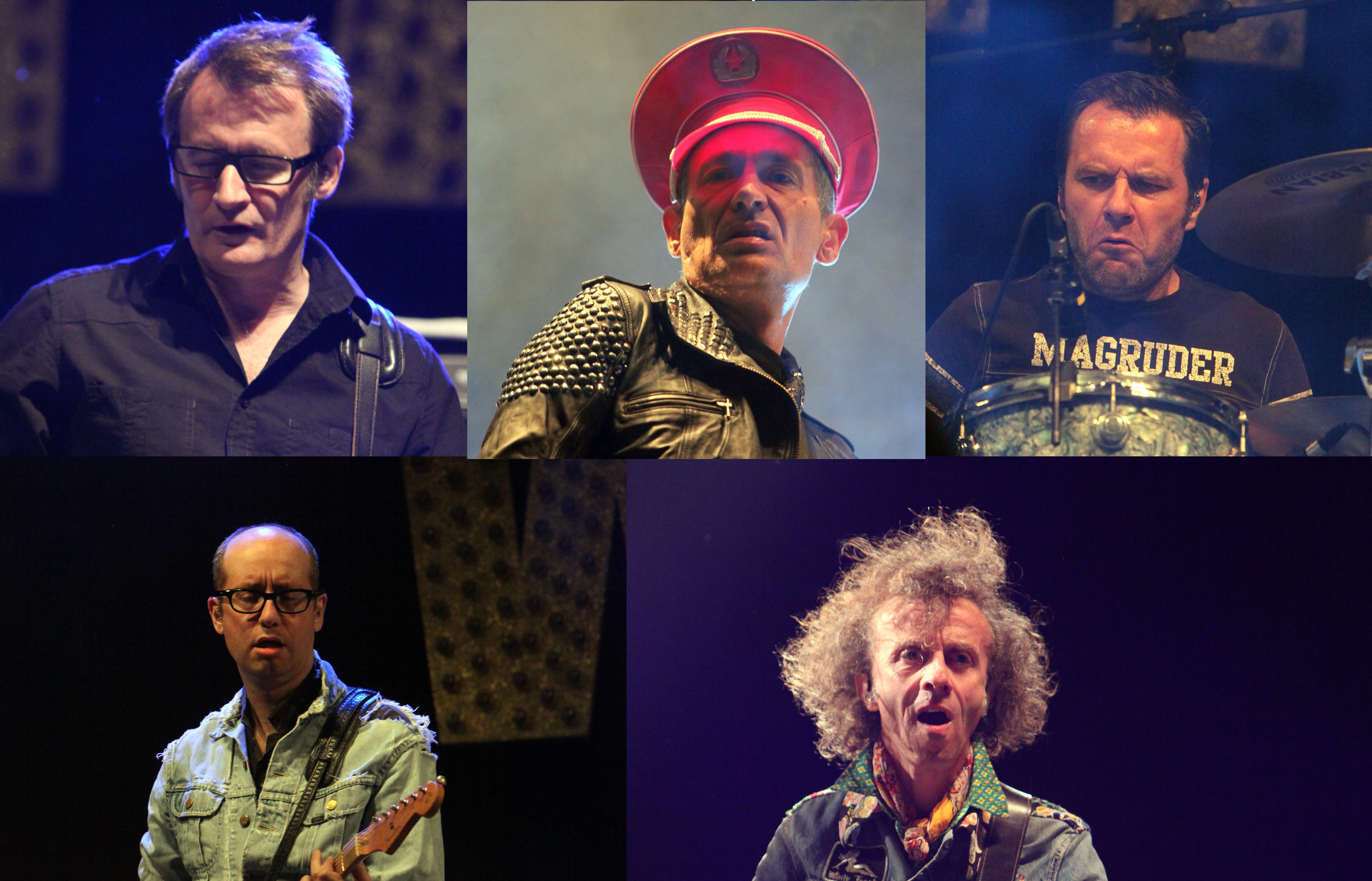
- Les Wampas at Balelec 2011. Clockwise from top left:Jean-Mi Lejoux (bass), Didier Wampas (lead vocals), Niko Wampas (drums), Tony Truant (guitar), Philippe Almosnino (guitar)

Background information
- Origin: Paris, France
- Genres: Punk rock, Pop-punk, "Yé-yé-punk", Psychobilly
- Years active: 1983–present
- Labels: BMG, Atmosphériques
- Members: Didier Wampas; Jean-Mi Lejoux; Tony Truant; Niko Wampas; Effello
- Past members: include Marc Police (deceased); Ben Sam; Phil Almosnino
- Website: www.wampas.com

Les Wampas (French pronunciation: [le vɑ̃pas]) are a French punk rock/psychobilly band, who refer more exactly to their music as "Yé-yé-punk". The band was formed in Paris in 1983.

== History ==
See also Discography

The band's first album, Tutti Frutti was released in 1986. Their third album, Les Wampas vous aiment (Les Wampas love you), released in 1990, contained the popular single "Petite Fille", whose video was played on French TV channel M6, and also includes crowd favorites "Ce soir c'est Noël" (a personal version of the Christmas Carols, available all year long on stage...) and "Quelle joie le rock'n'roll".

Following this album's release they were signed by the major label BMG. However, a shadow was cast across the band for many years when guitarist Marc Police committed suicide in December 1991.

=== Simple et Tendre ===
Simple et tendre (1993) was recorded at London's Roundhouse and Abbey Road studios and featured the London Session Orchestra.

Recorded one year after guitarist Marc Police's suicide and probably their most inspired album, it includes a heart-breaking, breathtaking — and yet hilarious — tribute song to their friend ("Les îles au soleil", "Islands under the sun").

The video to the band's "Comme un ange (qui pleure)" (1992) was directed by Michel Gondry.

=== Never trust a guy... and "Manu Chao" ===
Having been back on the 'independent circuit' since their contract with BMG ended in 1998, Les Wampas released the single "Manu Chao" in 2003. It, along with the album's full title, Never trust a guy who after having been a punk, is now playing electro, made fun of Manu Chao, who was a member of the successful punk band Mano Negra in the early 1990s (like Wampas guitarist Jo Dahan), but who now, according to Didier Wampas, "had accepted the system. You're inside of it, you profit from it, you're not going to criticize it 'on the side', or else you might not get back in."

With a riff similar to The Ramones' "I Wanna Be Sedated", Manu Chao was the band's most popular single to date, reaching number 20 in France in June 2003 and features as a bonus track in the European version of Rock Band.

Les Wampas played at the Eurockéennes and Vieilles Charrues festivals in that year, and a rockumentary about them, For the rock, was made in 2004.

=== Rock'n'Roll Part 9 ===
On Rock'n'Roll Part 9, Les Wampas' ninth album (not including two live albums), they released the controversial single "Chirac en prison" in January 2006. The song contains the lyrics:

"Elle ne pense qu'à ça, elle n'en dort plus la nuit [...]
La seule chose qui lui ferait plaisir
Ce serait de voir Chirac en prison."

"She thinks only of this, she doesn't sleep anymore at night [...]
The only thing that would give her pleasure
Would be to see Chirac in prison."

However, Didier Wampas said, "It isn't really a song against Chirac [...] I just wanted to see how far freedom of expression can go". "Chirac en prison" was mainly banned upon its release by French TV and radio; some TV advertisements for the single were even populated with bleeps and on-screen rectangles, to disguise the fact that the song was about the president. It was played by radio stations Ouï FM and Le Mouv', however, and achieved much more publicity when Les Guignols de l'info, a satirical puppet show on Canal+ television, made a video for the song.

"Rimini" was the most notable success from Rock'n'Roll Part 9. This song has become widely popular among the fans. It is about the death of the famous Italian cyclist Marco Pantani who was found dead in an hotel of the Italian seaside resort of Rimini.

=== 2007 Eurovision entry ===
Les Wampas competed against nine other popular French acts for the chance of representing France at the Eurovision Song Contest 2007, with a song called "Faut voter pour nous" ("You gotta vote for us"), but did not win the vote.

== Members ==
Current members

- Didier Wampas, frontman and lead (vocals)
- Jean-Mi Lejoux (bass, ex-Les Satellites)
- Effello (guitar)
- Niko Wampas (drums)
- Tony Truant (guitar, ex-Dogs)

Past members

- Marc Police (deceased) - (guitar)
- Ben Sam (bass)
- Jo Dahan (guitar)
- Phil Almosnino (guitar)

=== Didier Wampas ===
The group is best known for its frontman and also main lyricist and singer Didier Wampas (real name Didier Chapedelaine). He deliberately sings off-key and often high-pitched, hence his recognizable voice. His on-stage energy, and crowd surfing, hoisted and hauled up on garden chairs, are major features of the band's live shows, which frequently end up in a complete mess, Didier Wampas singing among the audience, and a large part of the audience going onto the stage. Since the release of the album Kiss (2000), he comes to hug members of the audience at the end of the show and kiss them goodbye on each cheek.

In interviews, Didier Wampas often repeats that he earns approximately a quarter of his private incomes from his activity as a singer, and the rest from his job as a mechanic at the RATP (public transportation service in Paris), which he kept in spite of the increasing fame and success of the band. He frequently asserts his opposition to the French system of giving grants to professionals in the performing arts — this attitude is unusual in the French culture.

In October 2011, Didier Wampas released his first solo album entitled Taisez moi (Silence me) which was recorded in Los Angeles and Brussels with musicians Ryan Ross (Ex Panic! at the Disco), Nick Johns and Kevin Harp. The album included the songs "Chanteur de droite" (a defense of the French singer Michel Sardou) and "Karmann"; a tribute to deceased ex-guitarist Marc Police. In May 2012, he announced his retirement from the RATP on French TV.

In January 2013, Didier began recording his second solo album entitled Comme dans une garage (Like in a garage) at Toerag Studios in London with the Bikini Machine. It was released in April 2013 credited to "Didier Wampas & Bikini Machine". He also performs and records under the name "Sugar and Tiger", a band composed of various members of his family including his two sons.

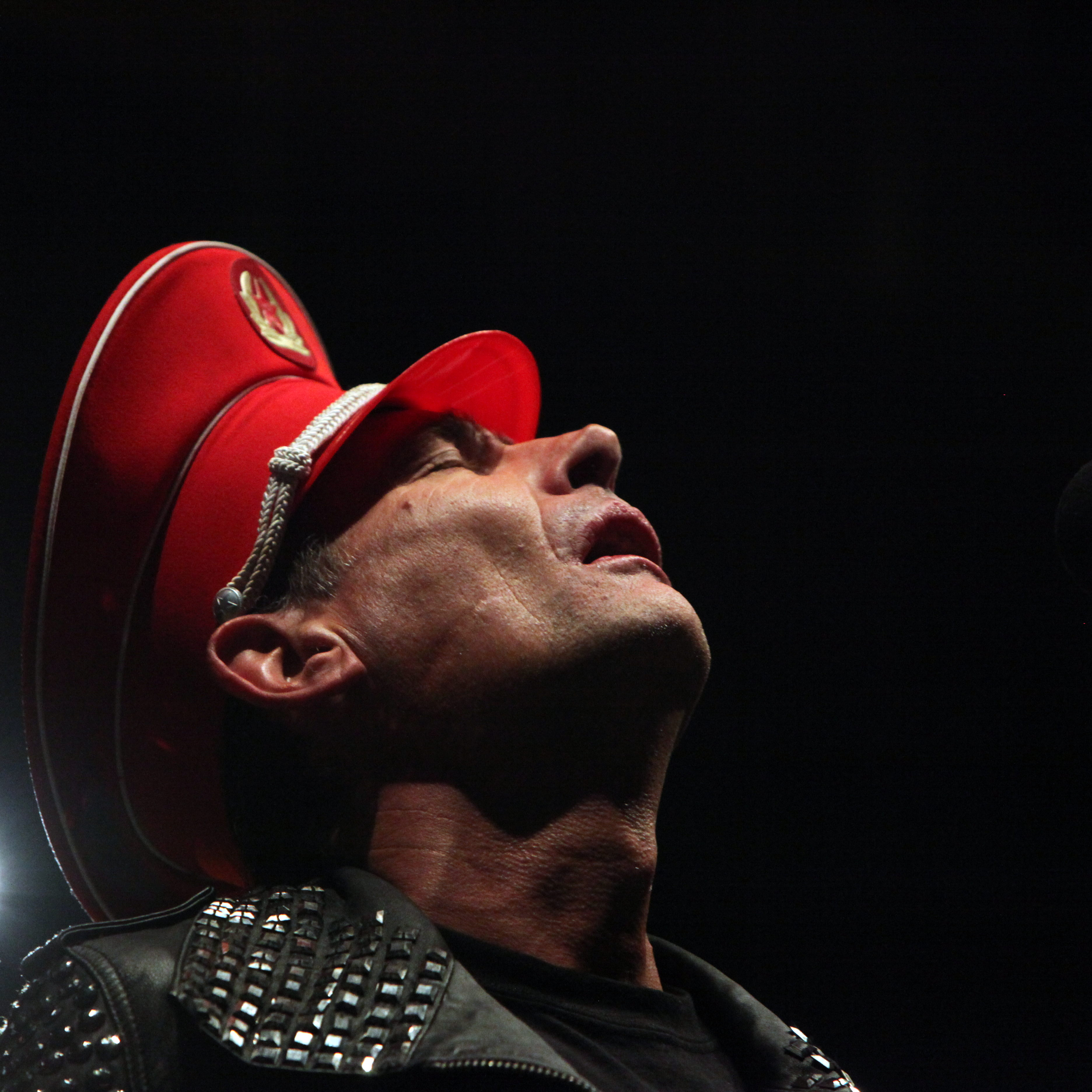
Didier Wampas (singer, guitar)

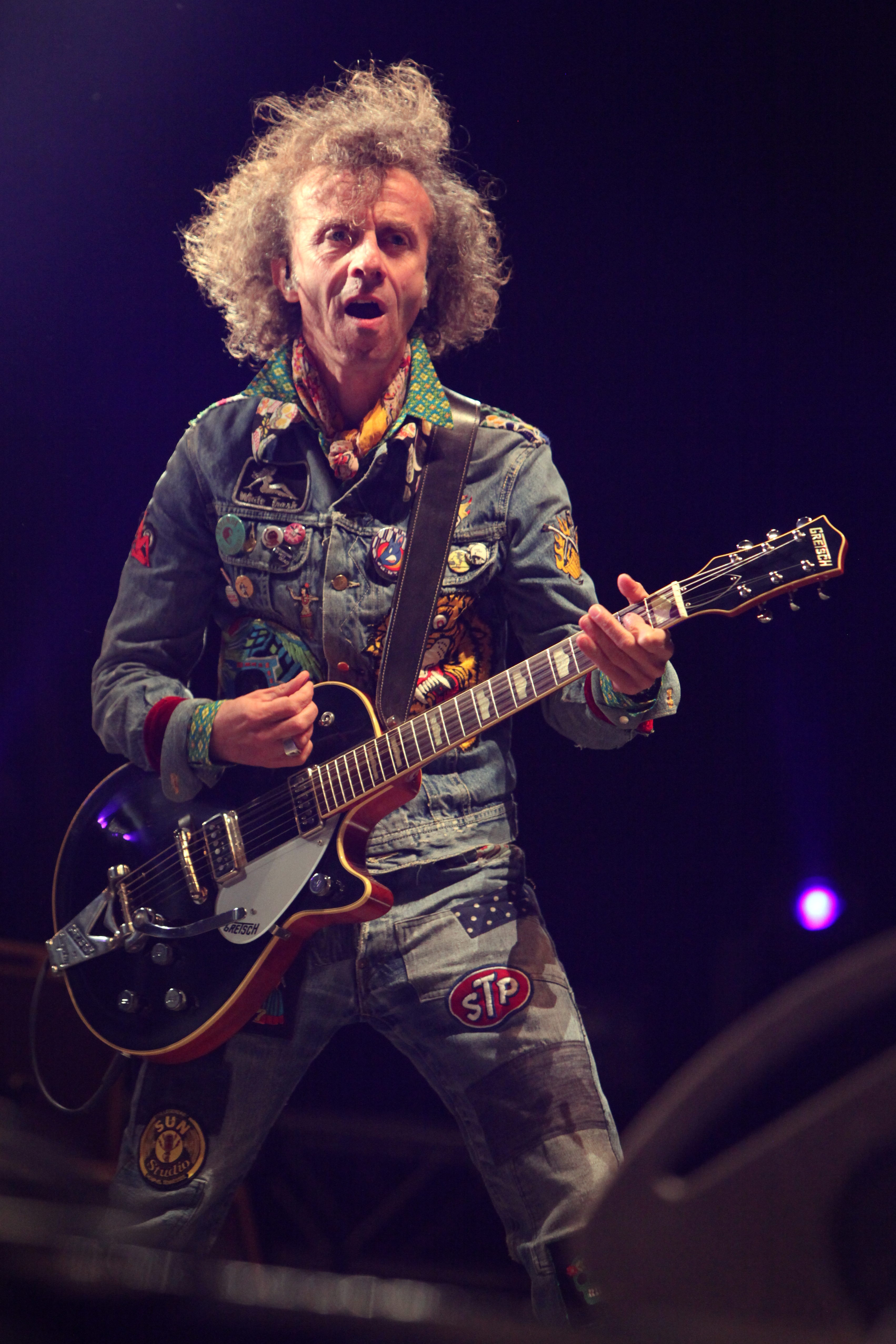
Tony Truant (guitar)

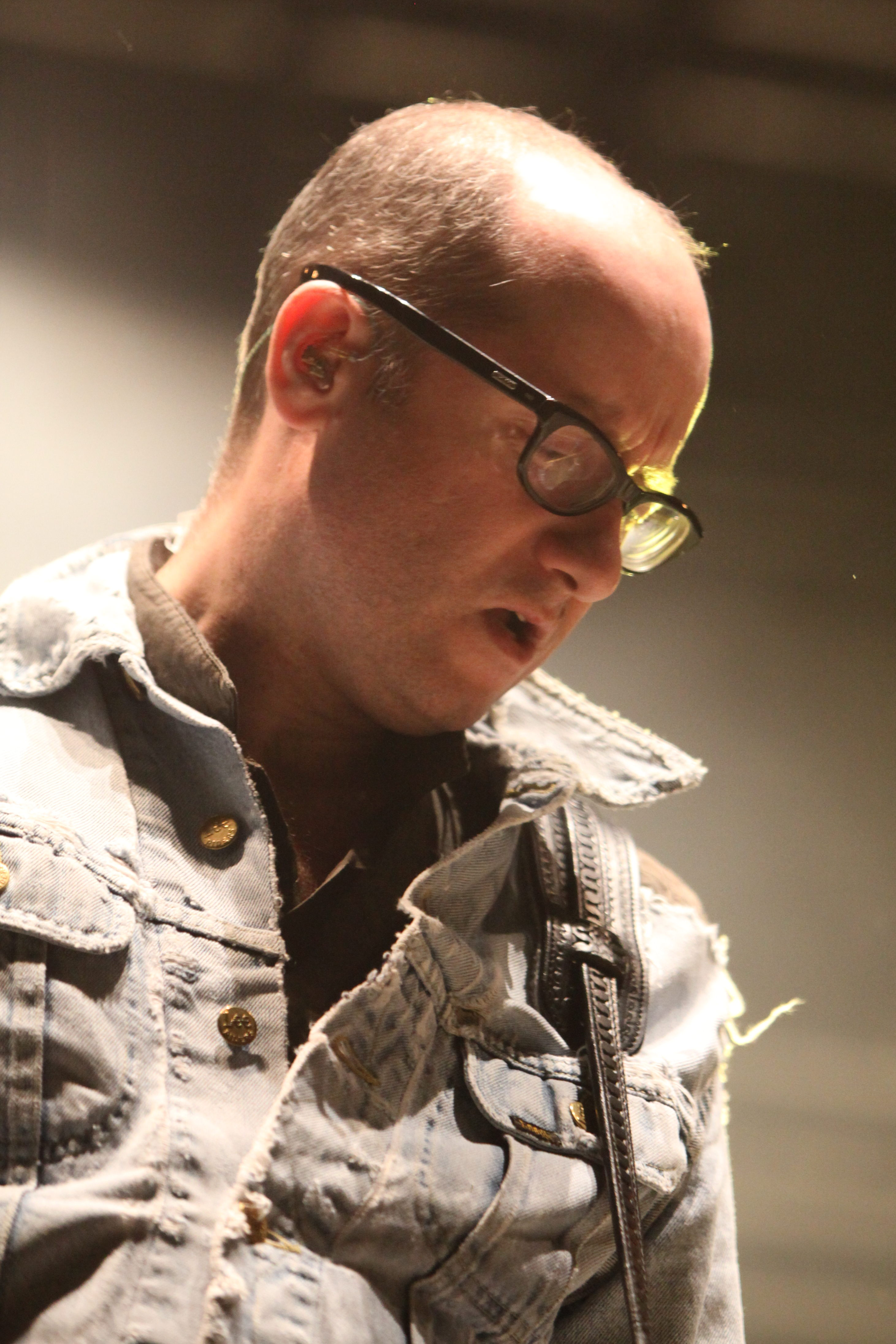
Philippe Almosnino (guitar)

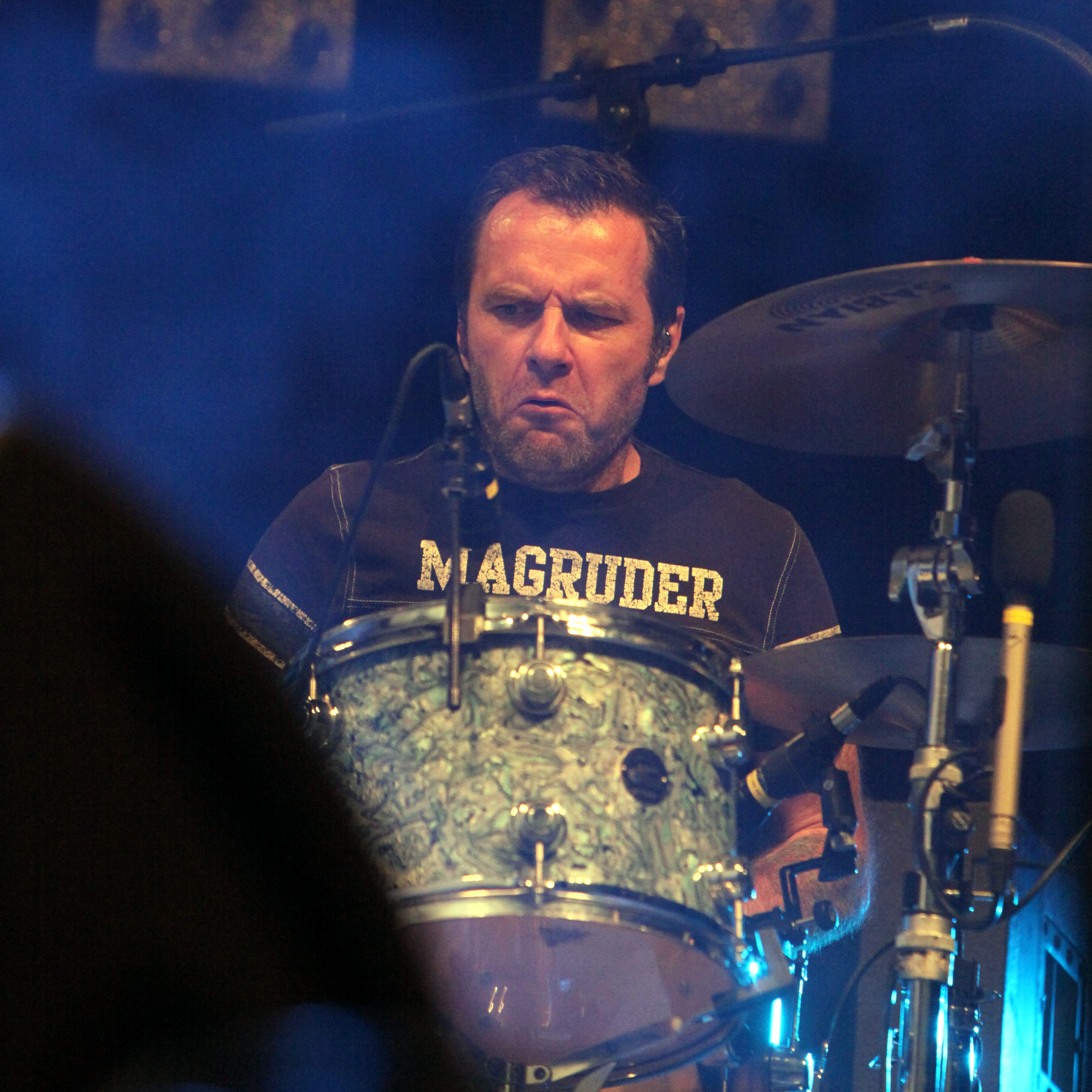
Niko (drums)

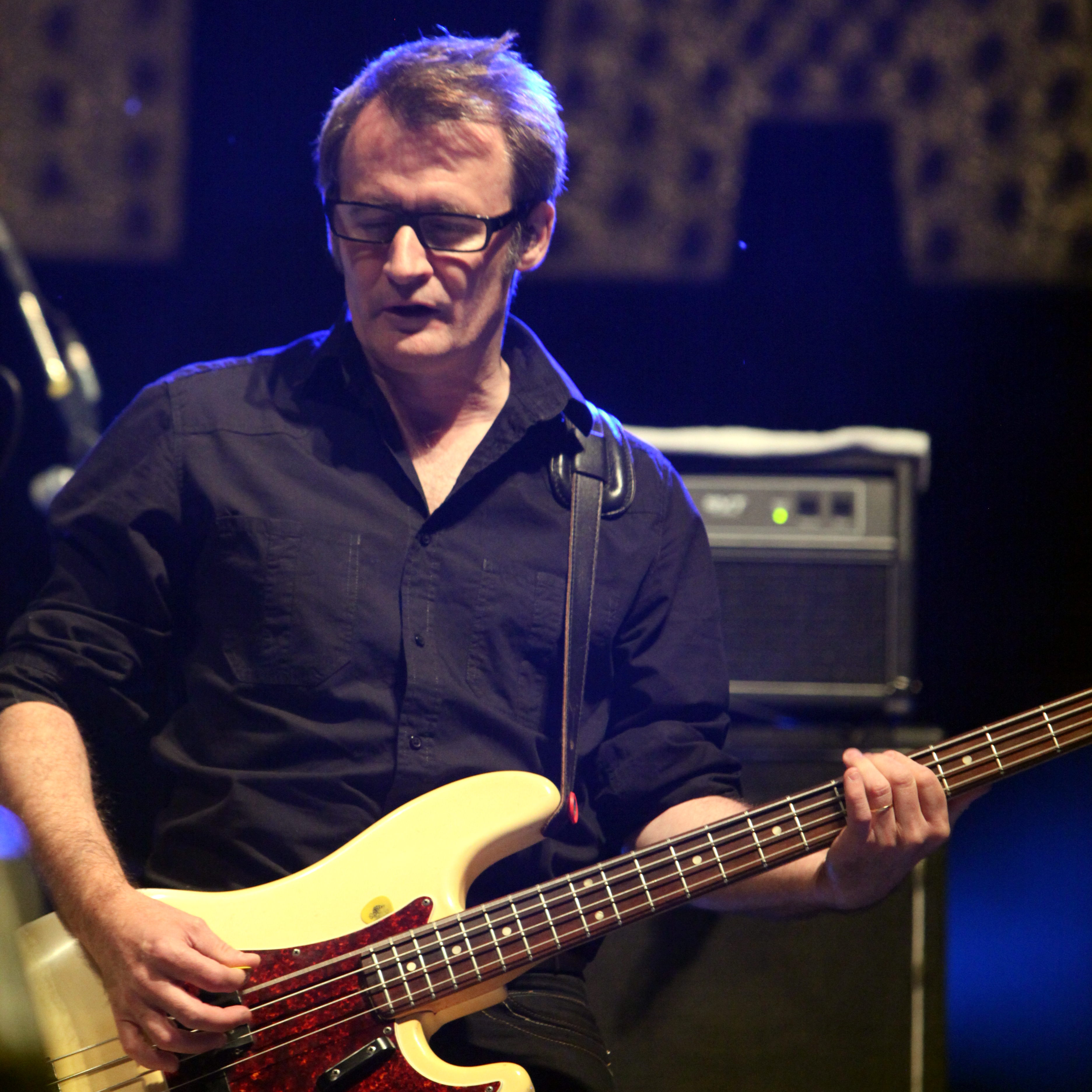
Jean-Michel Lejoux (bass)

== International reputation ==
Simple et tendre (1993) was recorded in London; Les Wampas vous aiment and Never trust a guy... both had English producers, Andy Lydon and Clive Martin respectively, and Trop précieux was recorded in Austin, Texas. In 2008, the band headed off to Sweden at Pelle Gunnerfeldt's (The Hives) to record Les Wampas sont la preuve que Dieu existe released in 2009.

Les Wampas have toured in most western European countries, as well as Quebec, Japan, India, and La Réunion. However, they had never played in English-speaking Canada or Great Britain, until January 2013 when Didier played a solo show the Paris is Burning show at the Lexington, London. They only played once in the United States (in Austin, April 1995).

Commercial success has mainly been in France, Les Wampas mainly singing in French.

== Famous phrases/Glossary ==
- Les Wampas ont inventé le rock'n'roll - "Les Wampas invented rock 'n' roll"
- Didier Wampas est le roi ! ! - "Didier Wampas is the king", the main message from the song Oï !, and a classic shout of cheer, from the audience, while in public.
- Tout à fond ("everything up to the max") - this is a phrase the band often say: the first words we hear on the album Les Wampas vous aiment are "le rock, c'est tout à fond!" ("rock is everything cranked up to the max"); the name of their 1997 live album is Toutafonlive.
- Chicoutimi - Les Wampas played a memorable show in Chicoutimi, Quebec, and named their 1998 album after the town.

== Discography ==
=== Albums ===
Studio albums

- 1986: Tutti frutti
- 1990: Les Wampas vous aiment (The Wampas love you)
- 1993: Simple et tendre (Simple and tender)
- 1996: Trop précieux (Too precious)
- 1998: Chicoutimi
- 2000: Kiss
- 2003; Never trust a guy who after having been a punk, is now playing electro
- 2006: Rock'n'Roll Part 9
- 2009: Les Wampas sont la preuve que Dieu existe (The Wampas are the proof that god exists)
- 2014: Les Wampas font la gueule (The Wampas pull faces)
- 2017: Evangelisti
- 2022: Tempête, tempête (Tempest, tempest)

Live albums

- 1988: Chauds, sales et humides (live album, but with previously unreleased songs)
- 1997: Toutafonlive
- 2004: Never trust a live! (also released as DVD)

Solo Didier Wampas

- 2011: Taisez moi

Collaboration - Didier Wampas & Bikini Machine

- 2013: Comme dans une garage
