= Victoires de la Musique =

Annual French music award

- Awarded for: Outstanding achievements in the music industry
- Country: France
- Presented by: French Ministry of Culture
- First award: 1985
- Website: lesvictoiresdelamusique.fr

Television/radio coverage
- Network: France Televisions

Victoires de la Musique (French pronunciation: [viktwar də la myzik]; English: Victories of Music) are an annual French award ceremony where the Victoire accolade is delivered by the French Ministry of Culture to recognize outstanding achievement in the music industry. The classical and jazz versions are the Victoires de la musique classique and Victoires du Jazz.

The annual presentation ceremony features performances by prominent artists, some of the awards of more popular interest are presented in a widely viewed televised ceremony. The awards are the French equivalent to the Grammy Awards and the Brit Awards for music, and it is one of the major awards in France, along with Nuits des Molières for stage performances, and the César Award for motion pictures.

The first Victoires de la Musique ceremony was held in 1985, and it was set up to honor musical accomplishments by performers for the year 1985.

== Background ==
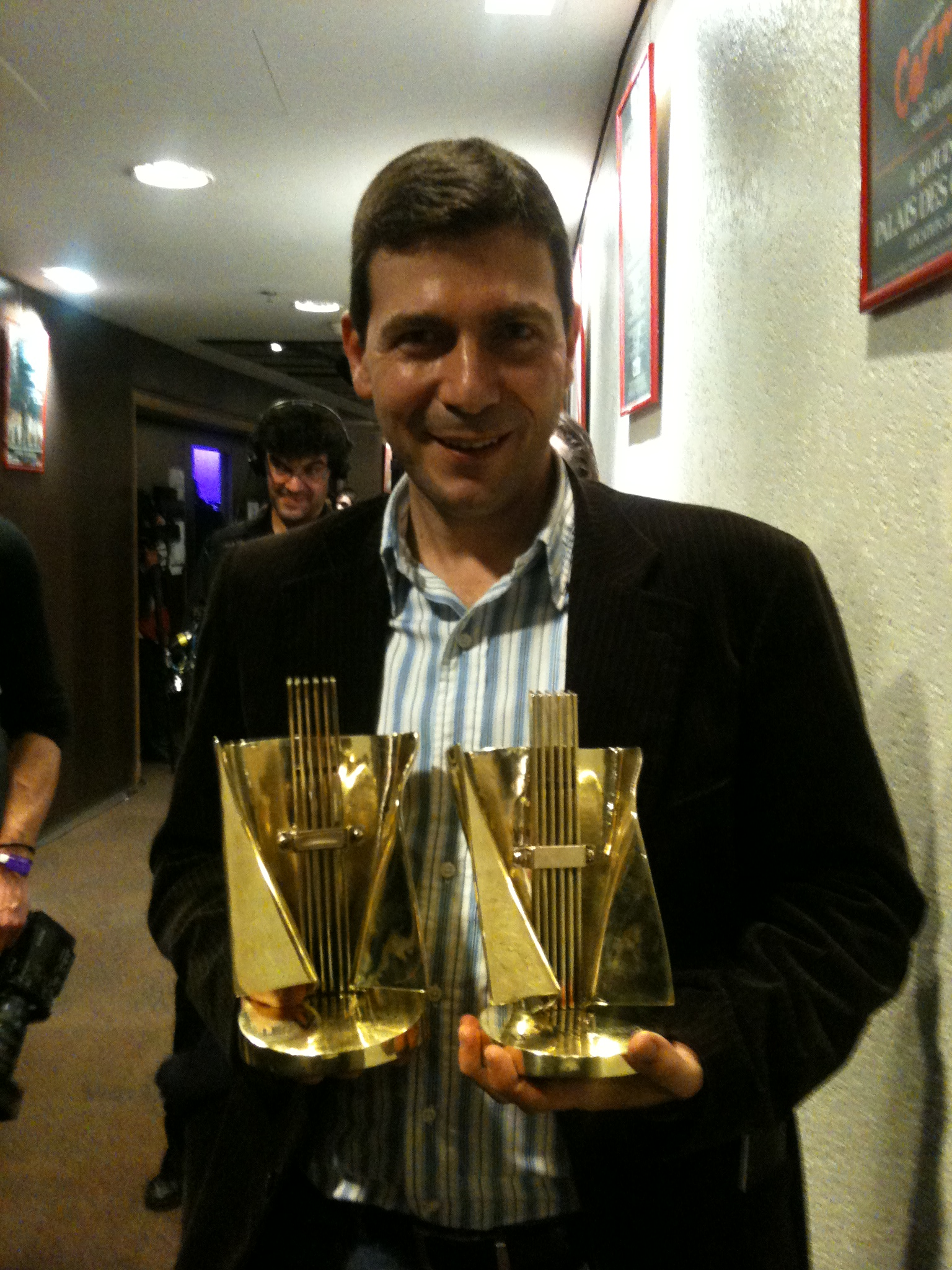
Jean-Marc Laurent at the 2012 ceremony

The title trophies and nominees for each are established annually by the Board of Directors of the Association "Les Victoires de la Musique", which also refers to people who make up the Academy voters. In 2010, the Victoires were awarded by a panel of 1 226 professionals (musicians, artists, writers, composers, producers, record stores, video directors, sound engineers and critics) in a vote in one round. Of the voters, 40% are artists (performers, but also musicians, writers, composers ...), 40% are professional music producers and 20% are of other professional circles close to the world of music (agents artists, music stores, music critics, radio programmers ...). In recent years, some trophies are awarded by the public, through SMS voting, and since 2009, Internet: Victory "Group or Artist of the public revelation of the year" and that the "Song of the year".

== Categories ==
=== Group of the Year ===
(Starting 2001, replaced by Male Group or Artist of the Year / Female Group or Artist of the Year)

- 1988 : Kassav'
- 1990 : Gipsy Kings
- 1991 : Elmer Food Beat
- 1992 : MC Solaar
- 1993 : Pow woW
- 1994 : Les Innocents
- 1995 : IAM
- 1996 : Les Innocents (second award)
- 1997 : Les Innocents (third award)
- 1998 : Noir Désir
- 1999 : Louise Attaque
- 2000 : Zebda

=== Male Artist of the Year ===
- 1985 : Michel Jonasz
- 1986 : Jean-Jacques Goldman
- 1987 : Johnny Hallyday
- 1988 : Claude Nougaro
- 1990 : Francis Cabrel
- 1991 : Michel Sardou
- 1992 : Patrick Bruel
- 1993 : Alain Bashung
- 1994 : Alain Souchon
- 1995 : MC Solaar
- 1996 : Maxime Le Forestier
- 1997 : Charles Aznavour
- 1998 : Florent Pagny
- 1999 : Alain Bashung (second award)
- 2000 : -M-

==== Male Group or Artist of the Year ====
(Replacing Male Artist of the Year and Group of the Year)

- 2001 : Henri Salvador
- 2002 : Gérald De Palmas
- 2003 : Renaud
- 2004 : Calogero
- 2005 : -M- (second award)
- 2006 : Raphael
- 2007 : Bénabar
- 2008 : Abd Al Malik
- 2009 : Alain Bashung (third award)
- 2010 : Benjamin Biolay
- 2011 : Gaëtan Roussel
- 2012 : Hubert-Félix Thiéfaine
- 2013 : Dominique A
- 2014 : Stromae
- 2015 : Julien Doré
- 2016 : Vianney
- 2017 : Renaud (2nd award)
- 2018 : Orelsan
- 2019 : Bigflo & Oli

=== Female Artist of the Year ===
- 1985 : Jeanne Mas
- 1986 : Catherine Lara
- 1987 : France Gall
- 1988 : Mylène Farmer
- 1990 : Vanessa Paradis
- 1991 : Patricia Kaas
- 1992 : Jane Birkin
- 1993 : Véronique Sanson
- 1994 : Barbara
- 1995 : Celine Dion
- 1996 : Véronique Sanson (second award)
- 1997 : Barbara (second award)
- 1998 : Zazie
- 1999 : Axelle Red
- 2000 : Natacha Atlas

==== Female Group or Artist of the Year ====
(Replacing Female Artist of the Year and Group of the Year)

- 2001 : Hélène Ségara
- 2002 : Zazie (second award)
- 2003 : Lynda Lemay
- 2004 : Carla Bruni
- 2005 : Françoise Hardy
- 2006 : Juliette
- 2007 : Olivia Ruiz
- 2008 : Vanessa Paradis (second award)
- 2009 : Camille
- 2010 : Olivia Ruiz (second award)
- 2011 : Aṣa
- 2012 : Catherine Ringer
- 2013 : Lou Doillon
- 2014 : Vanessa Paradis (third award)
- 2015 : Christine and the Queens
- 2016 : Yael Naim
- 2017 : Jain
- 2018 : Charlotte Gainsbourg
- 2019 : Jeanne Added

=== Foreign Artist of the Year ===
- 1985 : Tina Turner (United States)

=== Francophone Artist or Artist of the Year ===
- 1994 : Maurane (Belgium)
- 1995 : Khaled (Algeria)
- 1996 : Céline Dion (Canada)
- 1997 : Teri Moïse (United States / Haiti)

=== Electronic/Dance Artist of the Year ===
- 2009 : Martin Solveig
- 2010 : Birdy Nam Nam
- 2011 : Stromae

=== Révélation (Newcomer) ===
==== Popular Music Révélation of the Year ====
- 1985 : Jeanne Mas
- 1986 : Gold

==== Popular Music Female Révélation of the Year ====
- 1987 : Guesch Patti
- 1988 : Patricia Kaas
- 1990 : Corinne Hermès
- 1991 : Liane Foly
- 1992 : Jil Caplan
- 1993 : Zazie
- 1994 : Nina Morato
- 1995 : Rachel Des Bois
- 1996 : Stephend

==== Popular Music Male Révélation of the Year ====
- 1987 : L'Affaire Louis Trio
- 1988 : Florent Pagny
- 1990 : Philippe Lafontaine
- 1991 : Art Mengo
- 1992 : Nilda Fernandez
- 1993 : Arthur H
- 1994 : Thomas Fersen
- 1995 : Gérald de Palmas
- 1996 : Ménélik

==== Group Révélation of the Year ====
- 1994 : Native
- 1995 : Sinclair
- 1996 : Alliance Ethnik

==== Révélation of the Year ====
(Starting 1997 until 2004, replacing three categories Female Révélation of the Year, Male Révélation of the Year and Group Révélation of the Year)
(Starting 2005, replaced by Group or Artist Popular Révélation of the Year)

- 1997 : Juliette
- 1998 : Lara Fabian
- 1999 : Faudel
- 2000 : 113
- 2001 : Isabelle Boulay
- 2002 : Aston Villa
- 2003 : Natasha St-Pier
- 2004 : Kyo

==== Group or Artist Popular Révélation of the Year ====
(Replacing Révélation of the Year)

- 2005 : Jeanne Cherhal
- 2006 : Amel Bent
- 2007 : Miss Dominique
- 2008 : Christophe Maé
- 2009 : Sefyu
- 2010 : Pony Pony Run Run
- 2011 : Lilly Wood and the Prick
- 2012 : Orelsan
- 2013 : C2C
- (Discontinued starting 2014)

==== Group or Artist Stage Révélation of the Year ====
- 2001 : Saint-Germain
- 2002 : Le Peuple de l'Herbe
- 2003 : Sanseverino
- 2004 : Kyo
- 2005 : La Grande Sophie
- 2006 : Camille
- 2007 : Grand Corps Malade
- 2008 : Renan Luce
- 2009 : BB Brunes
- 2010 : Izia
- 2011 : Ben l'Oncle Soul
- 2012 : Brigitte
- 2013 : C2C
- 2014 : Woodkid
- 2015 : Benjamin Clementine
- 2016 : Hyphen Hyphen
- 2017 : L.E.J
- 2018 : Gaël Faye
- 2019 : Clara Luciani

==== Album Révélation of the Year ====
- 2001 : Mieux qu'ici-bas by Isabelle Boulay
- 2002 : Rose Kennedy by Benjamin Biolay
- 2003 : Vincent Delerm by Vincent Delerm
- 2004 : Le Chemin by Kyo
- 2005 : Crèvecœur by Daniel Darc and Le rêve ou la vie by Ridan
- 2006 : Le Fil by Camille
- 2007 : Midi 20 by Grand Corps Malade
- 2008 : Repenti by Renan Luce
- 2009 : Ersatz by Julien Doré
- 2010 : Tree of Life by Yodelice

*Discontinued for period 2011 to 2013

- 2014 : Psycho Tropical Berlin by La Femme
- 2015 : Mini World by Indila
- 2016 : Chambre 12 by Louane
- 2017 : Les Conquêtes by Radio Elvis
- 2018 : Petite Amie by Juliette Armanet
- 2019 : Brol by Angèle

=== Album of the Year ===
==== Album of the Year ====
- 1985 : Love on the Beat by Serge Gainsbourg
- 1986 : Sauver l'amour by Daniel Balavoine
- 1987 : The No Comprendo by Rita Mitsouko
- 1988 : Nougayork by Claude Nougaro
- 1990 : Sarbacane by Francis Cabrel
- 1991 : Nickel by Alain Souchon
- 1992 : Sheller en solitaire by William Sheller
- 1993 : Caché derrière by Laurent Voulzy
- 1994 : Rio Grande by Eddy Mitchell
- 1995 : Samedi soir sur la Terre by Francis Cabrel
- 1996 : Défoule sentimentale by Alain Souchon
- 1997 : Mr Eddy by Eddy Mitchell
- 1998 : L'École du micro d'argent by IAM

*Discontinued and replaced by Song/Variety Album of the Year and Rock Album of the Year

==== Song/Variety Album of the Year ====
- 1999 : Fantaisie militaire by Alain Bashung (as Variety, Pop, Rock Album of the Year)
- 2000 : Sang pour sang by Johnny Hallyday (as Variety, Pop, Rock Album of the Year)
- 2001 : Chambre avec vue by Henri Salvador
- 2002 : Avril by Laurent Voulzy
- 2003 : Boucan d'enfer by Renaud
- 2004 : Les Risques du Métier by Bénabar
- 2005 : Qui de nous deux by -M-
- 2006 : Caravane by Raphael
- 2007 : Le soldat rose by Louis Chedid
- 2008 : Divinidylle by Vanessa Paradis
- 2009 : Bleu pétrole by Alain Bashung
- 2010 : La Superbe by Benjamin Biolay
- 2011 : Causes perdues et musiques tropicales by Bernard Lavilliers
- 2012 : Suppléments de mensonge by Hubert-Félix Thiéfaine
- 2013 : La place du fantôme by La Grande Sophie
- 2014 : Racine carrée (stylised as √) by Stromae
- 2015 : Alain Souchon & Laurent Voulzy by Alain Souchon & Laurent Voulzy
- 2016 : De l'amour by Johnny Hallyday
- 2017 : Palermo Hollywood by Benjamin Biolay
- 2018 : Géopoétique by MC Solaar
- 2019 : En amont by Alain Bashung

==== Rock Album of the Year ====
- 1985 : Un autre monde by Téléphone
- 1986 : Passé le Rio Grande by Alain Bashung

*Discontinued from 1987, returned in 2001

- 2001 : Comme on a dit by Louise Attaque
- 2002 : des Visages des Figures by Noir Désir
- 2003 : Paradize by Indochine
- 2004 : Tu vas pas mourir de rire by Mickey 3D
- 2005 : French bazaar by Arno
- 2006 : À plus tard crocodile by Louise Attaque (second award)
- 2007 : Wow by Superbus
- 2008 : L'Invitation by Étienne Daho
- 2009 : L'Homme du monde by Arthur H
- 2010 : Izia by Izia
- 2011 : Ginger by Gaëtan Roussel
- 2012 : So Much Trouble by Izia (second award)
- 2013 : Can Be Late by Skip the Use
- 2014 : Bankrupt! by Phoenix
- 2015 : Shake Shook Shaken by The Dø
- 2016 : Mandarine by Les Innocents
- 2017 : Anomalie by Louise Attaque (third award)
- 2018 : The Evol' by Shaka Ponk
- 2019 : Radiate by Jeanne Added

==== Francophone Album of the Year ====
- 1985 : Ils s'aiment by Daniel Lavoie (Canada)
- 1986 : Faire à nouveau connaissance by Diane Tell (Canada)
- 1987 : Vue sur la mer by Daniel Lavoie (Canada) (second award)
- 1988 : Awaba Beach by Mory Kante (Guinea)
- 1990 : Hélène by Roch Voisine (Canada)
- 1991 : Double by Roch Voisine (Canada) (second award)
- 1992 : Engelberg by Stephan Eicher (Switzerland)

==== Pop/Rock Album of the Year ====
- 2003 : Paradize by Indochine
- 2004 : Tu vas pas mourir de rire by Mickey 3D
- 2005 : French bazaar by Arno Hintjens
- 2006 : A plus tard crocodile by Louise Attaque
- 2007 : Wow by Superbus
- 2008 : L'Invitation by Etienne Daho
- 2009 : L'Homme du monde by Arthur H
- 2010 : Izia by Izia

==== Traditional or World Music ====
===== Traditional Music Album of the Year =====
- 1992 : Nouvelles polyphonies corses
- 1994 : Renaud cante el Nord by Renaud
- 1995 : Polyphonies by Voce Di Corsica
- 1996 : Dan Ar Braz et les 50 musiciens de l'Héritage des Celtes en concert by Dan Ar Braz and l'Héritage des Celtes
- 1997 : I Muvrini à Bercy by I Muvrini

===== Traditional Music/World Music Album of the Year =====
- 1998 : Finisterres by Dan Ar Braz and l'Héritage des Celtes
- 1999 : Clandestino by Manu Chao
- 2000 : Café Atlántico by Cesária Évora
- 2001 : Made in Medina by Rachid Taha
- 2002 : Proxima estación? Esperanza by Manu Chao
- 2003 : Umani by I Muvrini tied with Françafrique by Tiken Jah Fakoly
- 2004 : Voz d'amor by Cesária Évora
- 2005 : Dimanche à Bamako by Amadou & Mariam

===== World Music Album of the Year =====
- 2006 : Mesk Elil by Souad Massi
- 2007 : Canta by Agnès Jaoui
- 2008 : Yael Naim by Yael Naïm
- 2009 : Tchamantché by Rokia Traoré
- 2010 : La Différence by Salif Keita
- 2011 : Handmade by Hindi Zahra
- 2012 : Cantina Paradise by Jehro
- 2013 : Folila by Amadou & Mariam
- 2014 : Illusions by Ibrahim Maalouf
- 2015 : Rivière noire by Rivière noire
- 2016 : Homeland by Hindi Zahra
- 2017 : Far From Home by Calypso Rose
- 2018 : Lamomali by Lamomali (-M-, Toumani Diabaté, Sidiki Diabaté, Fatoumata Diawara)
- 2019 : LOST by Camélia Jordana

==== Urban music (various) ====
- 1999 : Panique celtique by Manau (as Rap/Groove Album of the Year)
- 2000 : Les Princes de la ville by 113 (as Rap, Reggae or Groove Album of the Year)
- 2001 : J'fais c'que j'veux by Pierpoljak (as Rap, Reggae or Groove Album of the Year)
- 2002 : X raisons by Saïan Supa Crew (as Rap/Hip-Hop Album of the Year)
- 2003 : Solitaire by Doc Gynéco (as Rap/Hip-Hop Album of the Year)
- 2004 : Brut de femme by Diam's (as Rap/Hip-Hop Album of the Year)
- 2005 : 16/9 by Nâdiya (as Rap/Hip-Hop/R&B Album of the Year)
- 2006 : Les Histoires extraordinaires d'un jeune de banlieue - Disiz la Peste (as Rap/Ragga/Hip-Hop/R&B Album of the Year)

===== Urban Music Album of the Year =====
- 2007 : Gibraltar by Abd Al Malik
- 2008 : Chapitre 7 by MC Solaar
- 2009 : Dante by Abd Al Malik
- 2010 : L'arme de paix by Oxmo Puccino
- 2011 : Château Rouge by Abd Al Malik
- 2012 : Le Chant des sirènes by Orelsan
- 2013 : Roi sans carrosse by Oxmo Puccino
- 2014 : Paris Sud Minute by 1995
- 2015 : Je suis en vie by Akhenaton
- 2016 : Feu by Nekfeu
- 2017 : My World by Jul
- 2018 : La fête est finie by Orelsan (second award)
- 2019 : La vie de rêve by Bigflo & Oli

==== Reggae/Ragga (various) ====
- 2002 : The Real Don by Lord Kossity (as Reggae/Ragga Album of the Year)
- 2003 : Umani by I Muvrini and Francafrique by Tiken Jah Fakoly (as Reggae/Ragga/World Music Album of the Year)
- 2004 : Voz d'amor de Cesária Évora (as Reggae/Ragga/World Music Album of the Year)
- 2005 : Dimanche à Bamako by Amadou et Mariam (as Reggae/Ragga/World Music Album of the Year)

==== Electronic/Groove/Dance Album of the Year ====
- 1998 : 30 by Laurent Garnier
- 1999 : Moon Safari by Air
- 2000 : Trabendo by Les Négresses Vertes
- 2001 : Tourist by Saint-Germain
- 2002 : Modjo by Modjo
- 2003 : La Revancha del Tango by Gotan Project
- 2004 : Émilie Simon by Émilie Simon
- 2005 : Talkie Walkie by Air
- 2006 : Animal sophistiqué by Bumcello
- 2007 : Végétal by Émilie Simon
- 2008 : † by Justice
- 2010 : Manual For Successful Rioting by Birdy Nam Nam
- 2011 : Cheese by Stromae
- 2012 : Audio, Video, Disco by Justice
- 2013 : Tetra by C2C
- 2014 : OutRun by Kavinsky
- 2015 : Ghost Surfer by Cascadeur
- 2016 : The Wanderings of the Avener by The Avener
- 2017 : Layers by Kungs
- 2018 : Temperance by Dominique Dalcan
- 2019 : Dancehall by The Blaze

==== Variety/Instrumental Album of the Year ====
- 1985 : Zoolook by Jean Michel Jarre
- 1986 : Rendez-vous by Jean Michel Jarre (second award)
- 1992 : Explorer by Jean-Jacques Milteau
- 1993 : Négropolitaines Vol. 2 by Manu Dibango
- 1994 : Cross over USA by Claude Bolling
- 1995 : Jonasz en noires et blanches by Jean-Yves D'Angelo
- 1996 : Les Parapluies de Cherbourg, Summer of '42 (Un été 42), Yentl and The Go-Between (Le Messager) by Michel Legrand

==== Album of the Year for Children ====
- 1985 : Les Petits Ewoks by Dorothée
- 1987 : Histoires pour les 4/5 ans by Jean Rochefort

Discontinued 1988 to 1990

- 1991 : La Petite Sirène told by Nathalie Baye
- 1992 : Pierre et le Loup de Prokofiev by Julien Clerc
- 1993 : Pierre et le Loup de Prokofiev recited by Lambert Wilson
- 1994 : Aladin et la Lampe merveilleuse recited by Sabine Azéma
- 1995 : L'Évasion de Toni by Henri Dès and Pierre Grosz
- 1997 : Far West by Henri Dès (second award)
- 1999 : Émilie Jolie (2nd version) by Philippe Chatel
- 2001 : Du soleil by Henri Dès (third award)

==== Original Cinema/Television Soundtrack of the Year ====
- 1985 : Subway - Éric Serra
- 1986 : 37°2 le Matin - Gabriel Yared
- 1987 : Manon des Sources - Jean-Claude Petit
- 1988 : Le Grand Bleu - Éric Serra
- 1990 : Camille Claudel - Gabriel Yared
- 1991 : Cyrano de Bergerac - Jean-Claude Petit
- 1992 : Delicatessen - Carlos D'Alession
- 1993 : L'Amant - Gabriel Yared
- 1994 : L'Ecrivain public - William Sheller
- 1995 : Léon - Éric Serra
- 1996 : Un indien dans la ville - K.O.D. (Manu Katché, Geoffrey Oryema and Tonton David)
- 1997 : Microcosmos, le Peuple de l'Herbe - Bruno Coulais
- 1998 : Le Patient Anglais - Gabriel Yared
- 1999 : Taxi - Akhénaton / Khéops
- 2000 : Ma Petite Entreprise - Alain Bashung
- 2001 : The Virgin Suicides - Air
- 2002 : Le Fabuleux Destin d'Amélie Poulain - Yann Tiersen
- 2004 : Good Bye Lenin! - Yann Tiersen
- 2005 : Les Choristes - Bruno Coulais / Christophe Barratier / Philippe Lopes Curval
- 2006 : March of the Penguins - Émilie Simon
- 2007 : Ne le dis à personne - -M-
- 2008 : Arthur et les Minimoys - Éric Serra

=== Song of the Year ===
- 1985 : "La Boîte de Jazz" (writer/composer/performer: Michel Jonasz)
- 1986 : "Belle-île en mer" (composer/performer: Laurent Voulzy - lyricist: Alain Souchon)
- 1987 : "Musulmanes" (author/performer: Michel Sardou - lyrics: Jacques Revaux and Jean-Pierre Bourtayre)
- 1988 : "Né quelque part" (lyrics/performer: Maxime Le Forestier - composer: Jean-Pierre Sabar)
- 1990 : "Quand j'serai KO" (lyrics/composer/performer: Alain Souchon)
- 1991 : "Fais-moi une place" (composer/performer: Julien Clerc - lyrics: Françoise Hardy)
- 1992 : "Un homme heureux" (lyrics/composer/performer: William Sheller)
- 1993 : "Le Chat" by Pow woW
- 1994 : "Foule sentimentale" (lyrics/composer/performer: Alain Souchon)
- 1995 : "Juste quelqu'un de bien" by Enzo Enzo (lyrics/composer/: Kent Cockenstock - arranger : François Bréant)
- 1996 : "Pour que tu m'aimes encore" by Céline Dion (lyrics/composer: Jean-Jacques Goldman - arrangers: Jean-Jacques Goldman et Erick Benzi)
- 1997 : "Aïcha" by Khaled (lyrics, composer: Jean-Jacques Goldman)
- 1998 : "L'Homme pressé" by Noir Désir (lyrics/composer: Bertrand Cantat / Noir Désir - arranger : Andy Baker)
- 1999 : "Belle" from Notre Dame de Paris (sung by Garou, Daniel Lavoie and Patrick Fiori - lyrics: Luc Plamondon - composer: Richard Cocciante)
- 2000 : "Tomber la chemise" by Zebda (lyrics: Magyd Cherfi - composer: Zebda)

==== Original Song of the Year ====
- 2001 : "L'envie d'aimer" by Daniel Lévi (lyrics: Lionel Florence and Patrice Guirao - composer: Pascal Obispo - arranger: Nick Ingman)
- 2002 : "Sous le vent" by Garou and Céline Dion (lyrics/composer: Jacques Veneruso - arrangers : Christophe Battaglia and Jacques Veneruso)
- 2003 : "Manhattan-Kaboul" by Renaud and Axelle Red (lyrics: Renaud - composer/arranger: Jean-Pierre Bucolo)
- 2004 : "Respire" by Mickey 3D (lyrics: Mickaël Furnon - composers: Najah El Mahmoud / Mickaël Furnon / Aurélien Joanin)
- 2005 : "Si seulement je pouvais lui manquer" by Calogero (lyrics: Michel Jourdan / Julie Daime, composers: Calogero/Gioacchino Maurici)
- 2006 : "Caravane" by Raphaël (lyrics/composer: Raphael)
- 2007 : "Le dîner" by Bénabar (lyrics/composer: Bénabar)
- 2008 : "Double je" by Christophe Willem (lyrics: Zazie, composers: Zazie / Jean-Pierre Pilot / Olivier Schultheis)
- 2009 : "Comme un manouche sans guitare" by Thomas Dutronc (lyrics: Thomas Dutronc, composer: Thomas Dutronc)
- 2010 : "Comme des enfants" by Cœur de pirate (lyrics: Cœur de pirate, composer: Cœur de pirate)
- 2011 : "Je veux" by Zaz (lyrics: Kerredine Soltani, composers: Kerredine Soltani / Tryss)
- 2012 : "Jeanne" by Laurent Voulzy (lyrics: Alain Souchon - composer: Laurent Voulzy)
- 2013 : "Allez allez allez" by Camille (lyrics/composer: Camille)
- 2014 : "20 ans" by Johnny Hallyday (lyrics: Christophe Miossec - composer: David Ford)
- 2015 : "Un jour au mauvais endroit" by Calogero (lyrics:Marie Bastide - composer: Calogero)
- 2016 : "Sapés comme jamais" by Maître Gims (lyrics/composers: Maître Gims, Niska, Dany Synthé)
- 2017 : "Je m'en vais" by Vianney (lyrics/composer Vianney)
- 2018 : "Dommage" by Bigflo & Oli (lyrics: Bigflo & Oli, Paul Van Haver - composers: Bigflo & Oli, Stromae)
- 2019 : "Je me dis que toi aussi" by Boulevard des airs

=== Musical Show and Concert of the Year ===
==== Musical Show ====
- 1985 : Julien Clerc at Bercy
- 1986 : Jean Michel Jarre in Houston
- 1987 : Cabaret directed by Jérôme Savary at the Théâtre Mogador
- 1988 : La Fabuleuse Histoire de Mister Swing by Michel Jonasz
- 1992 : Les Misérables by Alain Boublil et Claude-Michel Schönberg in the Théâtre Mogador
- 1993 : Cérémonie d'ouverture et de clôture des Jeux Olympiques d'hiver à Albertville (choreography : Philippe Decouflé)
- 1994 : Starmania at the Théâtre Mogador
- 1996 : Les Poubelle Boys at the Paris Olympia

==== Concert of the Year ====
- 1990 : Francis Cabrel at the Zénith
- 1991 : Johnny Hallyday in Bercy
- 1992 : Eddy Mitchell at the Casino de Paris
- 1993 : Jacques Dutronc in the Casino de Paris
- 1994 : Johnny Hallyday at the Parc des Princes
- 1995 : Eddy Mitchell in Bercy, at the Casino de Paris, at the Paris Olympia and at the Zénith
- 1996 : Johnny Hallyday in Bercy
- 1998 : Sol En Si in Casino de Paris

=== Musical Show, Tour or Concert of the Year ===
- 1999 : Notre Dame de Paris at the Casino de Paris
- 2000 : Je dis aime by -M- at l'Elysée Montmartre and on tour
- 2001 : Johnny Hallyday at the Eiffel Tower, at the Paris Olympia and on tour
- 2002 : Henri Salvador at the Paris Olympia
- 2003 : Christophe at the Paris Olympia
- 2004 : Fan en tournée by Pascal Obispo
- 2005 : -M- at the Olympia and on tour
- 2006 : Zazie Rodéo tour at Bercy and on tour
- 2007 : Olivia Ruiz
- 2008 : Michel Polnareff - Ze Tour 2007
- 2009 : Alain Bashung - Bleu pétrole tour
- 2010 : Johnny Hallyday - Tour 66
- 2013 : Shaka Ponk at the Olympia, Le Zénith and Bataclan - The Geeks Tour (Production: Zouave Spectacles)
- 2014 : -M- - Îl(s)
- 2015 : Stromae - Racine carrée Tour
- 2016 : Christine and the Queens - Zéniths Tour
- 2017 : Ibrahim Maalouf - Red and Black Light
- 2018 : Camille - Tour
- 2019 : Orelsan - Tour

=== Music Video of the Year ===
- 1985 : "Pull Marine" by Isabelle Adjani (Director: Luc Besson)
- 1986 : "La Ballade de Jim" by Alain Souchon (Director: Philippe Bensoussan)
- 1987 : "C'est comme ça " by Rita Mitsouko (Director: Jean-Baptiste Mondino)
- 1988 : "Là-bas" by Jean-Jacques Goldman (Director: Bernard Schmitt)
- 1990 : "Casser la voix" by Patrick Bruel (Directors: Joëlle Bouvier and Régis Obadia)
- 1991 : "Tandem" by Vanessa Paradis (Director: Jean-Baptiste Mondino)
- 1992 : "Auteuil, Neuilly, Passy" by Les Inconnus (Directors: Gérard Pullicino and les Inconnus)
- 1993 : "Osez Joséphine" by Alain Bashung (Director: Jean-Baptiste Mondino)
- 1994 : "L'Ennemi dans la glace" by Alain Chamfort (Director: Jean-Baptiste Mondino)
- 1995 : "Nouveau Western" by MC Solaar (Director: Stéphane Sednaoui)
- 1996 : "Larsen" by Zazie (Director: Philippe Andre)
- 1997 : "C'est ça la France" by Marc Lavoine (Director: Sylvain Bergère)
- 1998 : "Savoir aimer" by Florent Pagny (Director: Sylvain Bergère)
- 1999 : "La nuit je mens " by Alain Bashung (Director: Jacques Audiard)
- 2000 : "Flat Beat" by Mr. Oizo (Director: Quentin Dupieux)
- 2001 : "Am I Wrong by Étienne de Crécy (Director: Geoffrey de Crécy)
- 2002 : "Le vent nous portera" by Noir Désir (Director: Alexandre Courtes and Jacques Veneruso)
- 2003 : "Tournent les violons" by Jean-Jacques Goldman (Director: Yannick Saillet)
- 2004 : "Respire" by Mickey 3D
- 2005 : "Les beaux yeux de Laure" by Alain Chamfort (Director: Bruno Decharme)
- 2006 : "Est-ce que tu aimes ?" by Arthur H and -M-
- 2007 : "Marly-Gomont" by Kamini
- 2008 : "1234" by Feist
- 2009 : "Les limites" by Julien Doré (Directors: Fabrice Laffont et Julien Doré)
- 2010 : "Elle panique" by Olivia Ruiz (Director: Valérie Pierson)
- 2011 : "La Banane" by Philippe Katerine (Director: Gaëtan Chataigner)
- 2012 : "La Seine" by Vanessa Paradis and -M- (Director: Bibo Bergeron)
- 2013 : "FUYA" by C2C (Directors: Sylvain Richard and Francis Cutter)
- 2014 : "Formidable" by Stromae (Director: Jérôme Guillot)
- 2015 : "Saint Claude" by Christine and the Queens (Director: J.A.C.K.)
- 2016 : "Christine" by Christine and the Queens (Director: J.A.C.K.) (second award)
- 2017 : "Makeba" by Jain
- 2018 : "Basique" by Orelsan
- 2019 : "Tout oublier' by Angèle (Directors: Brice VDH and Léo Walk)

=== Music DVD of the Year ===
- 2005 : Les leçons de musique by -M- (director: Emilie Chedid)
- 2006 : En images by Noir Désir (director: Don Kent)
- 2007 : Tryo fête ses dix ans by Tryo
- 2008 : Le Soldat Rose by Louis Chedid (director: Jean-Louis Cap)
- 2009 : Divinidylle by Vanessa Paradis (directors: Thierry Poiraud - Didier Poiraud)
- 2010 : Alain Bashung à l'Olympia by Alain Bashung (director: Fabien Raymond)
- 2014 : Geeks on Stage by Shaka Ponk

=== Various awards ===
Sound engineer

- 1985 : Andy Scott for Julien Clerc at Bercy
- 1992 : Dominique Blanc-Francard for Seul dans ton coin of David McNeil and Amours secrètes... Passion publique of Julien Clerc
- 1993 : Patrice Cramer for Où est la source? of Michel Jonasz

Album producer

- 1985 : Michel Jonasz, Kamil Rustam, Gabriel Yared, Manu Katché, Jean-Yves D'Angelo and Georges Rodi - for Unis vers l'uni of Michel Jonasz

Studio musician

- 1986 : Jannick Top
- 1987 : Manu Katché
- 1988 : Russell Powell

Producer / Arranger

- 1992 : Mick Lanaro for Si ce soir... of Patrick Bruel and Sheller en solitaire of William Sheller
- 1993 : Michel Cœuriot and Laurent Voulzy for Caché derrière of Laurent Voulzy
- 1994 : Dominique Blanc-Francard

Show producer

- 1992 : Jean-Claude Camus
- 1993 : Gilbert Coullier
- 1994 : L'Olympia
- 1995 : Corida
- 1996 : Jules Frutos, Hélène Rol et Dominique Revert

Record covers

- 1985 : William Klein for cover of Love on the Beat by Serge Gainsbourg
- 1986 : Ennio Antonangeli, Silvana Fantino and Jeanne Mas for Femmes d'aujourd'hui by Jeanne Mas

=== Comedian of the Year ===
- 1985 : Raymond Devos
- 1987 : Coluche
- 1990 : Les Inconnus
- 1991 : Les Inconnus (second award)
- 1992 : Smaïn
- 1993 : Guy Bedos and Muriel Robin
- 1994 : Patrick Timsit
- 1995 : Raymond Devos (second award)
- 1996 : Les Inconnus (third award)
- 1997 : Valérie Lemercier
- 1998 : Quator for the show Il pleut des cordes (as Humour show of the year)

=== Honorary Award ===
- 1990 : Serge Gainsbourg
- 1996 : Henri Salvador
- 2001 : Renaud
- 2003 : Serge Reggiani
- 2007 : Juliette Gréco and Michel Polnareff
- 2009 : Johnny Hallyday and Jean-Loup Dabadie
- 2010 : Charles Aznavour, Stevie Wonder and Hugues Aufray
- 2011 : Indochine
- 2013 : Véronique Sanson and Sheila

== Multiple awards ==
- 13 won
  - Matthieu Chedid, (Note: Les Victoires de Matthieu Chedid (avec sources systématiques)) Alain Bashung
- 12 won
  - Orelsan
- 10 won
  - Johnny Hallyday, Alain Souchon
- 7 won
  - Vanessa Paradis
- 6 won
  - Jean-Jacques Goldman, Patricia Kaas, Renaud, Zazie
- 5 won
  - Camille, Julien Clerc, Michel Jonasz, Eddy Mitchell, Noir Désir, MC Solaar, Stromae, Laurent Voulzy, Michel Sardou
- 4 won
  - Abd al Malik, Benjamin Biolay, C2C, Francis Cabrel, Christine and the Queens, Les Inconnus, Louise attaque, Jean-Baptiste Mondino, Olivia Ruiz, Henri Salvador, Éric Serra, William Sheller, Julien Doré
- 3 won
  - Air, Angèle, Bénabar, Bigflo et Oli, Calogero, Patrick Bruel, Henri Dès, Céline Dion, Mylène Farmer, Serge Gainsbourg, Arthur H, Les Innocents, Izïa, Jean-Michel Jarre, Manu Katché, Kyo, Daniel Lavoie, Jeanne Mas, Mickey 3D, Yael Naim, Raphael, Gaëtan Roussel, Véronique Sanson, Shaka Ponk, Émilie Simon, Rachid Taha
