= Jam Sessions =

2007 video game

- European cover art
- Developer: Plato
- Publishers: Plato (Japan); Ubisoft (International)
- Directors: Seth Delackner; Seiichi Okumiya
- Platform: Nintendo DS
- Release: JP: February 1, 2007; NA: September 11, 2007; AU: September 27, 2007; EU: September 28, 2007
- Genre: Music
- Mode: Single player

Jam Sessions is a guitar simulation software title and music game for the Nintendo DS that was originally based on the Japan-only title Sing & Play DS Guitar M-06 (Hiite Utaeru DS Guitar M-06) originally developed by Plato and released months earlier. It was later brought to North America, Europe, Australia and New Zealand, courtesy of Ubisoft.

== Overview ==
Jam Sessions makes use of the DS touch screen to simulate strumming on a real guitar, while the D-pad is used for selecting chords. The game allows players to play through a list of songs in order to unlock other features such as upgraded strings and new backgrounds, while Free Play allows the player to simply strum away, playing out songs or practicing without being judged. Tutorial and Warm Up modes teach players how to play the game and get accustomed to the controls and the concepts behind playing guitar.

What makes Jam Sessions different from other rhythm games, such as Guitar Hero, is that it is considered to be a tool instead of a game. In addition, the player (while using headphones or an external speaker) can also use the DS microphone to sing along. Andy Myers of Nintendo Power and his band, Hidari Mae demonstrated this ability by writing and recording a song using Jam Sessions for guitar alongside traditional instruments.

The DS can also be plugged into an amplifier via the headphone jack to output a more natural sound. A Jam Sessions "Performance Bundle" was set to be released on January 4, 2008 and was going to include a portable amplifier in addition to the game. The bundle has since disappeared from Ubisoft's web page.

== Differences from Sing & Play DS Guitar M-06 ==
In addition to publishing and translating the game for western players, Ubisoft have also modified and expanded certain aspects of the original title. These include:

- Additional Tutorial and Warm Up modes.
- The ability to apply effects such as distortion, flanger and tremolo.
- The ability to record and save up to five original compositions.
- Expanded selection of aesthetic themes.
- Distinct audio output settings optimised for DS speakers, headphones and external speakers.
- A new list of English-language songs (see below).

== Songs ==
The chords and lyrics to the following list of songs appear in the game for players to perform. Some songs also feature an audio demo of the song.

=== Songs with demos ===
- Beck - "Jack-Ass"
- Bob Dylan - "Like a Rolling Stone"
- Bob Marley - "No Woman, No Cry"
- Coldplay - "Yellow"
- Death Cab for Cutie - "I Will Follow You into the Dark"
- The Fray - "Over My Head (Cable Car)"
- Nirvana - "The Man Who Sold the World"
- Avril Lavigne - "I'm with You"
- Rascal Flatts - "Life Is a Highway"
- Blind Melon - "No Rain"

=== Chords and lyrics only ===
- James Taylor - "How Sweet It Is to Be Loved by You"
- Johnny Cash - "I Forgot More Than You'll Ever Know"
- Janis Joplin - "Me and Bobby McGee"
- The Jackson 5 - "Never Can Say Goodbye"
- Cheap Trick - "Surrender"
- Marvin Gaye - "What's Going On"
- Amy Winehouse - "You Know I'm No Good"

The following songs are available on the European version:

- Jimi Hendrix - "Wild Thing"
- Tom Petty - "Needles and Pins"
- The Pigeon Detectives - "I'm Not Sorry"
- Indochine - "J'ai Demande A La Lune"
- Les Negresses Vertes - "Voila L'ete"
- Louise Attaque - "J't'emmene Au Vent"
- Mickey 3D - "Respire"
- Pierpoljak - "Je Sais Pas Jouer"
- Nacha Pop - "Chica De Ayer"
- Mecano - "Hoy No Me Puedo Levantar"
- Loquillo - "Cadillac Solitario"
- Los Ronaldos - "Adios Papa"
- Alaska y Dinarama - "¿A Quién Le Importa?"
- Battiato - "Centro Di Gravita Permanente"
- Pino Daniele - "Je So Pazzo"
- Eros Ramazzotti - "Piu Bella Cosa"
- Giorgia - "Come Saprei"
- Litfiba - "Il Mio Corpo Che Cambia"
- Juli - "Perfekte Welle"
- Nena - "Irgendwie, irgendwo, irgendwann"
- Juli - "Geile Zeit"
- Guano Apes - "Open Your Eyes"

Copies of Jam Sessions sold at Best Buy also include the chords and lyrics of the following songs available by default:

- Brad Paisley - "I'm Gonna Miss Her (The Fishin' Song)"
- Tom Petty - "Needles and Pins"
- Jimi Hendrix - "Wild Thing"

These Best Buy "exclusive" songs can be unlocked in other copies by inputting a variation of the Konami Code.

In the Europe version, the following songs can be unlocked by pressing up, up, down, down, left, right, left, right in free play mode. If playing in left-handed mode the code is X, X, B, B, Y, A, Y, A.

- James Taylor - "How Sweet It Is to Be Loved by You"
- Cheap Trick - "Surrender"
- Brad Paisley - "I'm Gonna Miss Her (The Fishin' Song)"

== Promotion ==
The game is infamous for its Australia & New Zealand ad campaign, which consisted of two viral internet advertisements that had content at odds with the otherwise G-rated game. The first features a child named Hudson swearing at his mother over being given sponge cake, while the other showed another boy named Jacob making out with his aunt against her will after receiving Jam Sessions for his birthday.

== See also ==
- Guitar Hero: On Tour
- Jam Sessions 2
