= Vegetal =

Vegetal, the adjectival form of vegetable, can be

- Vegetal (wine), a descriptive term used in wine tasting
- Végétal, the second studio album by singer-songwriter Émilie Simon
- the vegetal pole in biology, see Polarity in embryogenesis

See also

- Vegetale, a 1997 album by the French band Ulan Bator
