= Respiration =

Respiration may refer to:

== Biology ==
- Cellular respiration, the process in which nutrients are converted into useful energy in a cell
  - Anaerobic respiration, cellular respiration without oxygen
  - Maintenance respiration, the amount of cellular respiration required for an organism to maintain itself in a constant state
- Respiration (physiology), transporting oxygen and carbon dioxide between cells and the external environment
  - Respiratory system, the anatomical system of an organism used for respiration
  - Breathing, passing air in and out through respiratory organs
  - Aquatic respiration, animals extracting oxygen from water
  - Artificial respiration, the act of simulating respiration, which provides for the overall exchange of gases in the body by pulmonary ventilation, external respiration and internal respiration
  - Cheyne–Stokes respiration, an abnormal pattern of breathing characterized by progressively deeper and sometimes faster breathing, followed by a gradual decrease that results in a temporary stop in breathing called an apnea
- Respiration, a journal by Karger Publishers

== Ecology ==
- Carbon respiration, a concept used in calculating carbon (as CO_{2}) flux occurring in the atmosphere
- Ecosystem respiration, measurement of gross carbon dioxide production by all organisms in an ecosystem
- Root respiration, exchange of gases between plant roots and the atmosphere
- Photorespiration, enzymatic combination of RuBP with oxygen

== Entertainment ==
- "Respiration" (song), a 1999 single by Black Star
- "Respire" (song), a 2003 song by Mickey 3D
- Respire (film), a 2014 French drama film
- Respiration (album), a 2022 album by Cecil Taylor

== See also ==
- Aspiration (disambiguation)
