= Émilie Simon à L'Olympia =

L’Olympia

Live album by Émilie Simon
- Released: February 26, 2007
- Recorded: September 19, 2006
- Genre: Electronic
- Label: Universal

Émilie Simon chronology
The Flower Book (2006)	L’Olympia (2007)	The Big Machine (2009)

À L’Olympia is a live album, and DVD, by French electronic musician Émilie Simon, released in February 2007. It includes songs from all of her albums. The album contains material taken from a concert in September 2006 at the Olympia. The DVD contains footage of the making of the album, a video produced by her in Japan for “Dame de lotus”, and all her three music videos to date.

== Track listing ==
=== CD ===
1. Dame De Lotus
2. Fleur De Saison
3. Rose Hybride De Thé
4. In The Lake
5. Sweet Blossom
6. Swimming
7. Opium
8. Le Vieil Amant
9. Ice Girl
10. I Wanna Be Your Dog
11. Song Of The Storm
12. Never Fall In Love
13. Désert
14. Alicia
15. En Cendres
16. My Old Friend
17. Graines D’Étoiles
18. Flowers
19. Come As You Are

=== Opendisc tracks ===
1. Annie
2. All Is White

=== DVD ===
1. [intro]
2. Dame de lotus
3. Fleur de saison
4. Rose hybride de thé
5. In the lake
6. Sweet blossom
7. Annie
8. Swimming
9. Opium
10. Le vieil amant
11. Ice girl
12. All is white
13. I wanna be your dog
14. Never fall in love
15. Désert
16. Alicia
17. En cendres
18. Graines d’étoiles
19. My old friend
20. Flowers
21. Come as you are

== Charts ==
=== Album ===
Chart (2007)	Peak Position
French Album Charts	117
