= Root hair =

Part of plant root

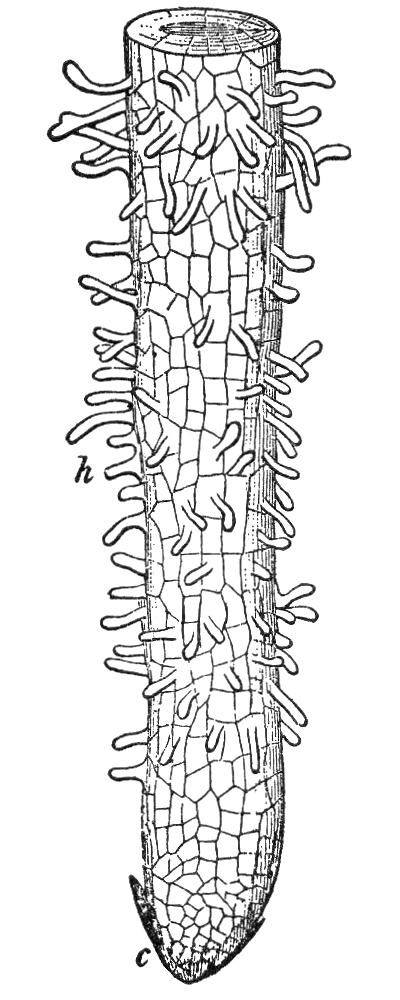
Root tip, showing young root hairs

Root hairs or absorbent hairs, are outgrowths of epidermal cells, specialized cells at the tip of a plant root. They are lateral extensions of a single cell and are only rarely branched. They are found in the region of maturation, of the root. Root hair cells improve plant water absorption by increasing root surface area to volume ratio which allows the root hair cell to take in more water. The large vacuole inside root hair cells makes this intake much more efficient. Root hairs are also important for nutrient uptake as they are main interface between plants and mycorrhizal fungi.

== Function ==
The function of all root hairs is to collect water and mineral nutrients in the soil to be sent throughout the plant. In roots, most water absorption happens through the root hairs. The length of root hairs allows them to penetrate between soil particles and prevents harmful bacterial organisms from entering the plant through the xylem vessels. Increasing the surface area of these hairs makes plants more efficient in absorbing nutrients and interacting with microbes. As root hair cells do not carry out photosynthesis, they do not contain chloroplasts.

== Importance ==
Root hairs form an important surface as they are needed to absorb most of the water and nutrients needed for the plant. They are also directly involved in the formation of root nodules in legume plants. The root hairs curl around the bacteria, which allows for the formation of an infection thread into the dividing cortical cells to form the nodule.

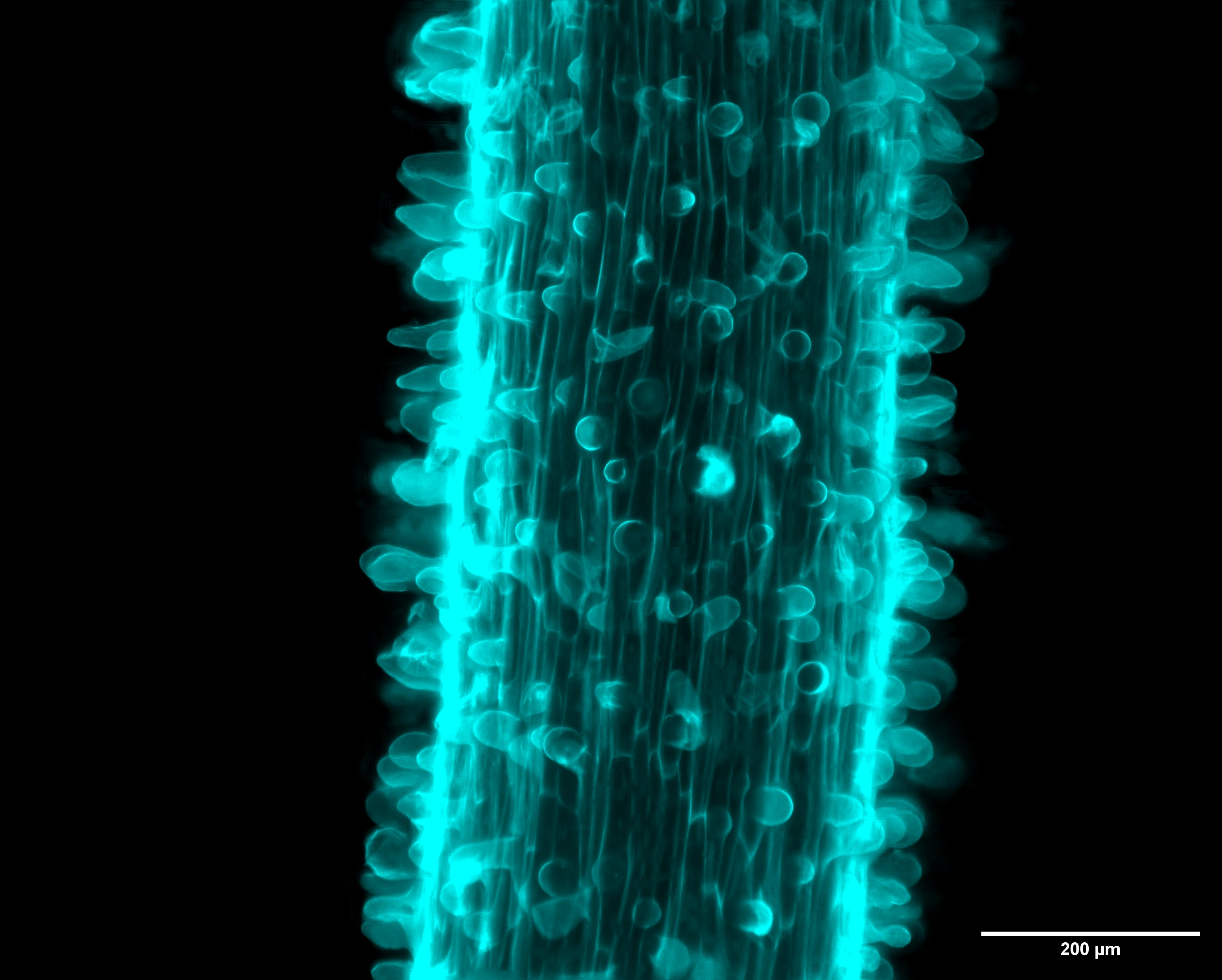
Calcofluor White confocal fluorescent image of developing tomato root

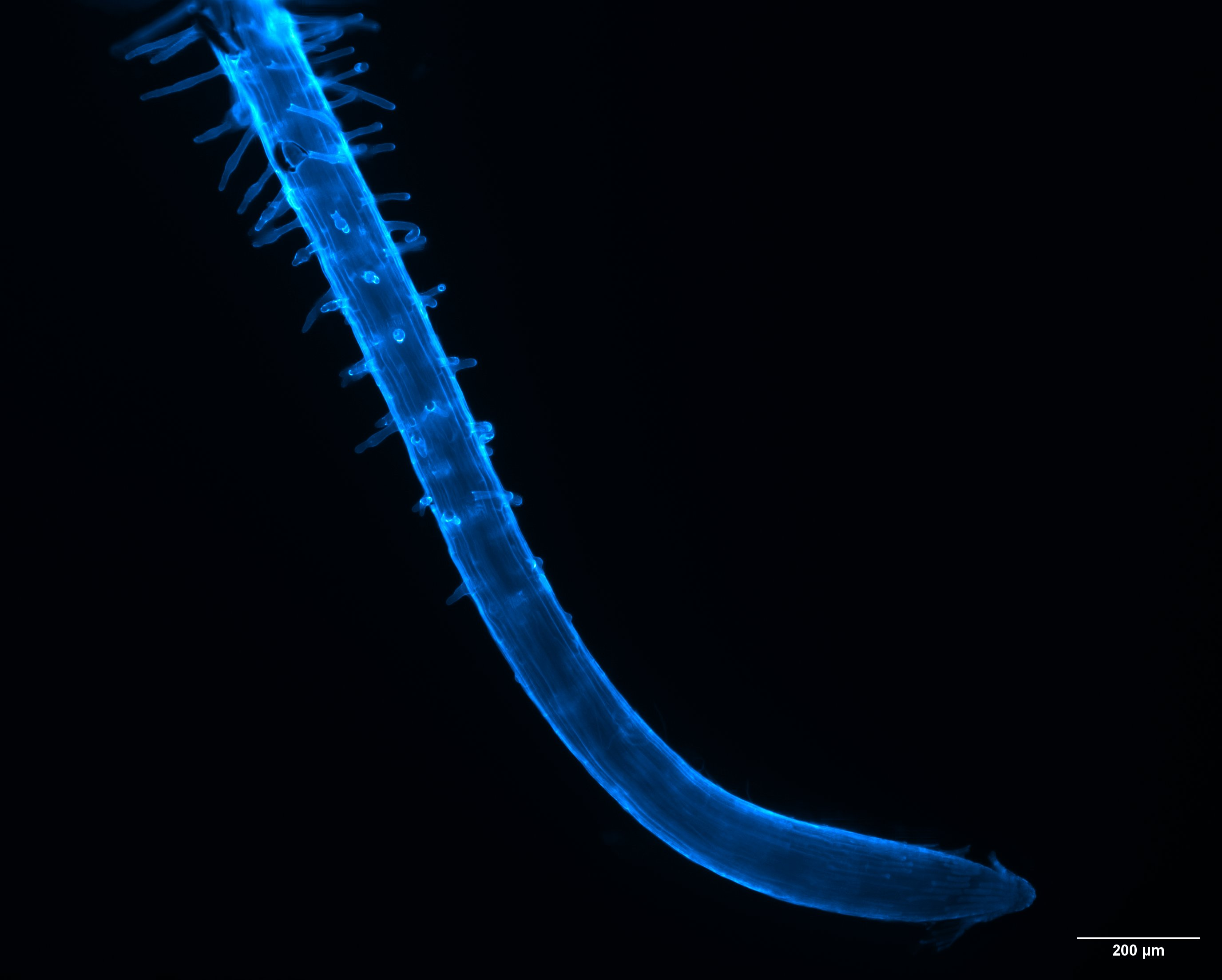
Confocal fluorescence image of Arabidopsis root hairs

Having a large surface area, the active uptake of water and minerals through root hairs is highly efficient. Root hair cells also secrete acids (e.g., malic and citric acid), which solubilize minerals by changing their oxidation state, making the ions easier to absorb.

== Formation ==
Root hair cells vary between 15 and 17 micrometers in diameter, and 80 and 1,500 micrometers in length. Root hairs are found only in the zone of maturation, also called the zone of differentiation. They are not found in the zone of elongation, possibly because older root hairs are sheared off as the root elongates and moves through the soil. Root hairs grow quickly, at least 1 μm/min, making them particularly useful for research on cell expansion. Just prior to and during root hair cell development, there is elevated phosphorylase activity.

== Fungal interaction ==
Root hairs are essential for healthy plant nutrition, especially through their interactions with symbiotic fungi. Symbiotic fungi and root hairs produce mycorrhizal symbioses like arbuscular mycorrhiza, formed by AM fungi, and ectomycorrhiza, formed by EM fungi. These are very common, occurring in 90% of terrestrial plant species, because of the benefits it brings to both the fungus and plant.

Formation of this relationship for EM fungi begins with the colonization of the root hairs. This process begins when the EM fungus adheres to the root hair from the soil. The fungus then secretes diffusible factors, to which root hairs are highly sensitive, allowing the hyphae to penetrate into the epidermal cells and create a Hartig net in the first layers of the root cortex. This highly branched structure serves as an interface between the two organisms as fungal cells adapt to the exchanges that occur between the plant and fungus. This process is similar to how AM fungi colonize root hairs, but instead of diffusible factors, they secrete hydrolases to relax the cell wall, which allows hyphae to enter, and there is no Hartig net.

Various effects of fungal colonization in root hairs show that this relationship is beneficial to both plant and fungal species, but the main effect is on root hair growth. Fungi actually affect the growth of root hairs if there is water or nutrient deficiency. Since both of these organisms require nutrients and water, their cooperation is essential to their mutual survival. Upon detection of deficiency, the drought stress response of the plant is triggered, causing growth of the root hairs. The mycorrhizae of the fungus then uses its extended system to help the plant find the correct area of nutrition, signaling the direction in which the roots should grow. This makes root growth more efficient, preserving energy for other metabolic processes, which in turn benefits the fungus that feeds off those metabolic products.

== Survival ==
When a new root hair cell grows, it excretes a hormone that inhibits the growth of root hairs in nearby cells. This ensures equal and efficient distribution of the actual hairs on these cells.

Repotting or transplanting a plant can result in root hair cells being pulled off, perhaps to a significant extent, which can cause wilting.

== See also ==
- Trichome
