= Menelek =

Menelek or Menelik may refer to:

- Menelik I, first Emperor of Ethiopia
- Menelik II (1844–1913), Emperor of Ethiopia
- Menelek XIV, fictional Emperor of Abyssinia in the novel Beyond Thirty by Edgar Rice Burroughs
- Ménélik (born 1970), French singer
- Menelik Watson (born 1988), British player of American football
