= Le Jour et la Nuit =

Le Jour et la Nuit (French for 'Day and Night') may refer to:

- Le Jour et la Nuit (opera), an 1881 opéra-bouffe by Charles Lecocq
- "Le Jour et la Nuit", a track on the 2018 album Trafic by Gaëtan Roussel
- Day and Night (1997 film) (French: Le Jour et la Nuit), a film by Bernard-Henri Lévy
