= Aspire =

Aspire may refer to:

== Architecture ==
- Aspire Parramatta, a shelved skyscraper in Parramatta, Sydney, now called 6 & 8 Parramatta Square
- Aspire Zone, also known as Doha Sports City, a sporting complex Al Rayyan, Doha, Qatar
  - Aspire Academy, a sports academy based in the Aspire Zone
  - Aspire Dome, an indoor multi-purpose arena in the Aspire Zone
  - Aspire Tower, also known as The Torch Doha, a skyscraper hotel in the Aspire Zone

== Arts, entertainment, and media ==
- Aspire (sculpture), a 60 metre sculpture at the University of Nottingham, England
- Aspire TV (American TV network), a United States television network
- Aspire TV (Australian TV channel), an Australian television network
- "Aspire", a song by Northlane from their album Singularity

== Automobiles ==
- Ford Aspire, a name plate
  - Ford Festiva, sold in North America as the Ford Aspire
  - Ford Figo, a sedan variant called Ford Figo Aspire in India
- Honda City, a Japanese subcompact sedan, sold in Pakistan as Honda City Aspire
- Mitsubishi Aspire, a Japanese mid-size sports sedan

== Other uses ==
- Aspire (political party), a local political party in the London Borough of Tower Hamlets
- Acer Aspire, a series of computers
- USS Aspire, transferred to the Soviet Union as Soviet minesweeper T-119
- Aspire (Energy), an energy drink

== See also ==
- Aspiration (disambiguation)
