= The Flower Book =

The Flower Book may refer to:

- The Flower Book (album), a compilation album by the French singer/songwriter Émilie Simon
- The Flower Book (Edward Burne-Jones), a series of 38 round watercolours, each about 15 cm (6 in) across, painted from 1882 to 1898
