= The Flower Book (album) =

Compilation album by Émilie Simon
- Released: November 7, 2006
- Recorded: 2002–2006
- Genre: Pop, trip hop, techno
- Label: Milan Records

Émilie Simon chronology
Végétal (2006)	The Flower Book (2006)	À L’Olympia (2007)

Alternative cover

Professional ratings
Review scores
Source	Rating
Allmusic	3.5/5 stars

The Flower Book is a compilation album by the French singer/songwriter Émilie Simon. Released only in the US and Canada, this album takes from all her previous works, and adds two new versions of songs, “I Wanna Be Your Dog (Remix)” and “Desert (English Version) ”.

== Track listing ==
1. “Song Of The Storm” from La Marche de l'Empereur
2. “I Wanna Be Your Dog”
3. “Dame De Lotus” from Végétal
4. “Désert” (English version)
5. “Fleur De Saison” from Végétal
6. “Le Vieil Amant” from Végétal
7. “Sweet Blossom” from Végétal
8. “Rose Hybride De Thé” from Végétal
9. “Never Fall In Love” from Végétal
10. “Flowers” from Émilie Simon
11. “Il Pleut” from Émilie Simon
12. “Swimming” from Végétal
13. “In The Lake” from Végétal
14. “My Old Friend” from Végétal
15. “To The Dancers In The Rain” from Émilie Simon
