= Aspiration =

Aspiration or aspirations may refer to:

== Linguistics ==
- Aspirated consonant, a plosive or fricative pronounced with a strong burst of air
- Voiceless glottal fricative, the sound [h]
  - Debuccalization, the conversion of a consonant to [h] or [ʔ]
  - Rough breathing, a symbol used in Ancient Greek to indicate a /h/ sound

== Medicine ==
- Aspiration, suction (medicine) to remove liquid or gas/dust
- Aspiration, the practice of pulling back on the plunger of a syringe prior to injecting medication.
- Aspiration pneumonia, a lung infection caused by pulmonary aspiration
- Aspiration thrombectomy, embolectomy where a thrombus is removed by suction
- Bone marrow aspiration
- Joint aspiration, or arthrocentesis
- Nasogastric aspiration or nasogastric intubation, the removal of the stomach's contents via a nasogastric tube
- Needle aspiration biopsy, a surgical procedure
- Pulmonary aspiration, the entry of secretions or foreign material into the trachea and lungs, includes the inhalation of fluid while drinking
- Vacuum aspiration, a pregnancy termination procedure

== Other uses ==
- Aspiration, removal of a liquid or gas by means of suction
- Aspiration, Inc., a personal finance company
- Aspiration management, an individual's need to meet realistic goals, receive feedback and experience a sense of accomplishment
- "Aspirations", a song by Gentle Giant on their album The Power and the Glory
- Naturally aspirated engine, an internal combustion engine that relies on atmospheric pressure for air intake without a supercharger or turbocharger
- Aspiration (album)

== See also ==
- Aspirating smoke detector, a detector which draws air through pipes
- Aspirator (disambiguation)
- Aspire (disambiguation)
- Respiration (disambiguation)
