= Defiant Order =

Studio album by Birdy Nam Nam
- Released: 19 November 2011 (France); 28 May 2013 (Re-release)
- Recorded: 2010–13
- Genre: Electronic
- Label: Sony (France); Owsla (Worldwide)
- Producer: Birdy Nam Nam

Birdy Nam Nam chronology
| Manual For Successful Rioting (2009) | Defiant Order (2013) |

Singles from Defiant Order
- 1. "Defiant Order" Released: June 15, 2011 (Single) Re-released: January 22, 2013 (EP); 2. "Goin' In" Released: 5 September 2011; 3. "Jaded Future" Released: 16 July 2012

Re-release and title track cover
- Defiant Order EP / Re-release

Defiant Order is the third studio album by French electronic turntable band Birdy Nam Nam. The album was released via Savoir Faire / SME France on 19 September 2011 and was re-released worldwide on 28 May 2013 through Owsla. A four-part series of remix EPs were released weekly starting on 7 June 2013, including tracks from their 2012 mixtape Geto Bird.

== Singles ==
- "Defiant Order" is the album's lead single. It was initially released on 15 June 2011, and was re-released on Owsla alongside four remixes on 22 January 2013. A remix by Phuture Doom was also released on Owsla, exclusively to their subscription service "Nest".
- "Goin' In" is the second single from the album. It was released on 9 May 2011. The song, alongside remixes by Skrillex and French Fries, also features on the "Jaded Future" extended play. The track was remixed several times by Skrillex, who made a "Goin' Hard" mix, a "Goin' Down" mix, two unreleased remixes and a Dog Blood remix with Boys Noize. The A$AP Rocky song "Wild For the Night" on his album LONG.LIVE.A$AP samples Skrillex's "Goin' Down" remix, and both Skrillex and Birdy Nam Nam are credited as featured artists.
- "Jaded Future" is the third single from the album. It was released on 16 July 2012 on Owsla, accompanied by "Goin' In", "Cadillac Dreams" and an assortment of remixes of the three tracks.

== Track listing ==
| No. | Title | Length |
|---|---|---|
| 1. | "Jaded Future" | 3:31 |
| 2. | "Defiant Order" | 3:42 |
| 3. | "Parache" | 3:28 |
| 4. | "Written in the Sand" | 4:34 |
| 5. | "Cadillac Dreams" (featuring Teki Latex) | 4:20 |
| 6. | "Big City Knights" | 4:31 |
| 7. | "Goin' In" | 3:44 |
| 8. | "(The Golden Era) Of El Cobra Discoteca" | 5:55 |
| 9. | "The Plan" (featuring Teki Latex) | 3:53 |
| 10. | "Melancholy at the Sports Bar" | 2:57 |
| 11. | "Black Bird Cloud" | 5:17 |

iTunes bonus track
| No. | Title | Length |
|---|---|---|
| 12. | "Goin' In" (Noob Remix) | 6:06 |

Defiant Order Remixes Project Vol. I: DJ Pone Selects
| No. | Title | Length |
|---|---|---|
| 1. | "Jaded Future" (La Femme Remix) | 4:22 |
| 2. | "Defiant Order" (Breakbot Remix) | 4:14 |
| 3. | "Parache" (Maelstrom Remix) | 4:42 |
| 4. | "Written in the Sand" (G.Vump Remix) | 3:24 |
| 5. | "Cadillac Dreams" (featuring Teki Latex) (DJ Pone Remix) | 2:50 |
| 6. | "The Plan" (featuring Teki Latex) (Bambounou Remix) | 4:59 |
| 7. | "Black Bird Cloud" (DVNO Remix) | 4:01 |

Defiant Order Remixes Project Vol. II: DJ Need Selects
| No. | Title | Length |
|---|---|---|
| 1. | "Defiant Order" (Block Beattaz Remix) | 3:10 |
| 2. | "Defiant Order" (Phuture Doom Remix) | 4:22 |
| 3. | "Written in the Sand" (Mahdyar Aghajani Remix) | 4:41 |
| 4. | "Cadillac Dreams" (featuring Teki Latex) (Culprate Remix) | 4:38 |
| 5. | "Goin' In" (French Fries Remix) | 5:34 |
| 6. | "Goin' In" (Noob Remix) | 6:07 |
| 7. | "Goin' In" (Skrillex 'Goin' Hard' Remix) | 4:00 |
| 8. | "Melancholy at the Sports Bar" (Djedjotronic Remix) | 4:29 |

Defiant Order Remixes Project Vol. III: Crazy B Selects
| No. | Title | Length |
|---|---|---|
| 1. | "Defiant Order" (Craze 'Get Live' Remix) | 5:19 |
| 2. | "Parache" (DJ Sliink Remix) | 4:06 |
| 3. | "Cadillac Dreams" (featuring Teki Latex) (Kaptain Cadillac Remix) | 3:03 |
| 4. | "Cadillac Dreams" (featuring Teki Latex) (Nah Like Remix) | 4:42 |
| 5. | "Goin' In" (Skrillex 'Goin' Down' Remix) | 3:38 |
| 6. | "(The Golden Era) Of El Cobra Discoteca" (Ryan Hemsworth Remix) | 3:56 |
| 7. | "The Plan" (featuring Teki Latex) (Crackboy Remix) | 6:35 |
| 8. | "Melancholy at the Sports Bar" (French Fries Remix) | 4:58 |

Defiant Order Remixes Project Vol. IV: Lil Mike Selects
| No. | Title | Length |
|---|---|---|
| 1. | "Jaded Future" (Foreign Beggars Remix) | 4:38 |
| 2. | "Jaded Future" (Pelican Fly Remix) | 5:07 |
| 3. | "Defiant Order" (ƱZ Remix) | 4:00 |
| 4. | "Cadillac Dreams" (featuring Teki Latex) (Soufien3000 Remix) | 2:47 |
| 5. | "Big City Knights" (Club Cheval Remix) | 4:30 |
| 6. | "The Plan" (featuring Teki Latex) (Jackson 'Lunatic' Remix) | 4:39 |
| 7. | "The Plan" (featuring Teki Latex) (Lil Mike Remix) | 3:05 |

== Personnel ==
Birdy Nam Nam

- Denis "DJ Need" Lebouvier – producer, mixing
- Mickael "Lil Mike" Dalmoro – producer, mixing
- Nicolas "Crazy B" Vadon – producer, mixing
- Thomas "DJ Pone" Parent – producer, mixing

Additional musicians

- Julien "Teki Latex" Pradeyrol – producer, mixing, vocals (5, 7, 9)

== Release history ==
| Region | Date | Format | Label |
|---|---|---|---|
| France | 19 September 2011 | Digital download, CD, vinyl | Sony |
| Worldwide | 28 May 2013 | Digital download | Owsla |
