= Absorption of water =

Life process in plants

In higher plants, water and minerals are absorbed through root hairs, which are in contact with soil water, forming a root hair zone behind the root tips. These root hairs are made of cellulose and pectic substances, which make them highly hydrophilic.

Pleopeltis polypodioides (commonly known as Resurrection Fern) absorbing water through the leaves

== Active absorption ==
Active absorption refers to the absorption of water by roots with the help of adenosine triphosphate, generated by the root respiration: as the root cells actively take part in the process, it is called active absorption. Active absorption takes place in low transpiring and well-watered plants, and 4% of total water absorption is carried out in this process. The active absorption is carried out by two theories; active osmotic water absorption and Active non-osmotic water absorption. In this process, energy is not required.

=== Active osmotic water absorption ===
The root cells behave as an ideal osmotic pressure system through which water moves up from the soil solution to the root xylem along an increasing gradient of D.P.D. (suction pressure, which is the real force for water absorption). If the solute concentration is high and water potential is low in the root cells, water can enter from soil to root cells through endosmosis. Mineral nutrients are absorbed actively by the root cells due to utilisation of adenosine triphosphate (ATP). As a result, the concentration of ions (osmotica) in the xylem vessels is more in comparison to the soil water. A concentration gradient is established between the root and the soil water. The solute potential of xylem water is more in comparison to that of soil and correspondingly water potential is low than the soil water. If stated, water potential is comparatively positive in the soil water. This gradient of water potential causes endosmosis. The endosmosis of water continues until the water potential both in the root and soil becomes equal. It is the absorption of minerals that utilise metabolic energy, but not water absorption. Hence, the absorption of water is indirectly an active process in a plant's life. Active transport is in an opposite direction to that of diffusion.

=== Active non-osmotic water absorption ===
Sometimes water is absorbed against a concentration gradient. This requires the expenditure of metabolic energy released from the respiration of root cells. There is no direct evidence, but some scientists suggest the involvement of energy from respiration. In conclusion, it is said that the evidence supporting active absorption of water are themselves poor.

This mechanism is carried out without utilisation of metabolic energy. Here, only the roots act as an organ of absorption or passage. Hence, sometimes it is called water absorption 'through roots', rather than 'by' roots. It occurs in rapidly transpiring plants during the daytime, because of the opening of stomata and the atmospheric conditions. The force for absorption of water is created at the leaf end i.e. the transpiration pull. The main cause behind this transpiration pull, water is lifted up in the plant axis like a bucket of water is lifted by a person from a well. Transpiration pull is responsible for dragging water at the leaf end, the pull or force is transmitted down to the root through column of water in the xylem elements. The continuity of the water column remains intact due to the cohesion between the molecules and it acts as a rope. Roots simply act as a passive organ of absorption. As transpiration proceeds, water absorption occurs simultaneously to compensate the water loss from the leaf end. Most volume of water entering plants is by means of passive absorption. Passive transport is no different from diffusion, it requires no input of energy: there is free movement of molecules from their higher concentration to their lower concentration. The water will enter the plant via the root cells that can be found in the roots where mainly passive absorption occurs. Also, with the absorption of water, minerals and nutrients are also absorbed.

== See also ==
- Root
- Peter Atkins
- Otto Renner
- Kenneth Thimann
