= Un homme heureux =

Single by William Sheller

from the album Sheller en solitaire
- B-side: "Une chanson qui te ressemblerait"
- Released: June 1991
- Recorded: 19 March 1991; Studio Davout
- Genre: Chanson française
- Length: 3:40
- Label: Philips
- Songwriter(s): William Sheller
- Producer(s): Mick Lanaro, William Sheller

"Un homme heureux" is a song by William Sheller from the album Sheller en solitaire released in 1991. Recorded in Studio Davout in Paris in front of a live audience, like the whole album of which "Un homme heureux" was the only new song, it was performed by Sheller alone on piano and won him the Song of the Year award at the 1992 Victoires de la Musique. The song found success as a single, charting for sixteen weeks on the Top 50 in France. It is Sheller's only title to chart on the Top 50.

== Chart performance ==
Chart	Top position
France (SNEP)	19
