= Louise Attaque (album) =

Studio album by Louise Attaque
- Released: April 22, 1997
- Genre: French rock; folk rock
- Length: 38:50
- Language: French
- Label: Atmosphériques
- Producer: Gordon Gano; Warren Bruleigh

Louise Attaque chronology
Louise Attaque (1997)	Comme on a dit (2000)

Louise Attaque is an album by French rock band Louise Attaque. Released in 1997, this debut album sold 2.5 million copies in France.

== Track listing ==
1. "Amours" – 1:57
2. "J't'emmène au vent" – 3:04
3. "Ton invitation" – 2:39
4. "La brune" – 1:55
5. "Les nuits parisiennes" – 2:31
6. "L'imposture" – 2:23
7. "Savoir" – 1:46
8. "Arrache-moi" – 2:00
9. "Léa" – 3:17
10. "Fatigante" – 2:51
11. "Tes yeux se moquent" – 3:09
12. "Vous avez l'heure" – 2:25
13. "Toute cette histoire" – 5:26
14. "Cracher nos souhaits" – 3:27

== Charts ==
Chart performance for Louise Attaque
Chart (1997)	Peak position
Belgian Albums (Ultratop Wallonia)	4
French Albums (SNEP)	1
