= Trafic (album) =

2018 album by Gaëtan Roussel

Studio album by Gaëtan Roussel
- Released: 29 September 2018
- Genre: Pop
- Length: 35:39
- Language: French
- Label: Barclay; Universal Music France
- Producer: Gaëtan Roussel; Jonas Myrin; Dimmi; Justin Stanley; Antoine Gaillet

Gaëtan Roussel chronology
Orpailleur (2013)	Trafic (2018)

Trafic is the third studio album by French singer-songwriter and guitarist Gaëtan Roussel, released on 29 September 2018 by Barclay and Universal Music France. The album was supported by the lead single "Hope", which tells the story of a florist with Alzheimer's disease who forgets the names of his flowers. It also features a duet with Vanessa Paradis on the track "Tu me manques (Pourtant tu es là)". Upon release, Trafic debuted in the top 20 of the French albums chart.

== Writing and recording ==
The album was written and recorded between Paris and various writing workshops in Los Angeles with several producers and songwriters based in each city; the "finishing touches" were put on the album in Los Angeles. Roussel acknowledged that the differences between the songwriters resulted in unique songs. He also stated that compared to Orpailleur (2013), he wanted an album with more clearly defined melodies and stories in the lyrics. This resulted in a "Franco–American alloy" of musical sensibilities, which was called an "unclassifiable" neo-pop album. It was also compared to the works of Nick Cave, who Roussel is a fan of, particularly his duet with Vanessa Paradis on "Tu me manques (Pourtant tu es là)".

== Critical reception ==
Professional ratings
Review scores
Source	Rating
Ici Musique	Positive
Télérama	2/5

François Marchesseault of Ici Musique complimented the album's 11 songs as "smart, melodious", as well as catchy and danceable, especially where contrasted with the darker and more serious content of the lyrics, as on "Hope", which addresses Alzheimer's disease. Although acknowledging that there were no songs as big as "Help Myself" from Roussel's album Ginger (2010), Marchesseault called it "so well done, so enjoyable compared to other productions of the moment".

Valérie Lehoux of Télérama pointed out that the album contains several elements characteristic of Roussel's style, such as his alternation between French and English in certain songs, prominent use of choruses, and mixing litany and excitement, that Roussel also utilises in his work with the band Louise Attaque. Lehoux felt that although the album contains singles with "radio potential" ("Hope" and the Paradis duet), it lacks strength because more serious themes on the album (like Roussel singing about death and oblivion) are not fully realised and that the more "polished and proper production [...] trivialises" Roussel's nasal voice. Lehoux concluded that despite this, Roussel will recover.

== Track listing ==
No.	Title	Length
1.	"Le Jour et la Nuit"	3:11
2.	"Hope"	2:58
3.	"Je veux bien, je ne sais pas"	2:48
4.	"Tu me manques (Pourtant tu es là)" (with Vanessa Paradis)	4:13
5.	"J'entends des voix"	3:06
6.	"N'être personne"	3:11
7.	"Dedans il y a de l'or"	2:37
8.	"Ne tombe pas"	3:33
9.	"Tellement peur"	2:41
10.	"La Question"	3:31
11.	"Début"	3:50
Total length:		35:39

== Charts ==
Chart (2018)	Peak position
Belgian Albums (Ultratop Wallonia)	25
French Albums (SNEP)	18
Swiss Albums (Schweizer Hitparade)	57
