= Mue =

Sixth studio album by Émilie Simon

Studio album by Émilie Simon
- Released: 17 March 2014
- Genre: French pop, rock
- Label: Barclay

Émilie Simon chronology
Franky Knight (2011)	Mue (2014)

Mue (French "the moulting") is Émilie Simon's sixth studio album, released by Barclay Records on 17 March 2014.

== Track listing ==
No.	Title	Lyrics	Length
1.	"Paris j'ai pris perpète"		3:54
2.	"Menteur"		4:03
3.	"Encre"		3:36
4.	"The Eye of the Moon"		3:54
5.	"Quand vient le jour"		3:12
6.	"Les Étoiles de Paris"		3:44
7.	"Des larmes"		3:56
8.	"Le Diamant"		3:43
9.	"Perdue dans tes bras"		4:18
10.	"Les Amoureux de minuit"		3:11
11.	"Wicked Games"	Chris Isaak	3:58

== Personnel ==
- Emilie Simon – vocals, keyboards and guitar
- Gary Barnacle – saxophones and flutes
- Nik Carter – saxophones and clarinets
- Jack Birchwood – trumpet
- Steven Fuller – trombone
- Nicolas Bauguil – guitars
- Tahiti Boy – keyboards
- Leon Michels – optigan
- Simon Edwards – bass
- Martyn Barker, Raphael Seguinier – drums
- Sally Herbert – strings
- Catherine Michel – harp
- Cyrille Brissot – programming
- Ian Caple – engineering and co-production
