= The Big Machine =

Studio album by Émilie Simon
- Released: (France) September 14, 2009
- Recorded: 2008–2009 (United States) Electric Lady Studios, NYC by Mark Plati (Canada) Wildsky Studios, Montreal
- Genre: Electropop
- Length: 47:11
- Label: Barclay

Émilie Simon chronology
L'Olympia (2007)	The Big Machine (2009)	Franky Knight (2011)

The Big Machine is the fourth studio album by French singer, composer and producer Émilie Simon, released on 14 September 2009, by Barclay. The album is completely in English; no French songs were included on the album. However, some songs have fragments in French.

== Promotion ==
Four viral videos have been posted on her official MySpace page. The videos include the same artwork used on her official website, created by AATOAA. The first one includes the full album version of "Dreamland" which is the lead single of the album. The second one includes a 36-second instrumental sample of "Chinatown". And, the third one includes a 50s snippet of "Rocket to the Moon". The fourth one appeared on her official site only promoting the digital release of the album, it includes "Rainbow".

The viral videos for "Dreamland", "Chinatown" and "Rocket to the Moon" were made available for free download from her official new website, launched on September 21 and designed by La Jungle Design.

Several songs from the album have been also performed live during her summer shows solo tour and other ones with her back band.

== Track listing ==
The album was released digitally on September 14, 2009, in France. The songs were composed by Émilie and co-written by English novelist Graham Joyce ("Rainbow", "Nothing to Do with You", "Fools Like Us", "The Way I See You" and "This Is Your World") and Faroese singer-songwriter Teitur Lassen ("Rocket to the Moon").

All tracks are written by Émilie Simon, except where noted.

No.	Title	Lyrics	Length
1.	"Rainbow"	Émilie Simon, Graham Joyce	4:19
2.	"Dreamland"		4:15
3.	"Nothing to Do with You"	Émilie Simon, Graham Joyce	2:54
4.	"Chinatown"		3:13
5.	"Ballad of the Big Machine"		5:46
6.	"The Cycle"		4:12
7.	"Closer"		3:55
8.	"The Devil at My Door"		5:02
9.	"Rocket to the Moon"	Teitur Lassen	3:25
10.	"Fools Like Us"	Émilie Simon, Graham Joyce	3:22
11.	"The Way I See You"	Émilie Simon, Graham Joyce	3:29
12.	"This Is Your World"	Émilie Simon, Graham Joyce	3:19
Total length:			47:11

Opendisc bonus track
No.	Title	Length
13.	"Closer (acoustic)"	4:11

iTunes Store bonus track
No.	Title	Length
13.	"Can You Keep a Secret"	3:46

Fnac download bonus track
No.	Title	Length
13.	"Dreamland (acoustic)"	4:04
Total length:		51:20

December digital bonus tracks
No.	Title	Length
13.	"Rainbow (Émilie remix)"	3:18
14.	"Rainbow (acoustic)"	4:30
Total length:		54:57

== Release history ==
Date	Country	Label	Format
2009-09-14	France	Barclay	Digital download
2009-09-21	France	Barclay	CD
2009-10-20	United Kingdom	Wrasse	CD, Digital download
2010-06-04	Japan	Rambling	CD, Digital download
2011-04-26	United States	Le Plan	CD, LP, Digital download

== Singles ==
- "Dreamland" is the lead single from the album, it was made available for digital download on June 8, 2009. The download is a radio edit of the song that lasts 3:58. A music video for the song was released on YouTube in September.
- "Rainbow", a digital single is available for download from November 23, 2009. The single includes the radio edit of the song with a length of 3:38. A music video was released through her official YouTube channel on November 15, 2009.

== Other songs ==
Performed during the shows:

- "Mercy Street" (Peter Gabriel cover)
- "Smalltown Boy" (Bronski Beat cover)
- "The Ballad Of The Big Machine" (featuring Charlie Winston)

== Personnel ==
=== Engineering and production ===
- Mark Plati - recording
- Renaud Létang - mixing
- François Chevallier

=== Instruments ===
- Jeremy Gara - drums
- Darren Beckett - drums
- Adam Chilenski - bass
- Kelly Pratt - brass
- John Natchez - brass

== Charts ==
=== Album ===
Chart (2009)	Peak Position
French Album Charts	8
Belgian Album Charts (Wallonia)	11
Swiss Album Charts	36
