= Mickey 3D =

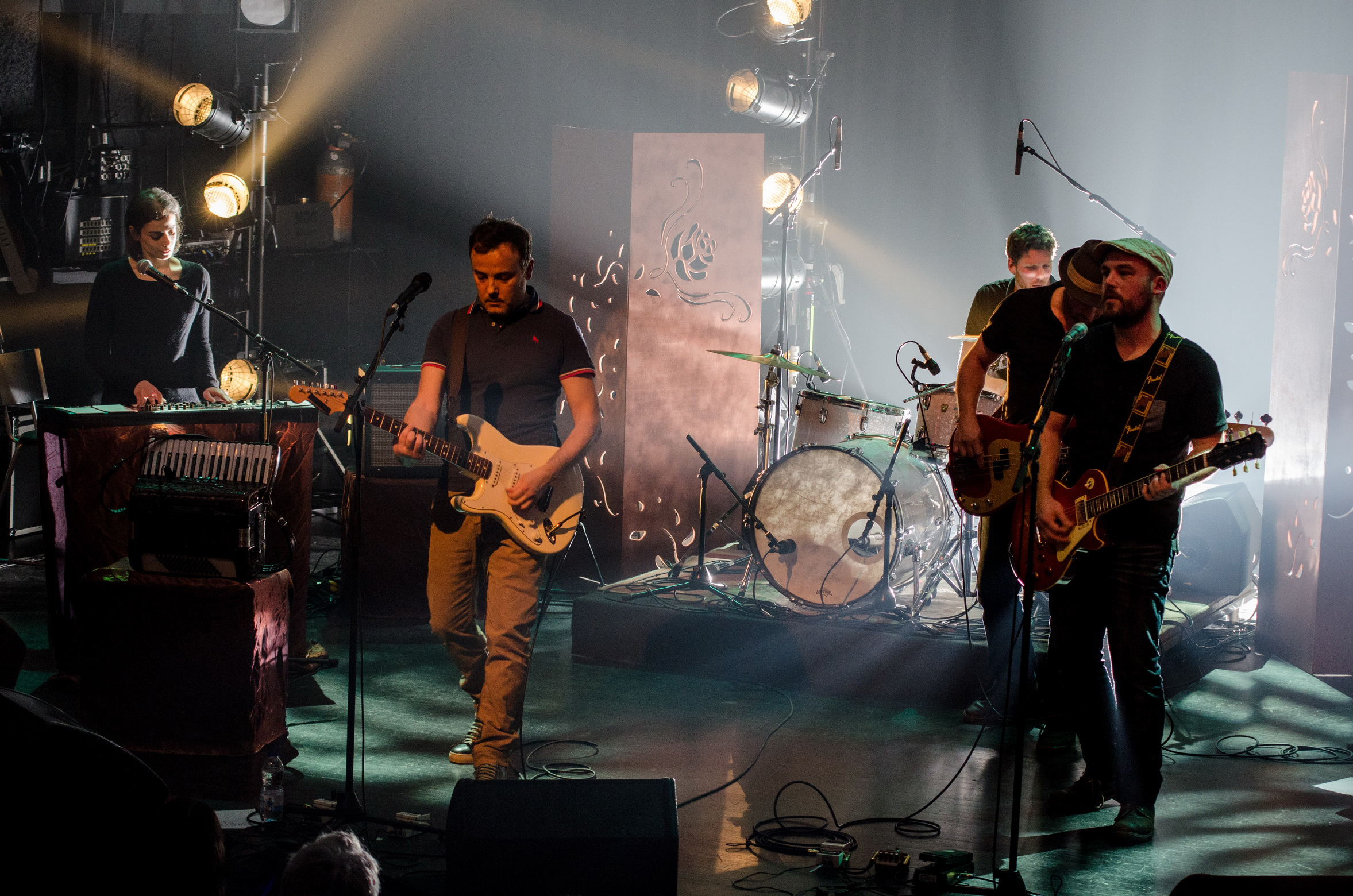
- Mickey 3D - live concert in 2016

Background information
- Origin: Montbrison, Loire (department)
- Genres: French rock, Chanson française
- Years active: 1996–present
- Labels: Premier Disque (1999); Virgin France (EMI) (since 2000); Moumkine Music (Since 2005)
- Members: Mickaël Furnon (Mickey); Aurélien Joanin (Jojo); Najah El Mahmoud
- Website: www.mickey3d.com

Mickey 3D is a French rock group from Montbrison, Loire; it was founded in 1997 when Mickaël Furnon alias Mickey and Aurélien Joanin alias Jojo parted from the local group 3Dk.

They have fronted for the group Louise Attaque, which had them play before their concerts. In 1999 they recorded their first album, Mistigri Torture. Since that time, inspired by artists such as Christophe Miossec, Mickey 3D have become known for rocking songs with critical lyrics and unusual sound elements. Their greatest commercially successful song, "Respire," reached Switzerland's top 10 in 2004.

== Discography ==
=== Albums ===
- First demo tapes: Le Souffle court (1996); Mickey 3D (1997); L'Amour (1998)
- Mistigri Torture (1999) – reedited by Virgin in 2000
- La Trêve (2001)
- Tu vas pas mourir de rire (2003)
- Live à Saint-Étienne (2004)
- Matador (2005)
- La grande évasion (2009)
- Sebolavy (2016)
- Nous étions des humains (2023)

=== Singles ===
- "La France a peur" (2000)
- "Tu dis mais ne sais pas" (2001)
- "Jeudi pop pop" (2001)
- "Ma grand-mère" (2002)
- "Respire" (2003)
- "Yalil (La fin des haricots)" (2003)
- "Ça m'étonne pas" (2003)
- "Johnny Rep" (2004)
- "Matador" (2005)
- "Les Mots" (2005)
- "La Mort du peuple" (2006)
- "Méfie-toi l'escargot" (2009)
- "Sous le soleil" (2021)
- "Emilie dansait" (2022)

== Awards ==
- 2003: Prix Constantin
- 2004: Victoires de la musique
  - Victoire for rock album of the year for Tu vas pas mourir de rire.
  - Victoire for music video of the year for Respire.
  - Victoire of original song of the year for "Respire."
