= Aspirator =

Aspirator may refer to:

- Aspirator (medical device), a suction device used to remove bodily fluids from a patient
- Aspirator (pump), a device producing vacuum by the Venturi effect in a constricted stream of fluid
- Aspirator (entomology), also known as pooter, a suction device used to collect insects

== See also ==
- Aspiration (disambiguation)
