= Franky Knight =

Studio album by Émilie Simon
- Released: December 5, 2011
- Label: Barclay
- Producer: Émilie Simon

Émilie Simon chronology
The Big Machine (2009)	Franky Knight (2011)	Mue (2014)

Singles from Franky Knight
- 1. "Mon Chevalier" Released: November 7, 2011

Franky Knight is Émilie Simon's fifth studio album, released in December 2011. Many tracks also serve as the soundtrack for La Délicatesse, a film based on the novel of the same title by David Foenkinos, which he co-directed with his brother Stéphane.

== Background ==
When David Foenkinos asked Émilie to write the soundtrack for La Délicatesse she already had some songs in mind for her next album that were very personal and she felt they were a perfect fit for the story.

Franky Knight makes reference to her fiancé and music partner, François Chevallier, who died of complications with Influenza A (H1N1) while on vacation in Athens, Greece. Chevallier died at 29 years, on September 15, 2009, a week before the release of their previous work together, The Big Machine. He also worked as sound engineer and producer with Coldplay, Arcade Fire and others.

== Track listing ==
All tracks are written by Émilie Simon, except where noted

No.	Title	Lyrics	Length
1.	"Mon Chevalier"		4:44
2.	"I Call It Love"		2:29
3.	"Holy Pool of Memories"	Émilie Simon, Graham Joyce	4:00
4.	"Something More"		4:09
5.	"Bel Amour"		2:37
6.	"Franky's Princess"		3:47
7.	"Sous les Étoiles"		3:19
8.	"Les Amants du Même Jour"		1:31
9.	"Walking with You"		3:44
10.	"Jetaimejetaimejetaime"		4:32

iTunes bonus tracks
No.	Title	Length
11.	"Walking with You" (instrumental)
12.	"Mon Chevalier" (instrumental)

== Singles ==
"Mon Chevalier"
No.	Title	Length
1.	"Mon Chevalier" (edit)	3:55

The lead single from the album, "Mon Chevalier", was released for digital download on November 7, 2011. The music video was uploaded to YouTube on November 2, 2011. It was directed by David and Stéphane Foenkinos.

== Charts ==
Chart (2011)	Peak position
Belgian Heatseekers Albums (Ultratop Wallonia)	1
French Albums (SNEP)	58
