= Birdy Nam Nam =

French band

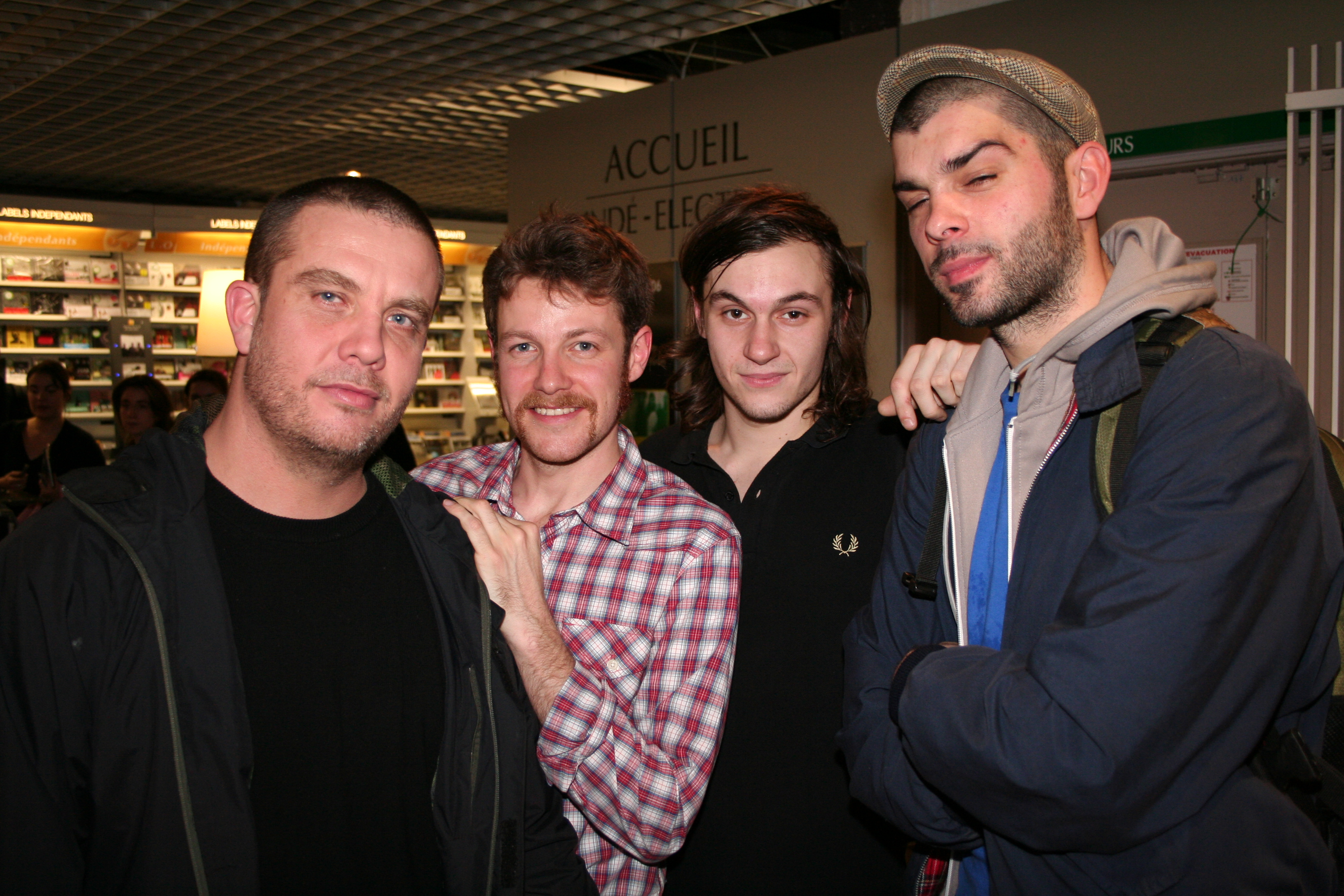
- From left to right: Crazy B, DJ Need, Little Mike, DJ Pone (2007)

Background information
- Origin: France
- Genre: Instrumental hip hop
- Years active: 2001–present
- Labels: Mishka, Owsla
- Members: Crazy-B; DJ Need; Little Mike
- Past members: DJ Pone

Birdy Nam Nam is a DJ crew from France. Birdy Nam Nam won several prizes throughout their career including the DMC Technics 2002 World TEAM Championships. Birdy Nam Nam's goal was to use the turntable player as an actual musical instrument. Their self-titled debut album was released in 2006 on Uncivilized World Records, and in March that year, they performed at the internationally renowned music conference SXSW. The group's name is taken from a line in the 1968 Peter Sellers film The Party, directed by Blake Edwards.

== History ==
Birdy Nam Nam sources their music from friends and their own albums, pressing beats and patterns into vinyl to assemble their music live.

In 2010, the band won the Electronic or Dance revelation of the year at the Victoires de la Musique. In 2012 they gained a wider audience in the Anglophone world thanks to Skrillex. At the Festival des Artefacts in Strasbourg, Skrillex played after Birdy Nam Nam and was impressed. He decided to remix their song Goin' In multiple times, and to release a remix album of BNN songs on his label Owsla.

== Discography ==
=== As featured artist ===
List of singles as featured performer, with selected chart positions and certifications, showing year released and album name
Title	Year	Peak chart positions						Certifications	Album
Title	Year	US	BEL (FL)	CAN	FRA	NZ	UK	Certifications	Album
"Wild for the Night" (ASAP Rocky featuring Skrillex and Birdy Nam Nam)	2013	80	63	65	169	38	43	RIAA: 2× Platinum; ARIA: Gold; IFPI DEN: Platinum; MC: Gold; RMNZ: 2× Platinum	Long. Live. ASAP
"—" denotes a recording that did not chart or was not released in that territory.

=== Albums ===
- Birdy Nam Nam (2005)
- Live (2006) Recorded live on 28 June 2006 at La Cigale (Paris)
- Manual For Successful Rioting (2009)
- Defiant Order (September 2011, re-released in 2013)
- Dance or Die (2016)

=== Other releases ===
- "Jazz It At Home"/"Body, Mind, Spirit" (vinyl)
- "Engineer Fear" (maxi vinyl)
- "The First Break Beat" (vinyl)
- "Trans Boulogne Express", December 2007 (maxi single)
- "Worried", (EP)
- "The Parachute Ending" (vinyl)
- "Goin' In", September 2011 (EP)
- "Jaded Future", 17 July 2012 (EP)
- "Defiant Order", 22 January 2013 (EP)
- "Defiant Order Remixes Project Vol. I: DJ Pone Selects", 7 July 2013 (EP)
- "Defiant Order Remixes Project Vol. II: DJ Need Selects", 14 July 2013 (EP)
- "Defiant Order Remixes Project Vol. III: Crazy B Selects", 21 July 2013 (EP)
- "Defiant Order Remixes Project Vol. IV: Lil' Mike Selects", 28 July 2013 (EP)

Birdy Nam Nam's song "Trans Boulogne Express" received mainstream recognition after it appeared in the movie Transporter 3.

== Awards ==
Independent Music Awards 2012: Defiant Order - Best Dance/Electronica Album

== See also ==
- Jazzanova
- Bugz in the Attic

== Bibliography ==
- (2006). "Eclectic Mix Results in Musical Tour de Force." Music Week. 21 January.
- Pareles, Jon (2006). "On a Mission to Make Soul Unpredictable." The New York Times. 9 April.
