= La Marche de l'Empereur (soundtrack) =

La Marche de l’empereur

Soundtrack album by Émilie Simon
- Released: January 13, 2005
- Genre: Pop, trip hop, techno
- Label: Barclay

Émilie Simon chronology
Émilie Simon (2003)	La Marche de l’empereur (2005)	Végétal (2006)

Alternative Cover
- Alternative French cover

Professional ratings
Review scores
Source	Rating
AllMusic	3.5/5 stars

La Marche de l'empereur is the original soundtrack to the film March of the Penguins (for the original French version). This critically acclaimed soundtrack was composed and performed by Émilie Simon. The album was nominated for Best Original Score in the 2006 César Awards, and won Best Original Soundtrack in the 2006 Victoires de la musique.

The soundtrack was replaced by a score by Alex Wurman for the English version of the film to fit its documentary approach.

== Track listing ==
All tracks are written by Simon (except for #14, which is credited to Keegan & Simon).

No.	Title	Length
1.	"The Frozen World"	4:23
2.	"Antarctic"	2:35
3.	"The Egg"	4:30
4.	"Song of the Sea"	2:04
5.	"Baby Penguins"	3:00
6.	"Attack of the Killer Birds"	2:48
7.	"Aurora Australis"	1:18
8.	"The Sea Leopard"	1:33
9.	"Song of the Storm"	3:15
10.	"Mother's Pain"	1:44
11.	"To the Dancers on the Ice"	3:15
12.	"All Is White"	3:19
13.	"The Voyage"	4:45
14.	"Footprints in the Snow" (bonus track)	2:44
15.	"Ice Girl" (bonus track)	3:29

== Charts ==
Chart (2005)	Peak position
French Albums Chart	32
Belgian Albums Chart (Wallonia)	80
Swiss Albums Chart	88
