= Manual For Successful Rioting =

Studio album by Birdy Nam Nam
- Released: 12 January 2009
- Genre: Electronic, turntablism
- Length: 47:53
- Label: Has Been, Jive Sbme Europe
- Producer: Yuksek, Justice

Birdy Nam Nam chronology
Worried (2008)	Manual For Successful Rioting (2009)	Defiant Order (2013)

Manual For Successful Rioting is the third album by French electronic turntable band Birdy Nam Nam. Released in 2009 with Has Been and Jive Sbme Europe on CD and LP formats, the record features production by Yuksek and includes co-production by Justice. On 5 December 2008 they performed at Transmusicales de Rennes. In which the definitive version of The Parachute Ending was released. The album was intended to be released in December 2008, but for unknown reasons was released in 2009.

== Track listing ==
No.	Title	Length
1.	"Red Dawn Rising"	4:52
2.	"Trans Boulogne Express" (Featuring Philippe Miro on guitar)	3:26
3.	"Love Your Enemy (Kill Your Friend)"	4:04
4.	"Bonne Nouvelle" (Featuring Vincent Ségal on cello, Philippe Miro on guitar, Cyril Atef on drums)	4:07
5.	"Manual For Successful Rioting" (Vocals by Etn)	3:44
6.	"War Paint"	3:31
7.	"Worried"	4:41
8.	"Space Cadet Apology"	5:01
9.	"Shut Up...!" (Featuring Newcleus)	4:38
10.	"Homosexuality"	3:58
11.	"The Parachute Ending" (Co-produced by Justice)	5:51
