= Gaëtan Roussel =

French singer, songwriter and composer (born 1972)

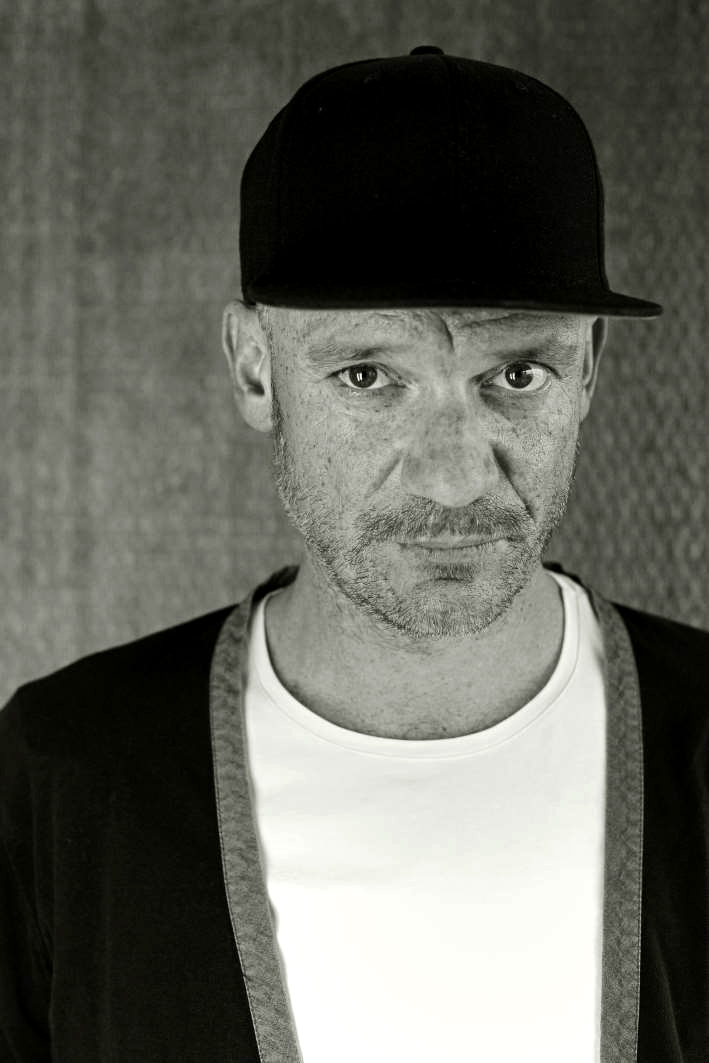
- Gaëtan Roussel, in 2014.

Background information
- Born: Gaëtan Roussel; 13 October 1972 (age 54); Rodez, Midi-Pyrénées (present-day Occitania), France
- Website: www.gaetanroussel.com

Gaëtan Roussel (French pronunciation: [ɡaetɑ̃ ʁusɛl]; born 13 October 1972, Rodez) is a French singer-songwriter and composer. Roussel is the former lead vocalist for the bands Louise Attaque and Tarmac.

Roussel embarked on a solo career and began recording an album in 2009. He released his debut solo album, Ginger, which was released on 15 March 2010. Ginger featured the lead single, "Help myself (Nous ne faisons que passer)" and the second single, "Dis-moi encore que tu m'aimes". He released the album Orpailleur in 2013 and Trafic in 2018.

== Discography ==
=== Albums ===
Year	Album	Peak positions			Certification
Year	Album	FRA	BEL (Wa)	SWI	Certification
2010	Ginger	7	6	53	
2013	Orpailleur	11	17	52	
2018	Trafic	18	25	57	
2021	Est-ce que tu sais?	7	8	—	
2023	Eclect!que	6	18	35	France: Gold
2025	Marjolaine	71	70	35	

=== Singles ===
Year	Single	Peak positions				Album
Year	Single	FRA	BEL (Fl)	BEL (Wa)	SWI	Album
2009	"Help Myself (Nous ne faisons que passer)"	4	—	3	63	Ginger
2010	"Inside / Outside"	—	—	9 (Ultratip)	—	Ginger
2010	"Dis-moi encore que tu m'aimes"	91	42 (Ultratip)	14	—	Ginger
2011	"Des hauts, des bas" (with Florent Marchet)	—	—	40	—	
2013	"Éolienne"	140	—	22 (Ultratip)	—	Orpailleur
