= Comme on a dit =

Studio album by Louise Attaque
- Released: 9 February 2000
- Genre: French rock
- Length: 45:24
- Language: French
- Label: Atmosphériques
- Producer: Gordon Gano, Warren Bruleigh

Louise Attaque chronology
Louise Attaque (1997)	Comme on a dit (2000)	À plus tard crocodile (2005)

Comme on a dit is the second album by French rock band Louise Attaque. Although darker and consequently less radio friendly than the debut album, the album sold 700.000 copies in France.

== Track listing ==
1. "Qu'est ce qui nous tente?" - 2:44
2. "Tu dis rien" - 2:22
3. "Sans filet" - 4:23
4. "D'amour en amour" - 1:20
5. "Tout passe" - 2:22
6. "L'Intranquillité" - 3:47
7. "Comme on a dit" - 4:51
8. "Pour un oui, pour un non" - 2:12
9. "Faut se le dire" - 2:33
10. "La plume" - 3:56
11. "Justement" - 2:40
12. "La ballade de basse" - 8:17
13. "Du nord au sud" - 4:57

== Charts ==
=== Weekly charts ===
Chart (2000)	Peak position
Belgian Albums (Ultratop Wallonia)	1
French Albums (SNEP)	1
Swiss Albums (Schweizer Hitparade)	10

=== Year-end charts ===
Chart (2000)	Position
Belgian Albums (Ultratop Wallonia)	7
French Albums (SNEP)	7
Swiss Albums (Schweizer Hitparade)	94
Chart (2001)	Position
French Albums (SNEP)	99

== Certifications ==
Region	Certification	Certified units/sales
Belgium (BEA)	Gold	25,000^{*}
^{*} Sales figures based on certification alone.
