= Ménélik =

- Birth name: Albert Tjamag
- Born: 10 September 1970 (age 54)
- Origin: Yaoundé, Cameroon
- Genres: Hip hop
- Occupations: Rapper; singer
- Years active: 1995–present
- Labels: Polydor
- Website: Official site

Ménélik (Albert Tjamag; born 10 September 1970), is a Cameroonian-French rapper and singer.

== Biography ==
He went to France at the age of nine. Then he met MC Solaar and started to write songs for artists such as No Sé, DJ Jimmy Jay and RPM. In 1995, he released his first album entitled Phenomenelik and performed at Solaar's shows. He toured across Europe and gained a Victoire de la Musique in 1996 in the category 'Male revelation of the year'. In 1997, he released his second album Je me souviens which provided the number five hit "Bye-Bye".

== Discography ==
=== Albums ===
- 1995 : Phénoménélik – #33
- 1997 : Je me souviens – #46
- 2000 : OQP
- 2001 : E-Pop
- 2008 : Mnlk Project 2.0
- 2017 : Qlassiks

=== Singles ===
- 1995 : "Quelle aventure !" (with No Sé) – #8
- 1995 : "Tout baigne" (with La Tribu) – #16
- 1997 : "Je me souviens" – #30
- 1998 : "Bye-Bye" – #5
- 1999 : "Touché" – #35
- 2000 : "Je t'aime comme t'es" – #59

Preceded by Gérald de Palmas	Victoires de la Musique; Male revelation of the year 1996	Succeeded by -
