= Émilie Simon =

French singer, songwriter and composer

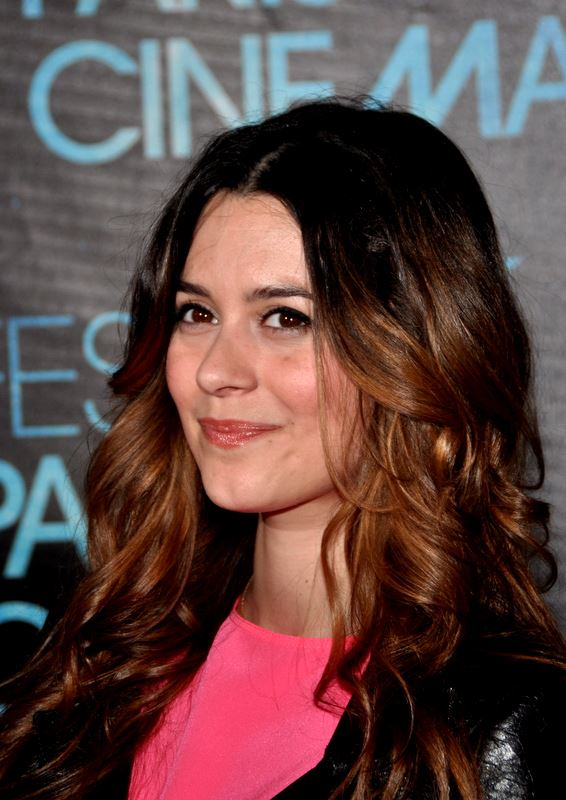
- Émilie Simon in 2012

Background information
- Born: 17 July 1978 (age 48); Montpellier, Occitanie, France
- Genres: Electronic music, trip hop, experimental music
- Occupations: Singer, songwriter, composer
- Years active: 2003–present
- Labels: Barclay (2003–present); Le Plan Music (US only)
- Website: emiliesimon.com

Émilie Simon (French pronunciation: [emili simɔ̃]; born 1978 in Montpellier, Occitanie, France) is a French singer, songwriter and composer of electronic music.

== Music ==
=== Émilie Simon ===
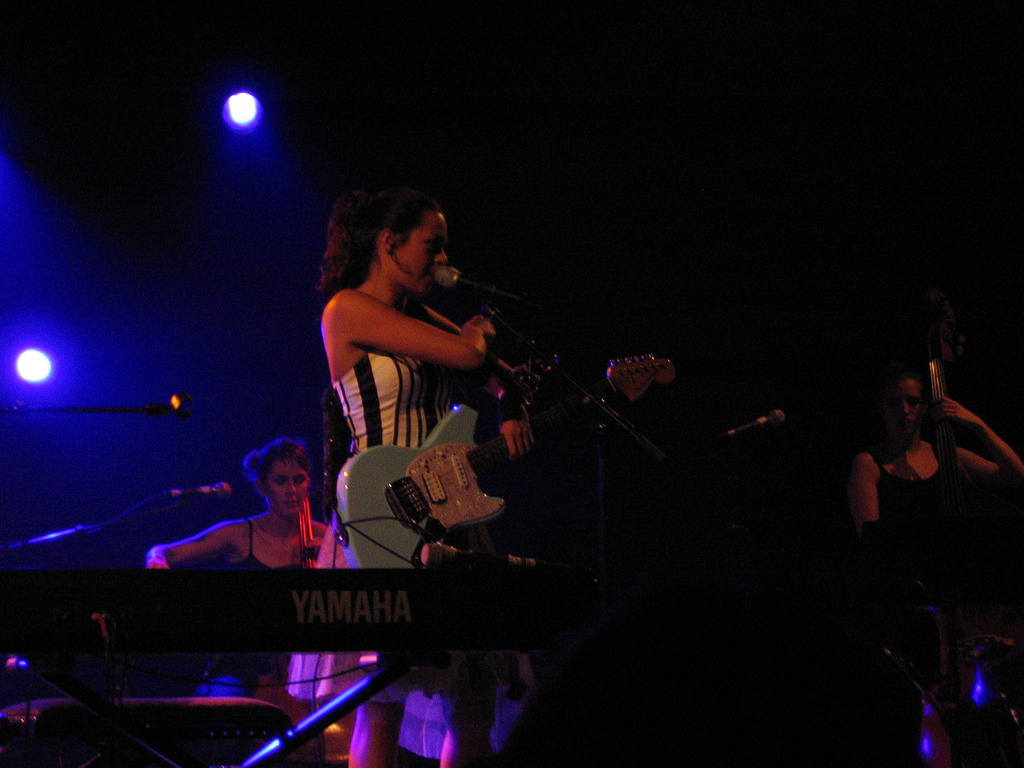
Live at the Paleo Festival, 23 July 2004

In May 2003, she released her debut album Émilie Simon. The electronic album was critically acclaimed and went on to become a commercial success. To promote her album, she did numerous live performances and TV appearances all over France. In 2004, she was rewarded with a Victoire de la musique in the 'Electronic Album' category for the album.

Two music videos were made to promote Émilie Simon, for the songs "Désert" and "Flowers". The English version of "Désert" had an identical music video to the French version. Émilie Simon was also re-released in certain parts of the world with additional tracks. Despite having been released for over three years, the album was still charting in the French mid-price album charts in late January 2007.

More recently, Émilie Simon has begun performing and releasing CDs in the United States. Her first U.S. release, The Flower Book, came out November 2006. The release was followed by a brief tour to New York and Los Angeles. In April 2007 Émilie released her second recording in the United States, The March of the Empress, and a third, The Big Machine, in 2011.

=== La Marche de l'Empereur ===
Wishing to orient her second album towards a more wintry or polar setting, Émilie Simon proceeded to record sounds which relate to coldness such as the sounds of smashing ice and footsteps in the snow. Coincidentally, in the midst of her search for sounds for the album, she was contacted by producer Luc Jacquet to compose the original soundtrack for his documentary film La Marche de l'empereur (March of the Penguins in English), concerning the annual migration of emperor penguins.

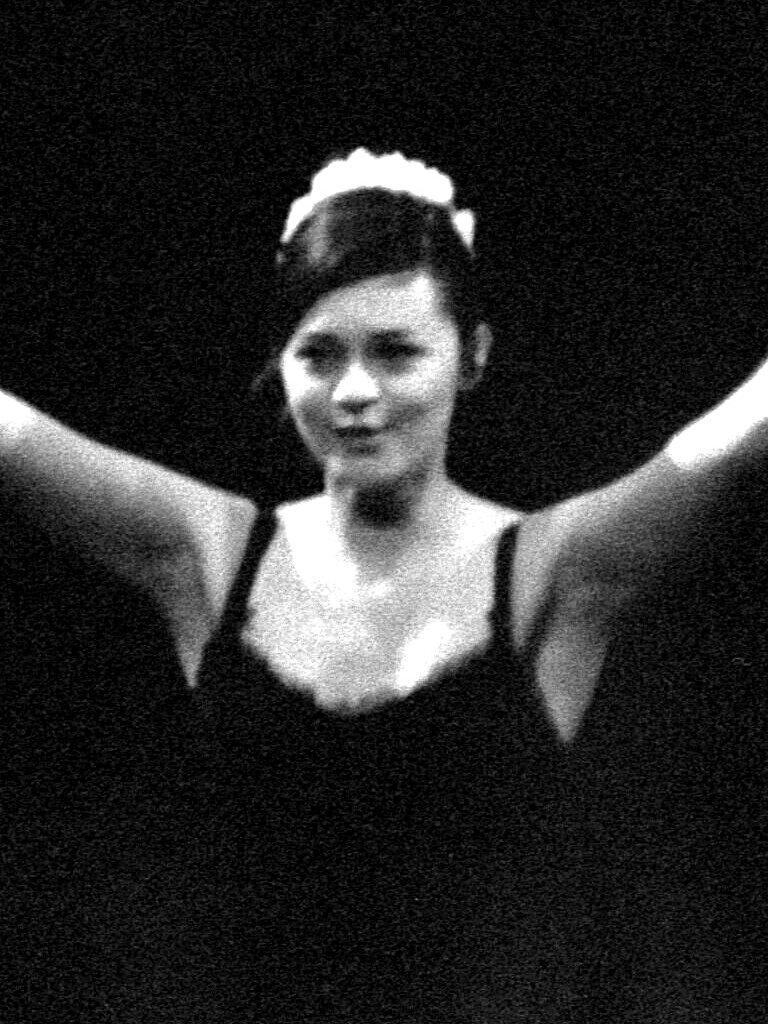
Émilie Simon, Octogone, 2004

The film was released in France in early 2005, featuring a soundtrack by Simon that was also released by Universal Music as her second album. In 2006 she won the Victoire de la Musique in the "Film Soundtrack" category and was nominated for a César Award for the best film music composition. The version of March of the Penguins that was released in the United States and in English Canada used a more traditional documentary soundtrack scored by Alex Wurman, as the local producers feared that the Simon soundtrack would be too challenging for North American viewers (the only cinemas in North America to screen the film with the Simon soundtrack were those of the French circuit in the province of Quebec). The Canadian DVD version of the film offers both the French version with Simon's soundtrack and the American version with that of Alex Wurman.

=== Végétal and international success ===
In 2006, Émilie Simon released her third album, Végétal, in which she uses the sounds of plants, as hinted by the name. The lyrics play with words, always relating to flora. The album also contains more elements of rock music. This comes forward in some of the more lively tracks, such as "Fleur de Saison", where she plays an electric guitar. The sound remains nonetheless that of electronic music while her voice maintains its candor, softness, and beauty.

A music video has been aired for the first single "Fleur de saison", the second one called "Dame de Lotus" has also been already aired. The album utilizes Opendisc technology which enables access to special content such as songs and music videos on her official website. Végétal is her only album to have more than one cover image. Currently, three separate covers exist for the album.

In late 2006, she released The Flower Book in the USA (April 2007 in Canada), a compilation album of her first three records, with some added material from her short international tour which included stops in New York and Los Angeles. She also used MySpace to convey messages to fans. Furthermore, "Désert" was released in vinyl in the US. The track "Rose hybride de thé", originally from Végétal, is officially the first single release intended for US audiences.

On 5 March 2007, Émilie Simon released her first live album, titled À l'Olympia. The set exists as a sole CD or DVD, and contains live footage from a concert recorded on 19 September 2006. Songs from all of three of her albums are present in the recording.

As a follow-up to Simon's debut U.S. release, The Flower Book, La Marche de l'Empereur was released on 3 April 2007.

== Concerts ==
During her stage performances, she performs alongside IRCAM's Cyrille Brissot who directs the programme.

On 1 July 2005, at the Eurockéennes of Belfort, she gave a live concert with the participation of Synfonietta de Belfort and the Lyon percussion group. She worked with both of these ensembles again in a second concert, 19 January 2006 at Le Grand Rex in Paris. She then toured with Placebo, doing the first part of their tour from 29 September 2006 until 4 December 2006. She has also done numerous concerts abroad, in Germany, Australia and the U.S..

In September 2010 Emilie traveled to China for a short China tour with local promoters Split Works, stopping at the Dragon Valley Festival and in Shanghai and Hong Kong.

== Philosophy ==
In a 2009 Interview with New York Music News, Simon explained how she came to record electronic music: "At the beginning, I was writing my songs with the piano and the guitar and writing the lyrics and the music. And then, I started using the computer just, you know, to record. So that's how I started the production side...".

== Discography ==
=== Albums ===
==== Studio albums ====
Year	Album	Peak positions			Certifications
Year	Album	FR	BEL (Wa)	SUI	Certifications
2003	Émilie Simon	47	–	–	
2006	Végétal	11	33	44	
2009	The Big Machine	8	11	36	
2011	Franky Knight	58	–	–	
2014	Mue	16	–	–	

==== Extended plays ====
Year	Album	Peak positions		
Year	Album	FR	BEL (Wa)	SUI
2007	Live Session EP	–	–	–
2020	Mars on Earth 2020	–	–	–

==== Soundtrack albums ====
Year	Album	Peak positions		
Year	Album	FR	BEL (Wa)	SUI
2005	La Marche de l'Empereur	32	80	88
2018	The Jesus Rolls	–	–	–

==== Live albums ====
Year	Album	Peak positions
Year	Album	FR
2007	L'Olympia	117

==== Compilation albums ====
Year	Album	Peak positions
Year	Album	FR
2006	The Flower Book	–

=== Singles ===
- "Désert" (2002)
- "Flowers" (2003)
- "Song of the Storm" (2005)
- "Fleur de Saison" (2006)
- "Rose Hybride de Thé" (2006)
- "Dame de Lotus" (2007)
- "Dreamland" (2009)
- "Rainbow" (2009)
- "Ballad of the Big Machine" featuring Charlie Winston (2010)
- "Mon Chevalier" (2011)
- "Jetaimejetaimejetaime" (2012)
- "Menteur" (2014)
- "Cette ombre" (2020)
- "En attendant l'aurore" (2020)
- "Mars on Earth 2020" (2020)
- "Un nouveau monde" (2020)
- "162" (2020)
- "Last Christmas" (2021)

== Awards and nominations ==
=== Victoires de la musique ===
- 2004: Electronic Music/Groove/Dance album of the year for Émilie Simon.
- 2006: Original Film or Television soundtrack of the year for La Marche de l'empereur.
- 2007: Electronic/groove/dance album of the year for Végétal

=== Nominations ===
- At the Prix Constantin in 2003 for the album Émilie Simon.
- At the Césars in 2006 for Best Original Soundtrack with La Marche de l'empereur.

== Decorations ==
- Chevalier of the Order of Arts and Letters (2016)

== Film and documentary ==
- 2005: Soundtrack of film La Marche de L'Empereur.
- 2011: Her record Franky Knight is the soundtrack of French movie La Délicatesse (Translated: Delicacy).
- 2012: Simon is taking part in Jérémie Carboni's documentary film Musique(s) électronique(s).
