= William Sheller =

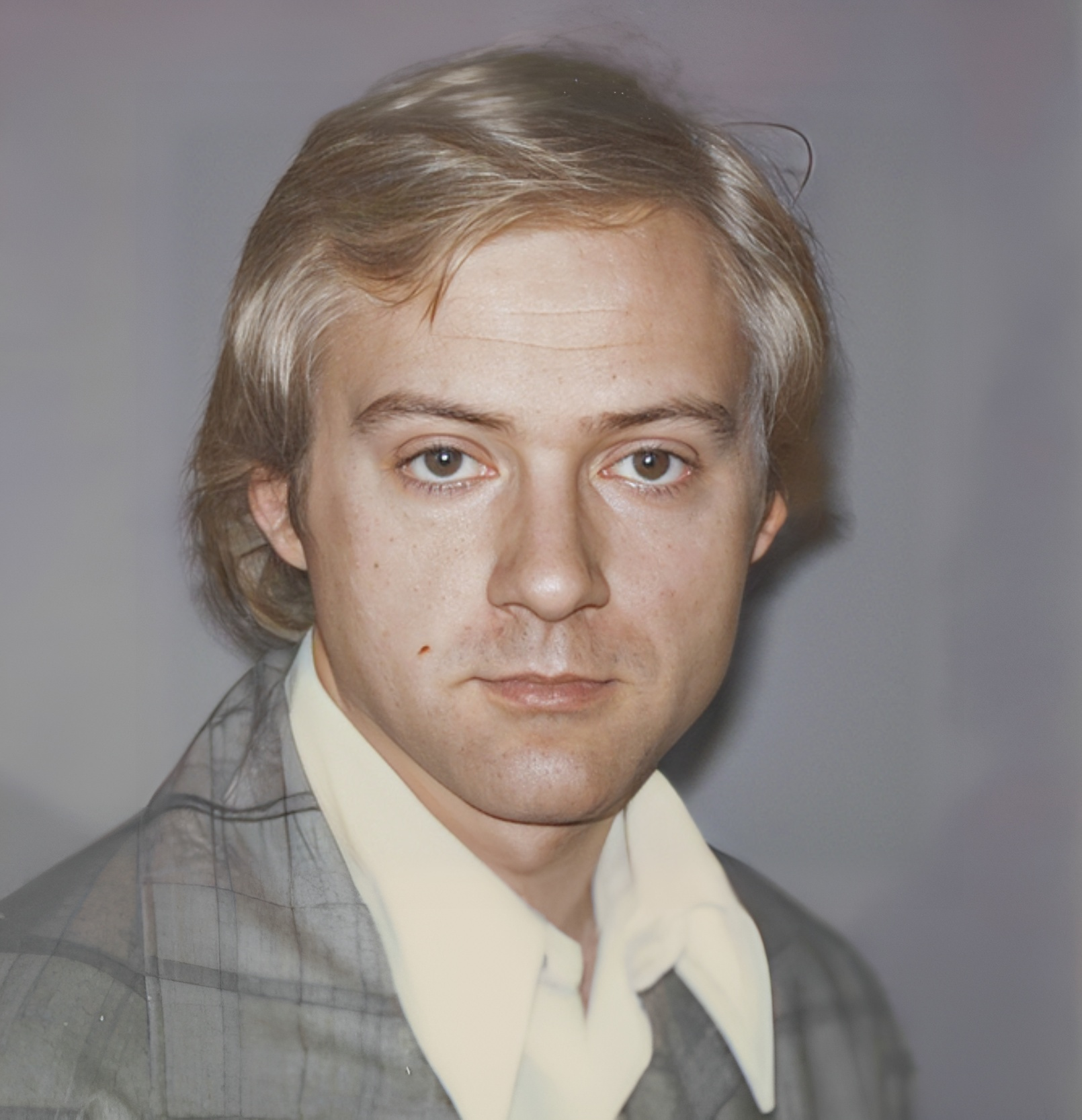
- Sheller in 1976

Background information
- Born: William Desbœuf; July 9, 1946 (age 80)
- Genres: Chanson, Pop rock, Progressive rock, Symphonic rock, Instrumental
- Instruments: Piano, Sitar
- Years active: 1968-2016
- Label: Universal Music Group

William Sheller (born William Desbœuf) on 9 July 1946) is a French classical composer and singer-songwriter.

An artist of French popular music since the 1970s, William Sheller has the particularity of being one of the few singers of French chanson who has benefited from a background in classical music. This has influenced his repertoire with a musical style, combining elements of classical music with chanson and symphonic rock.

== Biography ==
Born in Paris to an American soldier and a French mother, William Desbœuf was raised in Ohio until he was 7. He then went back to France to live with his mother's parents, who worked in the Théâtre des Champs-Élysées and the Palais Garnier.

William left school at 16 to study composition with teacher Yves Margat (himself a student of Gabriel Fauré) and later harmony, fugue and counterpoint at the Paris Conservatory. He was training for the Prix de Rome but turned to pop music after hearing the Beatles. Since then, Sheller has had a successful career both as a classical composer and as a pop singer. His works often mix both genres. For example, some of his songs include carefully crafted orchestral passages (the Baroque introduction to Le nouveau monde) as well as instruments that are seldom found in pop music (such as a horn in Les miroirs dans la boue and a clarinet in Fier et fou de vous). On the other hand, his Lux aeterna is written for orchestra, choir and rock band. He has toured several times with transcriptions of his songs for voice and orchestra as well as for voice and piano quintet.

Additionally, he has also written film music (Titanic) and songs or arrangements for other artists (Dalida, Joe Dassin, Barbara... etc.).

The "Introït" from his Lux aeterna (1972) was heavily sampled for the title track from Deltron 3030 (2000), produced by Dan the Automator.

== Music ==
=== Classical works ===
- 1972: Lux aeterna
- 1977: La sirène ballet for the Paradis Latin
- 1984: String quartets "Book 1 and 2" by "Quatuor Pasquier"
- 1985: Suite française
- 1990: Cello concerto
- 1992: Symphonie pour un jeune orchestre
- 1993: Trumpet concerto
- 1994: Symphonie alternative
- 1995: Symphonie de poche
- 1998: Élégies pour violoncelle et orchestre
- 2003: New recording of the string quartets "Book 1 & 2" + "Les Viennois" by the Parisii Quartet
- 2004: Symphony in three movements "Sully"
- 2006: Recording of symphonic works in Ostinato

=== Albums ===
- 1975: Rock'n dollars
- 1976: Dans un vieux rock'n'roll
- 1977: Symphoman
- 1980: Nicolas
- 1981: J'suis pas bien
- 1982: Olympia 82 (live)
- 1983: Simplement
- 1984: Wiliam Sheller et le quatuor Halvenalf (live)
- 1986: Univers
- 1989: Ailleurs
- 1991: Sheller en solitaire (live)
- 1993: Le nouveau monde
- 1994: Albion
- 1995: Olympiade (live)
- 2000: Les machines absurdes
- 2001: Live au Théâtre des Champs-Élysées (live)
- 2004: Épures
- 2005: Parade au Cirque Royal (live – filmed concert, available on DVD)
- 2008: Avatars
- 2015: Stylus

=== Singles ===
- 1968: "Couleurs"
- 1968: "Les 4 saisons"
- 1969: "Adieu Kathy"
- 1969: "Leslie Simone"
- 1970: "Living East, Dreaming West"
- 1970: "She Opened the Door"
- 1976: "Saint-Exupery Airway"
- 1976: "Fier et fou de vous"
- 1976: "J'me gênerai pas pour dire que j't'aime encore"
- 1976: "La toccatarte" (with Catherine Lara)
- 1976: "Les petites filles modèles"
- 1982: "Message urgent"
- 1982: "Rosanna Banana"
- 1983: "Chanson lente"
- 1983: "Les filles de l'aurore"
- 1983: "Mon Dieu que j'l'aime"
- 1984: "I keep movin' on"
- 1991: "Un homme heureux"
- 1993: "Vienne"
- 1998: "Centre ville"
- 2008: "Tout ira bien"

=== Compilations ===
- 1987: Master série
- 1993: Carnet de notes
- 1998: Tu devrais chanter
- 2004: Promenade française
- 2005: Chemin de traverse (totalling his 30 years of songs)
- 2016: Préférences (totalling his 40 years of songs)

=== Film music ===
- 1969: Soundtrack from the film Erotissimo
- 1980: Soundtrack from the film Retour en force
- 1981: Soundtrack from the film Ma femme s'appelle reviens
- 1988: Soundtrack from the film Envoyez les violons
- 1993: Soundtrack from the film L'écrivain public
- 1997: Soundtrack from the film Arlette
