= Maintenance respiration =

Amount of cellular respiration needed for an organism to maintain itself

Maintenance respiration (or maintenance energy) refers to metabolism occurring in an organism that is needed to maintain that organism in a healthy, living state. Maintenance respiration contrasts with growth respiration, which is responsible for the synthesis of new structures in growth, nutrient uptake, nitrogen (N) reduction and phloem loading, whereas maintenance respiration is associated with protein and membrane turnover and maintenance of ion concentrations and gradients.

== In plants ==
Maintenance respiration in plants refers to the amount of cellular respiration, measured by the carbon dioxide (CO_{2}) released or oxygen (O_{2}) consumed, during the generation of usable energy (mainly ATP, NADPH, and NADH) and metabolic intermediates used for (i) resynthesis of compounds that undergo renewal (turnover) in the normal process of metabolism (examples are enzymatic proteins, ribonucleic acids, and membrane lipids); (ii) maintenance of chemical gradients of ions and metabolites across cellular membranes that are necessary for cellular integrity and plant health; and (iii) operation of metabolic processes involved in physiological adjustment (i.e., acclimation) to a change in the plant's environment. The metabolic costs of the repair of injury from biotic or abiotic stress may also be considered a part of maintenance respiration.

Maintenance respiration is essential for biological health and growth of plants. It is estimated that about half of the respiration carried out by terrestrial plants during their lifetime is for the support of maintenance processes. Because typically more than half of global terrestrial plant photosynthesis (or gross primary production) is used for plant respiration, more than one quarter of global terrestrial plant photosynthesis is presumably consumed in maintenance respiration.

Maintenance respiration is a key component of most physiologically based mathematical models of plant growth, including models of crop growth and yield and models of ecosystem primary production and carbon balance.
