= Respire (song) =

Single by Mickey 3D

from the album Tu vas pas mourir de rire
- B-side: "Chanson de rien du tout"
- Released: March 2003
- Genre: Pop rock
- Length: 3:45
- Label: Virgin, EMI Music
- Songwriter(s): Mickaël Furnon; Najah El Mahmoud; Aurelien Joanin

Mickey 3D singles chronology
"Ma grand-mère" (2003)	"Respire" (2003)	"Yalil (La fin des haricots)" (2003)

"Respire" is one of Mickey 3D's most popular songs. Released in March 2003, it met success in France, Belgium and Switzerland. Like many French rock songs the topic is about a controversial and realistic subject, in this case, the environment and its destruction.

== Lyrics and music ==
The text of the song addresses a "kid" to alert him about the state of the world that adults will leave to him. The first part of the song deals with the story of humans' arrival on Earth and their disturbance of the whole balance of nature. The second part imagines the future of people if they continue to do so (referring to the disappearance of natural resources, animals and even genetic modification because of pollution) and how the "kid" will try to explain to his grandchildren why he did nothing to prevent it. The third part speaks about the state of slavery, misery, and shame of the human species as well as the unpredictability of its future.

== Music video ==
The music video was produced as an animated feature, co-directed by Jerôme Combe, Stéphane Hamache and André Bessy. It represents a little girl running in what is believed to be nature, before discovering little by little it is actually a synthetic nature, reconstituted in a studio.

== Awards and chart performances ==
In France, "Respire" won two Victoires de la musique in 2004 : one for the best song of the year, the other for the best music video. It was charted for 25 weeks on the French singles chart. After a beginning at #26 on March 29, 2003, it climbed to #12, its peak position, that it reached again in its ninth week. It remained for six weeks in the top 20 and 15 weeks in the top 50, and was eventually certified Silver disc by the SNEP.

In Belgium (Wallonia), the single went to #35 on April 5, 2003, and climbed until reaching #6 in its fifth week. Thereafter, it almost kept on dropping on the chart and totalled eight weeks in the top ten and 18 weeks on the chart (top 40).

In Switzerland, "Respire" featured on the chart for 16 weeks (from April 13 to July 27), 11 of them in the top 50, with a peak at #10 on May 18.

== Track listings ==
CD single

1. "Respire" — 3:45
2. "Chanson de rien du tout" — 2:49
3. "Respire" (club 80) — 3:45
4. "Respire" (music video) — 3:45

== Charts and sales ==
=== Weekly charts ===
Chart (2003)	Peak position
Belgian (Wallonia) Singles Chart	6
French SNEP Singles Chart	12
Swiss Singles Chart	10

=== Year-end charts ===
Chart (2003)	Position
Belgian (Wallonia) Singles Chart	26
French Airplay Chart	35
French TV Music Videos Chart	32
French Singles Chart	56
Swiss Singles Chart	95

=== Certifications and sales ===
Certifications for "Respire "
Region	Certification	Certified units/sales
France (SNEP)	Silver	125,000^{*}
^{*} Sales figures based on certification alone.
