= Émilie Simon (album) =

Studio album by Émilie Simon
- Released: May 27, 2003
- Recorded: 2002–2003
- Studios: Le Louxor (Paris), Studio de la Seine (Paris), Studio Village (Paris)
- Genres: Pop, trip hop
- Labels: Barclay, Universal
- Producer: Émilie Simon

Émilie Simon chronology
Émilie Simon (2003)	La Marche de l'Empereur (2005)

Émilie Simon is the debut album of Émilie Simon. The album was a commercial and critical success, winning a Victoire de la musique in 2004 for Best Electronic Album. Critics called her "France's answer to Iceland's alternative pop princess Björk." Simon wrote, composed and produced the bulk of the album by herself. The album was re-issued in December 2003, months after its release.

== Release ==
In October 2002, Simon released promotion single "Désert". The song was a huge success both critically and commercially in her homeland. In the United States, a single for the English version was released in late 2006. The music video for the song was directed by Philippe André and produced by Wanda.

== Track listing ==
All lyrics are written by Émilie Simon; all music is composed by Émilie Simon, except where noted.

Regular edition
No.	Title	Writer(s)	Length
1.	"Désert"	Émilie Simon, David Masse	3:03
2.	"Lise"		3:55
3.	"Secret"		3:57
4.	"Il pleut"		3:31
5.	"I Wanna Be Your Dog"	Dave Alexander, Ron Asheton, Scott Asheton, Iggy Pop	2:42
6.	"To the Dancers in the Rain"		2:42
7.	"Dernier lit"	Émilie Simon, David Masse	3:06
8.	"Graines d'étoiles" (feat. Perry Blake)		3:00
9.	"Flowers"		2:33
10.	"Vu d'ici"		3:48
11.	"Blue Light"		3:06
12.	"Chanson de toile"		4:02

Re-issue bonus tracks
No.	Title	Writer(s)	Length
13.	"Desert" (English Version)		3:04
14.	"Femme Fatale" (feat. Tim Keegan)	Lou Reed	3:56

Japanese edition bonus tracks
No.	Title	Length
13.	"Desert" (English Version)	3:04
14.	"Femme Fatale" (feat. Tim Keegan)	3:56
15.	"Solène"	3:26
16.	"Désert" (Thievery Corporation Mix)	3:16

Limited Edition Bonus disc
No.	Title	Length
1.	"Desert" (English Version)	3:04
2.	"Solène"	3:26
3.	"Femme Fatale" (feat. Tim Keegan)	3:56
4.	"Désert" (Avril Puzzle Mix)	5:05

== Charts ==
Chart (2003)	Peak position
French Album Charts	47
