= Louise Attaque =

French rock music group

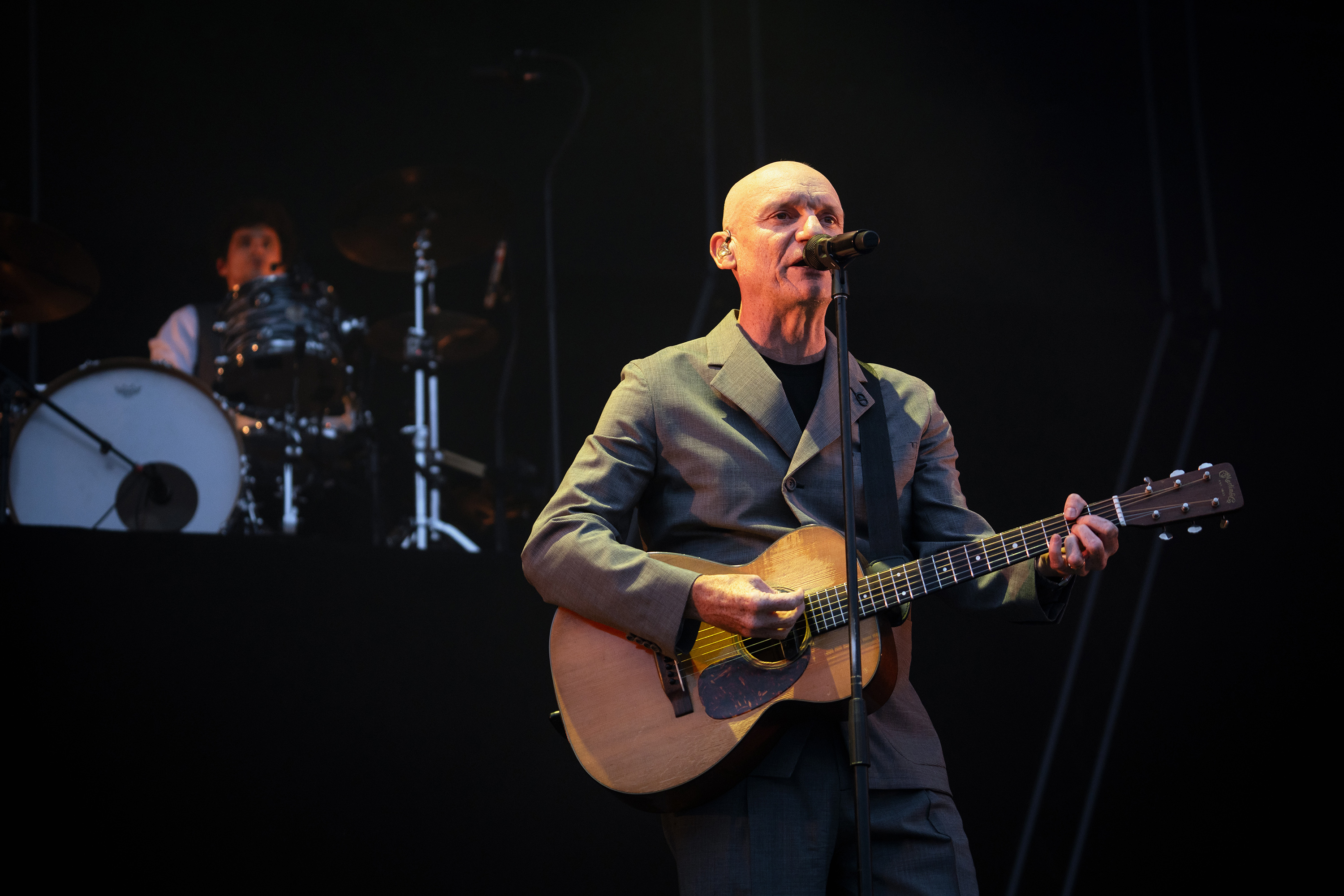
- Lead singer and guitarist Gaëtan Roussel at a Louise attaque concert in 2023

Background information
- Origin: Paris, France
- Genres: French rock Art rock Folk rock
- Years active: 1994–2001 unofficial four-year hiatus 2005–2007; 2007-present
- Labels: Atmosphériques (Worldwide); Ki/oon Music Inc. (Japan)
- Members: Gaëtan Roussel (vocals, guitar); Arnaud Samuel (violin); Robin Feix (bass guitar); Alexandre Margraff (drums)
- Website: http://www.louiseattaque.com

Louise Attaque (French pronunciation: [lwiz atak]) is a French chanson/folk rock band founded in 1994. Several of the group's albums were produced by Gordon Gano, lead singer of Violent Femmes, a band whom Louise Attaque often cites as an influence and for whom their own band is named. The band is signed to the Atmosphériques record label.

== History ==
=== Caravage (1990-1994) ===
Lead singer and guitarist Gaëtan Roussel and bassist Robin Feix met in high school in Montargis. They moved to Paris after graduation where they met drummer Alexandre Margraff and formed a rock band named Caravage (after the Italian painter Caravaggio). After briefly hiring a lead guitarist, the band met violinist Arnaud Samuel while recording in a Parisian studio.

=== Louise Attaque's success (1997-2001) ===
Louise Attaque was formed in 1994. The name means "Louise Attacks" in French and refers to Louise Michel, a 19th-century anarchist, and to the American rock band Violent Femmes (which loosely translates from French as "violent women"). The leader of Violent Femmes, Gordon Gano, produced Louise Attaque's self-titled debut album.

Louise Attaque was released in April 1997 to a positive critical response. Despite low initial radio airplay, the reputation of the group spread rapidly, garnering particular praise for its innovative violin-based folk/rock compositions and witty lyrics. Louise Attaque sold 2.5 million copies in France, a record for a French rock album.

It took almost three years until Louise Attaque's second album Comme On A Dit was released (in January 2000), again produced by Gordon Gano. The album sold 700,000 copies in France. In 2001, after touring for five months and appearing at various rock festivals, the band split up, explaining that they were temporarily out of inspiration and tired of the hype and pressure surrounding them.

=== From separation to reunion (2001-2005) ===
Louise Attaque split into two different groups in 2001. Singer Gaëtan Roussel and violinist Arnaud Samuel formed Tarmac, while bassist Robin Feix and drummer Alexandre Margraff formed Ali Dragon. The goal of Tarmac was to explore the starker sounds of acoustic instruments, while Ali Dragon produced underground experimental music featuring jam sessions (mostly electro and hip hop).

The four members of the group reunited in 2003. After recording for a few weeks in the Electric Lady Studios in New York, their third album, À Plus Tard Crocodile, was released in September 2005. The title references the rock and roll song "See You Later Alligator". À Plus Tard Crocodile was received as a departure from Louise Attaque's previous works, with lighter and more varied content.

== Awards ==
- 1999: Victoire de la musique in the category Band of the Year.
- 2001: Victoire de la musique in the category "Rock Album of the Year" for the album Comme on a dit.
- 2006: Victoire de la musique in the category "Pop/rock Album of the Year" for the album À Plus Tard Crocodile.

== Discography ==
=== Albums ===
Year	Album	Peak positions			Certifications
Year	Album	FR	BEL (Wa)	SWI	Certifications
1997	Louise Attaque	1	4	–	SNEP: 2× Gold
2000	Comme on a dit	1	1	10	
2005	À plus tard crocodile	2	2	7	
2016	Anomalie	3	4	8	SNEP: Gold
2022	Planète Terre	4	9	22	

Compilation albums

Year	Album	Peak positions		
Year	Album	FR	BEL (Wa)	SWI
2011	Du monde tout autour	6	4	91

=== Singles ===
Year	Single	Peak positions		Certifications	Album
Year	Single	FR	BEL (Wa)	Certifications	Album
1998	"Ton invitation"	10	14		Louise Attaque
2006	"Depuis toujours"	41	–		À plus tard crocodile
2011	"J't'emmène au vent"	72	–	SNEP: Diamond	Du monde tout autour
2015	"Anomalie"	111	–		Anomalie
