= Végétal =

Studio album by Émilie Simon
- Released: April 27, 2006
- Genre: Pop, trip hop, electronica
- Length: 50:09
- Label: Barclay

Émilie Simon chronology
La Marche de l'empereur (2005)	Végétal (2006)	The Flower Book (2006)

Alternative covers
- Japanese edition

Alternative cover
- Opendisc extras

Végétal is the second studio album by singer-songwriter Émilie Simon. Overall, it is her third album, the soundtrack to the French version of March of the Penguins included. The album has a floral theme running through it. All the lyrics relate to plants and there are also sounds taken from actual plants. The CD can be used in Émilie Simon's official website to access exclusive content such as bonus tracks, remixes, and a music video for "Fleur De Saison".

A special edition of the album was released in December 2006, featuring bonus tracks, remixes of "Fleur De Saison" and Opium, an exclusive short film on the making of the album and the video clip for "Fleur De Saison" on a bonus CD. So far, 5 editions of Végétal exists, each one different from each other through the inclusion of extras and bonuses.

The release was accompanied by the single "Fleur de Saison", which was released on 6 February 2006. The title means "Seasonal Flower" in English. It is from her second studio album Végétal. The music video for the song was directed by nObrain, that also directed the "Flowers" music video, and produced by COSA.

== Chart performance ==
In 2006, Végétal sold a total of 77,376 copies in France. She ranked 84th overall in the year-end French sales chart and 34th in the year-end download chart with 2,306 full album downloads.

== Track listing ==
1. "Alicia" - 3:56
2. "Fleur De Saison" - 4:10
3. "Le Vieil Amant" - 4:36
4. "Sweet Blossom" - 3:46
5. "Opium" - 2:50
6. "Dame De Lotus" - 3:23
7. "Swimming" - 4:10
8. "In the Lake" - 3:28
9. "Rose Hybride De Thé" - 3:16
10. "Never Fall In Love" - 2:54
11. "Annie" - 3:21
12. "My Old Friend" - 4:46
13. "En Cendres" - 5:24

=== Japanese bonus tracks ===
14. "Papillon" - 3:25
15. "Ferraille" - 2:44

=== Opendisc extras ===
- "Madeleine"
- "Ferraille"
- "Papillon"
- "Fleur de Saison" (JD and Jo remix)
- "Song of the Storm" (Ben Effect's remix)
- "Fleur de Saison" (Neïmo remix)
- "Fleur de Saison" (music video)
- "Dame de Lotus" (music video)
- Exclusive photos by Liza Roze

=== Super jewel box bonus CD ===
1. "Papillon"
2. "Ferraille"
3. "Au Lever Du Soir"
4. "Fleur De Saison" (Le Tigre remix)
5. "Fleur De Saison" (Neïmo flavoured mix)
6. "Opium" (Tom VDH remix)
7. "Opium" (Clocks remix)

== Charts ==
Chart (2006)	Peak Position
Belgian Albums (Ultratop Wallonia)	33
French Albums (SNEP)	11
Swiss Albums (Schweizer Hitparade)	44
