= Rock music in France =

French rock is a form of rock music produced in France, primarily with lyrics in the French language.

French rock was born as early as mid-1950s, when writer, songwriter and jazz player Boris Vian wrote parody rock songs for Magali Noël or Henri Salvador. Although Vian despised rock and wrote these songs as attacks, they are highly acclaimed by French critics today and considered precursors.

The first real French rock acts emerged in the late 1950s and early 1960s, with Johnny Hallyday achieving the most long-lasting success, while other acts like Les Chaussettes noires, led by other French rock star Eddy Mitchell, and Les Chats sauvages (led by Dick Rivers) contributed to the emergence of the genre, the last band writing the first real classic French rock song, Twist à Saint-Tropez. The emergence of the yé-yé movement slowed the commercial success of French rock, although some names like Antoine, Jacques Dutronc, Nino Ferrer and Michel Polnareff emerged in the middle of the 1960s and did have success, while others like Ronnie Bird or Les Variations (who are commonly considered forerunners of French hard rock) achieved cult status.

In the 1970s, France saw the arrival of rock bands such as Téléphone, and Alan Stivell's Breton folk-rock as well as a wave of progressive rock bands like Ange, Afterlife, Bottom Blues, Magma, Gong (whether they are actually a French band is debatable), Triangle, Dynastie Crisis, Shylock, Eskaton, Atoll and Pulsar. There was also some glam rock acts, like The Frenchies or the controversial and cult artist Alain Kan. Jacques Higelin's album BBH 75, which doesn't fit in these categories and is more of a transitional album between the classic era rock sound (à la Rolling Stones) and punk rock, is considered a seminal milestone by French critics, while ex-yé-yé star Christophe became a successful pop-rock artist, especially with his seminal albums Les Paradis perdus and Les Mots bleus (which title song is considered a major classic). French punk rock also appeared, including bands like Starshooter, Stinky Toys, Asphalt Jungle, Electric Callas, Oberkampf and Métal Urbain. It was during this period that variety music artists - like Catherine Ribeiro, Bernard Lavilliers and others - flirted with rock, but without completely changing over. However, French singer Serge Gainsbourg's 70s output, which included the classic Histoire de Melody Nelson, the less accessible L'Homme à tête de chou and the reggae Aux armes et cætera, transitioned completely from chanson to rock (a move he started earlier in the 1960s) and offered French-language rock new classics. Another name to know is that of Gérard Manset, a cult artist who deliberately live in maintained obscurity, but whose ballad Il voyage en solitaire is a major song and progressive album La Mort d'Orion is a reference, and who has continued to collaborate with high-profile artists up to this day. French hard rock and heavy metal took off by the end of the decade, spearheaded by Trust.

Things changed course in the 1980s with the arrival of the left in power. The notable changing of the political culture was accompanied by an explosion in youth culture. This helped the emergence of a distinct French rock that could match the lucrativeness of American and British rock music and bands. French progressive rock continued in the 1980s in relative obscurity, with the bands Dün, Minimum Vital, Terpandre and Emeraude achieving some underground success (but were met with critical indifference). The success of Téléphone (pub rock), which started in the 1970s but peaked in the 1980s, also took French rock to new levels. The new wave was dominated by Indochine, who sold enormously, as well as the romantic Alain Chamfort, overshadowing the works of critical darlings Taxi Girl or Jacno, but the genre also later saw the emergence of Étienne Daho, who would remain a major figure in French music up to this day. Another notable artist from the early 1980s is Axel Bauer, who scored a massive hit with the song Cargo. Charlélie Couture also marked its time with Comme un avion sans aile. The post-punk scene, although commercially unsuccessful, also featured critically acclaimed acts, such as Marquis de Sade, Hubert-Félix Thiéfaine, Orchestre rouge or Kas Product. The art rock band Les Rita Mitsouko enjoyed international success, while the decade also saw the emergence of Alain Bashung, who had been around since the 1960s but only started to have his first hits in the new wave era. Bashung would become the most critically acclaimed French rock singer in his home country, with several of his albums being now hailed as classics. There was also a second wave of French punk rock which included such acts as Lucrate Milk, Bérurier Noir, Ludwig Von 88, Les Shérifs, Les Négresses Vertes, Les Garçons Bouchers, Les Wampas, Les Satellites or the seminal Mano Negra, which would make the genre evolve towards worldbeat (and whose leader Manu Chao would later have a worldwide successful solo career). The first major French indie rock act appeared: Les Thugs, who are considered a major reference of the scene up to this day. Finally, French hard rock and heavy metal really took shape in this decade, with the continuing success of Trust or that of other bands like ADX, Warning, Shakin' Street, Sortilège or Vulcain, and some early thrash-death metal acts like Agressor, Loudblast or Morsüre.

The 1990s, still dominated by Bashung's aura and output (including Osez Joséphine and the major classic Fantaisie militaire), also saw the emergence of Noir Désir (their first classic album, Veuillez rendre l'âme (à qui elle appartient) dated back from the late 80s), whose sound fitted well in the grunge movement, and their 1992 album Tostaky was a huge popular and critical success, still selling solidly decades after its release. French rock was dominated by punk (No One Is Innocent), funk (-M-, FFF, Sinclair) and Noir Désir-soundalikes like Aston Villa or Saez (a trend which would continue in the 2000s with Luke, Eiffel or Déportivo, for instance). The very popular Louise Attaque refined the Noir Désir sound to fit a more indie folk approach, which would still allow them to achieve enormous sales. More on the indie scene, Diabologum and later its offshoots Expérience and Programme would become leaders, with a sound influenced by Pavement's approach. Other notable artists include Dominique A and Miossec who would sport a more minimalistic approach, pop bands Billy ze Kick et les Gamins en Folie, Les Innocents or L'Affaire Louis' Trio, and post-rock band Kat Onoma. Pop-rock artists Alain Souchon, Laurent Voulzy and Francis Cabrel, although they had been around since the 1970s, enjoyed major commercial success during this period. French heavy metal saw the emergence of the cult black metal scene of the Légions Noires with Vlad Tepes, Mütiilation, Belkètre or Torgeist and other acts not associated with it like Blut Aus Nord and Belenos, and some nu metal acts on the course of the decade, including Mass Hysteria, Lofofora, Eths or Pleymo.

The 2000s would see, alongside bands still influenced by Noir Désir, a dilution of the rock sound, with acts like Benjamin Biolay or Phoenix incorporating rock in their music, while being closer to chanson for the former (in a Dominique A-influenced approach) and French touch for the latter. Other chanson-affiliated artists flirting with rock include Jeanne Cherhal, Keren Ann, La Grande Sophie, Camille, Anaïs, Cali, Raphael, Bénabar and ex-Les Innocents leader J. P. Nataf, and artists more specifically influenced by Biolay include Florent Marchet, Arman Méliès, Bertrand Belin and Albin de la Simone. It also saw the reemergence of ex-new wave patriarchs Indochine as an emo-influenced band, with their album Paradize selling enormously and becoming a new classic. The decades-old French heavy metal would enjoy an international emergence, with acts like Gojira or AqME, while the underground black metal scene would keep on striving with bands like Deathspell Omega, Peste Noire or the more experimental Alcest. On the indie rock scene, Dionysos would become extremely popular with their hit Song for Jedi from their best-seller Western sous la neige, while other acts like A.S. Dragon or Ultra Orange would have more confidential success. Indie acts Yelle and M83 would achieve most of their success abroad. The second half of the decade would see the emergence of a French garage rock revival scene, with BB Brunes, Plastiscines, the Cheeraks, Crash Normal, the Normals, Naast, Izïa, Alister, Mademoiselle K or Stuck in the Sound.

In the 2010s, notable acts include the art rock/new wave outfit La Femme and Christine and the Queens, and electro-rock band Shaka Ponk also started to achieve major hits, alongside bands such as Skip The Use. Other notable acts include indie rock band Frànçois & the Atlas Mountains (who were active since 2005 but started to obtain critical acclaim this decade, although achieving most of their success abroad), Britpop-influenced Archimède, pop artist Arnaud Fleurent-Didier, art rock band Moodoïd, and Gnawa-inspired combo Bab L' Bluz. Following in the footsteps of their big brothers from the 70s, some militant and/or culturalist groups like Les Ramoneurs de Menhir and Matmatah also enjoyed great success, particularly in their region of origin, French Brittany.

== Singers and groups ==
In the following lists, artists and groups are classified by their decade of origin, even if their career spans multiple decades, or if they took time to become famous.

== 1950s ==
- Magali Noël
- Henri Salvador
- Mac Kac
- Chou Rave Hageur et ses Hot Dogs

Note: Magali Noël and Henri Salvador's output was parody.

== 1960s ==
- Les 5 Gentlemen
- Frank Alamo
- Richard Anthony
- Antoine
- Brigitte Bardot
- Alain Bashung
- Ronnie Bird
- Les Blousons noirs
- Georges Braudel
- Danny Boy et ses Pénitents
- Billy Bridge
- Les Chats sauvages
- Les Chaussettes noires
- Long Chris
- Christophe
- Clothilde
- Jean Bernard de Libreville
- Delphine
- Noël Deschamps
- Jacques Dutronc
- Nino Ferrer
- Les Fleurs de pavot
- Brigitte Fontaine
- Claude François
- Serge Gainsbourg
- France Gall
- Les Gam's
- Danyel Gérard
- Johnny Hallyday
- Françoise Hardy
- Anna Karina
- Herbert Léonard
- Charlotte Leslie
- Les Lionceaux
- Dany Logan et Les Pirates
- Gérard Manset
- Martin Circus
- Eddy Mitchell
- Monty
- Michel Paje
- Michel Polnareff
- Claude Puterflam
- Dick Rivers
- Sheila
- Yves Simon
- Les Sunlights
- Le Système Crapoutchik
- Jacqueline Taïeb
- Michèle Torr
- Stella Vander
- Les Variations
- Sylvie Vartan
- Pierre Vassiliu
- Dominique Walter
- Zoo
- Zouzou

== 1970s ==
=== Before punk ===
- Alpes (with Catherine Ribeiro)
- Ame Son
- Ange
- Alice
- Art Zoyd
- Atoll
- Au Bonheur des Dames
- Michel Berger
- Jane Birkin
- Bonneville
- Bottom Blues
- Emmanuel Booz
- Francis Cabrel
- Jean-Patrick Capdevielle
- Catharsis
- Alain Chamfort
- Chico Magnetic band
- Pascal Comelade
- Joël Daydé
- Bill Deraime
- Dynastie Crisis
- Ergo Sum
- Eskaton
- Etron Fou Leloublan
- Léo Ferré
- Fille Qui Mousse
- Forgas
- The Frenchies
- Gong
- Dashiell Hedayat (aka Jack-Alain Léger)
- Heldon
- Jacques Higelin
- Ilous & Decuyper
- René Joly
- Alain Kan
- Komintern
- Michel Kricorian
- Catherine Lara
- Lard Free
- Bernard Lavilliers
- Mahjun
- Magma
- Albert Marcœur
- Jean-Pierre Massiera
- Thierry Matioszek
- Mona Lisa
- Moving Gelatine Plates
- Odeurs
- Richard Pinhas
- Potemkine
- Présence
- Pulsar
- Red Noise
- Renaud
- Rhésus O
- Véronique Sanson
- William Sheller
- Shylock
- Alain Souchon
- Taï Phong
- Tangerine
- Mama Béa Tekielski
- Hubert-Félix Thiéfaine
- Trans Europe Express
- Triangle
- Volcania
- Verto
- Laurent Voulzy
- Wapassou
- ZNR
- Téléphone

=== After punk ===
- Asphalt Jungle
- Bijou
- Cyclope
- Dogs
- Edith Nylon
- Electric Callas
- Extraballe
- Jacno
- Little Bob
- Marie et les Garçons
- Marie France
- Marquis de Sade
- Métal Urbain
- Ocean
- Les Olivensteins
- Shakin' Street
- Starshooter
- Stinky Toys
- Strychnine
- Suicide Roméo
- Trust

== 1980s ==
- Les Ablettes
- ADX
- Agressor
- Attentat Rock
- Jean-Louis Aubert
- Les Avions
- Daniel Balavoine
- Banlieue Rouge
- Barbelés Cardiac
- Axel Bauer
- Louis Bertignac
- Bérurier Noir
- Blasphème
- Bernie Bonvoisin
- Buzy
- Café Noir
- Camera Silens
- Los Carayos
- Carte de séjour
- Chagrin d'amour
- Challenger
- Charles De Goal
- Chihuahua
- Coronados
- Patrick Coutin
- Charlélie Couture
- Étienne Daho
- Daniel Darc
- Elli et Jacno
- Louis Deprestige
- Gill Dougherty
- Patrick Eudeline
- Mylène Farmer
- Fisc
- Charlotte Gainsbourg
- Gamine
- Les Garçons Bouchers
- Gogol Premier
- Jean-Jacques Goldman
- H-Bomb
- High Power
- Hot Pants
- Indochine
- Jad Wio
- Kas Product
- Killers
- La Souris Déglinguée
- Marc Lavoine
- Lili Drop
- Lio
- Les Lolitas
- Loudblast
- Ludwig von 88
- Mano Negra
- Marc Seberg
- Corinne Marienneau
- Massacra
- Mathématiques modernes
- Elli Medeiros
- Modern Guy
- Morsüre
- Jean-Louis Murat
- Les Négresses Vertes
- Minimum Vital
- Niagara
- Noir Désir
- Norma Loy
- Oberkampf
- Orchestre rouge
- OTH
- Oui Oui
- Parabellum
- Vanessa Paradis
- Passion Fodder
- Paul Personne
- Les Playboys
- Raoul Petite
- Pigalle
- Les Porte Mentaux
- Presence
- Les Rita Mitsouko
- Rockin' Rebels
- Satan Jokers
- Les Satellites
- Les $heriff
- Sortilège
- Les Soucoupes violentes
- Squealer
- Stocks
- Taxi Girl
- Tear of a Doll
- Têtes Raides
- Les Thugs
- Tokow Boys
- Treponem Pal
- Tulaviok
- Tupelo Soul
- Arnold Turboust
- Les Valentins
- The Vietnam Veterans
- Les VRP
- Vulcain
- Les Wampas
- Warning
- Wild Child
- Wunderbach

== 1990s ==
- Dominique A
- L'Affaire Louis' Trio
- Air (French band)
- Anorexia Nervosa
- Antaeus
- Aston Villa
- Autour de Lucie
- Babylon Circus
- Belenos
- Belkètre
- Billy ze Kick et les Gamins en Folie
- Black Murder
- Blacklodge
- Blankass
- Blut Aus Nord
- Rodolphe Burger
- Burning Heads
- Calc
- Manu Chao
- Le Cri de la mouche
- Daisybox
- Daran et les chaises
- Diabologum
- Dionysos
- Dolly
- Doriand
- Eiffel
- Elend
- Elmer Food Beat
- Enhancer
- L'Esprit du clan
- Eths
- FFF
- Freedom for King Kong
- Gérald de Palmas
- Les Innocents
- Kat Onoma
- Philippe Katerine
- La Ruda first known as La Ruda Salska
- Lilicub
- Lofofora
- Louise Attaque
- Matthieu Chedid also known as simply -M-
- Marcel et son Orchestre
- The Married Monk
- Mass Hysteria
- Matmatah
- Mendelson
- Mercyless
- Merrimack
- Mickey 3D
- Miossec
- Mütiilation
- No One Is Innocent
- Nuit-blanches
- Les Ogres de Barback
- Osculum Infame
- Pleymo
- Portobello Bones
- Prohibition
- Pull
- Red Cardell
- Rinôçérôse
- La Rue Kétanou
- Saez
- Seth
- Silmarils
- Stormcore
- Svinkels
- Tagada Jones
- Rachid Taha
- Tanger
- Torgeist
- Ulan Bator
- Ultra Orange
- Uncommonmenfrommars
- Vlad Tepes
- Watcha
- Weepers Circus
- Welcome to Julian
- Yan et les Abeilles
- Zazie
- Zebda

== 2000s ==
- 10 Rue d'la Madeleine
- AaRON
- Albin de la Simone
- Alcest
- Alister
- Aluk Todolo
- Anaïs
- Keren Ann
- AqME
- Arkhon Infaustus
- Asyl
- A.S. Dragon
- BB Brunes
- Bertrand Belin
- Bénabar
- Benighted
- Benjamin Biolay
- Black Bomb A
- Black Rain
- The Black Noodle Project
- The Blueberries
- Boxon
- Bukowski
- Café Bertrand
- Cali
- Calogero
- Camille
- The Cheeraks
- Jeanne Cherhal
- Crash Normal
- Dahlia
- Deathspell Omega
- Debout Sur Le Zinc
- Déportivo
- devianz
- Eiffel
- Expérience
- Frànçois & the Atlas Mountains
- Freedom For King Kong
- Frustration
- Gojira
- La Grande Sophie
- Hacride
- HushPuppies
- Ipecacuana
- Izïa
- K
- Kaolin
- Kyo
- The Little Rabbits
- Les Fatals Picards
- Lex Riders
- The Limiñanas
- Renan Luce
- Luke
- M83
- Mademoiselle K
- The Magnetix
- Florent Marchet
- Arman Méliès
- Hubert Mounier
- Music Is Not Fun
- Mustang
- Naast
- J. P. Nataf
- Nosfell
- Nouvelle Vague
- Nude
- Pep's
- Peste Noire
- Phoenix
- Plastiscines
- Pony Pony Run Run
- Programme
- Prototypes
- Quidam
- Olivia Ruiz
- Raphael
- Revolver
- Sexy Sushi
- Shades
- Shaka Ponk
- The Shapers
- Sidilarsen
- Spektr
- Stuck In The Sound
- Stupeflip
- Subway
- Superbus
- Tahiti 80
- Tarmac
- Temple of Baal
- Ultra Vomit
- Vanity Case
- Vegastar
- Wäks
- Wünjo
- Yelle

== 2010s ==
- Jeanne Added
- Aldaaron
- Archimède
- Bab L' Bluz
- Bazar et Bémols
- Brigitte
- Caravaggio
- Détroit
- La Femme
- Forever Pavot
- Fuzzy Vox
- Grand Blanc
- Granville
- Éric Lareine & Leurs Enfants
- Lescop
- Mademoiselle K
- Mars Red Sky
- Melody's Echo Chamber
- Minuit
- Moodoïd
- Les Sans Culottes
- Sutcliffe
- We Were Evergreen
- Woodkid
