= Musilac Music Festival =

Annual music festival in France

Coordinates: 45.7000°N 5.8853°E

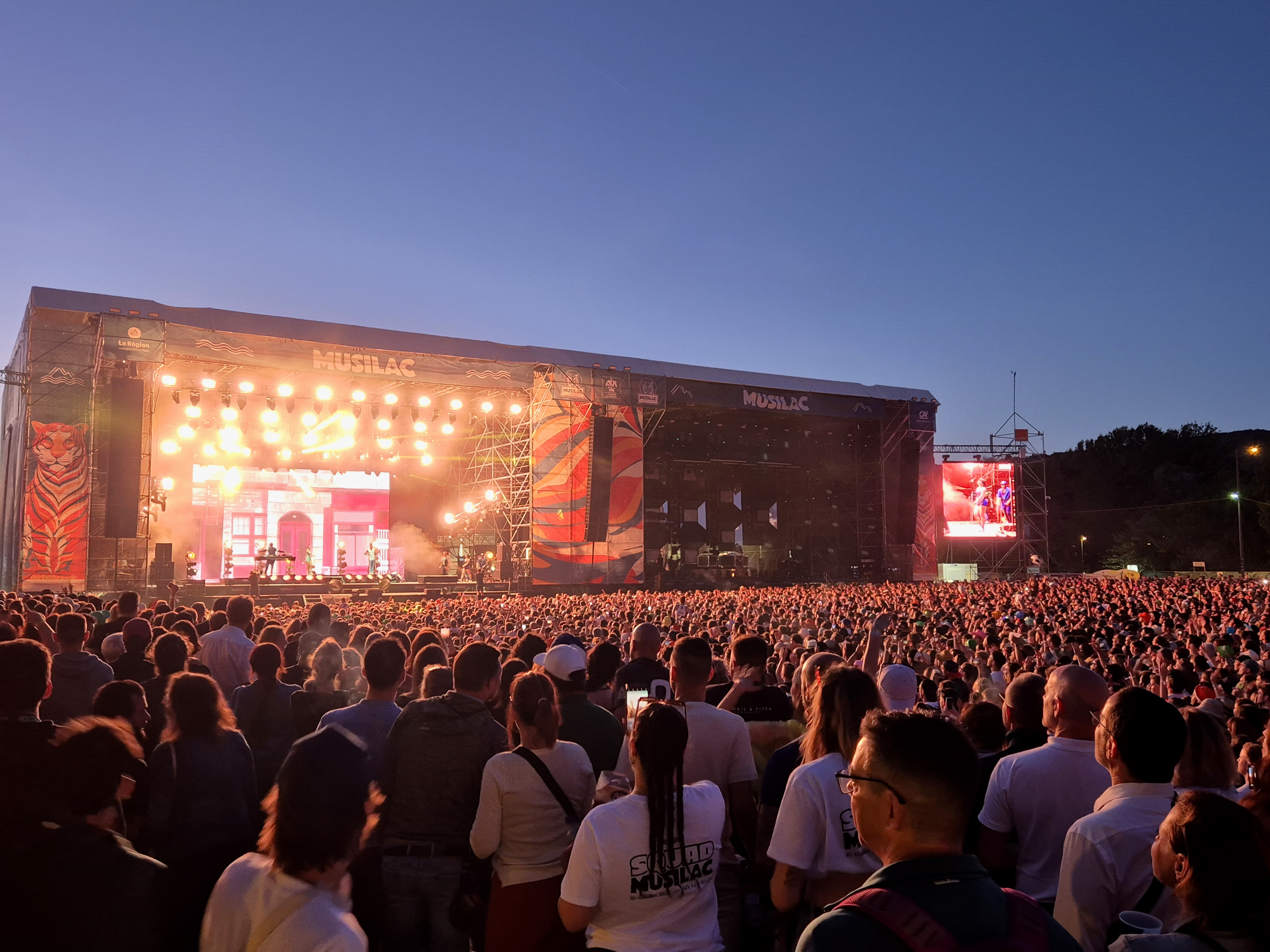
- Genre: Punk rock, alternative rock, reggae, hip hop, pop
- Dates: First 2 weeks of July
- Locations: Aix-les-Bains, France
- Years active: 2002 to present
- Founders: Rémi Pérrier and Roland Zennaro
- Website: www.musilac.com

Musilac is a French music festival. It occurs in Aix-les-Bains, France every year since 2002. It lasts between two and four days, in mid-July, at the Esplanade of the Lac du Bourget.

The festival's attendance has steadily increased, with about 75,000 spectators in 2012, compared to 15,000 in 2003. The festival includes multiple genres of music, rather than a specific genre.

One of the aims of this festival is to help young local talent get wider publicity.

== Location ==
The festival takes place in Aix-les-Bains (France) on the Lac du Bourget.

== Program ==
The program was developed to reflect both its French origins and a wide range of international influence.

July 2012:

- Friday 13th: The Lanskies, Alabama Shakes, Miossec, Bat for Lashes, Dionysos, Bénabar, The Kills, Jean-Louis Aubert, The Specials
- Saturday 14th: Olivier Depardon, Le Scop, Fanfarlo, Band of Skulls, Orelsan, Metronomy, Franz Ferdinand, Lenny Kravitz, Shaka Ponk, Don Rimini
- Sunday 15th: Daguerre, Zulu Winter, Moriarty, Skip the Use, LMFAO, Blink 182, Le Peuple de l’Herbe, Yuksek

July 2011:

- Thursday 14th: Santana, Aṣa, Mogwai, Angus & Julia Stone, Morcheeba, Bernard Lavilliers, Ben l'Oncle Soul, Bloody Beetroots, Scissor Sisters, The Ting Tings
- Friday 15th: The Chemical Brothers, Aaron, Nouvelle Vague, Gaëtan Roussel, Katerine, Eels, Deus, PJ Harvey, Lilly Wood & The Prick, Concrete Knives
- Saturday 16th: Ben Harper, Kasabian, Mademoiselle K, Cali, Puggy, Vitalic, Cocoon, The Two, Selah Sue, Lull

July 2010:

- Friday 16th: ZZ Top, -M-, Pete Doherty, Gogol Bordello, BB Brunes, Pony Pony Run Run, Newton Faulkner, Gush, PMS Better
- Saturday 17th: Mika, Renan Luce, Paul Weller, Seasick Steve, Rodrigo y Gabriela, Joseph Leon, Zak Laughed, Feloche, Settled In Motion
- Sunday 18th: Indochine, Coeur de Pirate, Phoenix, Wax Tailor, White Lies, Luke, The Maccabees, Stolen Sweet Hearts

July 2009:

- Friday 10th: Bénabar, The Pretenders, Keziah Jones, Anis, Cocoon, Sinsemilia, Caravan Palace, BP Zoom, Yodelice, Jolga
- Saturday 11th: Camille, The Prodigy, The Gossip, Birdy Nam Nam, Justin Nozuka, Ghinzu, Les Wampas, Bombay Bicycle Club, Sophie Delila, Lady Kill
- Sunday 12th: Franz Ferdinand, Duffy, Olivia Ruiz, Charlie Winston, The Dodoz, Zaza Fournier, John and Jehn, The Kooks, Coming Soon, Raz'Rockette

July 2008:

- Friday 11th: Patti Smith, Vanessa Paradis, Babyshambles, Arno, Daniel Darc, Pauline Croze, Hocus Pocus, Aṣa, The Dodoz et Trompe le Monde
- Saturday 12th: Mika, Yael Naim, Thomas Dutronc, The Dø, BB Brunes, Pep's, Yelle, Ben's Brother, Laetitia Shériff, The Virgins
- Sunday 13th: Têtes Raides, The John Butler Trio, Catherine Ringer sings Les Rita Mitsouko, Hubert-Félix Thiéfaine & Paul Personne, Editors, KT Tunstall, The Wombats, Zebramix, Empyr, Nicolas Fraissinet

July 2007:

- Thursday 12th: Placebo, Mademoiselle K
- Friday 13th: Muse, Razorlight, Ayọ, Frank Black, Da Silva, The Blood Arm
- Saturday 14th: Zazie, Renaud, Tryo, Rose, Adrienne Pauly, Aldebert, Elista, Mano Solo
- Sunday 15th: Arctic Monkeys, Archive, Keane, Tété, Superbus, Abd al Malik, Sean Lennon

July 2006:

- Friday 7th: Texas, Cali, Simple Minds, Starsailor, Dionysos, Anaïs, La Grande Sophie
- Saturday 8th: Bernard Lavilliers, Toots and the Maytals, Diam's, Dub Incorporation, Laurent Garnier, Bugge Wesseltoft, Bumcello, Rhesus, Jehro
- Sunday 9th: Louise Attaque, Émilie Simon, Thomas Fersen, Hubert-Félix Thiéfaine, CirKus feat. Neneh Cherry, Patrice Bart-Williams, Balbino Medellin

July 2005:

- Friday 15th: Sinsemilia, Les Ogres de Barback, Les Fils de Teuhpu, La Ruda
- Saturday 16th: Iggy Pop & The Stooges, Ghinzu, Sinclair, Saez, The Servant, The Herbaliser
- Sunday 17th: Franz Ferdinand, Luke, Kaolin, Le Peuple de l'Herbe, Mickey 3D, Grand National, Rubin Steiner

July 2004:

- Friday 2nd: Peter Gabriel, Scissor Sisters, Air
- Saturday 3rd: -M-, Cali
- Sunday 4th: The Cure

And also Placebo, Sanseverino

July 2003:

- Friday 4th: Jean-Louis Aubert
- Saturday 5th: Venus
- Sunday 6th: Renaud, Camille, La Tordue

And also Morcheeba, Dionysos and Ska-P

July 2002:

- Friday 5th: Indochine
- Saturday 6th: Noir Désir, Superbus

== Music styles ==
One of the key characteristics of Musilac is the great diversity of music styles. This have included in past years:

- Rock

Rock and roll, acoustic, alternative rock, art rock, Britpop, blues rock, experimental rock, French rock, folk rock, funk rock, garage rock, glam rock, gothic rock, hard rock, indie rock, jam rock, post-Britpop, progressive rock, pop rock, psychedelia, punk rock, roots rock, space rock, steady and symphonic rock.

- Metal

Heavy metal and power metal.

- Pop

Baroque pop, dream pop, indie pop, power pop, synthpop, trip, twee and wonky pop.

- Electro

Electronic, electronica, electroclash, electro swing and electro house.

- Others

2 tone, acoustic music, Afrobeat, ambient, American folk, anti-folk, alternative dance, big beat, boogie, breakbeat hardcore, bluegrass, blues, blue-eyed soul, chill-out, country, dance, dance-punk, dancehall, dub, downtempo, experimental, folk, folktronica, French hip hop, funk, gospel, gypsy punk, hardcore, hip hop, hip hop soul, hip house, indie folk, jazz, jazz rap, jam, lo-fi, new wave, neofolk, neo-psychedelia, neo soul, nu-disco, post-punk, post-punk revival, protopunk, psychobilly, reggae, rhythm and blues, ska punk, soul, Yoruba and world music.

== Partnerships ==
The Musilac festival has a large number of partnerships from different sectors and industries. The three main sponsors of the event are Aix-les-Bain Tourism, Savoie Conseil Général and the Crédit Mutuel. They also have other important partnerships with media brands such as Virgin Radio (French Radio Channel), Direct Star (French Digital Channel), the local newspaper le Dauphiné and a specialized magazine Rock & Folk. They also have what they call their official sponsors such as Teisseire a French syrup company, Kronenbourg the best selling beer in France, Fnac a French international retail chain selling cultural and electronic products, the Haute-Savoie county council and the guitar game Rocksmith. The festival also made partnerships with local businesses such as Chartreuse, Jean Lain automobile, Tercinet Audition, the Aix-Les-Bains shopkeepers association, the local bus organization Ondea, Internationales Moquettes and Airstar, Install’ service, CALB, Marina Adelphia. In addition to these local partnerships, there are also major corporate partnerships such as Coca-Cola, Pathé Cinema, Point.P, Monoprix, INPES.

Musilac also supports the human rights organization Amnesty and French charity Laurette Fugain. The latter encourages people to donate their blood-platelets for people affected by leukemia. Mrs Stéphanie Fugain, the charity's president, sponsored the event in 2009 as guest of honor. The festival is a key place for their campaign as a lot of young people attend.

== Cost and finance ==
The price to access to the festival in 2012 and 2013 is the same. The following tickets options are available:

- Tickets are cheaper the earlier you buy them: the Pass Confidance (3 days access) costs €69, there is only a fix number of this tickets available..
- Then, the Pass Promo (3 days access) costs €89 and when it's sold out, the normal pass for the 3 days will cost €119.
- There is also the possibility to buy a one-day pass for €49.
- For the camping access, the price is €5 per night, so €15 for the 3 days.

Musilac is a private SARL, but is helped by the tourism office of Aix-les-Bains by more than 400 €000 every year. The benefits for the SARL is around 400 €000. In comparison, the estimated benefits for the local shops is around 10 €000.

== Attendance ==
Average number of spectators each year :

Musilac Attendance

- 2003: 15 000 spectators
- 2004: 20 000 spectators
- 2005: 33 000 spectators
- 2006: 40 000 spectators
- 2007: 60 000 spectators
- 2008: 60 000 spectators
- 2009: 62 000 spectators
- 2010: 72 000 spectators
- 2011: 82 000 spectators
- 2012: 75 000 spectators

In terms of attendance Musilac Festival is ranked as the eighth most popular festival in France, with an average of 46 000 spectators over the past nine years. This festival is less important than festivals like Vieilles Charrues Festival which attracted in 2011 more than 270 000 spectators or Great Britain's biggest festival, the Glastonbury Festival which reached nearly 1 million spectators in 2012.

== Accommodation ==
The Musilac Festival occurs over a three-day period; thus, sleeping areas are provided by the festival. There are currently two campsites: Lamartine and Bognette are associated with the event and located near by as now people prefer to camp than be in a hotel. Aix-les-Bains also has a wide range of hotel and campings offers close to the site.

== Food and drinks ==
Aix-les-Bains offers many bars and restoration areas providing food, snacks and drinks. Camping and hotels can also offer meals to their customers. The Musilac Festival itself also means 25 restaurants, two wine bars, a juice bar and five snack shops.

== Ecology ==
Big events such as Musilac often end up with a large amount of garbage such as plastic cups covering the area, bottles, etc. The festival has thus created two projects allowing them to be ecological friendly. To avoid waste of cups, they are given to spectators with a one euro caution fee, that will be then given back when it is returned. By being partners with Ecocup, the festival then recycles all the cups giving them a second life as beach ash trays or even car accessories. Musilac also offers a recycling garden put in place with their partner Coca-Cola, where in exchange of plastic bottles they offer gifts created from bottle recycling, and then reuse the plastic to create garden furniture for Musilac.

== See also ==
Musilac was ranked the 8th best French music festival in 2011 by “ZePASS le Mag”, an online music magazine. The other top three festivals in 2011 were: Les Vieilles Charrues Festival as best French festival; Le Printemps de Bourges as second best; and, Les Francofolies de La Rochelle, who hosted more than 170,000 spectators. Other festivals across Europe also attract large numbers of visitors. For example: Oxegen Festival in Ireland where you could listen to Rihanna perform (2011 program); the Glastonbury Festival where Beyoncé Knowles performed (2011 program); and the most diversified festival who proposes not only music but also dancing and acting or V Festival where you can listen to Eminem (2011 program) in the United Kingdom, Rock Werchter has been voted more than once best rock festival in the world and Pukkelpop in Belgium, Roskilde Festival in Denmark, EXIT in Serbia held in a medieval fort, Sziget Festival in Hongria is one of the festival with the most concerts (600 in 5 days), Coke Live Music Festival in Poland and Oya Festival in Norway, The Paléo Festival in Swiss the second biggest European summer festival.
