= Les Satellites =

French alternative rock band

- Origin: Paris
- Genres: Alternative rock
- Years active: 1985–1994
- Labels: Sony Music
- Members: Pierre "Polo" Lamy; Roro; Arnold; Mr Miel; Jef; Sabine; Poulpe
- Website: http://polo.a.paris.free.fr

Les Satellites (The Satellites) is a French alternative rock band that was formed in 1985 and split up in 1994.

== History ==
The band was born in late 1985 on the ashes of underground acts Tonton est mort and Abject. They play a mix of 60's influenced rock and funk with the addition of brass instruments. The lyrics are resolutely humoristic and careless. In 1986, they started touring with then popular alternative French bands Bérurier Noir, Ludwig von 88, Les Wampas and Mano Negra and played on stage dressed as cosmonauts. They gained an important success with their second album Riches et célèbres (Rich and famous) that allowed them to play in some of Paris's biggest concert halls such as the Olympia hall.

Reggae influences appear on the third album Pied Orange (Orange foot) and a 4 tracks EP is recorded in 1993 with the raggamuffin artist Saï Saï. The musicians decide to disband in 1994 after the promotion tour for the fourth album "4". Singer Polo started a solo career.

== Band members ==
- Polo (lead vocals)
- Roro (drums)
- Arnold (guitars)
- Mr Miel (bass)
- Jef (trombone, backing vocals)
- Sabine (backing vocals)
- Poulpe (trumpet)

== Similar bands ==
- Bérurier Noir
- Les Cadavres
- Les Rats
- Les Sheriff
- Los Carayos
- OTH
- Parabellum

== Discography ==
- Du Grouve Et Des Souris (1987)
- Riches Et Célèbres (1989)
- Pied Orange (1990)
- 4 (1993)
- Les Satellites capturent Saï-Saï (1993) 4 tracks EP
