= Ra-Ta-Ta =

Ra-Ta-Ta or Ra-Ta-Ta-Ta may refer to:

- Ra Ta Ta, a 2023 single album by Ailee
- "Ra-Ta-Ta" (Chris Juwens song), a 1970 German song by pianist Chris Juwens and Christian Heilburg
- "Ra ta ta", a 2024 song by Mahmood
- "Ra-Ta-Ta" (World Saxophone Quartet song), a song by the World Saxophone Quartet from the 1979 album Steppin' with the World Saxophone Quartet
- "Ra-Ta Ta-Ta" (Anna Abreu song), a song by Finnish singer Anna Abreu from the 2014 album V

== See also ==
- "Ta-Ra-Ta-Ta", a song by Italian singer Mina from the 1966 album Studio Uno 66
- Ta-ra-ra Boom-de-ay
- Ratata (disambiguation)
