= Deportivo =

Deportivo (Spanish, 'sporting') may refer to:

- Deportivo de La Coruña, commonly known as simply Deportivo, a Spanish football club
- Déportivo, a French rock band
- Deportivo (Mexicable), an aerial lift station in Ecatepec, Mexico
- Deportivo station, in San Juan agglomeration, Puerto Rico
