= Ratata =

Ratata may refer to:

- Ratata (band), a Swedish pop band and Ratata, their eponymous debut
- Ratata, a 1990 album by Belgian singer Arno
- "Ratata", a song from the 2023 Indian film Leo
- The Swedish name for the cartoon dog Rantanplan

== See also ==
- Ra-Ta-Ta (disambiguation)
- Rattata
- Ratatal
- Ratatat
- Ratatata, a song by Japanese kawaii metal band Babymetal and German electronicore band Electric Callboy, released in 2025
- "Rah Tah Tah", a song by Tyler, the Creator from Chromakopia, released in 2024
