= Au Bonheur des Dames (band) =

French rock band

Au Bonheur des Dames was a French rock band from the 1970s led by Ramon Pipin. Its name is likely inspired from the title of the classic novel Au Bonheur des Dames of Émile Zola. The band is very notable for their song Oh les filles that reached the Top 10 in France, which appears on their debut album, Twist, released in 1974. The group had performed its first concert in January 1972, at the Golf-Drouot. In 1977, they performed at the first edition of the now well known music Festival Le Printemps de Bourges. More or less separated since 1987, the group is making a comeback in 1997 with two concerts at the Olympia, which result in the release of a new album (live). New return in 2006 with a concert at the Grand Rex on October 19.

== Discography ==
1974 : Twist
1975 : Coucou maman
1976 : Halte là!
1987 : Jour de fête
1997 : Les adieux (en concert)
2006 : Métal moumoute
2017 : #placeauxjeunes
