= Devianz =

French rock band

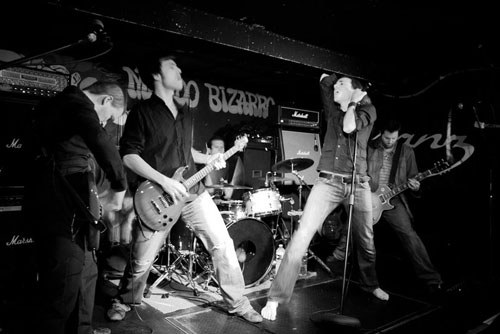
- Devianz in Rennes in 2009

Background information
- Origin: Paris, France
- Genres: Power rock, grunge, indie rock
- Years active: 2004–present
- Members: Guyom Pavesi: vocals Benoît Blin: guitars Pierre Labarbe: guitars Vincent Rémon: bass guitar
- Website: https://www.facebook.com/devianz

Devianz is a French rock band founded in 2004.

== History ==
- September 2004: creation of Devianz by Guyom Pavesi, Maxime Decitre and Benoît Blin.
- April 2005: the band enters the LB Lab studio with Stéphane Buriez (Loudblast).
- December 2005: release of the first album Una Duna in Mezzo All’Oceano.
- End of 2006: the Eleganz video clip is broadcast on some cable channels (Nolife...).
- 2007: back to the studio for the recording of an EP Les Lèvres Assassines , recorded by Davy Portela (Pleymo).
- April 2009: first French tour with Aesthesia.
- July 2009/February 2010: recording of the second album.
- January 2010: announcement of the participation of Vincent Cavanagh from Anathema on vocals and arrangements on a track of the new album.
- April 2010: exclusive broadcasting on Ouï FM of a track from the forthcoming album.
- May 2012: release of the second album À Corps Interrompus.

== Line-up ==
=== Current members ===
- Guyom Pavesi: vocals since 2004
- Benoît Blin: guitars since 2004
- Pierre Labarbe: guitars since 2006
- Vincent Rémon: bass guitar since 2007

=== Past members ===
- Maxime Decitre: drums from 2004 to 2008 and 2014
- Emmanuel Mechling: bass guitar from 2004 to 2006
- Nicolas Robache: bass guitar from 2006 to 2007
- Nicolas Pytel: drums from 2008 to 2011
- Charles-Vincent Lefèvre: drums from 2011 to 2012
- Thibault Faucher: drums from 2012 to 2014

== Discography ==
=== Una Duna In Mezzo All'Oceano ===
- Release date: November 21, 2005
- Track list:
1. Quatre Longs Matins
2. El Silencio Es Muerto
3. Innocente Petite Chose
4. Odalisque 1
5. Eleganz
6. Décembres Naïfs
7. Des Parallèles
8. Solstice Du Premier Âge
9. Odalisque 2
10. Тринадцать
11. Épistophane
12. Bitter Landscape/Simple De Jade
- Additional information: recorded and mixed by Stéphane Buriez (Loudblast) at the LB Lab studio, mastered byr Jean-Pierre Bouquet at the Autre Studio.

=== Les Lèvres Assassines ===
- Release date: May 31, 2008
- Track list:
1. 040506
2. Vos Enfants Sont Aussi Des Animaux
3. Innocente Petite Chose
4. Cœur D'Odalisque
5. Vivre Ou Survivre (Daniel Balavoine cover)/Backdoor Killer (hidden track)

+ videoclip Eleganz

- Additional information: recorded, mixed and mastered by Davy Portela (Pleymo) at the Midilive, Nowhere, Daniel and Sriracha studios. Videoclip directed by Jean-Philippe Astoux.

=== Trouble Amante ===
- Release date: December 19, 2011
- Track list:
1. Trouble Amante
2. J'en Appelle Au Silence
3. L'Alchimie Des Sens
4. Shout (Tears For Fears cover) (downloadable bonus track)
- Additional information: Recorded and mixed by Guyom Pavesi, mastered by Alan Douches.

=== À Corps Interrompus ===
- Release date: May 14, 2012
- Track list:
1. Happiness In Frustration
2. Des Racines Dans La Chair
3. Soleil D'Encre
4. Sous Une Lune De Plomb
5. L'Instant Suspendu
6. L'Alchimie Des Sens
7. Mute Echo Room
8. Douze De Mes Phalanges
9. Ton Corps N'Est Qu'Atome (featuring Vincent Cavanagh from Anathema)
10. Trouble Amante
11. Lames De Sel
12. Arpeggio
13. Passion/Omission
14. En Attendant L'Aube (bonus track on the physical edition)
- Additional information: Recorded and mixed by Guyom Pavesi, mastered by Alan Douches.

== Media ==
- The "Eleganz" videoclip has been broadcast on some cable channels (Nolife...).
- Devianz recorded the soundtrack of the short movie Le Gendre directed by Eric Sicot with the track Backdoor Killer.
- On April 29, 2009, Devianz has been mentioned as a musical reference by the deputy Patrick Roy for the music downloading debate at the Assemblée Nationale.
- Devianz recorded the soundtrack of the short movie - NYC- directed by Seb Houis with a cover of "Shout" by Tears For Fears.
- On April 11, 2010, the track "Soleil D'Encre" from the forthcoming second album is exclusively broadcast on Ouï FM.
- On June 24, 2012, the track "L'Alchimie Des Sens" appears on the new Broken Balls magazine compilation: Broken Balls Fanzine – Compil No. 6.
