= The Strands of the Future =

Studio album by Pulsar
- Released: 21 September 1976
- Recorded: January, February 1976
- Studio: Aquarius Studios, Geneva, Switzerland
- Genre: Progressive rock, symphonic rock, space rock
- Length: 43:49
- Label: Kingdom Records

Pulsar chronology
| Pollen (1975) | The Strands of the Future (1976) | Halloween (1977) |

The Strands of the Future is the second album by French progressive rock band Pulsar. The first half of the album consists of the title track, with extensive use of the mellotron, and the second half being a collection of shorter songs. The lyrics to the songs are written in both French and English, with the title track lyrics being in French.

== Track listing ==
Side one
| No. | Title | Length |
|---|---|---|
| 1. | "The Strands of the Future" | 22:08 |

Side two
| No. | Title | Length |
|---|---|---|
| 2. | "Flight" | 2:37 |
| 3. | "Windows" | 8:47 |
| 4. | "Fool's Failure" | 10:17 |

== Personnel ==
- Victor Bosch - drums, percussion
- Gilbert Gandil - guitars, vocals
- Roland Richard - flute, strings
- Jacques Roman - organ, mellotron, bass, synthesizers
