= Atoll (band) =

French progressive rock band

- Origin: Metz, France
- Genres: Progressive rock
- Years active: 1972–1981; 1985–present (Chris Beya Atoll); 2013–2015 (André Balzer's Atoll)
- Label: Eurodisc
- Spinoffs: Chris Beya Atoll; André Balzer's Atoll
- Members: Chris Beya; Didier Hoffmann; Mike Kadi; Jo Coimbra; Alain Chéry
- Past members: Luc Serra; Jean-Luc Thillot; Alain Gozzo; André Balzer; Francis Paul; Michel Taillet; Patrick Kiffer; Jean-Claude Monnet; Bruno Géhin; Richard Aubert; Raoul Leininger; Jean-Pierre Klares; Gilles Bonnabaud; Nathalie Geschir

Atoll is a French progressive rock band formed in Metz in 1972 and active until 1981. Different iterations of the group have since coalesced around prominent members, including Chris Beya and André Balzer.

In the 1970s, they were ranked among the top progressive rock groups in France, along with Ange, Magma, Triangle, and Martin Circus, and they toured both at home and internationally.

== History ==
=== First phase: 1972–1981 ===
Guitarists Luc Serra and Jean-Luc Thillot as well as drummer Alain Gozzo, all three from the northeastern French city of Metz, met in 1972 and decided to form a band. With the addition of vocalist André "Dédé" Balzer and bassist Francis Paul, the original lineup of Atoll came together.

After the release of two singles on Eurodisc, the band underwent a few personnel changes: Michel Taillet joined the group on keyboards and percussion, and Francis Paul was replaced by Patrick Kiffer, who was himself replaced on bass by Thillot shortly after. In 1974, Atoll published their debut album, Musiciens magiciens. At the end of the year, Balzer left and Serra took over on vocals, though he also departed the group before long. The band then took on vocalist and guitarist Jean-Claude Monnet, second keyboardist Bruno Géhin, and violinist Richard Aubert.

In January 1975, Balzer rejoined Atoll on vocals, and in March, Monnet left; he was replaced by Chris Beya on guitar. The band had been working on their second studio album, titled L'Araignée-Mal, and they released it at the end of the year. Géhin departed the group in July, and Aubert took over on keyboards. In 1976, Gozzo left and was replaced by Didier Hoffmann, though Gozzo eventually rejoined. Aubert also departed the group that year. At the end of 1976 and after having issued two albums, Atoll's lineup, consisting of Jean-Luc Thillot on bass, Alain Gozzo on drums, André Balzer on vocals, Michel Taillet on keyboards, and Chris Beya on guitar, remained stable until the band's 1981 breakup.

Atoll's third studio album, Tertio, came out in 1977 and included guest vocals by Stella Vander and Lisa Deluxe from Magma. The group promoted its release with a concert at Fête de l'Humanité in September 1978. They followed up a year later with the release of Rock Puzzle. The album was reissued in 1993 with six bonus tracks, three of which featured John Wetton (King Crimson) on bass and vocals. One of these tracks, "Here Comes the Feeling", written by Wetton, was rearranged and appeared on the 1982 debut, self-titled album by Wetton's band Asia.

In 1981, while they had begun to work on new material, members of Atoll gradually drifted away from the group, beginning with Thillot and Balzer, but not before releasing the compilation album Cosmic Trips.

At the beginning of 2018, the Japanese record label Marquee approached Beya with the idea of organizing a concert with as many original Atoll members as possible. This led to a reunion with André Balzer as well as Didier Hoffmann. They were joined by Mike Kadi on vocals and flute, Jo Coimbra on bass, and Alain Chéry on keyboards. On 18 July 2018, Atoll performed in Tokyo with Mario Millo's band.

=== Subsequent iterations ===
Chris Beya Atoll

In 1985, Chris Beya recorded the instrumental composition "Métamorphose" for the Musea Records album Enchantement, which also included music by Ange and Pulsar, among others. This led to Beya reforming Atoll, with him as the sole member of its final, 1981 lineup, in addition to Raoul Leininger on vocals, Jean-Pierre Klares on bass, Gilles Bonnabaud on drums, and Nathalie Geschir on keyboards. In 1989, the band released its first new record since 1981, titled L'océan, followed by the live album Tokyo, c'est fini! in 1990.

In 2003, the album Illian – J'entends gronder la terre, was released under the name Chris Beya Atoll. In 2014, Beya, accompanied by Mike Kadi on vocals and Didier Hoffmann on drums, released an English version of the album, titled I Hear the Earth.

André Balzer's Atoll

From 2013 to 2015, André Balzer, together with a backing band, performed reimagined versions of Atoll songs live, under the name André Balzer's Atoll.

== Band members ==
Current

- Chris Beya – guitar
- Didier Hoffmann – drums
- Mike Kadi – vocals, flute
- Jo Coimbra – bass
- Alain Chéry – keyboards

Past

- Luc Serra – guitar, vocals
- Jean-Luc Thillot – guitar, bass
- Alain Gozzo – drums
- André Balzer – vocals
- Francis Paul – bass
- Michel Taillet – keyboards
- Patrick Kiffer – bass
- Jean-Claude Monnet – vocals, guitar
- Bruno Géhin – keyboards
- Richard Aubert – violin, keyboards
- Raoul Leininger – vocals
- Jean-Pierre Klares – bass
- Gilles Bonnabaud – drums
- Nathalie Geschir – keyboards

== Discography ==
- Musiciens Magiciens (1974)
- L'Araignée-Mal (1975)
- Tertio (1977)
- Rock Puzzle (1979)
- Cosmic Trips (compilation, 1981)
- L'Océan (1989)
- Tokyo, C'est Fini (live, 1990)
- Illian – J'entends Gronder La Terre (2003)
- I Hear the Earth (2014)
