= Temple of Baal (band) =

French black metal band

Temple of Baal is a French black metal band.

For the band's third album, Lightslaying Rituals, they signed with Agonia Records.

== Discography ==
=== Studio albums ===
- Servants of the Beast (2003)
- Traitors to Mankind (2005)
- Lightslaying Rituals (2009)
- Verses of Fire (2013)
- Mysterium (2015)

=== Splits ===
- Unholy Chants of Darkness / Faces of the Void with Eternal Majesty (2001)
- Split with Sargeist (2004)
- Split with Ancestral Fog (2006)
- Split with Aosoth (2007)
- The Vision of Fading Mankind with Ritualization (2011)
- Split with VI and The Order of Apollyon (2017)
