= Ratatal =

- village
- Location within Madhya Pradesh Location within India
- Coordinates: 23.383823°N 77.3611549°E
- Country: India
- State: Madhya Pradesh
- District: Bhopal
- Tehsil: Huzur
- Elevation: 499 m (1,637 ft)

Population (2011)
  - Total: 806
- Time zone: UTC+5:30 (IST)
- ISO 3166 code: MP-IN
- 2011 census code: 482383

Ratatal is a village in the Bhopal district of Madhya Pradesh, India. It is located in the Huzur tehsil and the Phanda block.

== Demographics ==
According to the 2011 census of India, Ratatal has 150 households. The effective literacy rate (i.e. the literacy rate of population excluding children aged 6 and below) is 67.3%.

Demographics (2011 Census)
	Total	Male	Female
Population	806	433	373
Children aged below 6 years	121	67	54
Scheduled caste	115	57	58
Scheduled tribe	29	15	14
Literates	461	282	179
Workers (all)	464	259	205
Main workers (total)	223	202	21
Main workers: Cultivators	141	138	3
Main workers: Agricultural labourers	3	2	1
Main workers: Household industry workers	6	6	0
Main workers: Other	73	56	17
Marginal workers (total)	241	57	184
Marginal workers: Cultivators	135	12	123
Marginal workers: Agricultural labourers	103	43	60
Marginal workers: Household industry workers	1	0	1
Marginal workers: Others	2	2	0
Non-workers	342	174	168
