= Pulsar (band) =

French progressive rock band

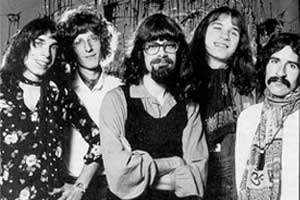
- Pulsar in 1976 (from left to right): Michel Masson, Roland Richard, Gilbert Gandil, Victor Bosch, Jacques Roman

Background information
- Origin: Lyon, France
- Genres: Progressive rock, space rock, psychedelic rock
- Years active: 1974–present
- Labels: (United States) CBS (France) Musea, Cypress Music
- Past members: Philippe Roman (1970–1974); Michel Masson (1975–1978)
- Website: youtube.com/thepulsarband myspace.com/thepulsarband

Pulsar is a French progressive rock band whose influences include Pink Floyd and King Crimson, plus classical musicians and composers such as Gustav Mahler.

During the early 1980s, the group performed and composed the music for a Franco‑Austrian musical theatre production. Their most recent album is Memory Ashes (2007).

== History ==
Pulsar is the first French band to have signed with an English label, which was called "Kingdom Records".

The band recorded and published its first album, Pollen, in 1975. Philipe Roman left the band shortly after. The following year, the group recruited bassist Michel Masson, who later collaborated with them on The Strands of the Future (1976) and Halloween (1977).

In the early eighties, together with director Bruno Carlucci, in musical theatre, Pulsar adapted a short story by Austrian novelist Peter Handke: "Bienvenue au Conseil D'Administration!" (1981). The quintet comprised Gilbert Gandil on guitar and bass, Victor Bosch at the drums, Jacques Roman on keyboard, and Roland Richard playing the flute and saxophone, along with Louis Paralis taking the place of Michel Masson.

From 1974 to 1989, their albums were produced by CBS. Later, they were produced by Musea, a French label which had bought the distribution rights. The band launched a comeback in 1989, publishing Görlitz.

The group's most recent album is Memory Ashes (2007), produced by Cypress Music. In 2008, Goldmine Magazine listed Halloween among the top 25 albums of progressive rock.

In 2013, Jacques Roman and Gilbert Gandil released the album Way to Lhassa band with the band Siiilk.

== Band members ==
(1970–1974)	Jacques Roman – synthesizer, keyboard, mellotron; Victor Bosch – drums, percussion; Gilbert Gandil – guitar, lead vocals; Roland Richard – piano, flute; Philippe Roman – bass, vocals, composition
(1975–1980)	Jacques Roman – synthesizer, keyboard, mellotron; Victor Bosch – drums, percussion; Gilbert Gandil – guitar, lead vocals; Roland Richard – piano, flute; Michel Masson – bass
(1981–present)	Jacques Roman – synthesizer, keyboard, mellotron; Victor Bosch – drums, percussion; Gilbert Gandil – guitar, lead vocals; Roland Richard – piano, flute; Louis Paralis – bass

== Discography ==
- 1975: Pollen
- 1976: The Strands of the Future
- 1977: Halloween
- 1981: Bienvenue au Conseil d'Administration
- 1989: Görlitz
- 2007: Memory Ashes

== Authorship ==
The introduction of the album Halloween, credited as one of the band's compositions, is the traditional Irish tune "Londonderry Air".
