= L'Affaire Louis' Trio =

French art pop band

L'Affaire Louis' Trio (L'ALT for short) were an art pop band from Lyon, France. The band formed in 1982, and in 1986 were signed to Barclay records, France, who released their first album, Chic planète. The members were: singer / guitarist Cleet Boris (aka Hubert Mounier, who died in May 2016), guitarist Karl Niagara (aka Vincent Mounier, Hubert's younger brother), and keyboardist / drummer Bronco Junior (aka François Lebleu, who died in December 2008). In 1987, L'Affaire Louis' Trio were awarded the prize for best newcomers at France's Victoires de la Musique ceremony.

The trio stayed together until 1997, when Vincent Mounier left during the recording of their 1997 release, Europium. The band split up after the release of the album, but Hubert Mounier recorded with drummer Lebleu on his first two solo releases, Le Grand Huit (2001) and Voyager léger (2005). He had also worked extensively as a comic book artist under his Cleet Boris pseudonym. He died of an aortic dissection on 2 May 2016 at the age of 53.

== Style ==
The band's sound was defined by large scale, jazz-influenced arrangements by composer Pierre Adenot, the angular pop of English band XTC, and the pop-funk exotica of New York City-based Kid Creole and the Coconuts. Their initial recordings relied heavily on contributions from some of France's top jazz musicians, however, the band's sound was continually refined over the years, with Europium (1997), their last album, offering their most stripped down, guitar-centric arrangements.

== Lyrics ==
Hubert Mounier's lyrics are often witty, containing a large amount of wordplay and puns. His most lyrically ambitious project was L'Affaire Louis' Trio's fourth album, Mobilis in mobile (1993) a concept album based on the character of Captain Nemo, from Jules Verne's 1870 novel Twenty Thousand Leagues Under the Seas.

== Collaborations ==
L'ALT worked with notable musicians and videomakers, including XTC bassist Colin Moulding on L'Homme aux mille vies (1995) and Michel Gondry on the video for "Il y a ceux" (1989). The lush, romantic arrangements for their first five albums were provided by Pierre Adenot, while Benjamin Biolay took over arranging duties for their final record.

== Discography ==
The band had several chart successes with singles like "Tout mais pas ça", "Chic Planète" and "Mobilis in Mobile", which entered the French Top 40 during the 1980s and 1990s; it also enjoyed some success in Québec.

Studio albums:

- Chic planète (1987)
- Le Retour de L'âge d'or (1988)
- Sans légende (1990)
- Mobilis in mobile (1993)
- L'Homme aux mille vies (1995)
- L'Affaire Louis Trio or Europium (1997)

Compilation :

- Le Meilleur de l'Affaire (1998)
