= Mademoiselle K =

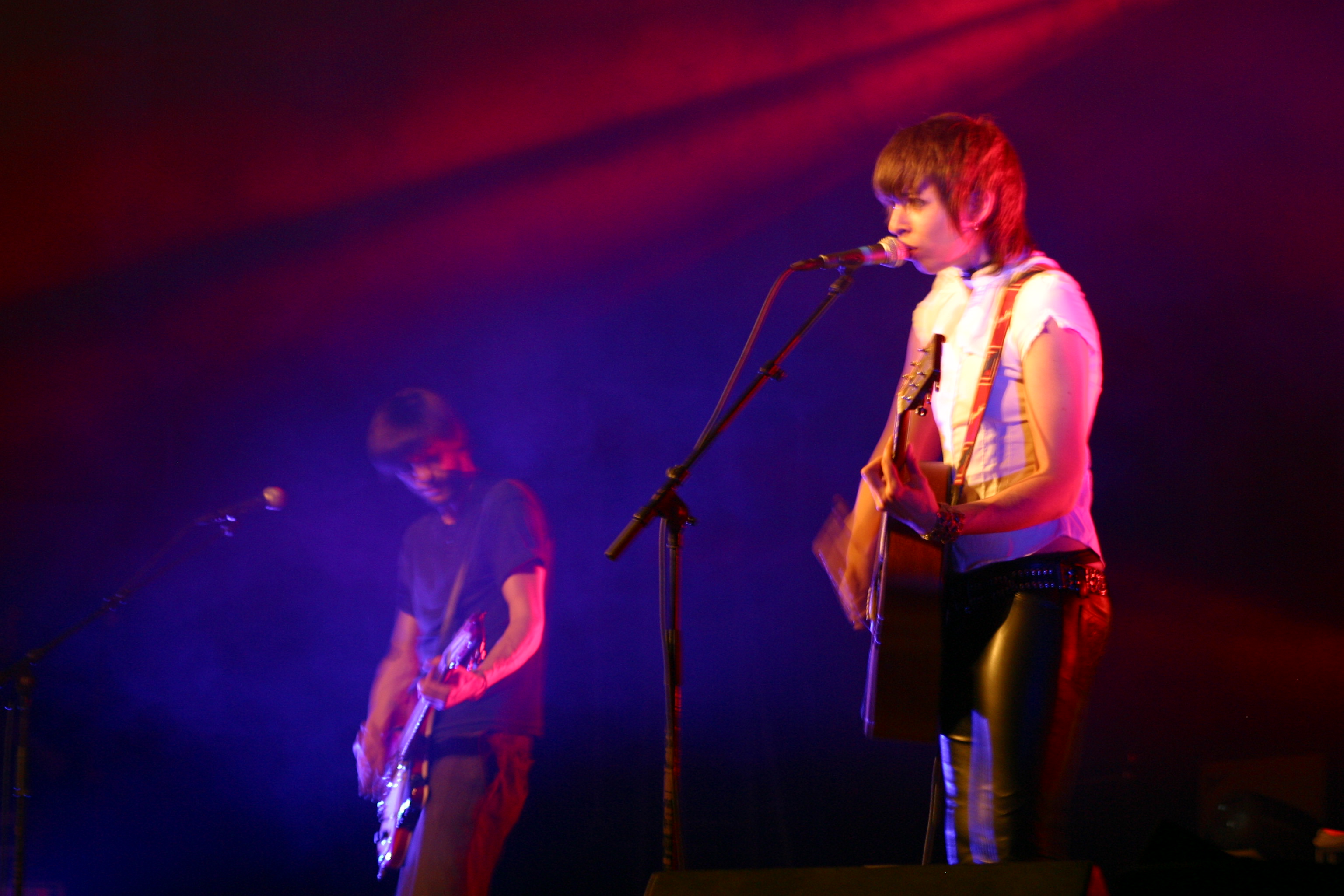
- Mademoiselle K in 2007

Background information
- Origin: France
- Labels: EMI International
- Website: www.mademoisellek.fr

Mademoiselle K is a four-person French rock band currently signed with EMI, as of July 2007. The band takes its name from its leader, Katerine Gierak, and so the K is for Katerine.

== Career ==
At age four she had decided to take music as her only path when she saw a guitarist in the Bois de Boulogne in Paris. Her mother then signed her up for early music classes when she was five years old. She said in an interview that she had wanted to learn the piano, but since she and her family could not afford one and also didn't have the room for a piano, she instead learned the recorder.

At about the same time she had also started studying music including scales, rests and other music theory. In her school she had met a music teacher of the name Annick Chatreux. According to Mademoiselle K, Annick explained to her that there are no barriers between music based on genres, and that music was simply music. This advice helped Mademoiselle K to be open to all types of music including jazz, classical etc.

For her general culture exam in school, she had listened to CDs of different genres. At that time, she had also started performing live as a guitarist but not a singer. She had even started writing lyrics but she didn't set them to music straight away.

She had received her first guitar at age of 8 and she's been playing guitar ever since. She had even won a prize in classical guitar.

After she finished her secondary school, she chose musicology and started to compose her lyrics and also started to sing. At this time she was trying to qualify as a teacher. But she failed her exam and so at this time Mademoiselle K was determined to make it into music. At this time she wrote the song Ca sent l'Eté which came to be included in her first studio album Ça me Vexe.

After failing her exam, she started meeting musicians, playing for 50 Euro a night and sometimes for free. She had even started taking singing lessons and bought herself her first guitar, a Fender Telecaster. She had started writing more and more songs and put them in demos.

She was unclear at first about the combination of Rock music and French language, but seeing -M- performing during her adolescent years, she was convinced that there was nothing wrong with the combination.

She also took part in the French Kiss tour 2007 which was held in India to celebrate World Music Day. The event started on 20 June and continued for a week until 27 June. The event was spread across nine Indian cities including Chandigarh, Pune, Kolkata, New Delhi, Mumbai, Hyderabad, Chennai, Thiruvananthapuram and Bangalore. Along with her were French artists Anais Croze and Emily Loizeau.

== Discography ==
=== Albums ===
Album	Year	Peak positions	Certifications	Notes
Album	Year	FRA	Certifications	Notes
Ça me vexe: Release date: 28 August 2006; Record label: EMI International	2006	44		Track list: 1. Reste là 2. Ça sent l'été 3. Ça me vexe 4. Le Cul entre deux chaises 5. Crève; 6. Grimper tout là-haut 7. Jalouse; 8. Fringue par fringue 9. À L'Ombre; 10. À côté 11. Plus le cœur à ça 12. Final
Jamais la paix: Release date: 23 May 2008; Record label: Delabel	2008	12		Track list: 1. Le vent la fureur 2. ASD; 3. Jamais la paix 4. Maman XY; 5. Grave; 6. Pas des carrés 7. En smoking 8. Click clock 9. Tea Time; 10. Alors je dessine 11. Enjoliveur; 12. Espace
Jouer Dehors: Release date: 14 January 2011; Record label: Roy / Delabel	2011	20		Track list: 1. Aisément; 2. Branc; 3. Jouer Dehors; 4. La Corde; 5. Que Toi; 6. Vade Retro; 7. Toujours Imparfait; 8. Laurene Lhorizon; 9. Me Taire Te Plaire; 10. Sioux; 11. T'es mort?; 12. Solidaires; 13. A L'infini
Hungry Dirty Baby: Release date: 19 January 2015; Record label: Kravache	2015	46		Track list: 1. I Can Ride a F****d Up Bull; 2. Glory; 3. R U Swimming?; 4. Explicit; 5. Love Robots; 6. LAAA LA; 7. Walk of Shame; 8. Ur Wow; 9. Watch Me; 10. Someday; 11. Morning Song; 12. C la Mort (Bonus track)
Sous les brûlures l'incandescence intacte: Release date: 1 September 2017; Record label: Kravache	2017	24		Track list: 1. Bonjour bonjour 2. Sick; 3. On s'est laissé 4. J'ai pleuré 5. Sous les brûlures 6. Pour aller mieux 7. Ça ne sera pas moi 8. Hypnotisés vers la lumière 9. Suckin' My Brain; 10. We're Kissing Baïe Baïe
Mademoiselle K: Release date: 14 October 2022; Record label: Kravache	2022			Track list: 1. Chloroforme; 2. Nos intensités 3. Garçon bleu 4. Vercors Hardcore; 5. Les trains 6. Gâché; 7. J'rêve d'un CRS; 8. Gratin de tendresse 9. Sous mon pull 10. Ta sueur 11. Trafiquante de crêtes

Box albums

- 2011: Jamais la paix / Ça me vexe [EMI]

Live albums

Album	Year	Peak positions	Certifications	Notes
Album	Year	FRA	Certifications	Notes
Live 2009: Release date: 5 October 2009; Record label: Delabel	2009	79		

=== Singles ===
Year	Single	Peak positions	Certifications	Album
Year	Single	FRA	Certifications	Album
2012	"Ça me vexe"	82		Ça me vexe
2014	"Jalouse"	189		
