= Billy Ze Kick =

French rock band

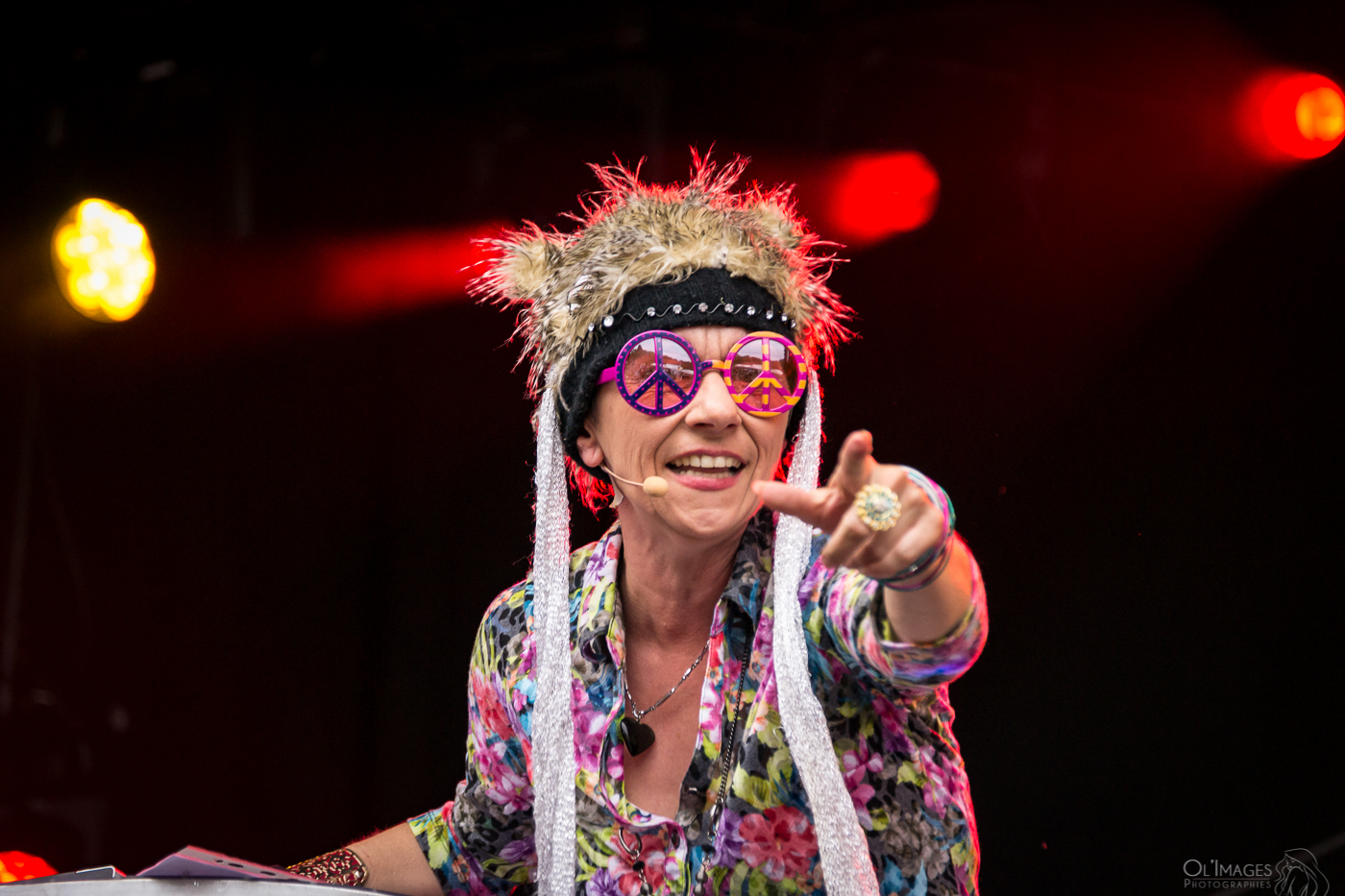
Billy Ze Kick at ParkRock Festival 2015

Billy Ze Kick were a French alternative rock band formed in 1990. Formed as Billy Ze Kick Et Les Gamins En Folie, they split in 1994 after only one album. The singer, Nathalie Cousin, continued with a solo album under the abbreviation BZK. They reunited in 2000, releasing a new album on the next year, and remaining active as of the end of 2006. The name of the band is probably taken from the title of a book by Jean Vautrin, later adapted in to a film on 1985).

The music itself usually involves the repeating of a catchy refrain with melodic rap on top, with influences on electronic rock and reggae. The band's biggest hit, Mangez Moi (Eat Me), is about psychedelic mushrooms. OCB was another of the band's hits, about the rolling papers made by that brand. The endgame video clip in the game MDK is their cover of the Les Poppys song Non Non Rien N'a Changé (No No Nothing Has Changed).

== Discography ==
- Billy Ze Kick et Les Gamins en Folie (1994)
- Paniac (1996)
- Verdure et libido (2001)
- Premiers titres (2003)
