= Ronnie Bird =

French rock music singer

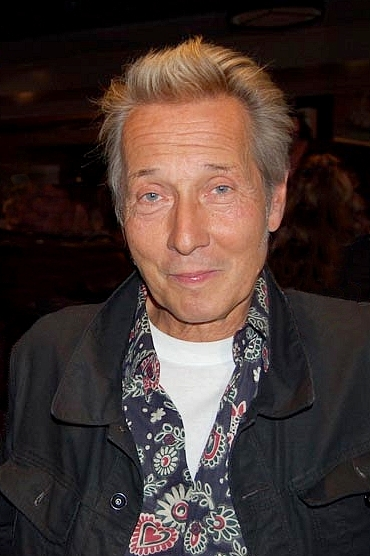
- Ronnie Bird at Rock'n'roll jubilee, Paris 2010

Background information
- Born: Ronald Méhu; 24 April 1946 (age 80); Boulogne-Billancourt, Hauts-de-Seine, France
- Genre: Rock
- Occupations: Singer, songwriter
- Years active: since 1964
- Labels: Decca; Philips, Phonogram, Mercury

Ronnie Bird (born Ronald Méhu; 24 April 1946 in Boulogne-Billancourt, Hauts-de-Seine) is a French singer.

== Career ==
As a student, Bird attended Lycée Claude-Bernard in Paris until he had an argument with a teacher.

As a young singer, he preferred to perform in French in a desire for authenticity. He debuted his recording career in 1964 with Decca, with the title track Adieu à un ami, which was a homage to Buddy Holly; this song later appeared in the film US Go Home (1994). According to author Jonathyne Briggs, Bird and other French pop stars of that era, such as Jacques Dutronc, Hugues Aufray, Antoine, and Serge Gainsbourg "created a more diverse pop music landscape". Richie Unterberger later wrote, "During the mid-'60s, Ronnie Bird was the only French artist to successfully emulate the sounds of the British Invasion across the channel".

He was voted the eighth most popular male singer in France in a 1965 poll by Salut Les Copains. He hosted a Radio Luxembourg 208 broadcast on 1 April 1966.

He regularly appeared with popular singers visiting France, including Chuck Berry and Tom Jones.

He recorded the Rolling Stones' "The Last Time" and "Down Home Girl" in French. He recorded songs by Mickey Jones and Tommy Brown in English for Philips. He recorded two songs, "Rain on the City" and "Sad Soul" for the U.S. market before his U.S. tour.

Bird appeared with many other artists in the "photo du siècle" or "photo of the century" taken by Jean-Marie Périer. The photograph published in the magazine Salut les copains in 1966.

Despite his evident ability and the apparent success of songs like Elle m'attend, Où va-t-elle ?, Bird ended his artistic career after 5 years.

He is also noted for participating in the French production of the musical Hair between 1968 and 1972 . Moreover, he wrote the lyrics of the song, Precious Things, sung by Dee Dee Bridgewater, in a duet with Ray Charles, which saw success in 1989.

The song Le Pivert (the woodpecker) was prohibited from being played on Radio-France because of, according to an internal memo, its "vulgar attack on good taste". The memo was published in Charlie Hebdo.

== Discography ==
=== Super 45 tours, singles, CD singles ===
- 1964 : Adieu à un ami / Tu ferais mieux de filer / On s'aime en secret / Dis aux montagnes (Decca)
- 1964 : L'amour nous rend fou / Pour toi / Je ne mens pas / Tout seul (Decca)
- 1965 : Elle m'attend / Tu perds ton temps / Fais attention / Pour être à toi (Decca)
- 1965 : Où va-t-elle ? / Ma vie s'enfuit / Je voudrais dire / Ce maudit journal (Decca)
- 1966 : Chante / Ne t'en fais pas pour Ronnie / Cette maudite solitude / Cheese (Philips)
- 1966 : N'écoute pas ton cœur / Seul dans la nuit / Hey girl ! / Ça n'est pas vrai (Philips)
- 1967 : Tu en dis trop / C'est un hold-up / Je serre les poings / Tu ne sais pas (Philips)
- 1967 : La surprise / Si quelque chose m'arrivait / Les filles en sucre d'orge / Ne promets rien (Philips)
- 1967 : Le pivert / De l'autre côté du miroir / SOS mesdemoiselles / Aimez-moi (Philips)
- 1969 : Sad soul / Rain in the city (Philips)
- 1992 : One world (version courte) / One world (version longue) / Jazz it up (Philips)
- 1995 : Live 65 & 67 : Route 66 / Fais attention / C'est un hold-up / Fa fa fa fa fa (Sad song) (LCD)

=== Original studio albums ===
- 1965 : Ronnie Bird (LP Decca 154134) (France) (réédition 2010 LP Universal 134154S) (regroupe les EP 1,2,3 : Elle M'Attend / Je Ne Mens Pas / Pour Toi / Tu Perds Ton Temps / Dis Aux Montagnes / On S'Aime En Secret / Fais Attention / L'Amour Nous Rend Fous / Adieu A Un Ami / Tout Seul / Pour Être A Toi / Tu Ferais Mieux De Filer)
- 1966 : Ronnie Bird (LP London MLP 10062) (Canada) (version canadienne du précédent, 4 titres remplacés par ceux du EP 4 : Où Va-T-Elle ? / Ma Vie S'enfuit / Je Voudrais Dire / Ce Maudit Journal / Tu Perds Ton Temps / On S'aime En Secret / Pour Toi / Je Ne Mens Pas / Fais Attention / L'amour Nous Rend Fous / Tu Ferais Mieux De Filer / Elle M'Attend)
- 1967 : Ronnie Bird (LP Philips 70452) (Canada) (réédition 2008 LP Mercury 5309083) (France) (regroupe les EP 5,6,7 : N'Écoute Pas Ton Cœur / Seul Dans La Nuit / Hey Girl! / Ce N'Est Pas Vrai / Chante / Ne T'En Fais Pas Pour Ronnie / Je Serre Les Poings / Tu Ne Sais Pas / Tu En Dis Trop / C'Est Un Hold-Up / Cette Maudite Solitude / Cheese)
- 1992 : One World (CD Philips 512292–2) (France) (One World / Jazz It Up / A Dollar A Dance / Russian Cruise / Jungle / Make My Day / Tango / Don't Disturb / Go Ronnie Go / Sister Don't - (Ronnie Bird / Leslie Winston))

=== Collaborations ===
- 2016 : Ronnie Bird & M. Mader : The Demos (CD Loon Music) (Beau fixe / Elle est si belle / Si seulement / Elle en a vu / Pêle-mêle / Le beau Gégé / J'suis à court / Tu frappes ta mère / J'ai envie de toi / Respire - (Ronnie Bird / Mader))
- 2017 : Himiko : Nebula (CD Assai Records)

=== Live albums ===
- 1983 : En public (LP Eva 12025) (France)

=== Compilations albums ===
- 1976 : 63-66 (LP Decca 278 145)
- 1984 : Le style anglais (LP Philips 818986–1)
- 1985 : 1965 (LP ou CD Big Beat Records 70342)
- 1990 : Fais attention (LP ou CD Club Dial 900.048.1)
- 1990 : N'écoute pas ton cœur (LP ou CD Club Dial 900.057.1)
- 1990 : Le rock c'est ça ! (CD Polygram Distribution 842 055–2)
- 2002 : Twistin' the rock vol. 7 (2xCD Mercury France 586495–2)(+)
- 2006 : EP & singles collection 1964-1969 (coffret 9 CD EP + 2 CD SP Magic Records)(+)
- 2009 : Tendres Années 60 (CD Mercury 530 604–7)
- 2015 : Salut les copains (2xCD Mercury)(+)

=== As writer ===
- 1992 : "Someone to lead me" (Ronnie Bird / FR David) - (SP Pense A Moi) by F.R. David.
- 1989 : "Precious thing" (Ronnie Bird / Pierre Papadiamandis) - (SP Polydor) by Dee Dee Bridgewater & Ray Charles.
- 1996 : CD Strong love affair: Say no more (Ronnie Bird / Pierre Papadiamandis) - (CD Qwest) by Ray Charles.
- 1988 : CD Haunted: Haunted, Memorial, King for a day (Ronnie Bird / Bernard Paganotti) - (CD Bleu Citron) by Paga Group (avec Bernard Paganotti).
- 1993 : CD Gnosis: Caravan (Ronnie Bird / Bernard Paganotti) - (CD Bleu Citron) by Paga Group (avec Bernard Paganotti).

=== Miscellaneous ===
- 2003 : François Jouffa – Pop Culture: Interviews & Reportages 1964-1970: Ronnie Bird - 10/10/65 - (CD Frémeaux & Associés)
- 2014 : En Direct ! (LP Jukebox Magazine JBM 027) (Route 66 / Je Ne Mens Pas / Elle M'attend / Tu Perds Ton Temps / Fais Attention / I Can't Stand It / Chante / Fa Fa Fa Fa Fa Fa (Sad Song) / C'est Un Hold-Up / I Will Love You)

== See also ==
- Photo_du_siècle
