= Ludwig von 88 =

French punk rock band

- Origin: Paris
- Genres: Punk rock, alternative rock, comedy rock, pop
- Years active: 1983–1999, 2016–present
- Website: ludwigvon88.free.fr

Ludwig von 88 is a French punk rock and Comedy rock band mostly active in the 1980s and 1990s, celebrated in the French underground scene. In 2019, the band released their first album in a decade, and have continued to remain active, releasing a further four albums in 2023 to celebrate their 40th anniversary. Their music is similar to that of influent French punks Bérurier Noir (both bands were initially signed with the Bondage Records indie rock label): two-fingered and distorted guitar chords, over a drum machine, with reggae influences. Their lyrics range from nonsensical and often juvenile humour to social and political commentary.

The band had different line-ups, but in the late 80s featured Karim Berrouka on vocals, Nobru on guitar, Laurent and then Charlu on bass, and Jean-Mi on programming. Past members include Olaf, Gondrax (François Gondry, bass player) and Laurent Manet.

== Discography ==
=== Albums ===
- Houlala 1986
- Houlala II "la mission" 1987
- Ce jour heureux est plein d'allégresse 1990
- Tout pour le trash 1992
- 17 plombs pour péter les tubes 1994
- Prophètes et Nains de jardin 1996
- Houlala III "l'heureux tour" live, 1998
- La révolution n'est pas un dîner de gala 2001
- 20 chansons optimistes pour en finir avec le futur 2019
- L'hiver des crêtes 2023
- Le printemps du pogo 2023
- L'été du no future 2023
- L'automne de l'anarchie (Quarante ans de punk approximatif - Saison 4) 2024

=== Singles, 45 rpms, EPs ===
- "Live?" 1985
- "Les trois petits keupons" 1987
- "Louison Bobet for ever" 1987
- "Guerrier Balubas" 1988
- "Sprint" 1988
- "Sardellen Filet" 1989
- "L.S.D. for Ethiopie (We Are The World)" 1990
- "New Orleans" 1991
- "In the Ghettos" 1993
- "TAMERANTONG" 1993
- "Hiroshima (50 ans d'inconscience)" 1995
- "Le crépuscule des fourbes" 1996
- "La sacrée grole" 1997
- "Ludwig von 88", live 1997
- "St-Valentin" 1998

=== Compilation albums ===
- De l'âge du trash à l'âge du zen 2004
- De l'âge de la crête à l'âge du bronze 2004
