= Ra-Ta-Ta (Chris Juwens song) =

Song

"Ra-Ta-Ta", or "Ra Ta-Ta-Ta" is a 1970 German song written by Hamburg pianist Chris Juwens (real name Uwe Stelzmann; 1946-1998) and Christian Heilburg (real name Gregor Rottschalk, 01/12/1945). Gunter Gabriel of CBS Records Germany heard the song's catchy potential right away, but his boss dissuaded him. Nevertheless, the song swept across Europe with singles in many other European languages. The first single release was the English version by German band Rotation in June 1970. In the US, it was promoted there as a result of the top 10 success of singer Antoine's French version in Paris.

== Versions ==
- "Ra Ta Ta", German studio band Rotation, with English lyrics by Gregor Rottschalk (1970)
- "Ra-Ta-Ta", Antoine; Juwens, Heilburg, French lyrics by Similie, Delancray (1970)
- "Ra Ta-Ta-Ta", The Lollipops; Danish lyrics (1970)
- "Ra-Ta-Ta", James Last Orchestra; instrumental (1970)
- "Ra Ta Ta", Klaas & Peter (nl:Klaas Leyen, nl:Peter Schoonhoven) in Dutch (1970)
- "Ra Ta Ta Ta Ta", de:Andy Fisher; Juwens, German lyrics by C. Heilburg (1970)
- "Ra-Ta-Ta", Gregor Rottschalk; Germany (1970)
- "Ra-ta-ta", Globetrotters; Germany
- "Ra-Ta-Ta", Los Javaloyas; C. Juwens, C. Heilburg, Spanish lyrics by M. Clavero (1971)
- "Ra-Ta-Ta", Fredi; Chris Juwens, Finnish lyrics by Georg Dolivo (1971)
- "Ra-Ta-Ta-Ta", da:Johnny Reimar; Juwens, Heilburg, Danish lyrics by Viggo Happel (1971)
- "Ra-Ta-Ta-Ta-Ta", Dizzie Tunes, Norwegian lyrics by Yngvar Numme (1971)
- "Ra-Ta-Ta", Scotch Mist (Pilot) (1974)
