= Alain Kan =

- Born: Alain Michel Zisa; 14 September 1944; Paris, France
- Disappeared: 14 April 1990 (aged 45); Rue de la Pompe metro station
- Status: Missing for 36 years, 3 months and 19 days
- Occupations: Singer, songwriter
- Musical career
- Genres: Glam rock; psychedelic rock
- Years active: 1963–1990

Alain Kan (born Alain Michel Zisa; 14 September 1944), is a French singer who disappeared on 14 April 1990.

== Early life ==
Born Alain Michel Zisa in Paris, France, on 14 September 1944. Kan was raised by his mother and stepfather, and grew up with his stepsister Véronique, seven years older than him. "Kan" is the surname of his stepfather, Kan never knew his biological father.

== Music career ==
In the spring of 1963, at the age of 16, Kan released his first 45 rpm at Pathé-Marconi, "Si l'amore" (written by Bob du Pac and Jean-Louis Chauby) on the A-side, and "Quand tu reviendras" (written by Michel Jourdan and Danyel Gérard) on the B-side. The following year, in 1964, he released three 4-track EPs from Decca, mostly consisting of covers of American and Canadian singers, including Paul Anka.

=== Glam rock period ===
In the 1970s, Kan travelled to London, England, where he developed an interest in the music of Lou Reed, T. Rex, and David Bowie, who would go on to be an enormous influence on him, and he met Marie France. Inspired by the glam rock music of these musicians, Kan made a foray into glam rock with the album "Et Gary Cooper s'éloigna dans le désert..." (1975), followed by "Heureusement en France on ne se drogue pas" (1976). While recording the latter at the Château d'Hérouville, in Hérouville-en-Vexin, Val-d'Oise, he met David Bowie. Kan said of this meeting: "In Hérouville, I met Bowie, who took me away for ten days in his black Mercedes. Since then I have not missed my discoloration ... There have been lots of photos in the press and since then there has been a kind of respect for me".

== Disappearance ==
Alain Kan disappeared on 14 April 1990. He was last seen at the Rue de la Pompe Parisian metro station.

== Personal life ==
In 1971, Alain Kan became the brother-in-law of singer Christophe, when Christophe married Kan's sister, Véronique.

== See also ==
- List of people who disappeared mysteriously (1990s)

== Discography ==
- Et Gary Cooper S'Éloigna Dans Le Désert... (1975)
- Heureusement En France, On Ne Se Drogue Pas... (1976)
- What Ever Happened To Alain Z. Kan (1979)
- Parfums De Nuit... (1986)

== Compilations ==
- Alain Kan13 Coffret 3 CD – 2007

== EP ==
- Tu le sais14 EP – 1964
- Pour mon anniversaire15 EP – 1964
- Paris sous la pluie16 EP – 1964

== Singles ==
- Si l'amour17 Single – 1963
- Tu peux pas savoir18 Single – 1964
- Tu ne m'aimes pas19 Single – 1964
- Pour mon Anniversaire20 Single – 1964
- Amédée21 Single sous le nom d'Amédée.jr – 1970
- Mon homme à moi... c'est toi Single sous le nom Les Pingouins22 – 1970
- Pauv’ pomme23 Single – 1971
- Je n'ai plus envie sans toi24 Single – 1972
- Au pays de Pierrot25 Single – 1973
- 55–60 (dès que vient le samedi soir) 26 Single – 1973
- Star ou rien27 Single – 1973
- City palace28 Single – 1974
- Sally29 Single avec Gazoline – 1977
- Killer man30 Single avec Gazoline – 1977
- BB for Brigitte31 Single – 1986
