= Antoine (singer) =

French pop singer (born 1944)

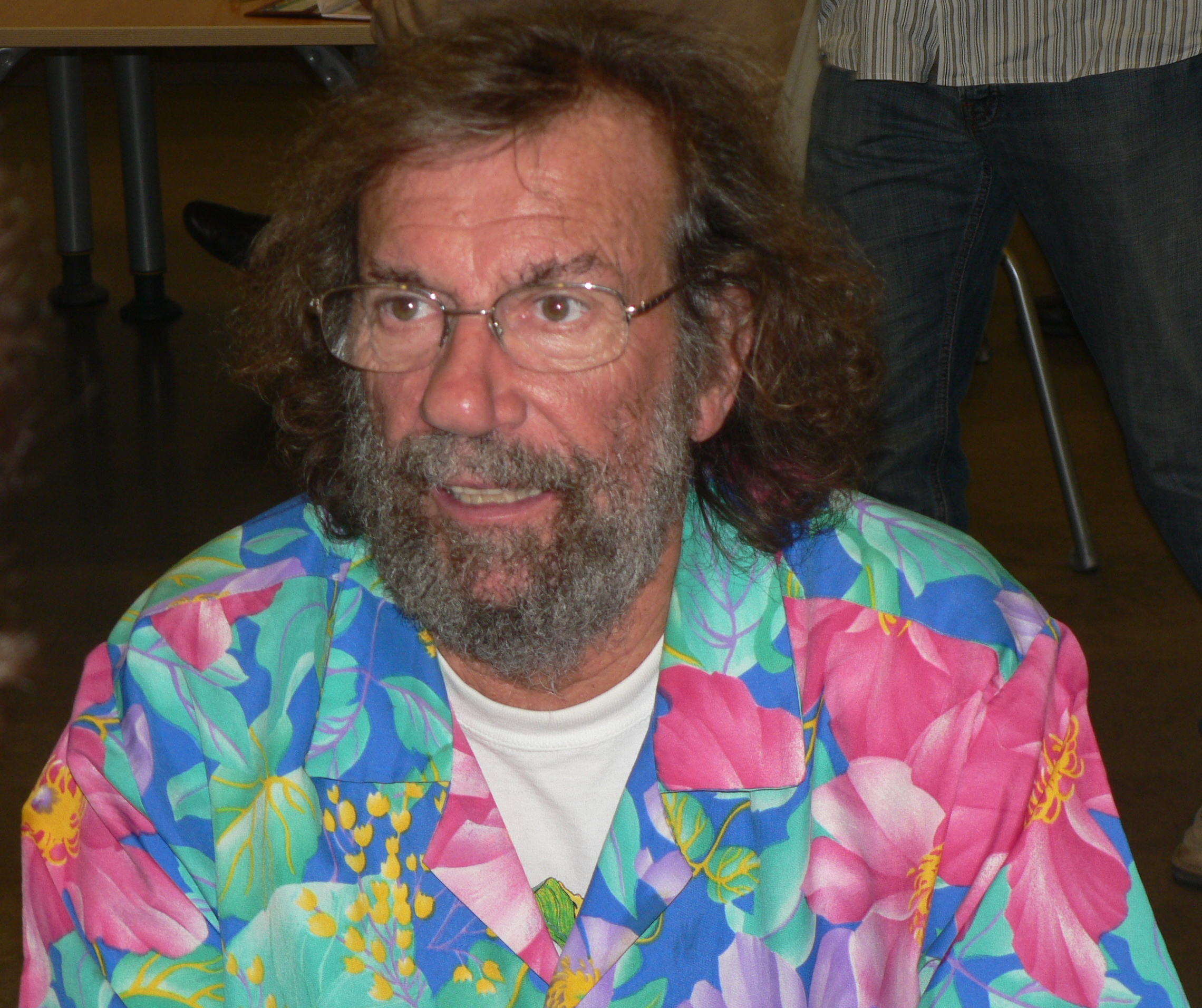

Background information
- Born: Pierre Antoine Muraccioli; 4 June 1944 (age 82); Toamasina, French Madagascar (now the Republic of Madagascar)
- Origin: Paris, France
- Genres: Folk rock, garage rock, protest music
- Occupations: Singer, songwriter, composer, filmmaker, photographer, sailor, writer
- Instruments: Guitar, harmonica
- Labels: Vogue; Barclay; RCA; Universal; Warner Bros. Home
- Website: antoine.tv

Pierre Antoine Muraccioli (French pronunciation: [pjɛʁ ɑ̃twan myʁaksjɔli]; born 4 June 1944), known professionally as Antoine, is a French pop singer, and also a sailor, adventurer, writer, photographer, and filmmaker.

As a musician, he was part of a new wave of mid-to-late 1960s French singer-songwriters, comparable in some ways to Bob Dylan or Donovan, but also evidencing some of the harder-edged garage rock style similar to the Rolling Stones, the Animals, and Them, and achieving some measure of pop stardom.

Beginning in the 1970s, he de-emphasized his musical endeavors (although he still writes and performs on occasion) in favor of a second career as a solo sailor and adventurer, which he has documented with many books and films.

== Early life ==
From a Corsican family of Vivario, Antoine was born on 4 June 1944 in Toamasina in Madagascar, then part of the French colonial empire for which his father was working. As a child he lived in Saint Pierre and Miquelon, Marseille, and French Cameroons, returning to Metropolitan France for good in 1958. He graduated from the Lycée Champollion in Grenoble, excelling in advanced mathematics.

A 1964 stay in the United States exposed Antoine to the burgeoning folk music revival on the American east coast. He enrolled as an engineering student in the École Centrale Paris (from which he graduated in 1966), but also began traveling, playing his guitar, and singing in bistros for pocket money. He also began writing songs.

== Garage rock icon and later musical career ==
Signing with the Disques Vogue record label in 1965, Antoine released his first single "European Highway Number 4" (French: "Autoroute européenne numéro 4"). In 1966 he released the EP Antoine's Fever Dreams (French: Les Élucubrations d'Antoine) against the advice of his producer Christian Fechner and Vogue management. The record, with protest songs and exhibiting a garage band style in sharp contrast to the yé-yé style then in vogue, resounded with the less carefree and more militant spirit growing among French youth (this was two years before the May 1968 events in France). Along with figures such as Jacques Dutronc and Michel Polnareff (and to some degree Ronnie Bird and Herbert Leonard), Antoine thus led a new wave in French music. The title song was Antoine's biggest hit.

Antoine's first full LP album was Antoine Meets the Problems (French: Antoine rencontre les Problèmes), made with the existing band les Problèmes (who soon renamed themselves les Charlots and went on to long-term success, particularly in film). Some of the songs on the album were of Antoine and les Problèmes playing together, but many were by Antoine alone or les Problèmes alone, and many were previously released singles. One song on the album which became particularly associated with Antoine was "I'll Say What I Think and I'll Live How I Want" (French: "Je dis ce que je pense, je vis comme je veux")

Having achieved some mainstream popularity, Antoine fell more under the control of his producer, being given songs he did not always like and being pressured to change his musical style and even appearance. A 1968 song "Take Me Home" (French: "Ramenez-moi chez moi") suggested his disillusionment with being a musician, even as his popularity was spreading to Italy, where, after an initial hit, "Pietre" (Stones), still in the protest-song vein, he shifted soon toward a soft pop style and scored some successes like "Cannella" and "La tramontana".

In 1971, he recorded a single with celebrity television host Danièle Gilbert, "'Scuse Me, Mister Antoine" (French: "S'cusez-moi M'sieur Antoine") and in 1973 he appeared in the revival of the 1921 operetta Dédé, singing alongside Georgette Plana.

Although he has never stopped writing and performing music, in 1974 he shifted his focus to the sea and to other pursuits.

=== Rivalry with Johnny Hallyday ===
In "Antoine's Fever Dreams" (the title song to the EP of the same name), Antoine, who represented with his emblematic long hair and flowered shirts a new look and new sound, made fun of Johnny Hallyday (the "French Elvis", a pioneer and icon of French rock and roll, but outdated in Antoine's eyes): "Things should keep on changing / The world would be much more fun / We'd see airplanes in the subway corridors / And Johnny Hallyday in a Circus Medrano zoo cage". Hallyday responded with an answer song "Long Hair and Short Ideas" (French: "Cheveux longs et idées courtes") ("If words were sufficient to make things so / Then he, with his long hair, and sitting on his hands / Would indeed have me locked in a cage...") and the two commenced a back-and-forth rivalry which redounded to the publicity benefit of both (Hallyday's song was a hit and helped revivify his career) and which continued in various songs and other forms into the 21st century (for instance, with each appearing in TV advertising for competing optician chains in the 2000s).

== Sailor ==
In 1969 Antoine discovered sailing by chance, after renting a house on the French Riviera which included a dinghy. In October 1974, Antoine embarked on the life of a sailor and adventurer. He set out on the 14-meter steel schooner Om, sailing 17,000 miles solo and calling on Atlantic ports such as Nouadhibou, Rio de Janeiro, St. Helena, Tristan da Cunha, and Cayenne until 1980.

From 1981 to 1989, Antoine sailed in the Atlantic and Pacific in the 10-meter aluminum sloop Voyage, and since 1989 he has sailed in the 12.5-meter catamaran Banana Split.

Antoine published the first book of his adventures, Globedrifter (French: Globe Flotteur) in 1977; several more have followed, including his book on distance navigation Setting Sail (French: Mettre les Voiles) (Note: Literally "Setting Sail", but the French phrase Mettre les Voiles also has the idiomatic implication of "scram" or "get lost", so "Getting Lost" would be another (and more jovial) way to interpret the title) Antoine has made films of his voyages, and has appeared on radio and television describing his adventures, as well published various books. He continues to write new songs (such as "Hands Off The Sea" (French: "Touchez Pas à la Mer")) and give occasional concerts. He has lectured at conferences sponsored by World Knowledge (French: Connaissance du Monde), the large French conference organization. When not at sea or traveling he lives with his long-term companion Francette in Paris or at a farm in Auvergne he bought with his early pop-star royalties.

== Works ==
=== Discography ===
Singles

- "Les Elucubrations D'Antoine" (1966, France), Disques Vogue – V 4225) (Note: "Les Elucubrations D'Antoine" at Discogs)
- "Un éléphant me regarde" (1966, France), Disques Vogue – V.45-1363) (Note: "Un éléphant me regarde" at Discogs)
- "La tramontana"/"Voglio andare in guerra" (1968, Italy) Fonit Cetra
- "Taxi" (1970, France), Disques Vogue – V. 45-1701) (Note: "Taxi" at Discogs)
- "Bonne Chance" (1971, France), Disques Vogue – 45. V.4013) (Note: "Bonne Chance" at Discogs)
- "'Scusez-Moi M'sieur Antoine" (with Danièle Gilbert)(1971, France), Disques Vogue – 45 V 4004) (Note: "'Scusez-Moi M'sieur Antoine" at Discogs)
- "Ra-Ta-Ta" (1990, France), Disques Vogue

EPs

- Les Elucubrations D'Antoine (1966 (France), Disques Vogue – EPL 8417)

Albums

- Antoine Rencontre Les Problèmes (as Antoine Et Les Problèmes) (1966 (France), Disques Vogue – LVLXS 82-30) (Note: Antoine Rencontre Les Problèmes at Discogs)
- Madame Laure Messenger, Claude, Jeremie, Et L'Existence De Dieu (1966 (France), Disques Vogue – CLD 712 ) (Note: Madame Laure Messenger, Claude, Jeremie, Et L'Existence De Dieu at Discogs)
- Antoine (1966 (France), Disques Vogue) (Note: Antoine at Discogs)
- Antoine (1967 (France?) RTE Records)1967
- Je Reprends La Route Demain(1967 (France), Disques Vogue – CLD 707 30) (Note: Je Reprends La Route Demain at Discogs)
- À L'Olympia [live album] (1968 (France), Disques Vogue – CLVLX 363) (Note: À L'Olympia at Discogs)
- Antoine (1968 (France), Disques Vogue – CLD 725) (Note: Antoine at Discogs) (Note: Not to be confused with the 1966 Disques Vogue album, nor the 1967 RTE album, nor an album sung in Italian released around this time, all of which were also titled Antoine and all of which were different albums.)
- Dites-Moi Ma Mère (1969 (France), Disques Vogue – SLVLX 395) (Note: Dites-Moi Ma Mère at Discogs)
- Album Pour Les Grands Et Jeux Pour Tout Petits... (1969 (France), Disques Vogue – ANT. 1) (Note: Album Pour Les Grands Et Jeux Pour Tout Petits... at Discogs)
- Ra-Ta-Ta (1970 (France), Disques Vogue – SLD 778) (Note: Ra Ta Ta at Discogs)
- Larraldia (1971 (France), Disques Vogue – SLD. 808) (Note: Larraldia at Discogs)
- Nocciolino (1978, Italy), Fonit Cetra. He also covered popcorn by Gershon Kingsley and gave it French lyrics, German lyrics, Spanish lyrics, and Italian lyrics.

=== Bibliography ===
- Globe-flotteur ou Les 7 péchés capitaux d'un navigateur solitaire, Arthaud, collection Mer, 1977
- Mettre les voiles avec Antoine, Arthaud, 1977
- Bord à bord, Arthaud, collection Mer, 1979
- Solitaire et Compagnie, Arthaud, collection Mer, 1980
- Cocotiers, Arthaud, 1981
- Voyage aux Amériques, Arthaud, 1985
- 1965 (roman), 1987
- Iles… était une fois Gallimard, 1989
- Amoureux de la Terre Gallimard, 1991
- Sur trois océans Gallimard, 1993
- Fêtes la cuisine Gallimard, 1995
- Collection Merveilleuses îles ( 8 volumes)
- La Plus Belle Ile du Monde (La Martinière)
- D'Île en Île (Hermé)
- Autobiographie : Vol. 1 Oh Yeah, Arthaud, 2007
- Autobiographie : Vol. 2 Au bout de mes rêves, Arthaud, 2008
- 20 Paradis, Gallimard, 2009
- Au Paradis des Animaux, Gallimard, 2011
- Délivrez-nous des dogmes, Léo Scheer, 2012
- 40 Escales, 40 ans de navigation, Gallimard, 2014
