= Déportivo =

French rock band

- Origin: Bois-d’Arcy, France
- Genres: Rock
- Years active: 2004-present
- Members: Jérôme Coudanne; Richard Magnac; Julien Bonnet
- Website: Official site

Dēportivo is a French rock band from Bois-d'Arcy, Yvelines, a suburb of Paris.

Déportivo is an independent French rock band originating from Bois-d'Arcy, in the Yvelines department.

The original trio is composed of Jérôme Coudanne (singer-guitarist, lyricist and composer of the band), Richard Magnac (bassist), and Julien Bonnet (drummer). During the tour for the album Domino, the trio became a quartet with the addition of guitarist Cédric Le Roux. When Déportivo returned in 2022, the line-up included Jérôme Coudanne (vocals and guitar), Julien Bonnet (drums), Clément Fonio (replacing Richard Magnac on bass), Cédric Le Roux (guitar), and Alexandre Maillard (keyboards).

== Biography ==
The members of Déportivo met in Bois-d'Arcy, Yvelines. Passionate about music, particularly rock, they decided to form a band, inspired by live performances from bands like Les Wampas, Noir Désir, and Sloy.

Their working method was simple: Jérôme Coudanne brought his compositions to rehearsals, where Julien Bonnet (drums) and Richard Magnac (bass) added their parts. After two years of rehearsing at ROCKSCÈNE Studios, located in a warehouse in Coignières, they built a repertoire of about fifteen songs. In April 2003, they sent their demos to labels and concert venues. They were quickly contacted by several record companies.

In the summer of 2003, the band performed at the House of Live near the Champs-Élysées in front of nearly all major French labels and concert promoters. Contract offers poured in, and the band eventually signed with Barclay Records and Le Village Vert. After starting on stage, they released the EP La Salade in the fall of 2003.

== Parmi eux (2004–2006) ==
Their debut album Parmi eux, recorded at Black Box Studio by Arnaud Bascuñana, was released on May 4, 2004. It was a stage success, with the band opening for Les Wampas and wrapping up the tour 140 concerts later. In Paris, they sold out venues like La Cigale and Le Bataclan, and also opened for Louise Attaque at the Zénith and the Grand Rex. The album was critically acclaimed, with Les Inrockuptibles describing it as "the most beautiful French sonic experience since Noir Désir." Commercially, about 50,000 copies of Parmi eux were sold.

Tracks 13 and 14, Au Plaisir and Wait A Little While (acoustic), were included in the 2005 reissue. The limited 2004 edition featured four additional tracks: Kaé Kaé, First, Sur le moment (acoustic), and Yards of Blonde Girls (a Jeff Buckley cover).

== Déportivo (2007–2010) ==
Their second album, produced by Gordon Raphael (producer of The Strokes) and Yann Madec, was released on October 22, 2007. The fourth track, Les Bières aujourd'hui s'ouvrent manuellement, is a cover of Christophe Miossec. Arnaud Samuel from Louise Attaque plays violin on the track.

A limited edition (CD + DVD) of the album includes clips from the first album (Parmi eux, 1 000 moi-même, À l’avance, and Paratonnerre) and a 20-minute recording session video.

The album received strong critical reception: Les Inrockuptibles called it "furious and intense," while Libération praised it as confirming the promise shown on their debut. Concerts were packed, notably their performance on June 21, 2008, in Place Denfert-Rochereau for the Fête de la Musique, in front of over 20,000 people. The album entered directly into the top 30 sales.

In 2008, they recorded a cover of Alain Souchon’s La vie ne vaut rien with Gaëtan Roussel, available for free. In June 2009, the trio released a free live DVD En ouvrant la porte.

== Ivres et débutants (2011–2012) ==
The band's third album, produced by Mark Plati, was released on March 7, 2011. The lead single was the title track Ivres et débutants. A tour of more than 70 dates followed, with Philippe Almosnino (Les Wampas), Vincent David (Garbo), and Cédric Le Roux joining the band on stage.

Since December 2012, the group has offered a free stream of their December 14, 2011 concert at L'Alhambra (Paris).

== Domino (2013–2015) ==
The band’s fourth album, Domino, was released on October 14, 2013. It was their first independently produced record, after leaving Barclay following Ivres et Débutants to create their own label, Titanic Records. Critics praised the album. Les Inrockuptibles noted the return of "Déportivo’s sharp, intense rock in ten incisive tracks, some with a venomous charm." Rock & Folk called it "a superb result showing true harmony between lyrics and music."

== Reptile (2025) ==
A Fresh and Blazing Comeback with Reptile

Released on October 21, 2024, Reptile marks Déportivo’s fiery return, bursting with energy and freshness. After a 7-year hiatus, fans had nearly given up hope—until the band made a surprise return to the stage in 2022. This sparked a wave of enthusiasm, with sold-out shows at La Cigale (2023), Le Trianon (2024), and L’Olympia (March 29, 2025). Far from nostalgic, these performances capture the band’s present vitality. Jérôme Coudanne says, “Everyone comes to Déportivo shows for a chaotic celebration of joy. Our satisfaction now comes from reuniting and seeing people smile.”

DECLARATION OF INDEPENDENCE Entirely funded by fan pre-orders, Reptile continues the path of independence started with their previous album—no label, no physical distributor, no publisher, no public subsidies. This reflects their desire to keep full control and release music at their own pace. Coudanne notes, “Total independence doesn’t really exist, because you’re still tied to programmers’ choices, platform strategies, and audience expectations. The idea is to keep publishing music our way while reducing intermediaries.”

INTROSPECTIVE AND WILD Reptile explores timeless themes: youth, fate, instinct, and inevitability. With minimalist music and striking lyrics, it balances the urgency of living with the passage of time, blending melancholy with euphoria. Each track captures a raw, emotional snapshot.

DIRECT, INSTINCTIVE AND SOPHISTICATED SONGS Musically, Reptile veers into alternative rock with the high-energy Fiasco, and grunge with the Nirvana-like title track Reptile. There are also calmer moments like the folk ballad J’aurais Dû T’en Parler and the poignant Trainards. Clément Daquin’s clever, refined production offers rich textures, especially on the radio-friendly (L)égo. Déportivo stays true to their sonic identity while evolving their sound.

TRACK BY TRACK REPTILE – The only track not composed by Jérôme Coudanne, but by guitarist Cédric Le Roux. It evokes the instinct and fantasy of youth.

(L)ÉGO – The most pop track on the album, reminiscent of Coudanne's solo project Navarre. A message of encouragement to children shaken by failure.

RÉVOLUTION BENCO – Written in 2022 as a potential single. It follows a 12–13-year-old boy discovering his first anger, "plotting revolutions over his Benco."

FIASCO – The last song written for the album, it explores failed communication in relationships or society. Ends on the mantra: “Boredom will end up being missed.”

J’AURAIS DÛ T’EN PARLER – A raw, poetic confession of deep, often hidden wounds.

ALLOUÉS – Tackles social determinism and the frustration of postponed dreams.

RUBIKSCUBE – A fusion of melancholy and fighting spirit, exploring youth and the urge to live intensely.

TRAÎNARDS – Suggests that luck plays a crucial role in personal achievement, with the phrase "all more or less lucky at departures and arrivals."

PERDU ! – A dual-meaning track balancing defiance and despair.

AVIDE – A soft reflection on a jump into the unknown in the pursuit of freedom and truth.

Influences and Themes The band's influences range from Miossec to The Clash, Velvet Underground, Mano Negra, Louise Attaque, Sloy, Les Thugs, Manu Chao, Pixies, Jeff Buckley, Nirvana, The Doors, and Noir Désir.

Their lyrics are open to interpretation, allowing for multiple readings. The album Parmi eux addresses themes like weariness (La salade), adolescent naivety (Alambiqué), death (À l’avance), and anorexia (Paratonnerre), with humorous, metaphorical phrasing. The second album focuses on intoxication and unexpected recognition (La Brise, En ouvrant la porte, I Might Be Late), as well as misunderstanding (Exorde barraté) and difficult romantic relationships (with the Miossec cover).

== Reception ==
Déportivo was featured on the cover of Les Inrockuptibles alongside the band Luke in November 2005. They also appeared on the covers of Rock Sound (July 2005) and Guitar Part (2007).

The band is appreciated by their peers. Serge Teyssot-Gay (Noir Désir) said in Rolling Stone (Feb 2005) he was "sensitive to Déportivo’s music." Dionysos invited them to cover Neige (as Little Mama) on Les Métamorphoses de Mister Chat (2006). Alain Bashung said in a 2008 Rock & Folk interview that he "enjoyed Déportivo’s first album." Gaëtan Roussel praised them on Taratata in April 2008. Miossec dedicated Les Bières… to Jérôme at concerts in 2007 and 2014.

== Members ==
Jérôme Coudanne – vocals, guitar (songwriter-composer)

Richard Magnac – bass, backing vocals (2000–2022)

Julien Bonnet – drums, backing vocals

Cédric Le Roux – guitar

Clément Fonio – bass (live performances)

Alexandre Maillard – keyboards and guitar (live performances)

== Discography ==
Year	Album	Peak positions	Notes
Year	Album	FR	Notes
2004	Parmi eux	90	Track list: 1. 1000 moi-même 2. Parmi eux 3. Queen of universe 4. Sur le moment 5. Mémoire; 6. L'immobilité; 7. Alambiqué; 8. La salade 9. Wait a little while 10. A l’avance 11. Roma; 12. Paratonnerre
2007	Deportivo	29	Track list: 1. Exorde baratté 2. Ne le dis à personne et personne ne le saura 3. Clásico (Share your love); 4. Les bières aujourd’hui s’ouvrent manuellement (Miossec cover); 5. I might be late 6. En ouvrant la porte 7. La brise 8. Blue lights 9. La colline 10. Suicide Sunday (Part II)
2011	Ivres et débutants	29	Track list: 1. Fais-moi comprendre 2. Ivres et débutants 3. Intrépide; 4. Au milieu 5. Nos baisers 6. Au saut du lit 7. Pistolet à eau 8. Rejoue quand même 9. Le bruit que la vie fait 10. N'ai-je ?; 11. On a vraiment cherché 12. C'était cool
2013	Domino	54	Track list: 1. Domino; 2. Personne n'arrive à l'heure 3. En ville 4. Toutes les choses 5. Pourquoi devrais-je?; 6. Both on the same boat 7. Imbéciles; 8. Impossible; 9. Dans ta chambre 10. Chez toi
2025	Reptile		Track list: 1. Reptile; 2. (L)égo; 3. Révolution Benco; 4. Fiasco; 5. J'aurais dû t'en parler 6. Alloués; 7. Rubikscube; 8. Traînards; 9. Perdu; 10. Avide

=== Other releases ===
- Parmi eux (édition limitée)
- Parmi eux (réédition)
- La salade (maxi)
- First
- Parmi eux (promo)
- 1000 moi-même (promo)
- Roma (promo)
- Deportivo (CD + DVD)
- La brise (promo)
