= Parabellum (French band) =

French punk band

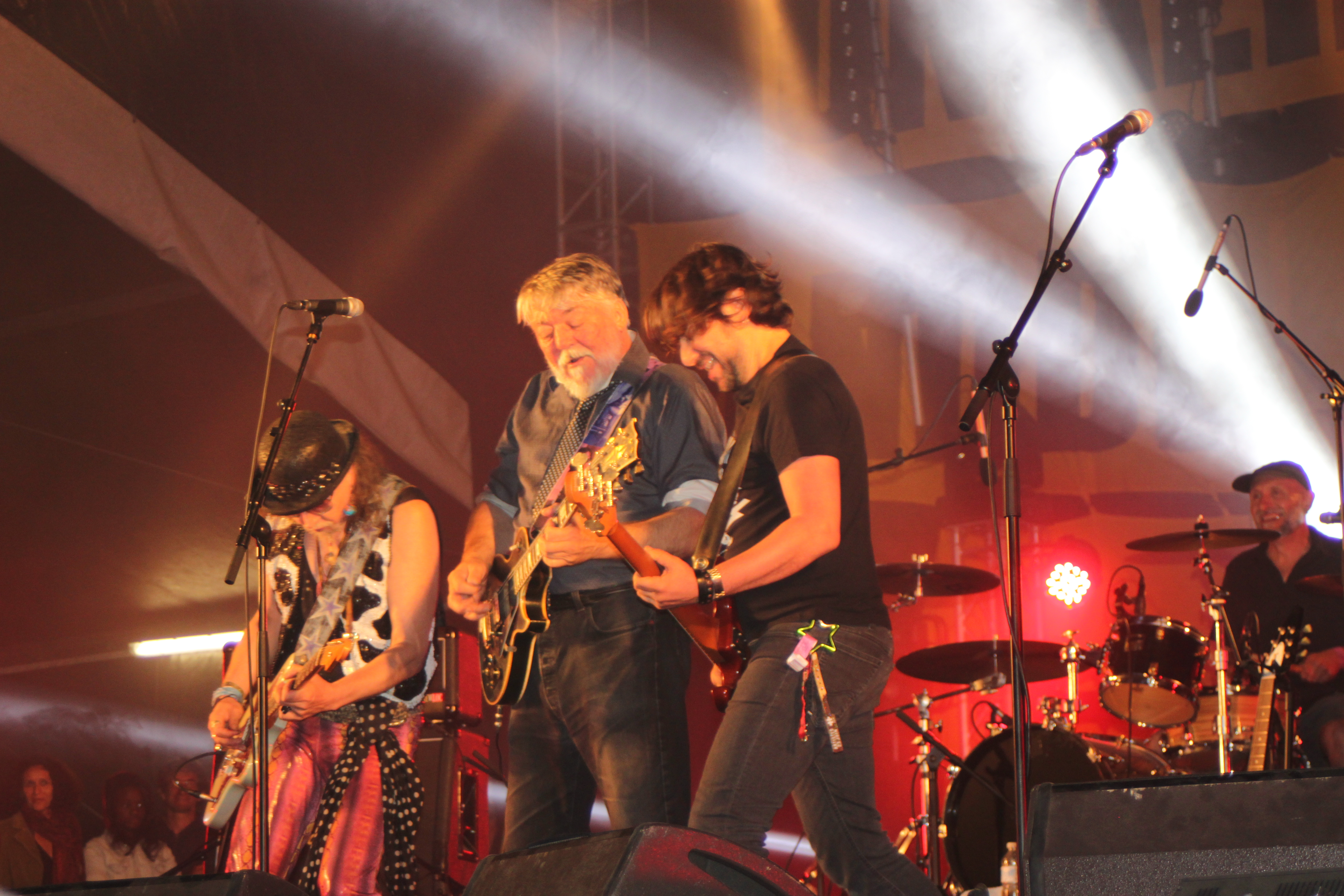
Parabellum in 2013

Parabellum is a French alternative rock and punk band that formed in 1984. Originally active from 1984 to 1991, the band split up in 1991, re-formed in 1998 and resumed touring until the death of Schultz, singer and original member of the band, in 2014.

== Origin of name ==
The name of the band comes from the Latin adage Si vis pacem, para bellum (If you want peace, prepare for war).

== Bibliography ==
The group was originally founded in 1984 by Géant-Vert, at the time manager of Les Porte-Mentaux, a parisian punk rock band. BB Rock, singer of les Porte-Mentaux, considering the lyrics Géant-Vert submitted him, suggests him to set up his own band. Géant-Vert then gathered musicians by recruiting two former members of les Porte-Mentaux: Schultz (his real name, Roger Fritsch) on guitar and Roland Chamarat (nicknamed Roland Chamallow) on bass. The band is completed a little later by Cambouis (whose real name is Jean-François Juvanon) on drums. The name of the band is based on the Latin quotation "Si vis pacem parabellum" ("If you want peace, prepare for war") that Géant-Vert has printed on his T-shirt.

Unable to find a singer, Géant-Vert offers the role to the guitarist Schultz. In 1984, the group released their first EP "Nous sommes gouvernés par des imbéciles" ("We are governed by fools") (where Riton replaced Roland on bass). In 1986, Sven Lava Pohlhammer, Chilean guitarist, having also officiated with les Porte-Mentaux, joined the band. The same year, Parabellum released a LP "Gratuit: 2 en moins" which contains some well-known songs of the band: "Ilot Amsterdam", a cover of the song Amsterdam of Jacques Brel, with modified lyrics and Cayenne, a popular anarchist song often attributed ( probably wrongly) to Aristide Bruant, whose words have been also reworked. Always the same year, Cambouis is replaced by Patrick Lemarchand on the drums. In 1987, the band released "4 garçons dans le brouillard". Most of the band's songs have been written by Géant-Vert, with incisive style, dark humor and a sense of shock-formula as evidenced by this cover note: "Parabellum est au rock, ce qu'une braguette coincée est à une envie de pisser"("Parabellum is to rock, what a stuck fly is to a need to piss").

Nevertheless, in the same year, Géant-Vert decided to stop writing for the group, because of the many conflicts that oppose him to Schultz, the leader of the group. In 1988, Parabellum released "Anarchy in Chiraquie" and "Saturnin". In 1990, Parabellum released their first album "Parabellum", but this one receives mixed reviews. Launched in a badly organized tour in Canada, the group played a final concert on 18 June 1991 at Foufounes Electriques in Canada before separating.

In 1997, Parabellum decided to reform for a unique concert in Marmande, in front of 7000 people that gave rise to a live album: Post-Mortem. The following year, they went back on tour. Patrick Lemarchand and Roland Chamarat nevertheless left the group and were replaced respectively by Zed (his real name Philippe Leffray) and Olivier Meyrand. In 1999, the band released their first album from Parabellum in 1990: Bordel Inside, followed in 2002 by Bunker. In 2000, Zed died electrocuted at the age of 34 and was replaced by Xavier Mesa, former drummer of BB Doc and Boys Butchers.

The group was active and released three more albums until the death of Schultz on 12 September 2014 from pulmonary edema. On 11 January 2017, Sven Lava Polhammer dies at the age of 59.

== Influences ==
The music used in the song Saturnin (1988), in the Parabellum compilation, and reused in the song Lies (1997) is from the band Cock Sparrer.

One can also compare Anarchie en chiraquie (1988) to Rock You Like a Hurricane (Scorpions, Love at First Sting, 1984).

== Legacy ==
Parabellum is considered one of the leading groups of the French punk rock scene because of its longevity, the caustic, claimant, anarchist and humorous character of its texts mocking politics and society ("Anarchy in Chiraquie", "Osmose 99", Welcome to Paradise" ...). Musically, Schultz defined Parabellum as "the most punk of rock'n'roll bands and the most rock'n'roll of punk bands". Parabellum was known for their rock interpretation of some popular French or French-language songs like Amsterdam by Jacques Brel (now Ilot Amsterdam), A Saint-Lazare by Aristide Bruant or Cayenne.

Schultz is known to have been in parallel with Parabellum, guitarist of Los Carayos, a band formed by François Hadji-Lazaro, Manu Chao and Alain Wampas. Géant-Vert was also lyricist of Les Rats, where Roland Chamallow was a bassist.
