= La Grande Sophie =

French singer-songwriter

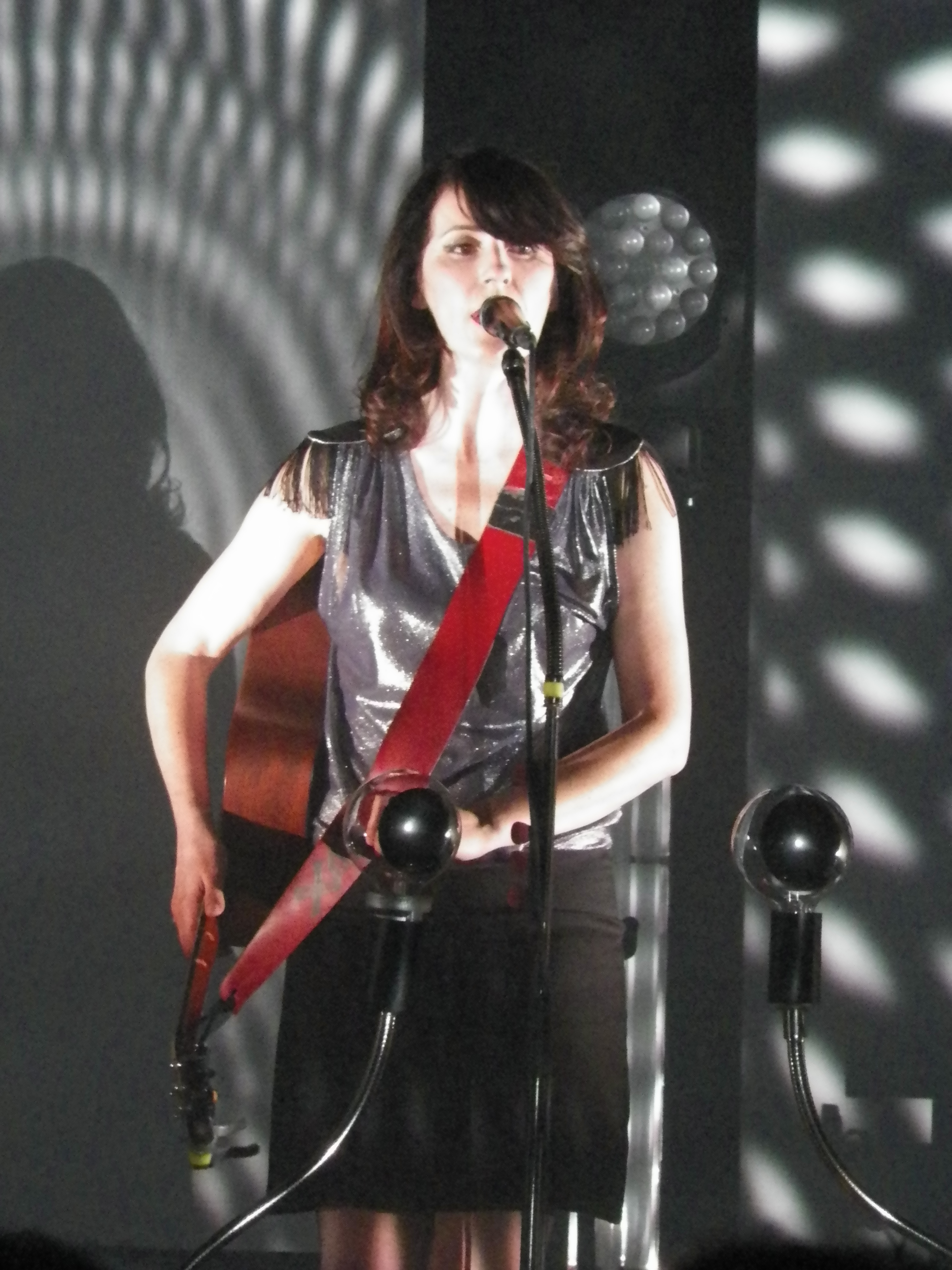
- La Grande Sophie in concert, 2012

Background information
- Also known as: LGS
- Born: Sophie Huriaux; July 18, 1969 (age 57); Thionville, France
- Genres: Pop, rock, chanson
- Years active: 1997–present
- Labels: AZ / Universal Music (since 2003); Epic / Sony-BMG (2001–2003); Les Compagnons De La Tête De Mort (1997–2001)
- Website: www.lagrandesophie.com.fr

Sophie Huriaux (born July 18, 1969), better known by her stage name La Grande Sophie, is a French singer-songwriter. She got her start in the mid-1990s in the Paris alternative scene.

== Biography ==
=== Childhood ===
Sophie Huriaux was born on July 18, 1969 in Thionville. Sophie lived the whole of her youth in Port-de-Bouc near Marseille, where her parents moved to when she was quite young. She had her first musical idea while watching Jacques Demy's film Peau d'Ane on television. She began playing guitar at age nine, then at 13 she started a band called "Entrée interdite" with her brother and her neighbor. As well as performing covers of hits, she wrote and composed for this group, where she was the leading vocalist and musician. In June 1983 the first Fête de la Musique took place in France. Almost 14 years old, Sophie managed to convince the management of the school to let her group perform.

=== The beginnings ===
At first attracted to the visual arts, especially sculpture, she studied at the École des beaux-arts in Marseille. She continued to write, compose, and play covers, as well as her own songs, at sidewalk restaurants in Marseille. After two years of courses in fine arts she chose to quit her studies to dedicate herself exclusively to music. In 1994, she met Julien Bassouls, the entrepreneur of "Life, Live in the Bar", a group which arranged concerts for young artists, and went up to Paris in 1995. She played in many bars and small venues there, accompanied by guitar and bass drum.

In collaboration with other young artists, including Jean-Jacques Nyssen, Clarika and Philippe Bresson, she participated in writing and staging a musical, La Marée d'Inox, played at the Théâtre Jean Vilar in Suresnes in February 1996.

=== Kitchen Miousic and the first album ===
She created "kitchen miousic", which she defined as considering musical activity as little different from any other daily task. This popular and lifelike approach to writing and performing music was one of her distinctive characteristics. This self-definition also expressed her desire not to be pigeonholed into a specific genre.

Her influences ranged from Jacques Dutronc to Chrissie Hynde of the Pretenders through Polly Jean Harvey and Joe Hisaishi. In 1996 she was invited to the Francofolies festival in La Rochelle. Next year, she released her first self-produced album, La Grande Sophie s'agrandit (La Grande Sophie grows up), on the independent label "Les compagnons de la tête de mort".

=== The majors ===
In 2001, accompanied by other musicians, she released her second album, Le Porte-bonheur (Lucky Charm), on a major label. This album sold over 50,000 copies, thanks to the single Martin.

On May 11, 2004, she released her third album, Et si c'était moi (If it were me), which earned her her first Victoire de la musique in 2005. With the singles Du courage and On savait, the album sales exceeded 130,000, allowing her to appear at the Olympia for the first time in her career. She also recorded a duet with Lee Hazlewood, who she regarded as "one of the most beautiful voices in the world." She also wrote a song, Seventy-Seven, especially for the anniversary of Lee Hazlewood. She also participated in the works for the album On dirait Nino, in honor of the singer Nino Ferrer.

She returned to stores in October 2005 with an album titled La suite… (The sequel…), the tone much more rock, with pushed-forward guitars. The album was accompanied by a long tour through France and Belgium, passing again through the Olympia and ending at the Zénith de Paris in January 2007.

At this point in her career, Sophie paused and questioned herself. She wanted to give herself time to redefine herself in new ways, go back to basics, and refine her style and her arrangements, which she felt were weighed down with layer after layer of guitars. In the summer of 2007, she was invited to the Francofolies in La Rochelle for two concerts:

- July 12, 2007: An event in honor of Barbara, following the publication of her biography by Valérie Lehoux, journalist from Télérama. For the occasion, Sophie covered six titles by Barbara. Sophie also covered "Dis, quand reviendras tu" during her concerts in 2008 and 2009.
- July 14, 2007: On the main stage, she appeared with 60 musicians from concert bands from Lille-Fives and La Rochelle. The initial plan was to use Arno, but following his defection from rehearsals, La Grande Sophie agreed to take up the challenge. Five of his titles and a piece of Barbara were rearranged, with the participation of David Hadjadj.

On February 25, 2008, La Grande Sophie released a digital-only EP, containing acoustic versions of four songs and two previously unreleased tracks ("Un jour de fête" and "Avec un Grand F"). In March 2008 she began a solo acoustic tour, "Toute seule comme une grande", in France, Belgium and Switzerland. In the spirit of her beginnings, she played in small venues with only a guitar, bass drum and pedal. Also, she participated in Autrement dit, an album of covers of Claude François released March 10, 2008, with the song "Le jouet extraordinaire".

=== Des vagues et des ruisseaux ===
The new, long-matured album Des vagues et des ruisseaux (Waves and streams) was released January 26, 2009. The first single was called "Quelqu'un d'autre", a piece for which a video was also released, a nod to the film Inland Empire by David Lynch. According to the artist, the album was distinguished by its "woodsy" tone, and very consistent throughout. More emphasis was given to her voice. La Grande Sophie arranged the pieces on the album herself, with the participation of Edith Fambuena for three of them.

The tour started immediately with two dates at the Alhambra. Sophie was accompanied by three musicians, in broad outline, a drummer, a bassist, and a keyboardist-trumpeter, and, at times, a cellist. The tour lasted 15 months and had around a hundred appearances in France, Belgium, Switzerland and Canada, including at the Casino de Paris and at the Olympia in November 2009 where she received a gold record, as well as the Francofolies at La Rochelle, Spa and Montreal. (La Grand Sophie also received gold discs earlier for Et si c’était moi and La suite…)

At the end of 2009, the jury of "Les Sonos tonnent", representing Le Nouvel Observateur, L'Express and Télérama designated the song "Quand le mois d'avril" as one of the best of the year (as well as "Ton Héritage" from Benjamin Biolay). In January 2010, she was awarded the Grand Prix de l'Académie Charles Cros for her album Des vagues et des ruisseaux.

== Discography ==
=== Albums ===
Year	Album (publisher)	Peak positions			
Year	Album (publisher)	FRA	FRA (DL)	BEL (WA)	SWI
1997	La Grande Sophie s'agrandit (Les Compagnons de la tête de mort)	—	—	—	—
2001	Le Porte-bonheur (Epic/Sony Music France)	—	—	—	—
2003	Et si c'était moi (AZ/Universal)	27	—	84	—
2005	La suite... (AZ/Universal)	21	9	47	—
2009	Des vagues et des ruisseaux	12	10	21	—
2012	La place du fantôme	9	7	12	—
2015	Nos histoires	12		20	—
2019	Cet instant	—	—	37	55
2023	La vie moderne	42	—	127	—

=== Singles ===
Year	Single	Peak position	Album
Year	Single	FRA	Album
2013	"Ne m'oublie pas"	111	—
2016	"Les portes claquent"	194	—
