= La Ruda =

- Origin: Saumur, France
- Genres: Ska/Pop/Punk
- Years active: 1993–2012
- Labels: Wagram Records
- Members: Pierrot, Manu, Fred, Ritchoune, Roro, Philly, Daddy, Xavier
- Past members: Jam, Pee-Why, François, Grub's, Yannos
- Website: laruda.fr

La Ruda is an alternative rock group from Saumur, France formed in 1993. The group was initially called La Ruda Salska, a name inspired by the Polish town: Ruda Śląska; but also by their musical tastes (rock, ska, salsa), and the type of music they produced. In 2003, after over 10 years of performing as La Ruda Salska, four albums, one of which was live, and nearly 500 concerts, they opted to shorten their name to "La Ruda". This also marked a change in their musical style as they now sound more like a rock band with a brass section.

== Band members ==
The current band members are Pierrot (lead vocals, lyrics), Manu (drums), Fred (guitar, vocals), Ritchoune (guitar, vocals), Bruixe (Xavier) (bass, since 2005), Roro (trombone, vocals), Philly (saxophone, vocals, since 1997), and Daddy (Michel) (trumpet).

Former members are Jam (bass, 1993–1999), Pee-Why (bass, 1999–2005), François (saxophone, 1993–1997), Grub's (bass, 1993–1995), and Yannos (guitar, 1993–1995)

== Discography ==
=== Studio albums ===
Year	Title	Track listing	Notes
1996	Le prix du silence	1. Orange - 4:49; 2. Stadio - 4:06; 3. Taper la manche - 5:26; 4. Le prix du silence - 3:48; 5. Roots ska goods - 4:27; 6 Unis - 4:46; 7. Trianon - 5:17; 8. See paname and die - 4:40; 9. Les frères Volfoni - 4:27; 10. Le devoir de mémoire - 4:35; 11. Radio Ska (2005 reissue only).	Le Prix du silence is the first album by La Ruda, released in 1996 (then distributed by Tripsichord) and re-released in 2005 (distributed by Irfan) with the bonus track Radio Ska.
1999	L'Art de la joie	1. Le Bruit du bang; 2. Selon; 3. Que le bon l'emporte; 4. Rien venir; 5. Tant d'argent dans le monde; 6. Du Rififi chez les branques; 7. L'Affut du ramdam; 8. Numéro 23; 9. Le Gauche; 10. L'Art de la joie; 11. L'École des sous sols; 12. Anathème; 13. Barton killer; 14. Gangster Man (2005 reissue only)	L'Art de la joie is the second album by La Ruda, released in spring 1999 and reissued in 2005 with the additional track Gangster Man.
2001	Passager du réel	1. L'odyssée du réel; 2. L'empire du moi; 3. Histoires improbables; 4. La comédie à la française; 5. L'évolutionnaire; 6. Héros cherche aventures; 7. Des tambours et des hommes; 8. Profession détective; 9. Le tort et la raison; 10. Carnet d'une égérie; 11. Les nuits diluviennes; 12. Dépass' man; 13. Indianapolis; 14. Les maux dits	Passager du réel is the third album by La Ruda released in 2001 on the Yelen label.
2003	Loic Da Silva jour La Ruda Salska	1. Trianon; 2. Le prix du silence; 3. L'odyssée du réel; 4. Tant d'argent dans le monde; 5. Rien venir; 6. Roots ska goods; 7. Barton killer; 8. Dépass'man; 9. L'empire du moi; 10. Mado	The Loic Da Silva jour La Ruda Salska album is a reprise of songs on the accordion. It was released in 2003 and includes a new song, Mado, composed for the occasion by Pierrot and Loic.
2004	24 images/seconde	1. Paris en bouteille; 2. Pensées malsaines; 3. 24 images / secondes; 4. Naouel; 5. Dira-t-on encore ?; 6. Chanson pour Sam; 7. Affaire de famille; 8. L'admirable refrain; 9. L'eau qui dort; 10. L'epoux des rancœurs; 11. Tonio; 12. Le pieu et la potence; 13. Travers	24 images/seconde is the fourth studio album by La Ruda, the first where the group appears under that name. It was released on 15 March 2004 under the label Wagram music.
2006	La trajectoire de l'homme canon	1. Un et un font trois; 2. Tierra ne répond plus; 3. Des horizons des péages; 4. La trajectoire de l'homme canon; 5. Marilyne; 6. Mélodie en action; 7. Ronnie sait; 8. De simples choses...; 9. Quand la nuit; 10. Si j'étais une histoire; 11. De la vie jusqu'au cou; 12. Paradis; 13. ... De choses et d'autres; 14. Soyez le bienvenu	La trajectoire de l'homme canon is the fifth album by La Ruda, released on 2 October 2006.
2007	Les bonnes manières	1. Tout va bien (inédit); 2. Tant d'argent dans le monde; 3. Un et un font trois; 4. Si j'étais une histoire; 5. Que le bon l'emporte; 6. De la vie jusqu'au cou; 7. La trajectoire de l'homme canon; 8. Rien venir; 9. L'empire du moi; 10. Le prix du silence 11. La fumée des gauloises (inédit); 12. Bonus vidéo : documentaire live & studio	Les bonnes manières is the sixth album by La Ruda, released on 1 October 2007 on the Irfan label. It consists, in addition to two new compositions, of acoustic rearrangements of songs of the group.
2009	Le Grand Soir	# Le Grand Soir: 1. Go to the party !; 2. Eddie voit rouge 3. Un beau matin au plus tard 4. Dans la même rue 5. Fantomas 2008; 6. Quand le réveil sonne 7. La parade de Gordon Banks; 8. Grand soir 9. Padam Elvis; 10. Si tu allais 11. Lucile; 12. Depuis ce jour	
2011	Odéon 10-14	# Odéon 10-14: 1. Cabaret voltage 2. Les baisers Français; 3. Souviens-toi 2012; 4. L'homme aux Ailes d'Or; 5. Un été en Angleterre; 6. Odéon 10-14; 7. Titi'Rose au cœur 8. Encore une fois 9. 1982; 10. Johnny John Wayne; 11. Le prix de la corde 12. Candide Charlotte	

=== Live albums ===
Year	Title	Track listing	Notes
2000	En concert	1. Roots ska goods; 2. L'instinct du meilleur; 3. Barton killer; 4. Selon; 5. Que le bon l'emporte; 6. Du rififi chez les branques; 7. Le prix du silence; 8. Unis; 9. Le gauche; 10. Numéro 23; 11. Tant d'argent dans le monde; 12. L'art de la joie; 13. Orange; 14. Le devoir de mémoire; 15. Taper la manche; 16. L'école des sous-sols; 17. Trianon; 18. Le bruit du bang; 19. Candide revolver	En concert is the first live recording by La Ruda, which includes songs from the first and second albums. It was released in autumn 2000.
2005	Dans la vapeur et le bruit	Disc 1: 1. L'instinct du meilleur; 2. Le bruit du bang; 3. Affaire de famille; 4. Que le bon l'emporte; 5. Profession détective; 6. Pensées malsaines; 7. 24 images/seconde; 8. Tant d'argent dans le monde; 9. Orange; 10. L'eau qui dort; 11. Chanson pour Sam; 12. Unis; 13. Le prix du silence; 14. Naouël; 15. Dira-t-on encore ?; 16. Le pieux et la potence; 17. Trianon; 18. Numéro 23. Disc 2: 1. L'odyssée du réel; 2. Stadio; 3. Carnet d'une égérie; 4. Paris en bouteille; 5. L'art de la joie; 6. Histoires improbables; 7. Louis	Dans la vapeur et le bruit is the title of both a double CD live album and double DVD recorded 16, 17 and 18 December 2004 in Chabada in Angers. Both were released in 2005. The CD contains a bonus video.

=== DVD ===
Year	Title	Track listing	Notes
2005	Dans la vapeur et le bruit	Disk 1; 1. L'instinct du meilleur 2. Le bruit du bang 3. Affaire de famille 4. Que le bon l'emporte 5. Profession détective 6. Pensées malsaines 7. 24 images/seconde 8. Tant d'argent dans le monde 9. Orange; 10. L'eau qui dort 11. Chanson pour Sam; 12. Unis; 13. Le prix du silence 14. Naouël; 15. Dira-t-on encore ?; 16. Le pieux et la potence 17. Trianon; 18. Numéro 23; Disk 2; 1. L'odyssée du réel 2. Stadio; 3. Carnet d'une égérie 4. Paris en bouteille 5. L'art de la joie 6. Histoires improbables 7. Louis	A double DVD released at the same time as the double CD live album of the same name in 2005. The DVD includes bonus clips and an archive of touring.
