= Anaïs Croze =

French singer

Anaïs
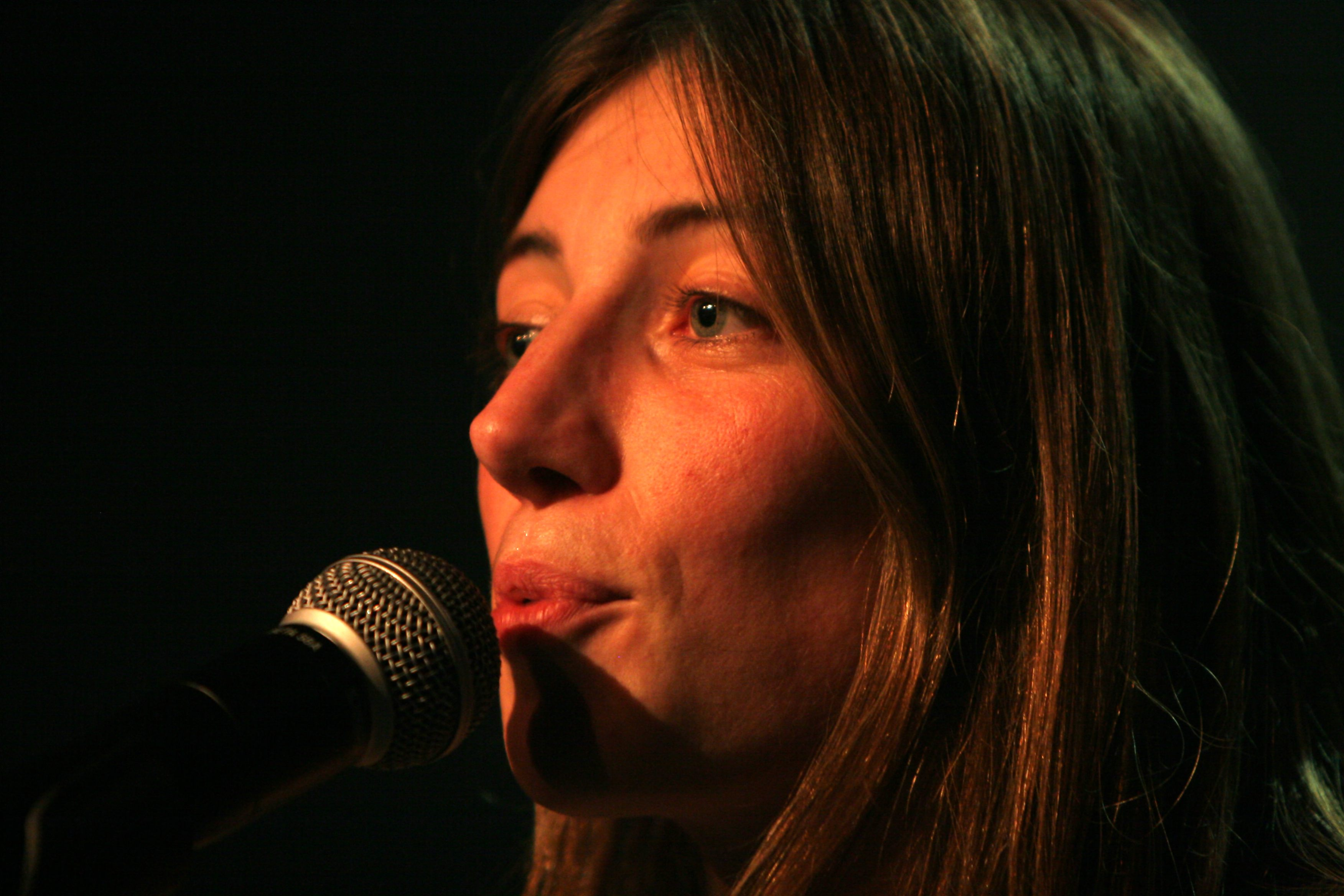
- Anaïs in concert

Background information
- Born: Anaïs Croze; August 20, 1976 (age 50); Grenoble, France
- Occupation: Singer

Anaïs, full name Anaïs Croze (born August 20, 1976), is a French singer. Her first album, called The Cheap Show, was recorded live in January 2004 and released in 2005. The Cheap Show, a pun on "peep-show", is titled such as she is the only musician on stage and makes extensive use of her JamMan pedal.

== Biography ==
Anaïs was born in Grenoble and grew up in Marseille; she studied English in Aix-en-Provence. She was the lead singer, composer and lyricist in Opossum from 1999 to late 2002 when the renowned band split after about 200 gigs in France, Switzerland and even Germany, and a seven-track CD called Excuse-moi, j'voulais te d'mander (Sorry, I Wanted To Ask You). Anaïs then went on a successful solo tour in March 2003 with personal songs and characters full of wit and energy. Her show, the Cheap Show, was based on raw rock energy, minimalism and stand-up, a guitar and a loop pedal she used for voice only.

Croze's fame is often attributed for her elastic voice, imitating or simply paying live tributes to well-known and established Francophone singers such as Francis Cabrel, Eddy Mitchell, Latin (Shakira), American (N.E.R.D, Kelis), Italian-born Carla Bruni or French Canadian Lynda Lemay, and joking around at teenage flirts (Mon cœur, mon amour), Scottish or New Orleans folklore, and various accents ranging from typical Scots to Québécois. Anaïs, who started singing as a child and has always wanted to be an actress and recently a film director, could be described as a modern trobairitz in as much capacity. This is because she not only sings about herself and the world around her, but also acts and plays the parts of caricatured stereotypes of modern times. Although her main concerns seem to be love (Such as Christina), she also tackles more serious problems in humorous ways like racism (Such as Elle sort qu'avec des blacks), depression and solitude (La vie est dure). Her musical style is a happy mixture of folk, pop blues, chanson, rap and at times raggamuffin and heavy metal.

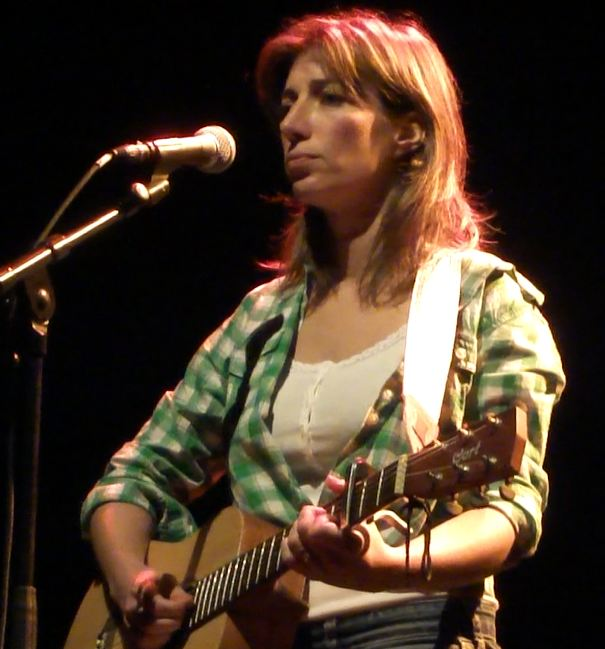
Anaïs performing in 2013

Her self-acknowledged influences are quite varied: Judy Garland and Bette Midler for their music hall artistry; Jerry Lee Lewis for his rough or/and country music side; Brenda Kahn for derision; Canadian Peaches for minimalism; Chris Isaak and others like Etta James; the Beach Boys; Marie Dubas, a French interwar cabaret entertainer whom she quite resembles and describes as "a true hurricane of a woman"; and the White Stripes because "they understood everything about blues and rock". Although Anaïs did learn musical theory and the violin as a little girl, and later the clarinet, she now confesses she can only play the guitar for her own songs and does not even know the names of chords and tunings!

Her band Opossum was a Découverte (nominee as a newcomer band) of the 2003 Printemps de Bourges, to which Anaïs returned two years later to be awarded two trophies this time, the Attention Talent Disque for best new album and the Attention Talent Scène for best new stage artist, which made her a most remarkable winner in this festival.

The Cheap Show, live in Marseille, was her first album. The auto-produced recording of her show ended up selling 500,000, after first starting with word of mouth as its only publicity. Anaïs released a studio version of her first single on February 27, The new edition of "the cheap show" featuring five new tracks, three of which were recorded during Lenoir's Black Session on French radio station France Inter. The Cheap Show is an exception in the French music industry since it was the first time an artist achieved success with a live album as a first album. She was Alain Souchon's supporting artist at the Olympia in Paris in the early days of March 2006. Though she was shortlisted for the 2005 Prix Constantin and more recently the 2006 edition of Victoires de la musique as Révélation scène de l’année (best new stage artist of the year), she failed to win either of the much-coveted accolades this time around, nevertheless, her fresh performance on TV at the Victoires de la Musique put her album on top of the French charts.

In 2007, she worked with LA band The Blood Arm for a duet version of their song Do I Have Your Attention?. She wrote a song for French actress Karin Viard in Maïwenn musical film, "le bal des actrices". She appeared lately in the French channel canal + short TV series "Rien dans les Poches" by Marion Vernoux with Emma De Caunes. She wrote a whole pop show for indie festival lfsm in 2007 called "the Amber story" in which she played and sang all characters

Her 2nd album The Love Album, her first studio album released on November 3, 2008, is produced by Hip hop masterDan the Automator to whom she confessed having a crush on his Lovage album with Mike Patton and Jennifer Charles), his "organic" groovy sound, and sense of humour.

== Discography ==
=== Albums ===
Studio albums

Year	Album information	Chart		
Year	Album information	FR	SWI	BEL
2003	Excuse-moi, j'voulais te d'mander: Album recorded with the Opossum band; Date of release: February 2003	—	—	—
2008	The Love Album: 1st studio album; Date of release: November 3, 2008	9	—	—
2012	À l'eau de javel: 2nd studio album; Date of release: March 5, 2012	30	—	—
2014	Hellno Kitty: 3rd studio album; Date of release: November 2014	97	—	—
2017	Divergente: 4th studio album; Date of release: September 25, 2017	97	—	—

Live albums

Year	Album information	Chart		
Year	Album information	FR	SWI	BEL
2005	The Cheap Show: 1st live album; Date of release: May 2005	4	65	38
2006	The Cheap Show – In Your Face: Re-issue of the album The Cheap Show + DVD; Date of release: October 2006	4	65	38
2010	The Short Version: 2nd live album; Date of release: May 2010			

=== Singles ===
Year	Single	Chart	Album
Year	Single	FR	Album
2006	Mon Cœur, Mon Amour	17	The Cheap Show
2006	Christina	—	The Cheap Show
2007	Do I Have Your Attention ? (The Blood Arm & Anaïs)	—	Lie Lover Lie
2008	Peut-être une angine	43	The Love Album

=== Miscellaneous ===
- Feel, Robbie Williams' cover
