= Bérurier Noir =

French punk rock band

- Also known as: Les Béruriers; Béru; Les Bérus; BxN
- Origin: Paris
- Genres: Alternative rock, punk rock, anarcho-punk
- Years active: 1983–1989; 2003–2006
- Labels: Last Call, Wagram Music
- Members: François Guillemot; Loran; Masto; Laul
- Website: beruriernoir.fr

Bérurier Noir (French pronunciation: [beʁyʁje nwaʁ]) was a French punk rock band active from 1983 to 1989. The band reformed from 2003 to 2006. The band is associated with anarcho-punk.

Materials related to the band were donated to the Bibliothèque Nationale de France in 2021, and an exhibition opened in Paris in 2024.

As of 2024, lead singer Francois is a history lecturer in Lyon.

== Discography ==
=== Studio albums ===
- Macadam massacre (1984)
- Concerto pour détraqués (1985)
- Abracadaboum (1987)
- Souvent fauché, toujours marteau (1989)
- Invisible (2006)

=== Live albums ===
- Meilleurs extraits des deux concerts a Paris (1983)
- Viva Bertaga (1990)
- Carnaval des agités (1995)
- La Bataille de Pali-Kao (1998)
- Même pas mort (2003)
- L'Opéra des Loups + Chants des meutes (2005)

=== Compilations ===
- Enfoncez l'clown (2003)

=== Singles & EP ===
- Nada/Gloco (1983) (split EP with band Guernica, Bérurier Noir contribute four songs)
- Macadam massacre (1984)
- Nada 84 (1984)
- Nada Nada (1985) (stand-alone release of the Bérurier Noir side of the split single Nada/Gloco)
- Joyeux merdier (1985)
- L'Empereur Tomato Ketchup (1986)
- Ils veulent nous tuer (1988)
- Nuit Apache (1988)
- Split Bérurier Noir/Haine Brigade (1988) (split single with band Haine Brigade, Bérurier Noir contribute the song Makhnovtchina)
- Viêt Nam-Laos-Cambodge (1988)
