= Prix Constantin =

French music prize

The Prix Constantin is an annual French music prize awarded to the best album of an artist who has come to prominence during the course of the past year. It was inaugurated in 2002, following the example of the Mercury Music Prize, as an attempt to bring to light artists who have not had major media coverage ("the talents of today and tomorrow"). It is therefore open to individuals or groups who have not yet had a gold album, with the exception of the nominated album. Its basic purpose is to help newer artists who are not very popular to gain publicity. All albums produced in France in the past year are admissible, without restriction on the nationality or language of expression of the artist. The winner is decided by a jury, headed by a musician, which contains representatives from the press, radio, television and record stores.

The Prix Constantin is named after the record industry figure Philippe Constantin, who died in 1996.

== Winners and nominees ==
=== 2011 ===
Winner: Selah Sue – Selah Sue

Nominees:

- Alex Beaupain – Pourquoi battait mon cœur
- Brigitte – Et vous, tu m'aimes ?
- Cyril Mokaiesh – Du Rouge et des Passions
- Lisa Portelli – Le Régal
- Sly Johnson – 74
- Bertrand Belin – Hypernuit
- Cascadeur – The Human Octopus
- L – Initiale
- The Shoes – Crack my Bones

=== 2010 ===
Winner: Hindi Zahra – Handmade

Nominees:

- Arnaud Fleurent-Didier – La reproduction
- Camelia Jordana – Camelia Jordana
- Féfé – Jeune à la retraite
- Gush – Everybody's god
- Stromae – Stromae
- Ben l'Oncle Soul – Ben l'Oncle Soul
- Carmen Maria Vega – Carmen Maria Vega
- Féloche – La vie Cajun
- Zaz – ZAZ

=== 2009 ===
Winner: Emily Loizeau – Pays Sauvage

Nominees:

- Babx – Cristal Ballroom
- Birdy Nam Nam – Manual for Successful Rioting
- Diving with Andy – Sugar Sugar
- Dominique A – La Musique
- Fredo Viola – The Turn
- Hugh Coltman – Stories from the Safe House
- Orelsan – Perdu d'avance
- Piers Faccini – Two Grains of Sand
- Yodelice – Tree of Life

=== 2008 ===
Winner: Aṣa – Aṣa

Nominees:

- Arman Méliès – Casino
- Barbara Carlotti – L'Idéal
- Cocoon – My Friends All Died in a Plane Crash
- Joseph D'Anvers – Les jours sauvages
- Julien Doré – Ersatz
- Moriarty – Gee Whiz But This Is a Lonesome Town
- The Dø – A Mouthful
- Thomas Dutronc – Comme un manouche sans guitare
- Yael Naïm and David Donatien – Yael Naim

=== 2007 ===
Winner: Daphné – Carmin

Nominees:

- AaRON – Artificial Animals Riding On Neverland
- Florent Marchet – Rio Baril
- Justice – †
- Kaolin – Mélanger les couleurs
- Keny Arkana – Entre ciment et belle étoile
- Keren Ann – Keren Ann
- Ours – Mi
- Renan Luce – Repenti
- Rose – Rose

=== 2006 ===
Winner: Abd Al Malik – Gibraltar

Nominees:

- Anis – La chance
- Ayọ – Joyful
- Clarika – Joker
- Emily Loizeau – L'autre bout du monde
- Grand Corps Malade – Midi 20
- Jehro – Jehro
- Katerine – Robots après tout
- Olivia Ruiz – La femme chocolat
- Phoenix – It's Never Been Like That

=== 2005 ===
Winner: Camille – Le fil

Nominees:

- Amadou & Mariam – Dimanche à Bamako
- Anaïs – The Cheap Show
- Bazbaz – Sur le bout de la langue
- Bertrand Betsch – Pas de bras, pas de chocolat
- Pauline Croze – Pauline Croze
- Albin de la Simone – Je vais changer
- Alexis HK – L’homme du moment
- Franck Monnet – Au grand jour
- Nosfell – Pomaïe klokochazia balek

=== 2004 ===
Winner: Cali – L'amour parfait

Nominees:

- Pierre Bondu – Quelqu'un quelque part
- Jeanne Cherhal – Douze fois par an
- Daniel Darc – Crève coeur
- Feist – Let It Die
- Florent Marchet – Gargilesse
- JP Nataf – Plus de sucre
- Ridan – Le rêve ou la vie
- Tété – A la faveur de l'automne
- Rokia Traoré – Bowmboï

=== 2003 ===
Winner: Mickey 3D – Tu vas pas mourir de rire

Nominees:

- A.S. Dragon – Spanked
- Benjamin Biolay – Négatif
- Carla Bruni – Quelqu'un m'a dit
- Diam's – Brut de femme
- Alexis HK – Belle Ville
- Malia – Yellow Daffodils
- Massilia Sound System – Occitanista
- Raphael – La réalité
- Emilie Simon – Emilie Simon

=== 2002 ===
Winner: Avril – That Horse Must be Starving

Nominees:

- Bumcello – Nude for love
- Bénabar – Bénabar
- Danyèl Waro – Bwarouz
- Dionysos – Western sous la neige
- Gotan Project – La Revancha del Tango
- Le Peuple de L'Herbe – P, H test/two
- Renaud Papillon Paravel – La surface de réparation
- Tiken Jah Fakoly – Françafrique
- Vincent Delerm – Vincent Delerm

== See also ==
- Mercury Prize (UK)
- Choice Music Prize (Ireland)
- Polaris Music Prize (Canada)
- Shortlist Music Prize (United States)
- Australian Music Prize (Australia)
- Nordic Music Prize (Nordic countries)
