= Argentines in France =

Argentines in France Argentinos en Francia
Total population
- 17,999

Regions with significant populations
- Paris

Languages
- Spanish · French

Religion
- Christianity · Judaism

Argentine immigration to France refers to Argentine citizens living in the European country.

Argentina is considered a country of immigrants, especially during the 20th century, but as a result of political, social and economic problems that hit the country in recent decades, many Argentines chose to emigrate, mainly to other countries in the Americas or countries where their parents and/or grandparents came from (mainly Spain and Italy).

== History ==
=== Background ===
The ancestral origins of the Argentine nation show recent ancestors of generations predominantly as Italians and Spanish, but with strong German, British, French, Native American, Slavic and Semitic components, making most Argentinians able to join the European Union. However, they faced very different legal circumstances that Spain and Italy had long before they joined the EU migration policy, thousands of people a day come to the consulates of Spain to process the new nationality or obtain a visa.

== Demographics ==
The 2011 census recorded 3,868 Argentine-born people.

The 2012 census recorded 11,899 Argentine-born people.

Year	Argentine-born population	Other data	Immigrants
1999		3.666	
2004			
2006	12,012	3,803	9,361
2007	12,159		
2008	12,316	3,820	
2009			
2010			
2011		3,868	
2012	11,899		
2019	14 253		

== Notable people ==
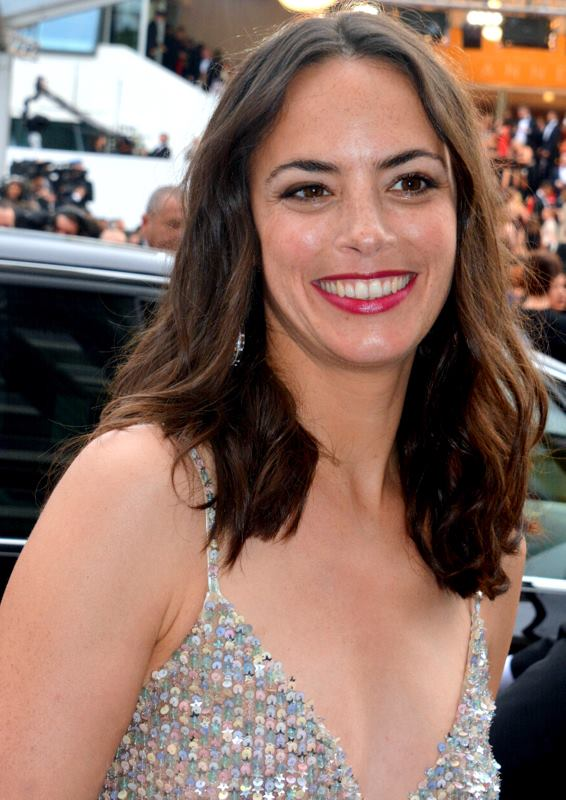
Bérénice Bejo

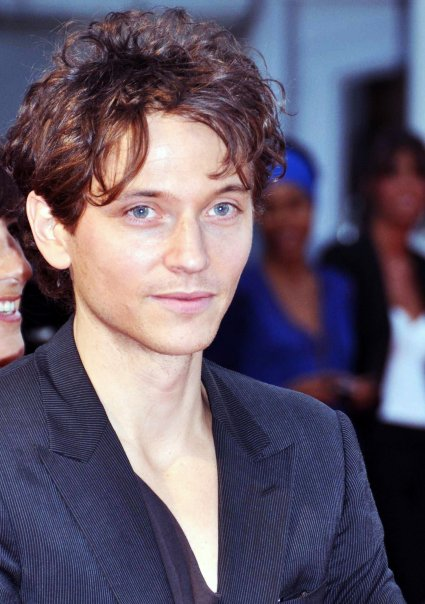
Raphaël Haroche

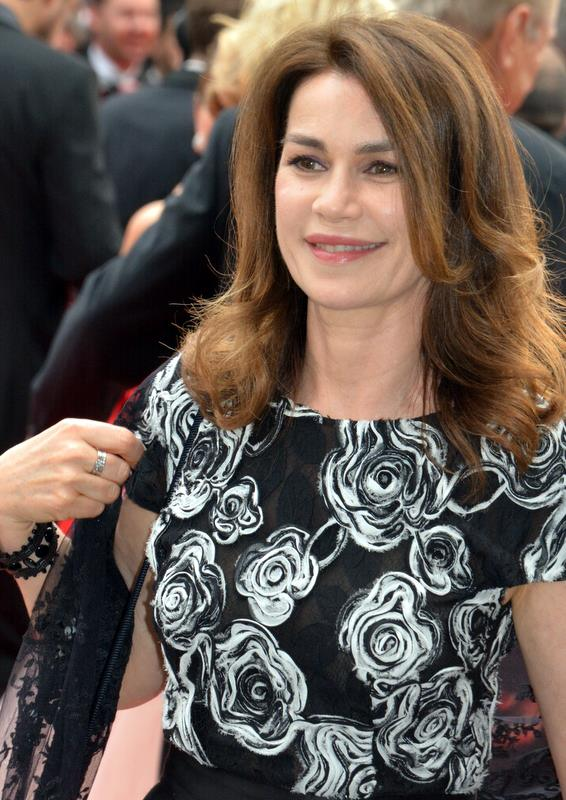
Valérie Kaprisky

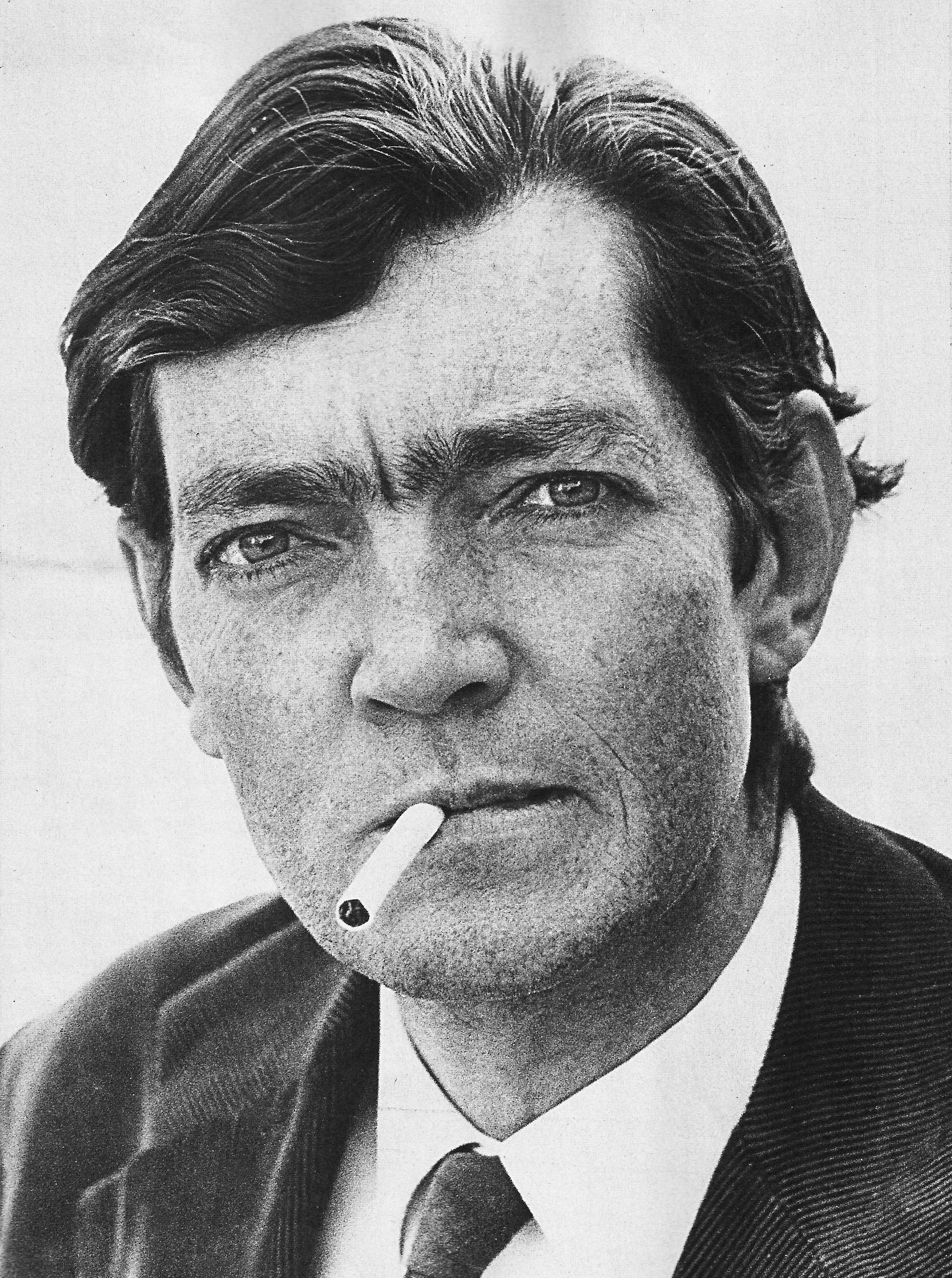
Julio Cortázar

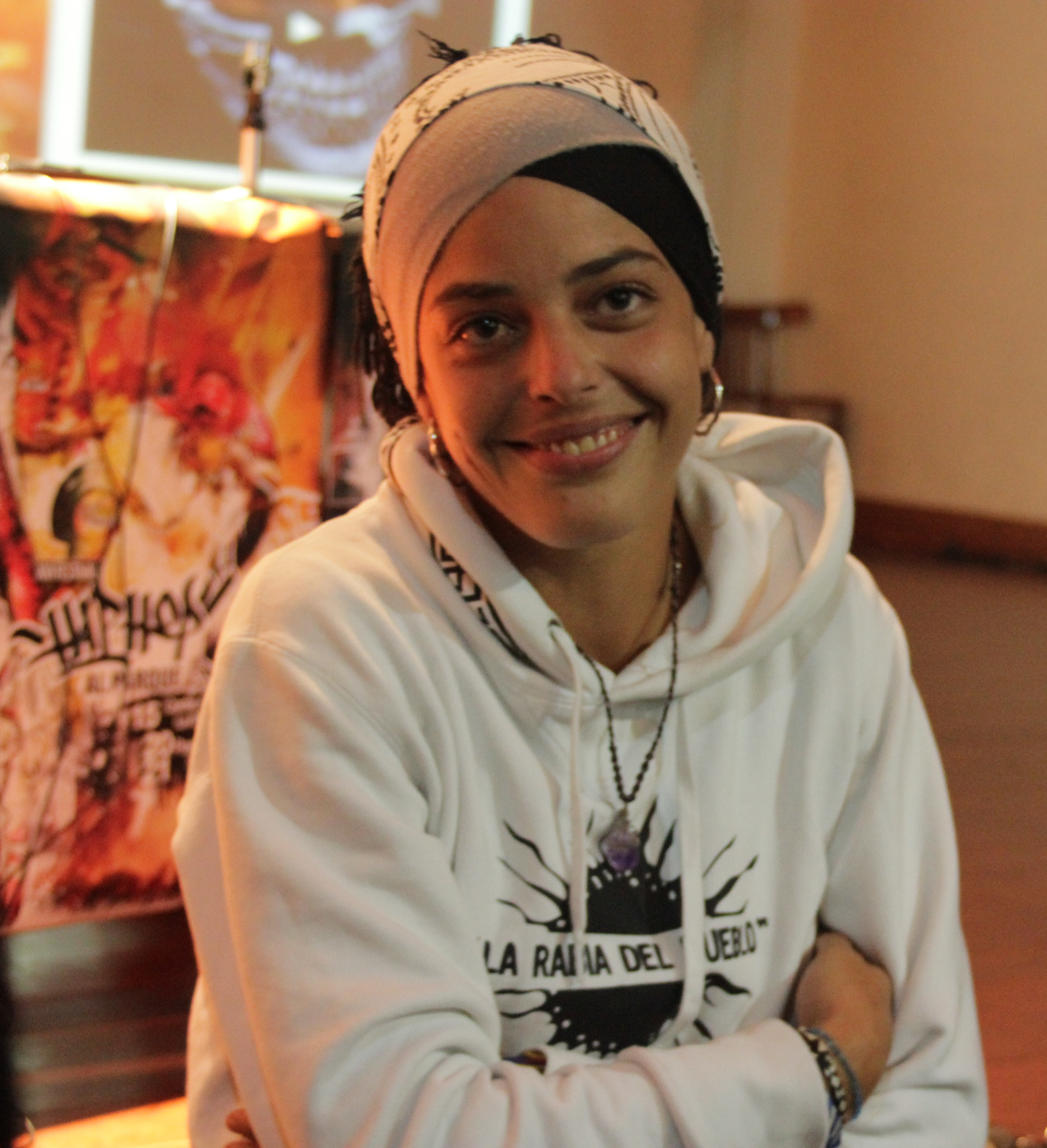
Keny Arkana

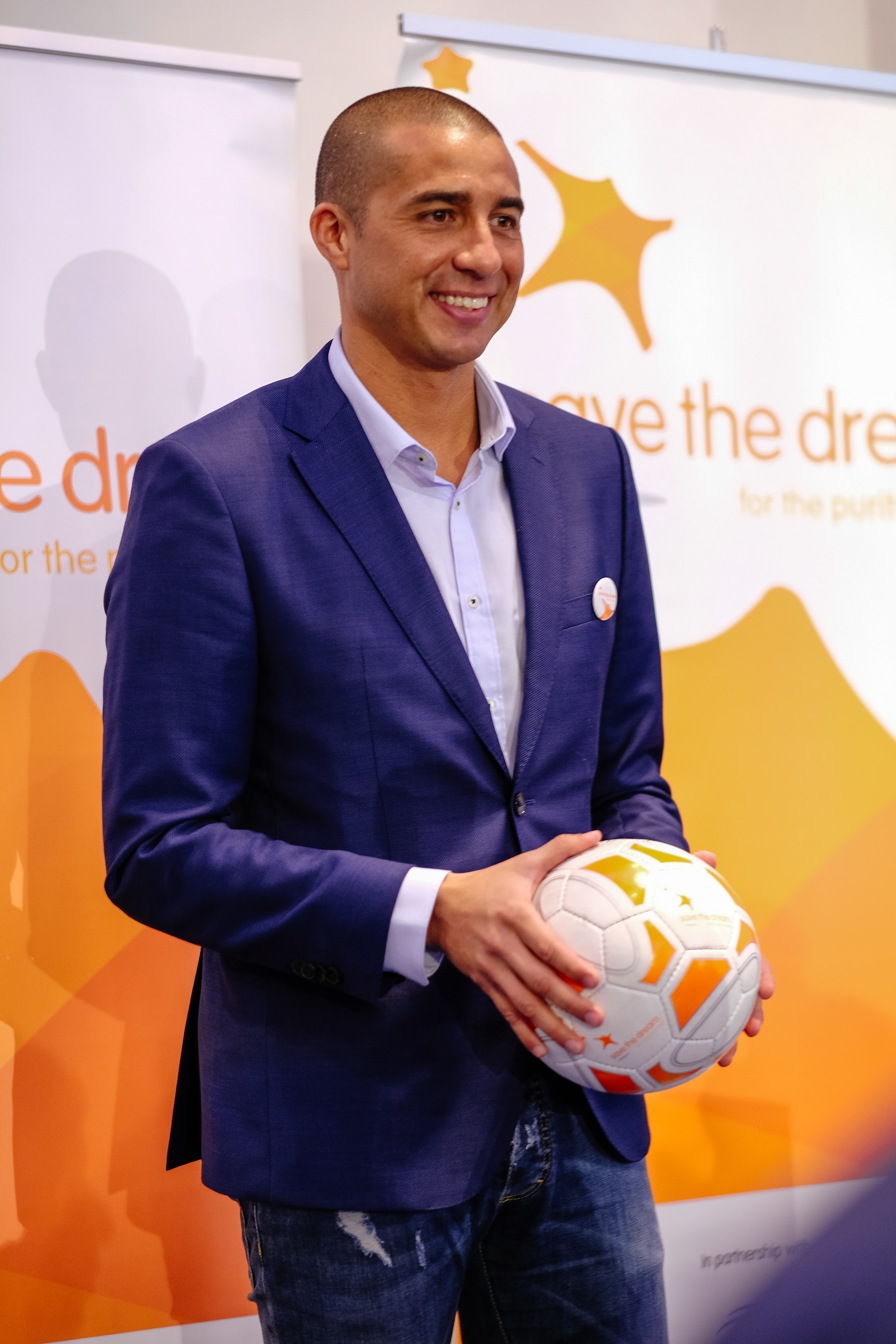
David Trezeguet

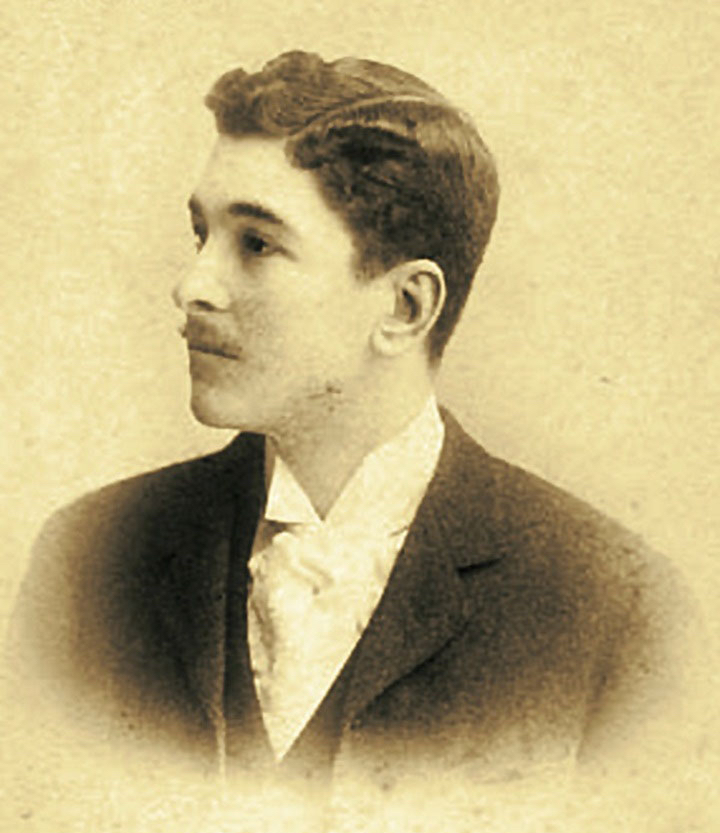
Herman Bemberg

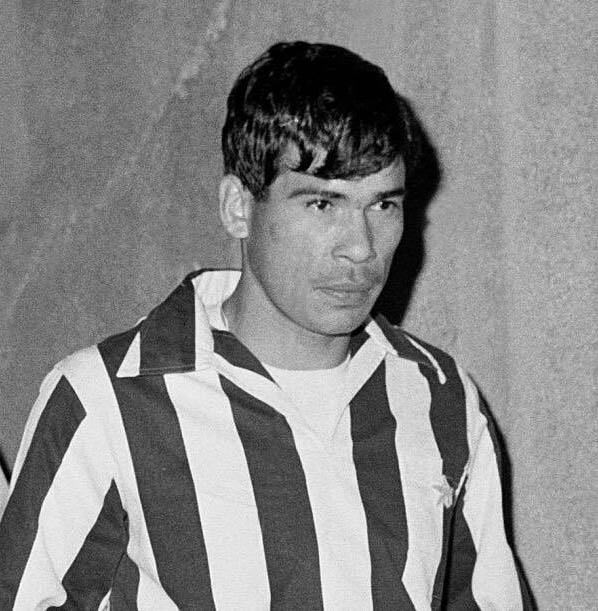
Néstor Combin

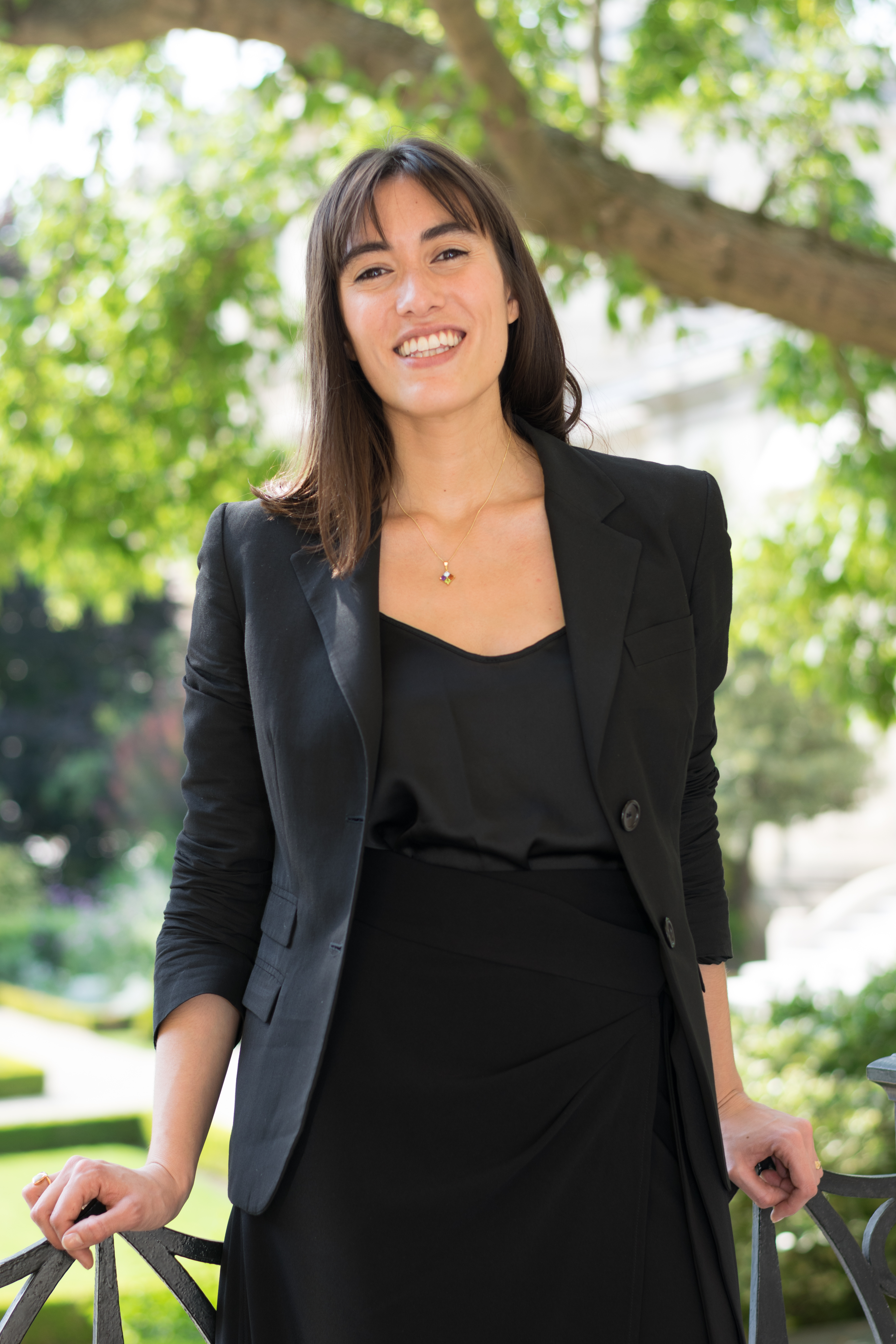
Paula Forteza

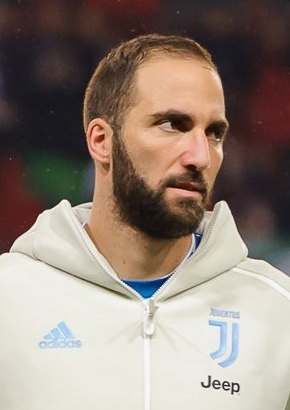
Gonzalo Higuaín

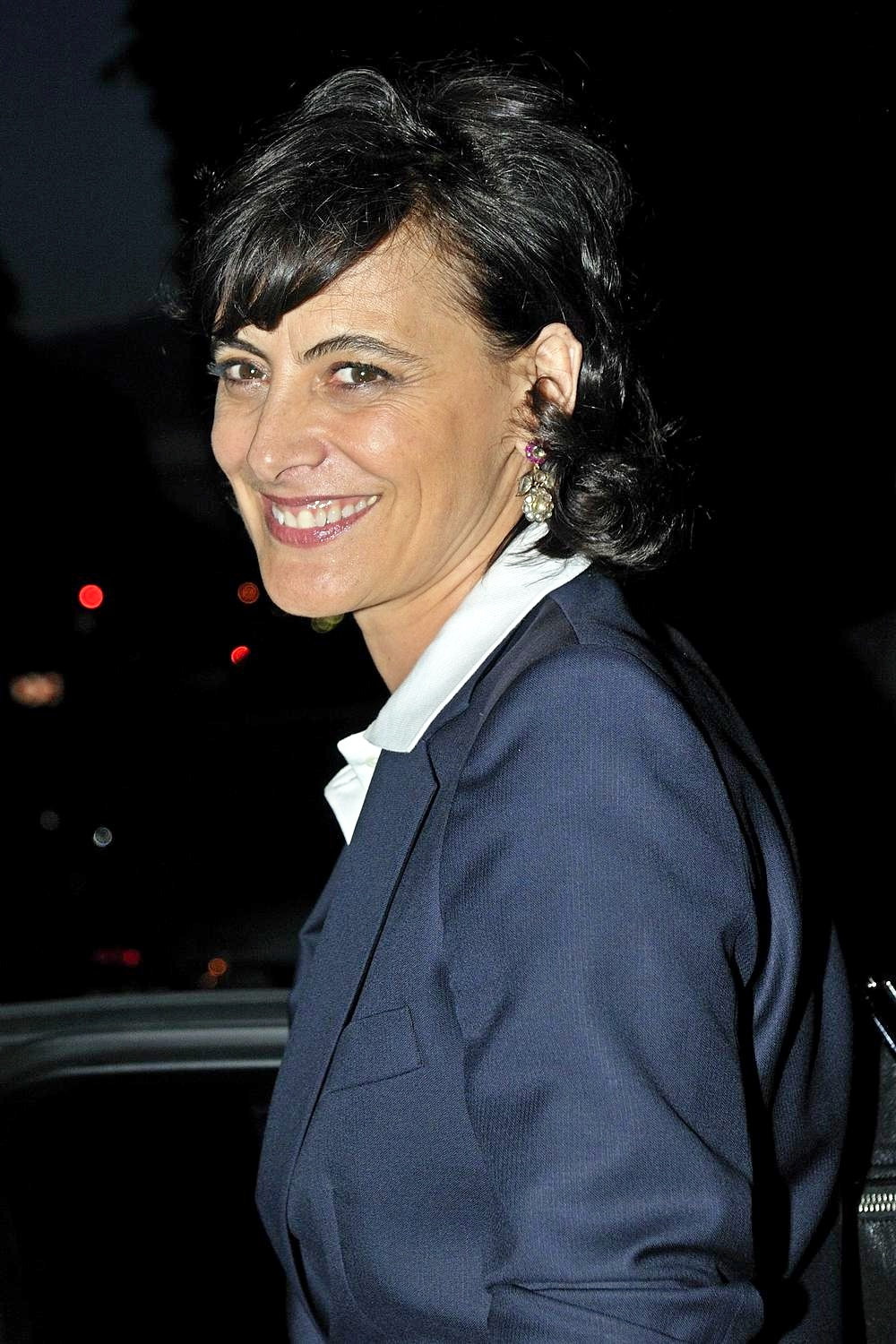
Inès de la Fressange

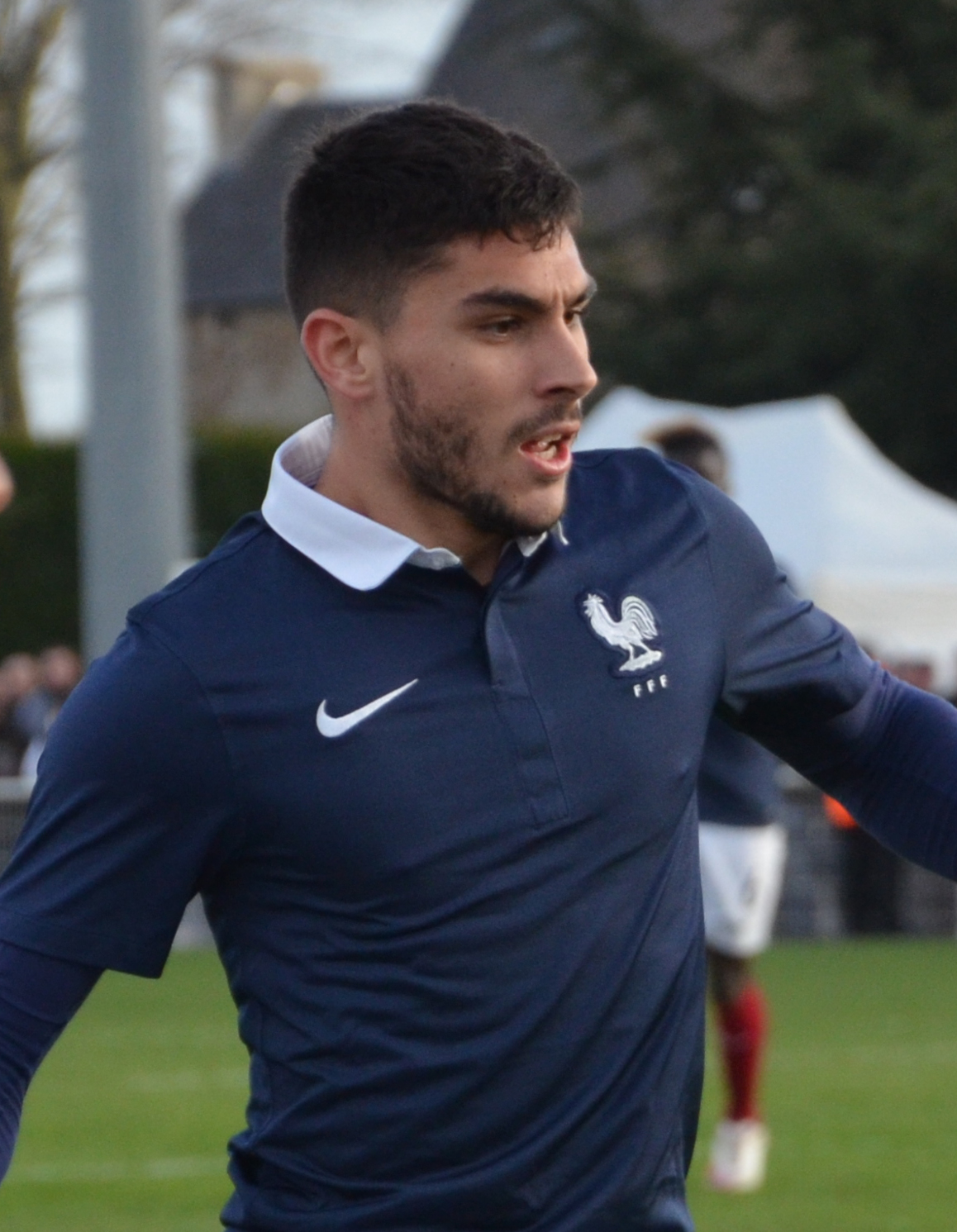
Neal Maupay

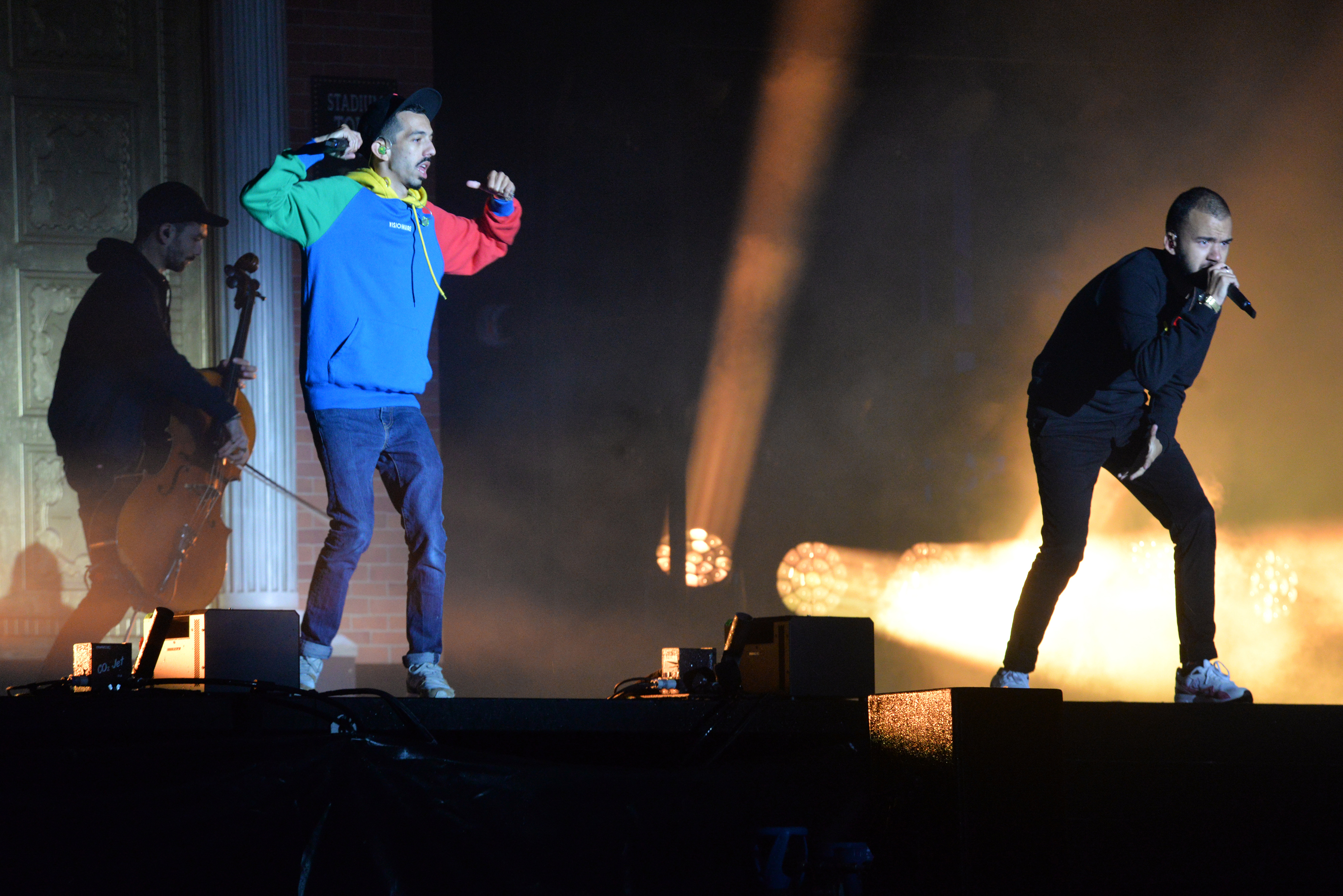
Bigflo & Oli

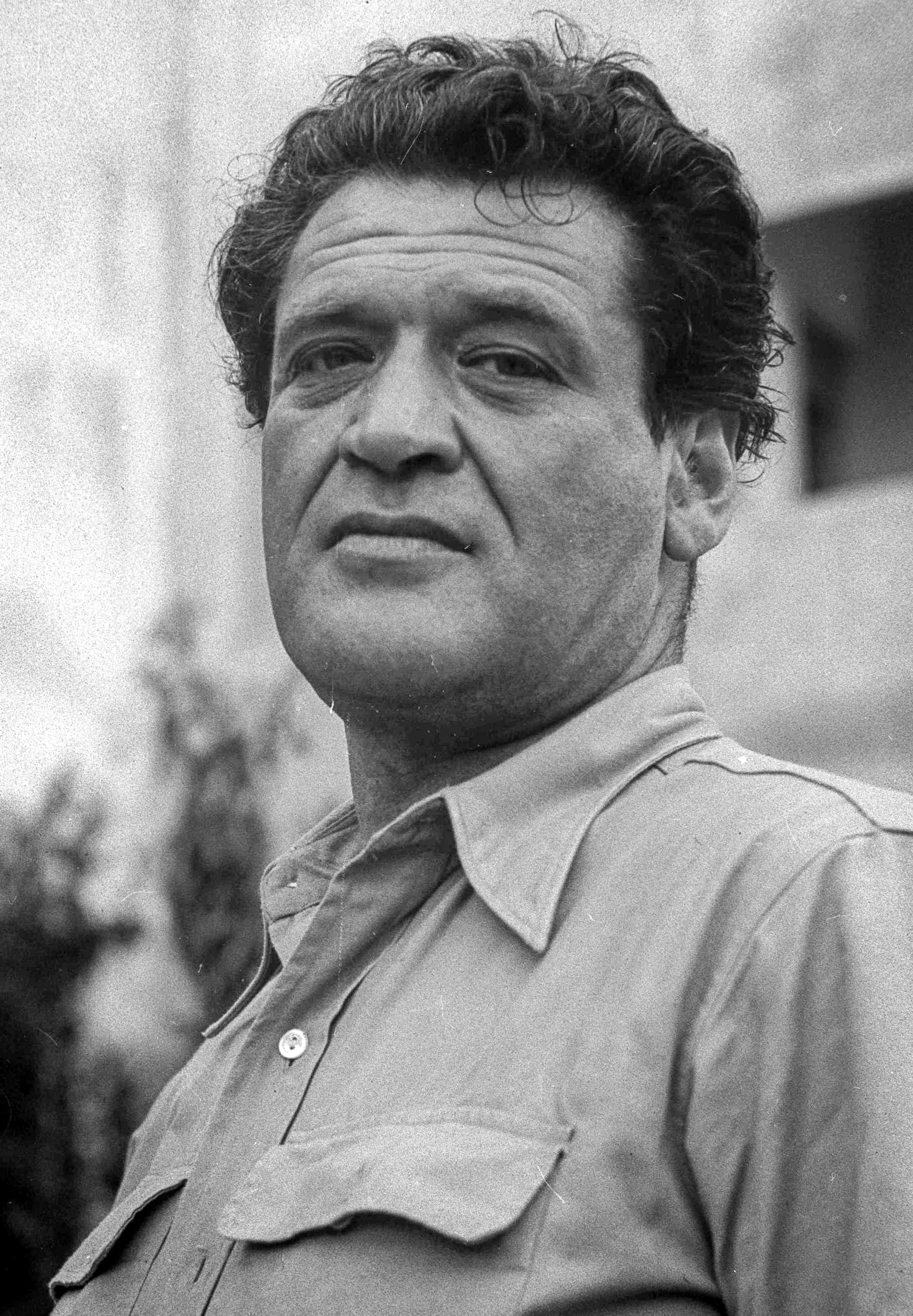
Joseph Kessel

== See also ==
- Argentina–France relations
- French Argentine
- Immigration to France
- Uruguayans in France
