= Argentina–France relations =

- Argentina: France

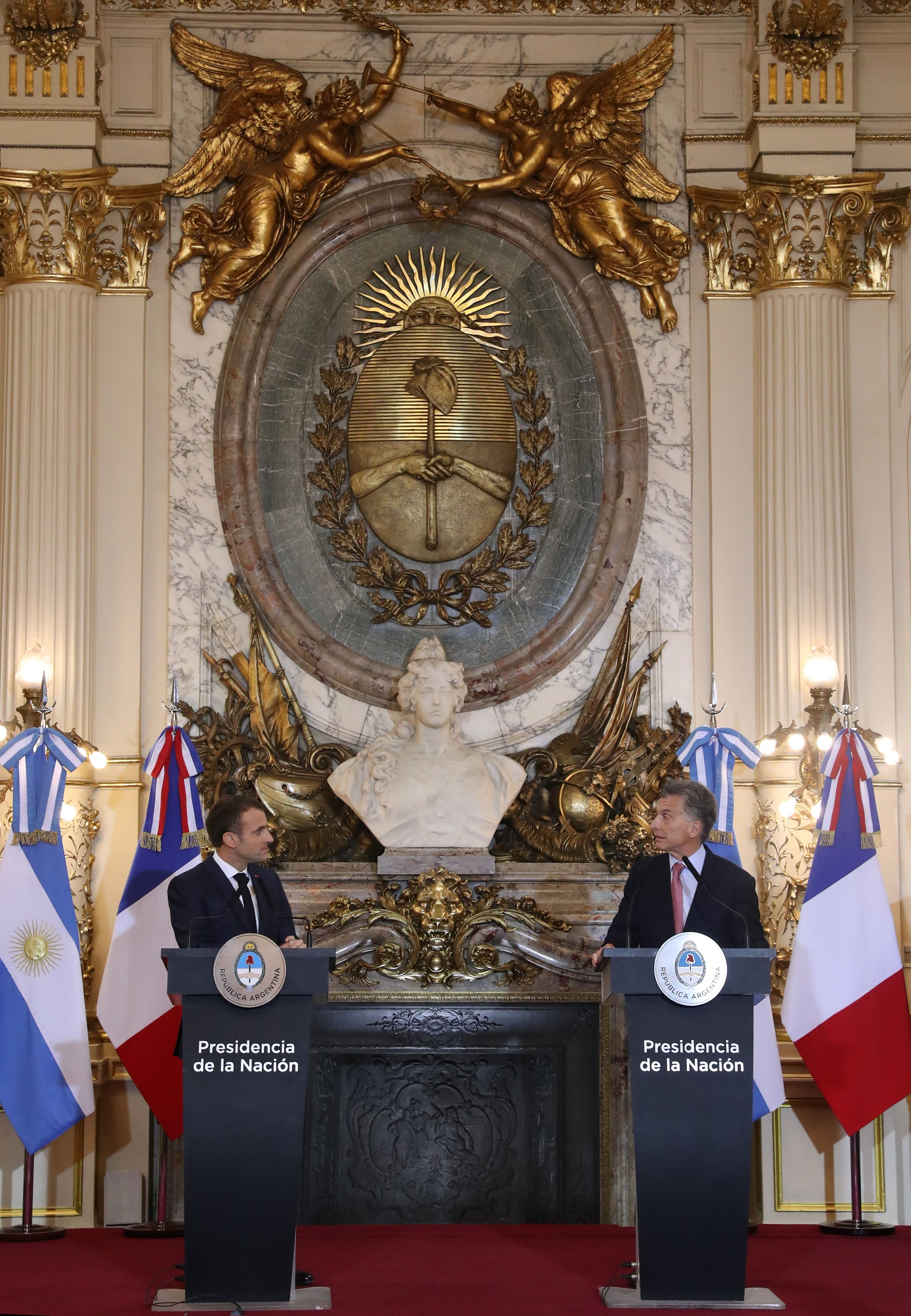
President Mauricio Macri and President Emmanuel Macron in Buenos Aires, 2018.

Foreign relations between Argentina and France, have existed nearly a century. Both states are members of the G-20.

Argentina became an independent nation during the Peninsular War, a conflict between the First French Empire and the Spanish Empire. Argentina was a Spanish territory by that time, as the Viceroyalty of the Río de la Plata, and thus at war with France, but the war never left Europe. The Viceroyalty was never attacked directly by French armies. The French attack to Spain indirectly started the Argentine War of Independence. France recognized Argentina as an independent nation by the end of 1830.

France attempted the French blockade of the Río de la Plata during the War of the Confederation, attempting to remove Juan Manuel de Rosas from power. The blockade lasted for some more years after the defeat of the Peru–Bolivian Confederation by Argentina and Chile. France would attempt another blockade, this time allied with Britain, but Rosas defeated it as well.

== History ==
=== 19th century ===
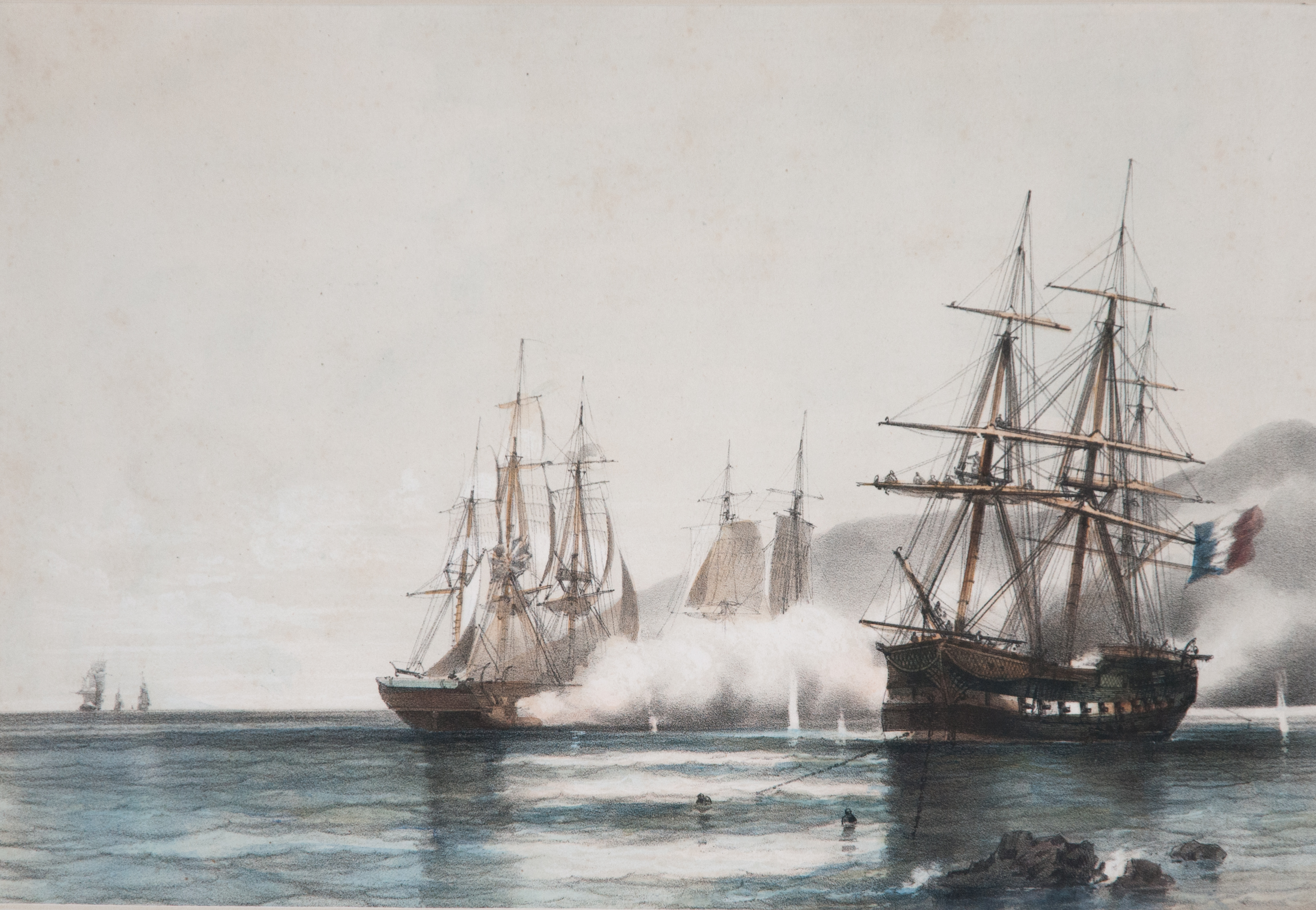
Battle of Vuelta de Obligado.

Relations between France and Argentina are rooted in this country's independence, proclaimed on July 9, 1816 at the Congress of Tucuman, the French political ideals of the Enlightenment were inspiring movement, born in Buenos Aires on May 25, 1810. Later in the same century, ties between the two countries are strengthened by the influx of French to Argentina, which attracts nearly 250,000 people between 1880 and 1910, mostly Basques, Béarn and aveyroneses migrants. At the same time, France is a model to Argentina for its implementation in many areas, particularly in the area of law (influence of the Civil Code), education, college, science and medicine.

The history of Argentina is so intimately linked to that of France from its origins: a highly symbolic way, the liberator José de San Martín lived much longer in France than in Argentina, and spent many years in exile in Paris and the Paris region (Grand Bourg) before ending his days in Boulogne-sur-Mer, where he died on August 17, 1850.

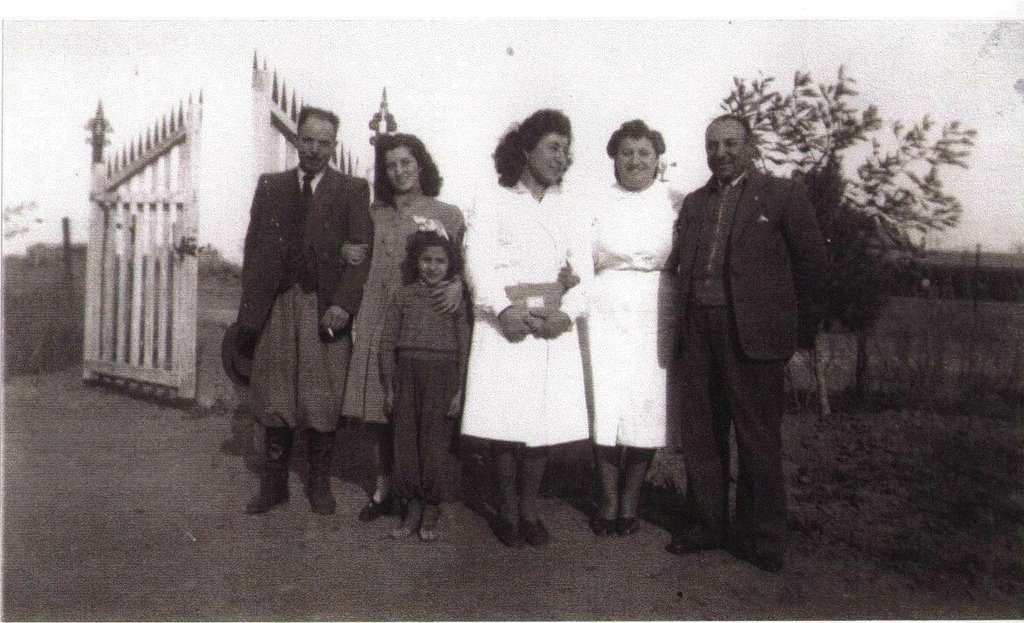
French immigrants in Bahía Blanca, 1940

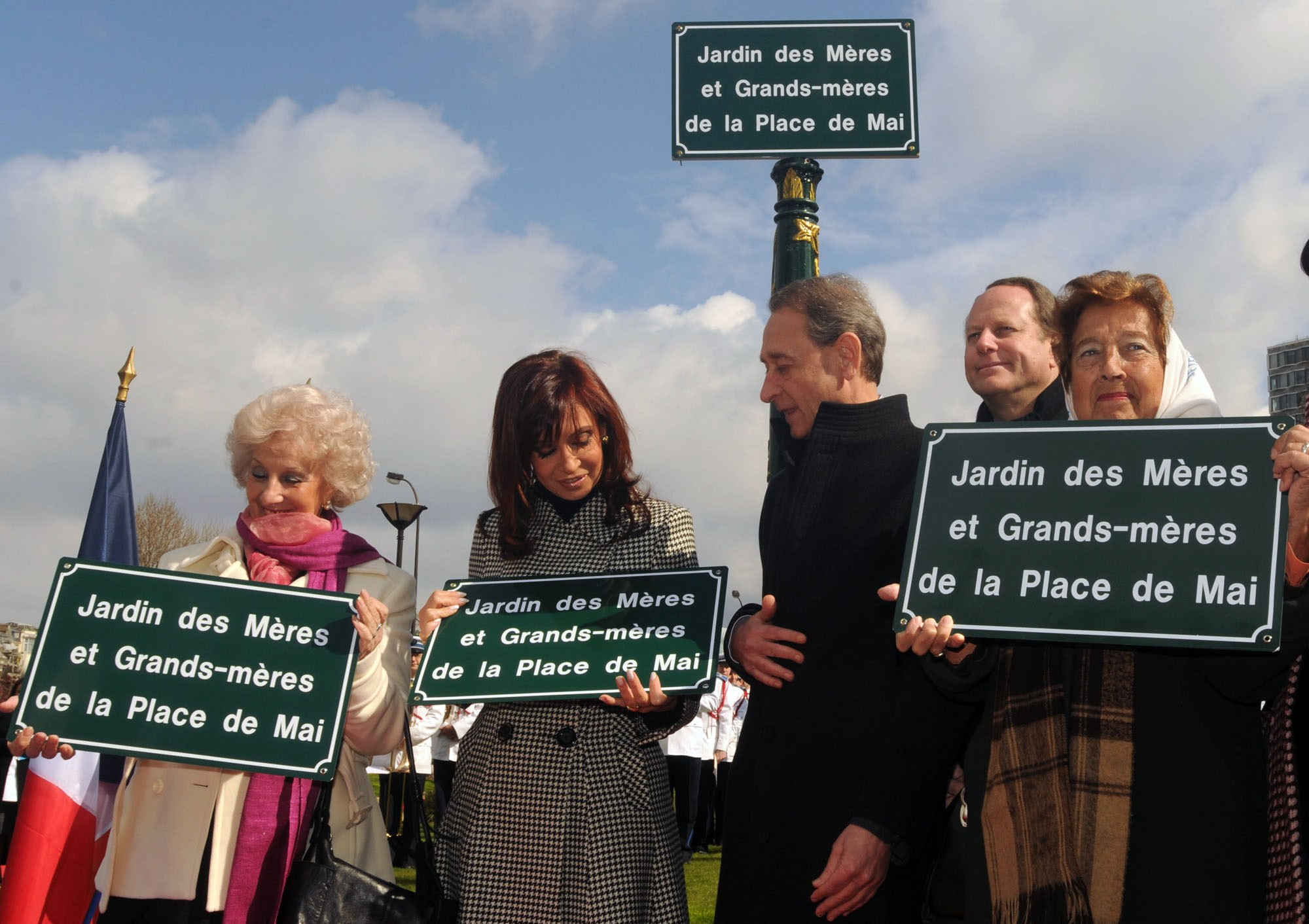
Inauguration of the Garden of Mothers and Grandmothers of the Plaza de Mayo in Paris.

Throughout these two centuries, a unique relationship will build between France and Argentina, whose amplitude can be illustrated by the diversity and intensity of the exchanges between the two countries: education, science, arts, economics and construction of large infrastructures. "Golden Years" (1880–1930), who see big names in architecture, as Paul Parter, René Sergent or Norbert Maillart, build some of the most beautiful buildings in the city, are translated with a strong influence of French taste of the time, which deeply marked the landscape of Buenos Aires. The aristocracy of the "breadbasket of the world" had very strong ties to France for their thinking and their way of life. Buenos Aires won this well-deserved title of "Paris of Latin America."

=== 20th century ===
The first wave of Frenchs who arrived in the country came mostly from the southern regions of Aquitaine and the Pyrenees. They embarked in Bordeaux to America. The French Basques also constituted a numerically important group. While most French immigrants were integrated into urban life in Buenos Aires and major cities of the country, there were also agricultural colonization projects. The most important took place in Pigüé (southwest of the province of Buenos Aires) and Chaco Province (Mayday departments and Bermejo). There were French settlers, along with Germans and Swiss, in the Esperanza colony, founded in 1865 by Aaron Castellanos. Another group of French immigrants settled in Oberá, Misiones.

France helped the Argentine government carry out the Dirty War, playing a significant role in Argentina's state terrorism and systematic torture of political dissidents.

=== 21st century ===
Bilateral exchanges reached 1.7 billion euros in 2013. Capital goods account for 60% of French exports in Argentina, and products related to the automotive sector more than a third. Imports of Argentine products in France totaled 463 million euros in 2013. These are highly concentrated in the products of agriculture and food industries (more than 80% of the total, or 373 million euros in 2013). The surplus in the trade balance of France amounted to 774 million euros in 2013. France was, in 2013, the sixth supplier of Argentina. With a stock of FDI (Foreign Direct Investment) of 2.4 million euros in 2012, France is one of the first investors in Argentina and implanted 250 French companies and groups active in the Argentine growth. This is particularly noticeable in the automotive sector (30% of the French market for both Renault and PSA), wholesale distribution (40% market share), the food industry (Danone and Bongrain) or energy (gas for Total, Schneider Electric) equipment. Argentina the 3rd regional destination for the French exports, behind Brazil and Mexico, but ahead of Chile and, in total, our third trade partner.

== Cultural relations ==
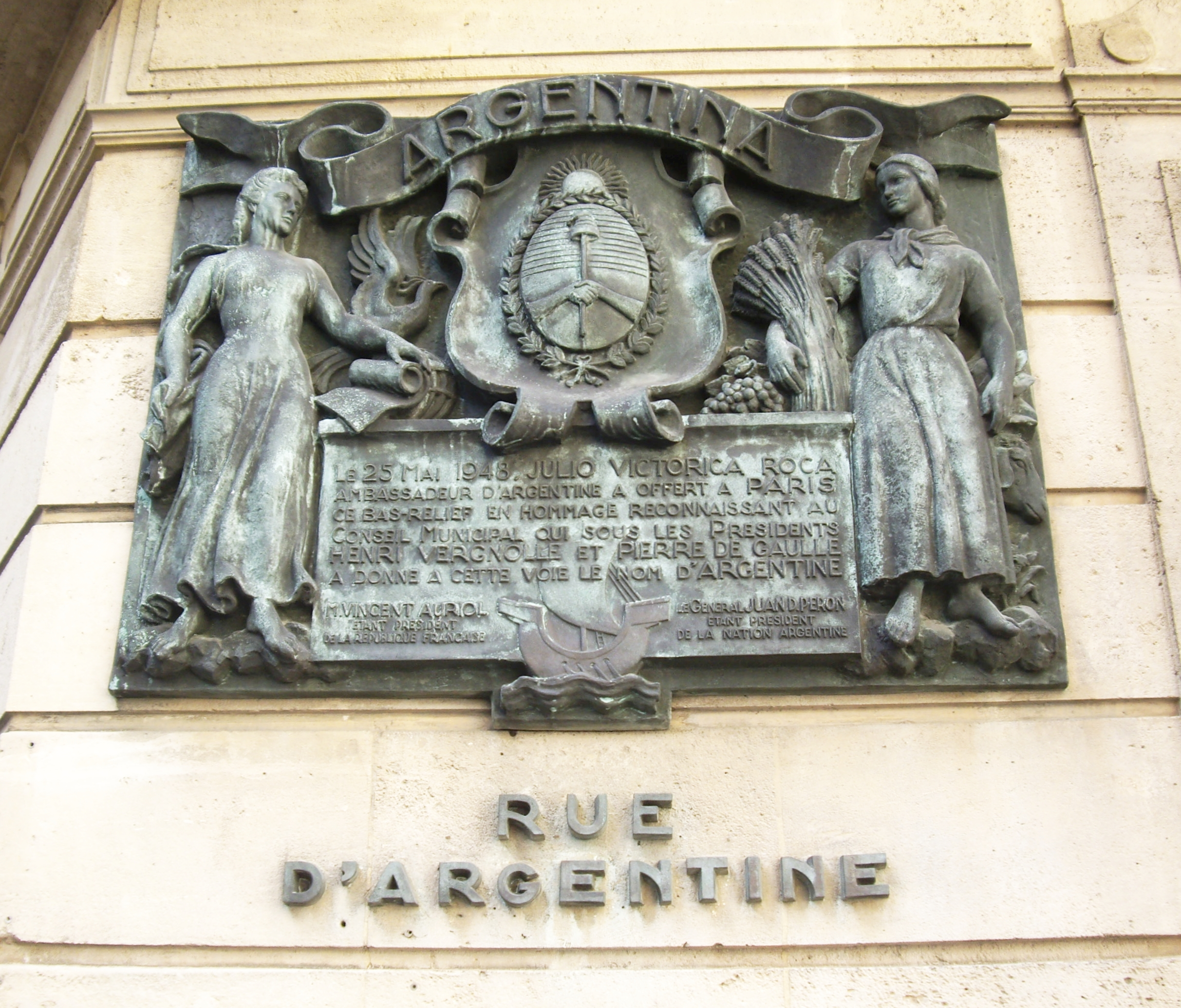
Rue d'Argentine in Paris.

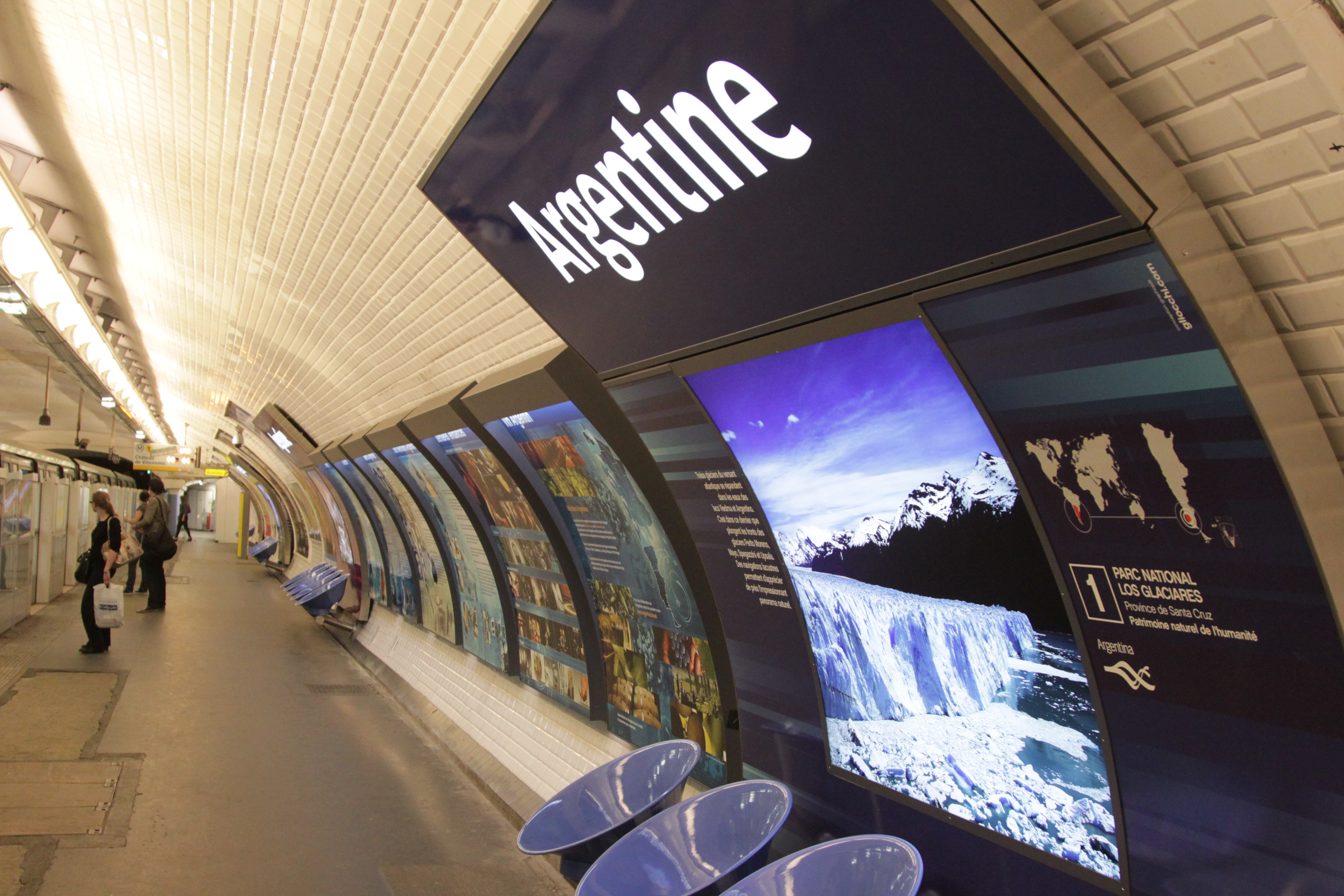
Argentine Station, Paris Métro Line 1.

French immigrants contributed outstanding features to the Argentina culture, especially in the resumption of the production of yerba mate, wine production, sugar (Hileret). Santiago de Liniers, one of the great heroes of Argentina's history, was French. Three Argentine presidents were of French origin: Juan Martín de Pueyrredón, Carlos Pellegrini and Hipolito Yrigoyen; while Alejandro Agustín Lanusse was a great-grandson of an important entrepreneur from Aquitaine. Institutions of the French community, including the French Hospital (French Hospital of Buenos Aires in 2013 has been renamed as César Milstein Hospital), still active, and the socialist group Les Egaux, one of the founders of the Argentine labor movement.

French immigrants as Amadeo Jacques and Paul Groussac had a direct impact on education and Argentine culture. Some Argentine cities, such as Pigüé above, were originated by colonies of French immigrants, and generated an Argentine-French local culture. Carlos Gardel was a native of Languedoc and Provence, the eastern tip of Occitania, became the liberator Hipólito Bouchard who spread the design of the Argentina flag Central America and captured the realistic teaches at the Battle of San Lorenzo.

=== Architecture ===
Buenos Aires is a city of diverse architectural influences, especially from Italy, Spain and France. The Parisian flair of Buenos Aires in the San Martín Palace, located on 761 Arenales Street, inspired in the French architecture of the 18th century:

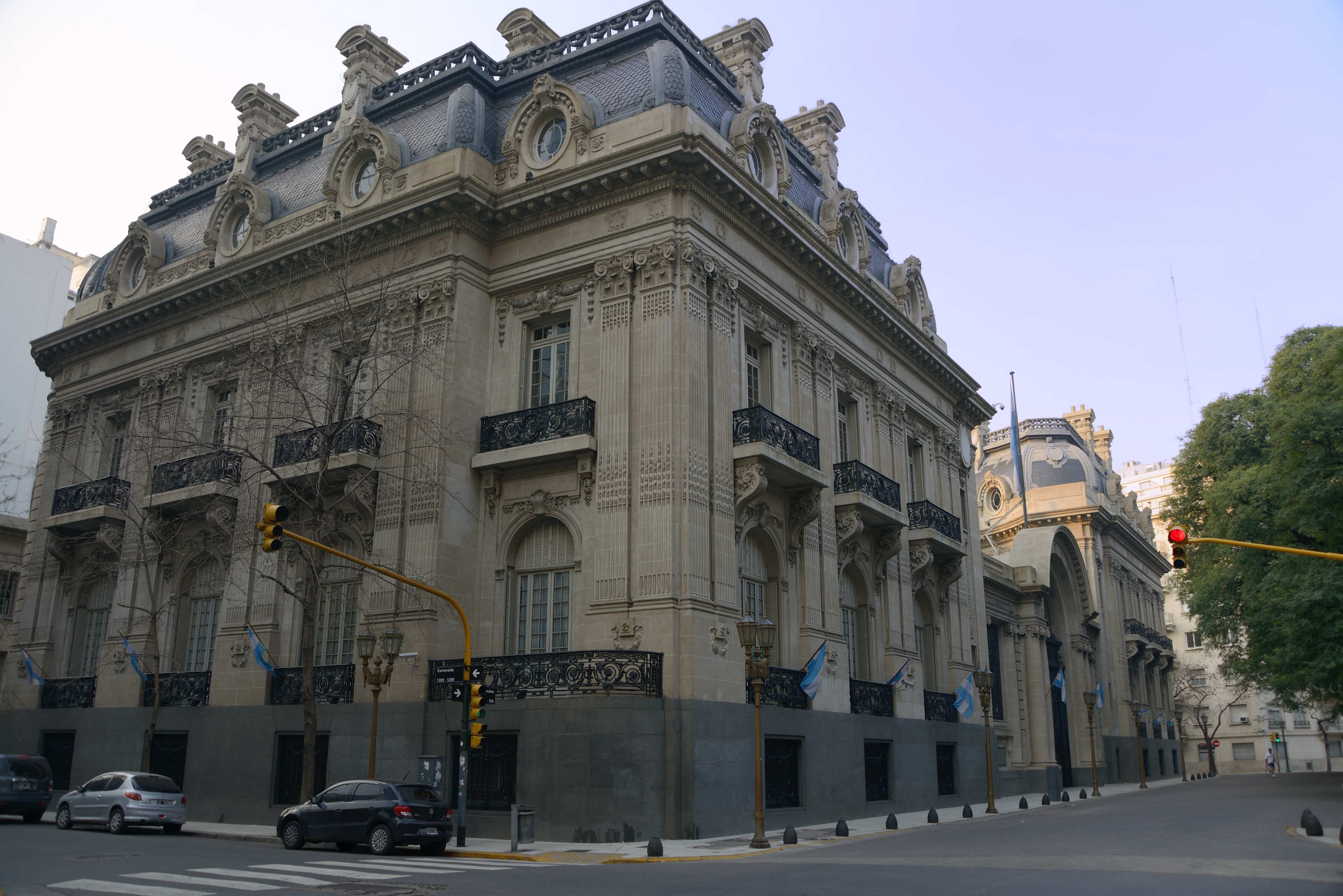
San Martín Palace of Beaux-Arts architecture.

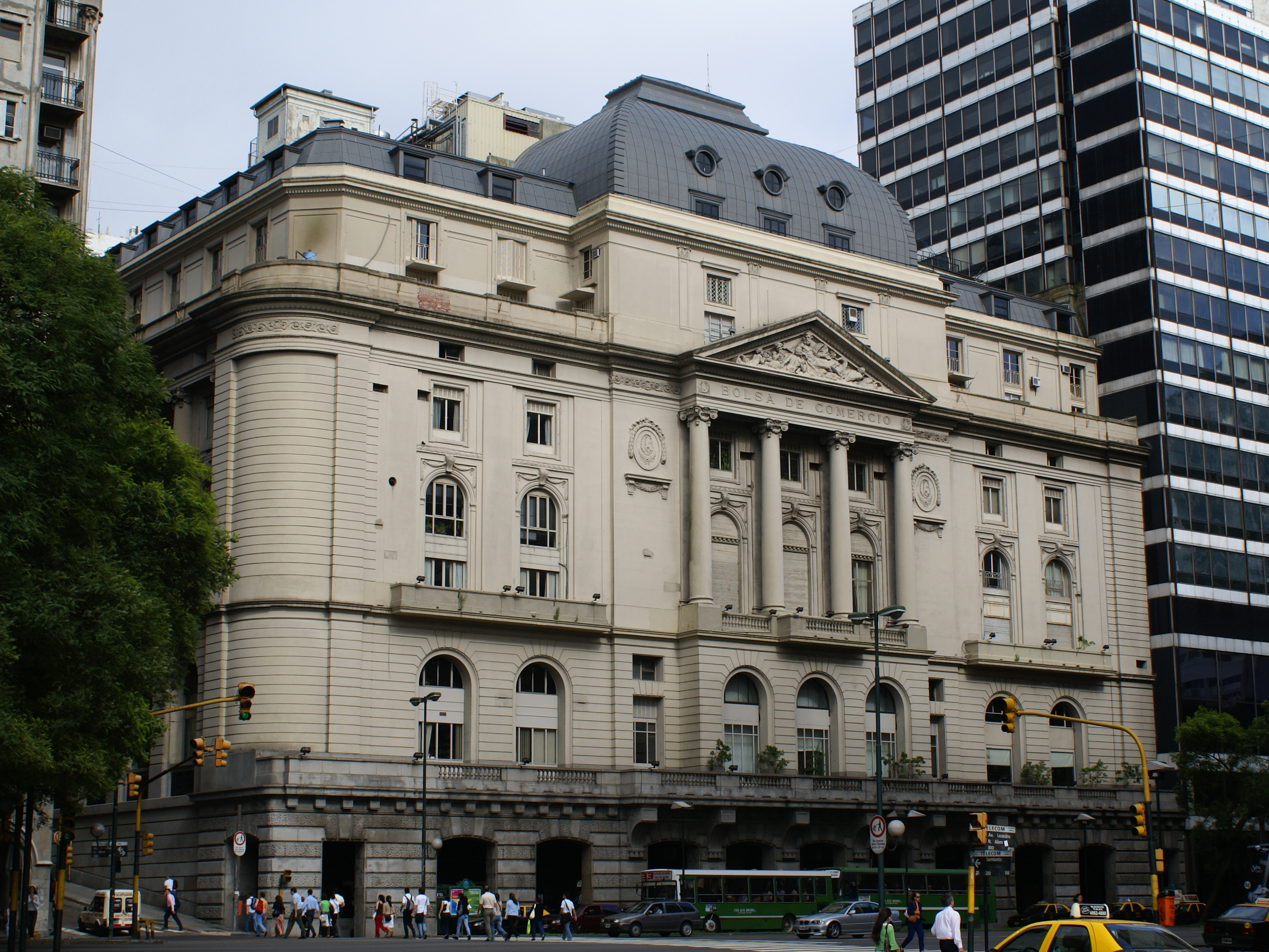
The Buenos Aires Stock Exchange

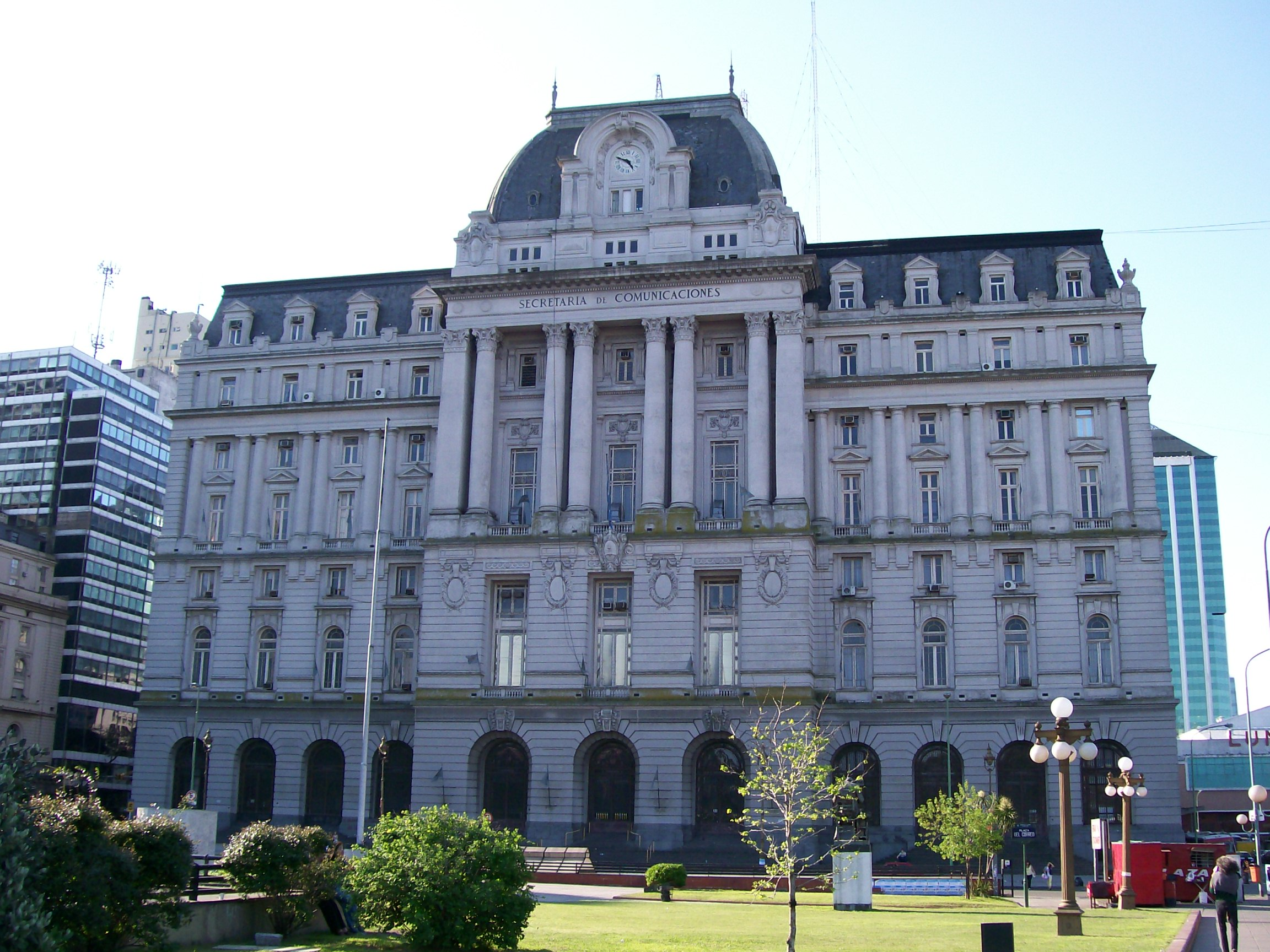
The CCK, designed by French architect Norbert Maillart in 1889

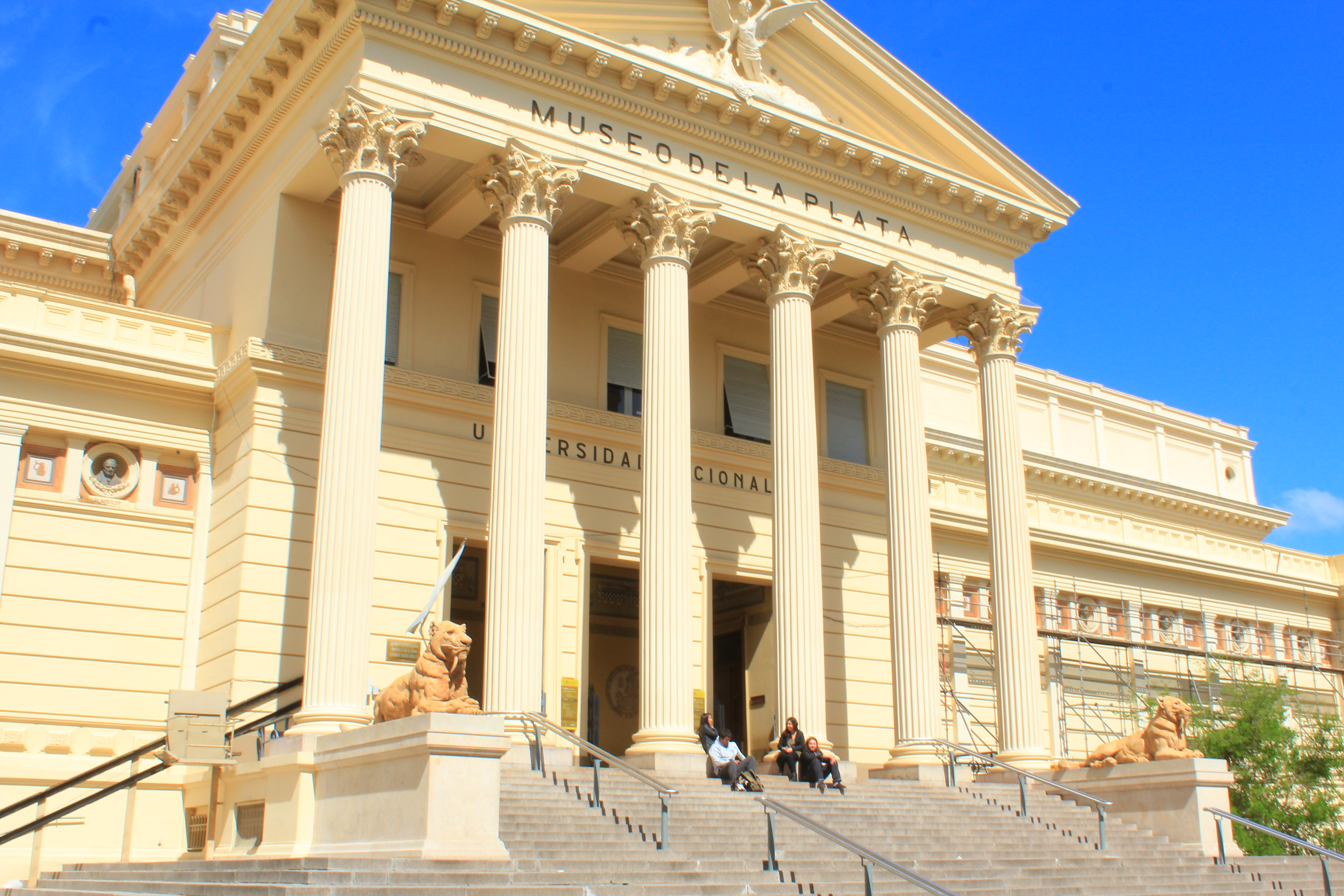
La Plata Museum of Neoclassical architecture

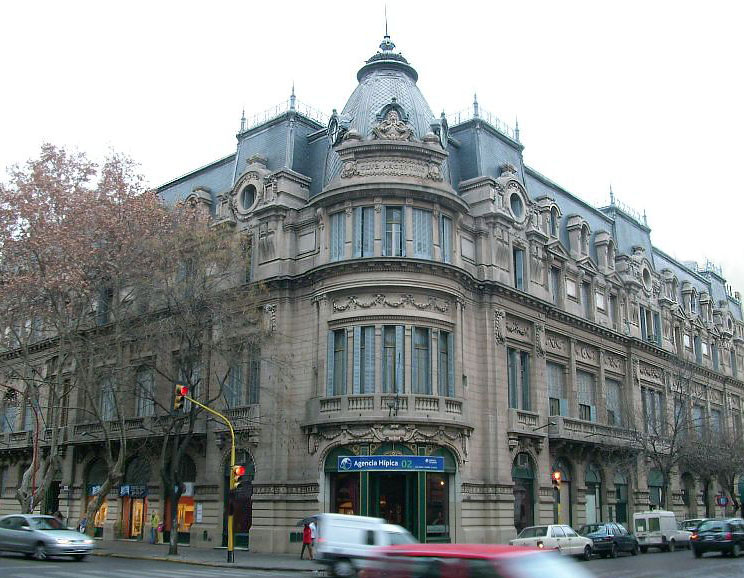
Club Argentino in Bahia Blanca.

=== Lunfardo ===
Lunfardo is an argot of the Spanish language which appeared in Buenos Aires at the end of the 19th century. It integrated a lot of words and expressions from languages and dialects spoken by immigrants, notably Italians, Spaniards and French. Lunfardo was heavily used in tango lyrics. After 1912, as tango became popular in Paris, French expressions were incorporated into tango lyrics and made their way into lunfardo. It has now become an integral part of the Spanish spoken in Argentina and some of these words are still used on a daily basis.

==== Examples ====
- Beguén - Crush (from the French béguin -crush-)
- Bulín - Digs (from the French boulin -hole in the wall of a dolecote where the pigeons nest-)
- Buyón - Food (from the French bouillon -broth-)
- Calotear - To steal (from the French calotter -to steal-)
- Dragonear - To flirt (from the French draguer -to flirt-)
- Fané - Worn out (from the French fané -withered-)
- Franelear - To caress, to heavy pet (from the French faire flanelle -to go to a whorehouse without making use of any woman-)
- Macro - Pimp (from the French maquereau -pimp-)
- Marote - Head (from the French marotte -hatstand-)
- Ragú - Hunger (from the French ragoût -stew-)
- Toilette - Bathroom (from the French toilettes -bathroom-)

=== Notable people ===
Cultural, scientific, technical and academic cooperation between France and Argentina are part of a long tradition of exchanges. The crisis of 2001 changed however, the possibilities of intervention and collaboration and has led to a redefinition of priorities for our action. She is oriented towards the technical, scientific and university cooperation, without thereby be neglected our artistic and audiovisual cooperation. It is for us to follow the evolution of the country, offering our experience, our creativity, our contributions to the great debates and promoting synergies.

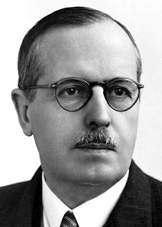
Nobel Prize in Medicine Winner, Bernardo Houssay

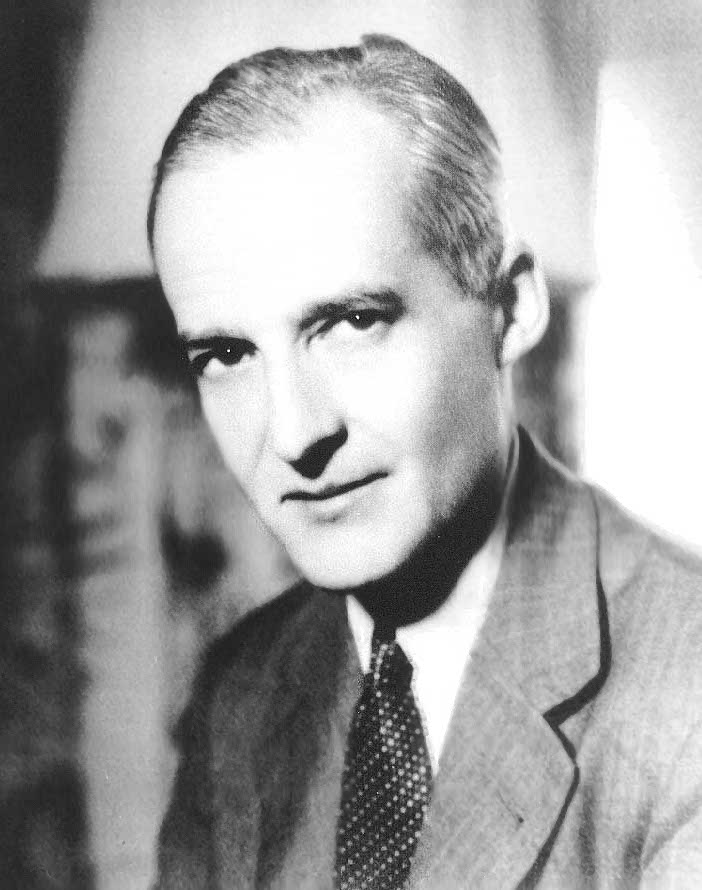
Nobel Prize in Chemistry Winner, Luis Federico Leloir

==== Science ====
- Enrique Hermitte, Argentine engineer
- Bernardo Houssay, Argentine physiologist, to French parents, Nobel Prize winner
- Luis Federico Leloir, Argentine doctor and biochemist, Nobel Prize winner
- Alicia Moreau de Justo, Argentine physician, French parents

==== Literature ====
- Carlos Alvarado-Larroucau, writer
- Augusto Belin, writer, French father
- Adolfo Bioy Casares, writer
- Eugenio Cambaceres, writer, French father
- Andrés Chabrillón, poet, French parents
- Julio Cortázar, Argentine writer, French Argentine mother
- Emilio Daireaux, French-Argentine writer and journalist
- Paul Groussac, writer, literary critic, historian and librarian
- José Hernández, writer, French Argentine mother
- Arturo Jauretche, writer of French Basque ancestry
- Federico Jeanmaire, writer
- Gregorio de Laferrère, playwright
- Ana Emilia Lahitte, writer
- Leopoldo Marechal, Argentine writer, French Uruguayan father
- Julio Meinvielle, priest and writer
- Ulyses Petit de Murat, poet and screenwriter
- Manuel Peyrou, writer

=== Academia ===
- Amédée Jacques, French-born Argentine pedagogue and philosopher
- Ernesto Laclau, political theorist

== Resident diplomatic missions ==
- Argentina has an embassy in Paris.
- France has an embassy in Buenos Aires.
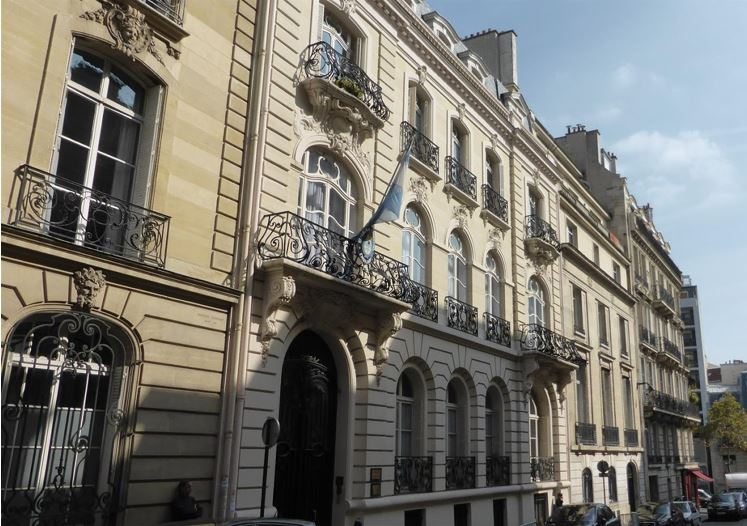
Embassy of Argentina, Paris.

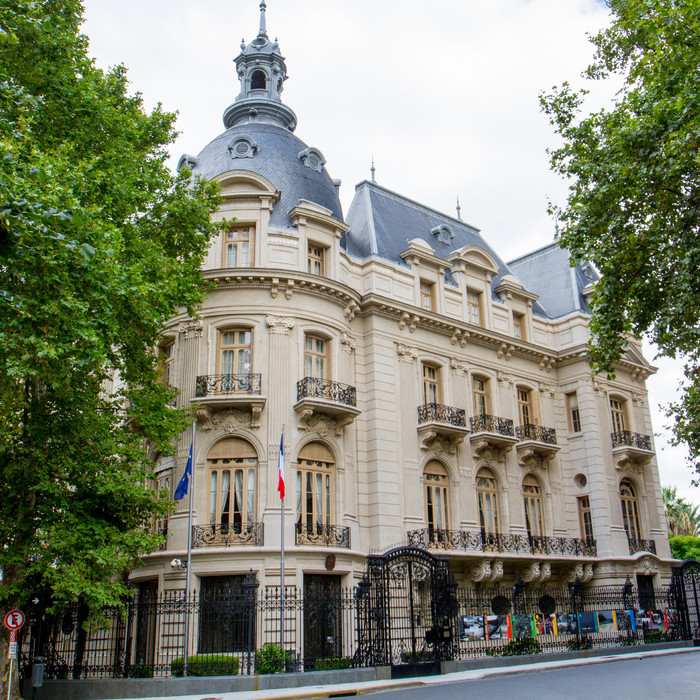
Embassy of France, Buenos Aires

== See also ==
- Argentines in France
- French Argentines
- 2022 FIFA World Cup Final
- Argentina–European Union relations

== Bibliography ==
- Abad de Santillán, Diego. Historia Argentina (in Spanish). Buenos Aires: TEA (Tipográfica Editora Argentina).
