= René du Broutet =

René du Breuil du Bost du Broutet, French knight (baronet), count of Gargilesse, also known as "du Broutet", was an aristocrat and senior officer in the French Army of the Ancien Régime, born around 1570, died around 1640. He distinguished himself in the Wars of Religion for Henri IV against the Catholic League and against the pirate Barberoussette. Then he became the first royal governor of the fort of Brescou, hence his military quarrel with Henri II de Montmorency (1618).

== Coat of arms ==
Per pale, 1st: Gules an antique axe Argent, which is du Breuil; 2nd: Azure a chevron Or with three acorns Or, which is du Bost. Stamp: a helmet with white plume (knight of Henri IV). Chaix d'Est Ange mentions that the so called "antique axe" is typical of this family with no other heraldic instance found in France.

== Origins ==
René is the heir of two noble chivalric houses (baronets) of Bas-Berry (Indre). The knights du Breuil have been known since 1399; the knights of Bost date back to the XVth century. His maternal grandfather, the knight du Bost, made him his universal heir, with the obligation to bear his name and coat of arms. In 1609 he thus became du Breuil du Bost, and remains known, like his son and other descendants, as the Sire (lord) du Broutet, after his main fief, the Castle of (Petit) Broutet.

== Military career ==
He was part of the army of Henri IV commanded by the Duke and Constable Henri I de Montmorency against the Ligueurs of the Duke of Joyeuse in Languedoc, around Béziers and Narbonne.

On 29 May 1590 René du Broutet was sent by the Constable against the Nauplius-like pirate Barberoussette (alias Gaspard Dot) whom he captured and forced to surrender the rock of Brescou. As a reward, the Constable made René du Broutet the governor, for King Henri IV, of the new fort of Brescou, which was then a major strategic location. Du Broutet thus became one of the main lords of the Midi.

He put down roots in the area by marrying the illustrious Anne de Girard de Coulondres, a descendant of the state councillors of Béziers (16th century) and, earlier, of Girard de Bazoges, ambassador of Charles VII at the end of the Hundred Years' War.

== Fighting against Henri II de Montmorency ==
In 1618, on the death of Concini, unrest broke out in the Midi: the Constable's son, Henri II de Montmorency, sought to give the fort of Brescou to his favourite, the Marquis de Portès, who already commanded the fort of Agde, opposite Brescou. René du Broutet and especially his wife Anne and the Girard family refused to give in to Henri's pressure. So Montmorency went on the attack. He tried to capture du Broutet at Notre-Dame de Grau in November 1618. But du Broutet was warned in time and fled on a boat on the Hérault from where he returned to his fortress. Montmorency then had 800 cannon shots fired at Brescou from Roquelongue and Agde, but only 18 were successful. René and Anne refused to leave their fortress and endured a month of siege.

In Paris, the Duke of Luynes was warned and took advantage of this heroic resistance to destabilise his enemy Montmorency. He obtained from King Louis XIII to send an exempt from the Gardes du Corps, M. de Lavaur, who came to receive the fort from René du Broutet and handed it over to Montmorency, but in exchange for a colossal indemnity to the governor: 200,000 livres (around 9 million euros) voted by the States of Languedoc.

== Return to the Bas-Berry ==
The former governor of Brescou and his wife returned to Berry. René obtained the lordship of Gargilesse and the title of Count of Gargilesse (1620).

== Descendants ==
- Charles du Breuil du Bost du Broutet, Count of Gargilesse, his son, hero of the Fronde, cavalry master-of-camp of the Prince de Condé, Page of H.H. Gaston d'Orléans.1
- Etienne II du Breuil du Bost du Broutet, his great-grandson, Garde du Corps of king Louis XV4
- The de la Cotardière family1 and others.
