= L'esquisse =

Studio album by Keny Arkana
- Released: 1 April 2005
- Genre: French hip hop, political hip hop
- Label: La Callita

Keny Arkana chronology
Le missile est lancé (2004)	L'esquisse (2005)	La rage (2006)

L'esquisse is a 2005 studio album by Argentinian-French rapper Keny Arkana.

== Track listing ==
1. "Le Missile Est Lancé" 3:53
2. "Venez Voir" 3:17
3. "Le Temps Passe Et S'Écoule" 3:16
4. "Ca Nous Correspond Pas" 7:31
5. "Le Rap A Perdu Ses Esprits" 4:10
6. "Faut Qu'On S'En Sorte" 3:05
7. "Style Libre" 5:57
8. "J'Ai Besoin D'Air" 3:37
9. "Tout Le Monde Debout" 3:26
10. "Jeunesse De L'Occident" 2:10
11. "La Main Sur Le Coeur" 2:29
12. "Dur D'Être Optimiste" 3:04
13. "J'Lève Ma Rime" 4:01
14. "De L'Opéra À La Plaine" 7:38
15. "Outro" 3:44
16. "Medley" L'Usine À Adulte / Les Murs De Ma Ville Rmx 3:17

== Charts ==
Chart (2007)	Peak position
French Albums (SNEP)	102
