= Pauline Croze =

French pop/folk singer and musician

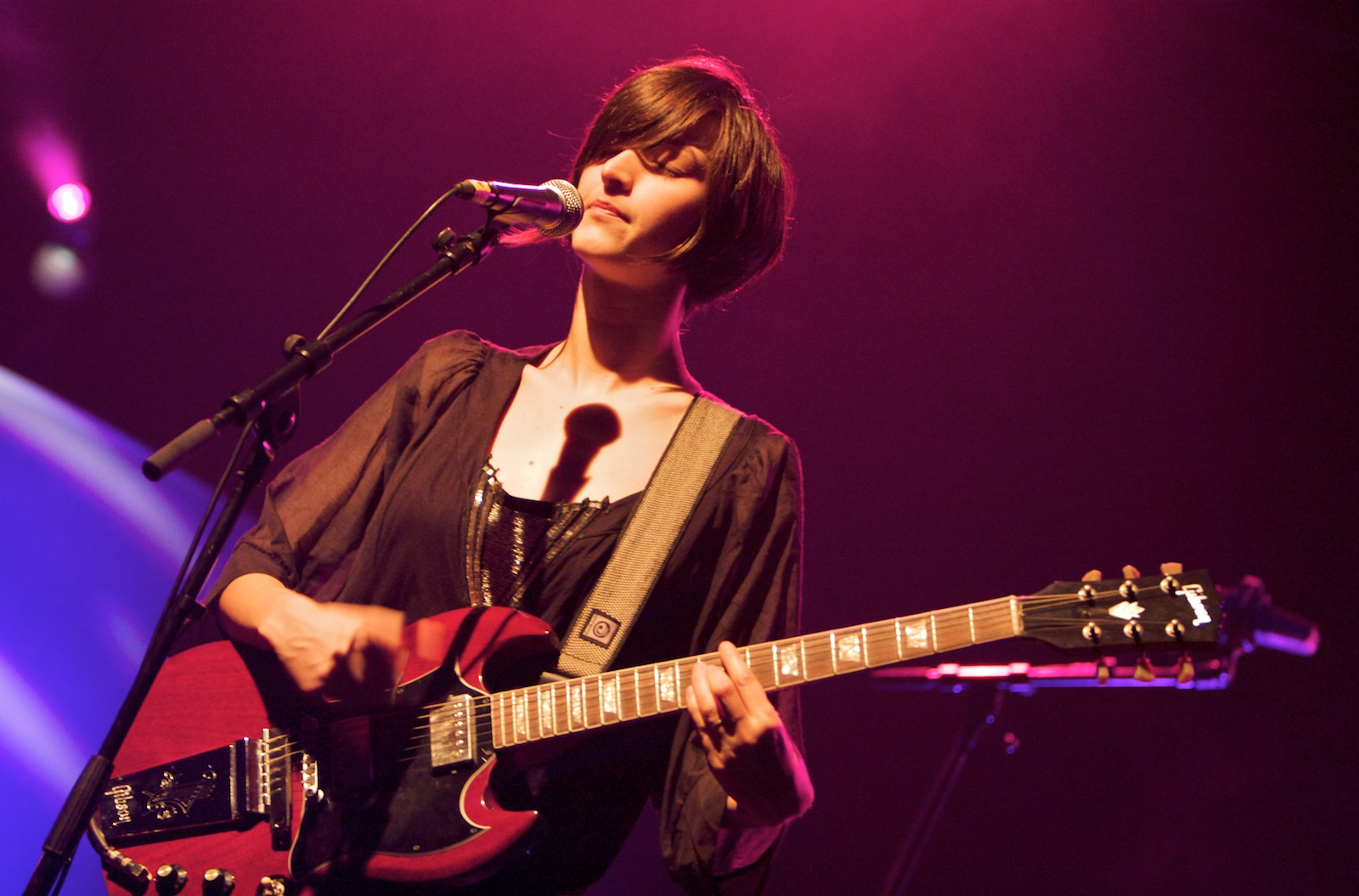

Background information
- Born: 4 May 1979 (age 47); Noisy-le-Sec, France
- Genres: Pop; folk
- Occupations: Singer; musician
- Instrument: Guitar
- Years active: 2005-present
- Website: https://www.paulinecroze.com/

Pauline Croze (born 4 May 1979, in Noisy-le-Sec) is a French pop/folk singer and musician.

She started to sing and play the guitar when she was fourteen and six years later she made her first demos with Quito of the group Señor Holmes. At this time she made her very first appearance on stage.

In 2003, she collaborated with Anne Claverie and Édith Fambuena of the Valentins in Transmusicales de Rennes, a work for which she is very well known.

She played as the support of Miossec, -M-, Bernard Lavilliers, Cali, Tryo or Lhasa.

In 2011, she collaborated with fellow French musician, Ben Mazué on his single, C'est léger, from his debut album.

Her first album Pauline Croze was released in February 2005, followed by Un bruit qui court in 2007. Her third album, Le prix de l'Eden was released on 22 October 2012. She released Bossa nova in 2016.

== Discography ==
=== Studio albums ===
Title	Album details	Peak chart positions	
Title	Album details	FRA	BEL (Wa)
Pauline Croze	Released: February 2005; Label: Wagram	35	98
Un bruit qui court	Released: November 2007; Label: Wagram	24	100
Le prix de l'Eden	Released: November 2012; Label: Wagram, Cinq7	75	150
Bossa nova	Released: May 2016; Label: Un Plan Simple	59	140
Ne rien faire	Released: February 2018; Label: Believe	134	—
Après les heures grises	Released: October 2021; Label: Vilmamusica	—	—
"—" denotes a recording that did not chart.
