= Menteur =

Studio album by Cali
- Released: 2005
- Genre: Pop

Menteur is the second album of the French singer Cali, released October 10, 2005. All songs are written and sung by Cali with the exception of track 12 (Bruno Caliciuri and Julien Lebart). The protest album deals with the topics of abuse, individual rights, and the emotions of all parties involved.

== Track listings ==
No.	Title	Length
1.	"Qui se soucie de moi"	3:30
2.	"Je m'en vais (après Miossec)"	3:51
3.	"Pauvre garçon (with Daniel Darc)"	5:08
4.	"Pour Jane"	3:07
5.	"Je sais"	4:39
6.	"Je ne vivrai pas sans toi"	3:43
7.	"Roberta"	6:42
8.	"Menteur"	4:42
9.	"Tes yeux"	4:50
10.	"La fin du monde pour dans dix minutes"	4:13
11.	"Je te souhaite à mon pire ennemi"	4:22
12.	"Le vrai père"	5:26

== Sources ==
This article uses information from the French language website Musilac.
