= Uruguayans in France =

Ethnic group in France

Total population
- Total population of Uruguayan born 2,784 (2019)

Regions with significant populations
- Ajaccio, Aquitaine, Brittany, Bordeaux, Cebazat (Clermont-Ferrand), Centre-Val de Loire, Corsica, Dax, Île-de-France, Languedoc-Roussillon, Lille, Limousin, Lower Normandy, Lyon, Marseille, Midi-Pyrénées, Montpellier, Nice, Northeastern France, Orléans, Paris, Pau, Pays de la Loire, Poitou-Charentes, Provence-Alpes-Côte d'Azur, Roubaix, Rouen, Strasbourg, Toulouse, Tours.

Languages
- French, Spanish

Religion
- Roman Catholicism

Related ethnic groups
- Italian, Argentines

Uruguayans in France are people born in Uruguay who emigrated to France.

== Overview ==
French culture has long had a strong influence in Uruguay, with its secondary education and University tailored to the French model. This is a reason why many Uruguayans have found France attractive as a country to pursue higher studies; many of them decided to stay.

During the civic-military dictatorship of Uruguay (1973–1985), some expatriates spent their exile years in France. There are as well a number of French-born people of Uruguayan descent.

Expatriate Uruguayans have their own institutions in France, such as the Consultative Council in Paris.

== Notable people ==
Past

- Juan José Calandria (1902–1980), sculptor
- Justino Serralta (1919–2011), architect
- Héctor Sgarbi (1905–1982), painter

Present

- Carlos Curbelo, footballer
- Gaston Curbelo, footballer
- Elli Medeiros, singer
- Luciano Supervielle, musician
- Daniel Viglietti, musician

== See also ==
- Emigration from Uruguay
- France–Uruguay relations
- French Uruguayan
