= Entre ciment et belle étoile =

Studio album by Keny Arkana
- Released: 17 October 2006
- Genre: French hip hop, political hip hop
- Label: Because Music

Entre ciment et belle étoile (transl. Between cement and stars) is a 2006 studio album by Argentinian-French rapper Keny Arkana.

In 2012 it was awarded a gold certification from the Independent Music Companies Association which indicated sales of at least 75,000 copies throughout Europe.

== Track listing ==
1. "Entre Les Mots : Enfant De La Terre" 1:08
2. "Le Missile Suit Sa Lancée" 3:19
3. "J'Viens De L'Incendie" 4:14
4. "J'Me Barre" 3:29
5. "La Mère Des Enfants Perdus" 3:31
6. "Entre Les Lignes : Clouée Au Sol" 3:21
7. "Eh Connard" 4:01
8. "La Rage" 4:02
9. "Le Fardeau" 5:30
10. "Cueille Ta Vie" 4:10
11. "Nettoyage Au Kärcher" 3:44
12. "Victoria" 3:37
13. "Entre Les Mots : Du Local Au Global" 1:52
14. "Jeunesse Du Monde" 5:25
15. "Ils Ont Peur De La Liberté" 3:39
16. "Je Suis La Solitaire" 4:46
17. "Sans Terre D'Asile" 4:07
18. "Entre Les Lignes : Une Goutte De Plus" 3:20
19. "Entre Les Lignes : Prière" 4:18

== Charts ==
Chart (2006)	Peak position
Belgian Albums (Ultratop Wallonia)	88
French Albums (SNEP)	18
Swiss Albums (Schweizer Hitparade)	95

== Certifications ==
Region	Certification	Certified units/sales
France (SNEP)	Platinum	100,000^{‡}
^{‡} Sales+streaming figures based on certification alone.
