= Pauline Croze (album) =

Studio album by Pauline Croze
- Released: 2005
- Length: 38:15

Pauline Croze is the first album by French pop/folk singer Pauline Croze, recorded in 2004 and released in February 2005, containing songs by Doriand and by Mickaël Furnon of the group Mickey 3D.

== Track listing ==
Pauline Croze track listing
No.	Title	Length
1.	"Mise À Nu"	3:29
2.	"Dans La Chaleur Des Nuits De Pleine Lune"	2:23
3.	"M'en Voulez-Vous?"	3:01
4.	"Jeunesse Affamée"	3:35
5.	"T'es Beau"	2:43
6.	"Quand Je Suis Ivre"	3:28
7.	"Je Suis Floue"	1:52
8.	"Je Ferai Sans"	3:18
9.	"Larmes"	2:36
10.	"Tita"	3:22
11.	"Femme Fossile"	3:08
12.	"Mal Assis"	5:20
Total length:		41:15
