= L'amour parfait =

Studio album by Cali
- Released: 19 August 2003
- Genre: Rock; chanson
- Language: French

Cali chronology
L'amour parfait (2003)	Menteur (2005)

L'amour parfait (French for 'the perfect love') is the debut album of French singer Cali, released on August 19, 2003. The album was dedicated to Franck Vanderbergh. All songs are written and sung by Cali with the help of Hugues Baretege, Henri Serra, and Gilles Taillade on the song "Différent". A second edition of this album was released in 2004 with a bonus cd that included four different versions of tracks on the original album: "Différent" (long version), "La vie est parfaite" (unedited), "Fais de moi ce que tu veux" (long version), and "Elle m'a dit" (live). The album was certified platinum in France.

== Track listing ==
1. "C’est quand le bonheur ?" 04:31
2. "Elle m’a dit" 03:33
3. "Pensons à l’avenir" 04:22
4. "Il y a une question" 04:03
5. "J’ai besoin d’amour" 03:59
6. "Dolorosa" 02:30
7. "Tes désirs font désordre" 02:41
8. "C’est toujours le matin" 03:28
9. "Le Grand jour" 04:07
10. "Fais de moi ce que tu veux" 03:11
11. "Différent" 04:48
12. "Tout va bien" 04:04
13. "L’amour parfait" 04:06
