= Augusto Belin =

Argentine writer and diplomat (1854–1936)

Augusto Belin (January 14, 1854 – September 25, 1936) was an Argentine writer and diplomat, son of printer Julio Belin and Ana Faustina Sarmiento, daughter of Domingo Faustino Sarmiento.

Belin was born in Chile and accompanied his maternal grandfather on his travels to Lima and Washington, D.C. Belin studied at West Point Military Academy. Along his travels he ended up in Paris in 1870 and fought as a volunteer soldier.

He began his career as a collaborator at XIXme. Siècle on Argentine matters. Upon returning home to Argentina, he was employed by the National Senate as translator of Wilson Book Review Digest in 1877, charged with managing the Biblioteca Nacional de Maestros where he created an inventory, finding 8,733 copies in the archive and 39,152 in the deposit.

The following year he became an editor of El Nacional at that time under the direction of Domingo Faustino Sarmiento. He also took the position of director of the Biblioteca Pública de San Juan and Minister of Intervention in Catamarca in 1893.

He acted as Argentine Consul to various countries: the Netherlands, Paraguay, Belgium, Italy and France from 1906 to 1926.

At the time of his death he was the commercial attaché in the Argentine delegation in Asunción.

== Works ==
- Una república muerta, with an introduction by Lucio V. López
- Un criollo en Países Bajos
- El joven Sarmiento
