= Florent Marchet =

French singer-songwriter (born 1975)

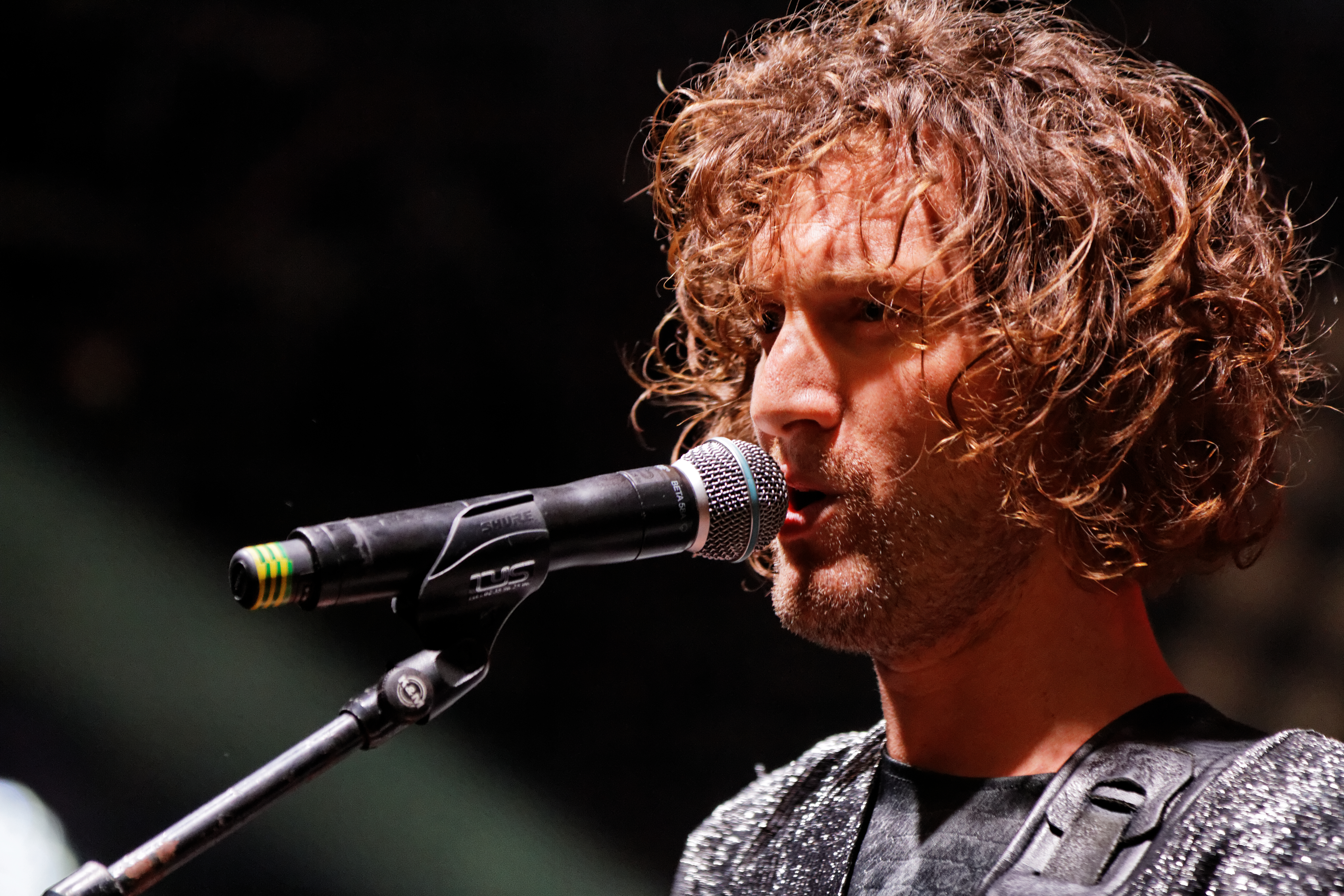
- Florent Marchet in 2010

Background information
- Born: 21 June 1975 (age 49); Bourges, France
- Occupation(s): Singer, musician
- Instrument(s): Vocals, piano, guitar, drums, flute
- Years active: 2004–present
- Website: www.florentmarchet.com

Florent Marchet (born 21 June 1975) is a French singer-songwriter. His debut album, Gargilesse, was released in 2004.

Florent plays the piano, guitar, drums, and flute. He has collaborated with François Poggio, Pete Thomas, and Charlie Poggio. He has released four albums and an EP to date.

== Discography ==
=== Albums ===
Year	Album	Peak positions	
Year	Album	FR	BEL (Wa)
2004	Gargilesse	140	–
2007	Rio Baril	90	–
2010	Courchevel	35	–
2014	Bambi Galaxy	36	35

=== EPs ===
Year	Album	Peak positions	
Year	Album	FR	BEL (Wa)
2011	Noël's Songs	–	–

=== Singles ===
- 2011: "Des hauts, des bas" (with Gaëtan Roussel)
