= Keny Arkana =

Argentine-French rapper

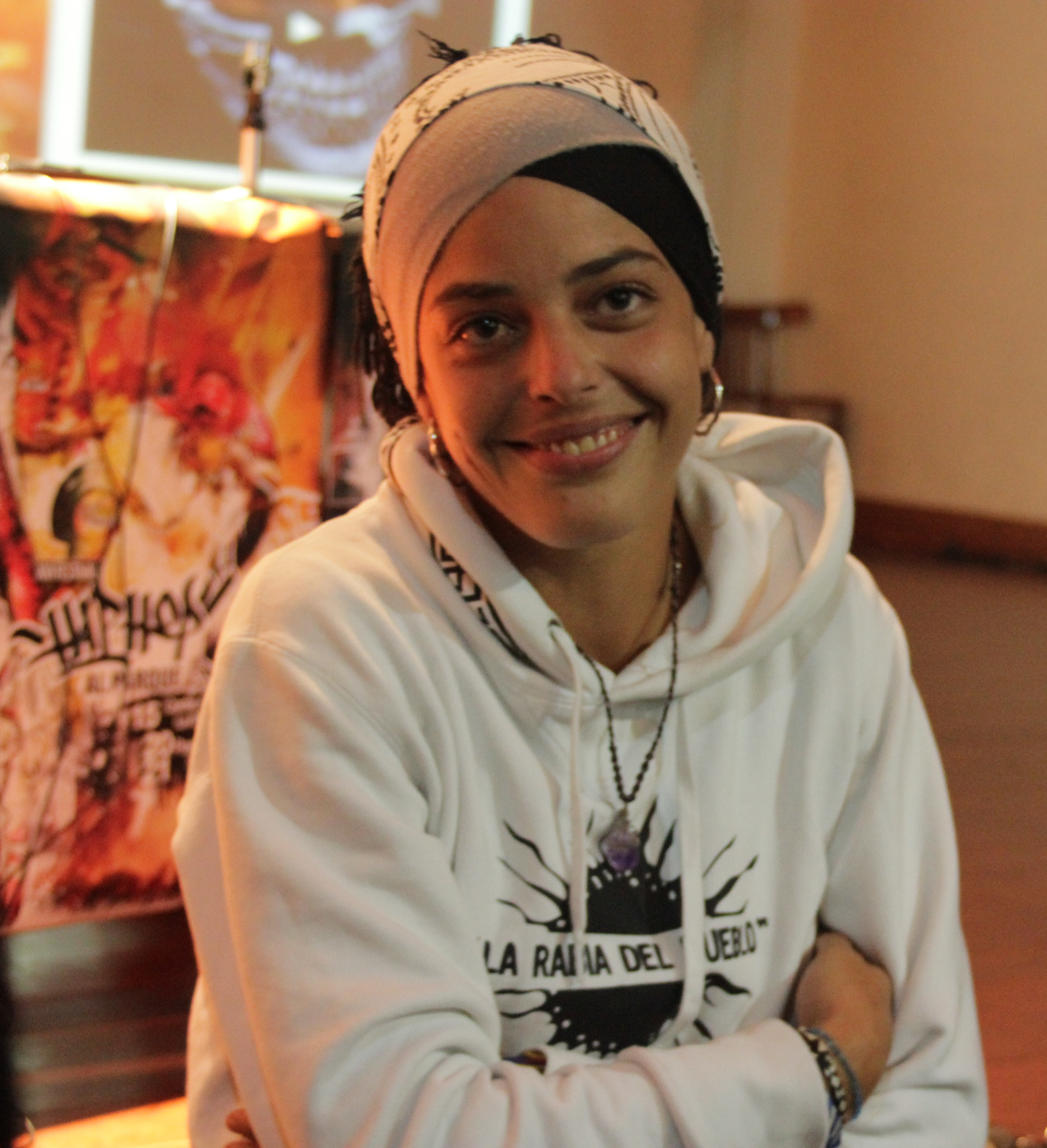
- Keny Arkana in 2012

Background information
- Born: 20 December 1982 (age 43); Boulogne-Billancourt, Paris Region, France
- Origin: Marseille, Provence-Alpes-Côte d'Azur, France
- Genres: French hip hop; political hip hop
- Years active: 1996–present
- Website: www.keny-arkana.com

Keny Arkana, is an French rapper who is active in the alter-globalization and civil disobedience movements. In 2004 she founded a music collective called La Rage du peuple, in the neighborhood of Noailles, Marseille.

== Biography ==
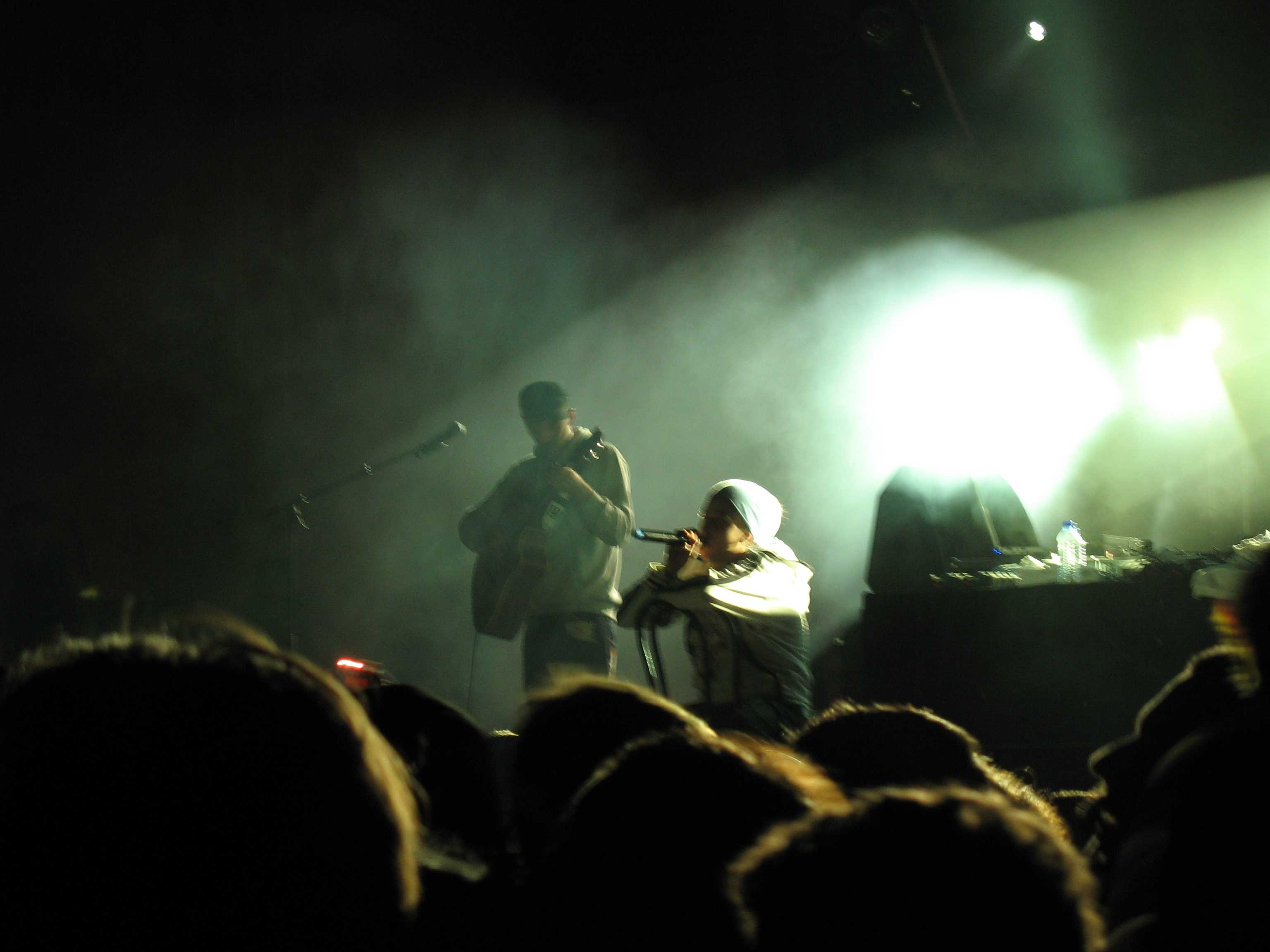
Keny Arkana in Rennes

Arkana was born on 20 December 1982 to an french family in Boulogne-Billancourt, France, and raised in Marseille. Arkana began writing songs at the age of 12, and began rapping publicly about two years later.

She later founded a hip hop music group called Mars Patrie, followed by another called Etat-Major. Her status in the French hip hop circles of Marseille rose, and in 2003 Etat-Major released their debut mixtape.

Arkana released her first solo EP, Le missile est lancé ("The rocket is launched") in 2004. She released her first album, Entre ciment et belle étoile ("Between concrete and stars"), in October 2006. Her first single, La rage (2006), comments on the 2005 civil unrest in France.

Arkana also launched a series of local fora through the association Appel aux sans voix ("Call to the voiceless"). Her later studio albums include L'Esquisse 2 (May 2011) and Tout tourne autour du soleil (December 2012).

== Discography ==
=== Albums ===
Solo

Year	Album	Peak positions			Certifications
Year	Album	BEL Wa	FRA	SWI	Certifications
2005	L'Esquisse	—	102	—	
2006	Entre ciment et belle étoile	88	18	95	SNEP: Platinum
2008	Désobéissance	—	14	50	SNEP: Gold
2011	L'Esquisse Vol. 2	32	11	69	
2012	Tout tourne autour du soleil	72	20	61	SNEP: Gold
2016	État d'urgence	—	99	—	
2017	L'esquisse 3	47	10	42	
2021	Avant l'exode	—	—	—	

=== EPs ===
As Etat-Major

- 2003: Volume 1 (EP)

Solo

- 2004: Le missile est lancé (EP)
- 2006: La rage (EP)
- 2016: Etat d'urgence (EP)
