= Gargilesse =

Studio album by Florent Marchet
- Released: 2004
- Label: Universal Records

Gargilesse is an album by Florent Marchet released in 2004 on Universal Records.

== Track listing ==
1. "Levallois"
2. "Tous Pareils"
3. "Mes Nouveaux Amis"
4. "Dimanche"
5. "Je N'ai Pensé Qu'à Moi"
6. "Le Meilleur De Nous Deux"
7. "Avez-Vous Déjà Songé"
8. "Gargilesse"
9. "Le Terrain De Sport"
10. "Fantome"
11. "Je M'en Tire Pas Mal"
12. "Les Grandes Vacances"
