= Cali (singer) =

French singer-songwriter

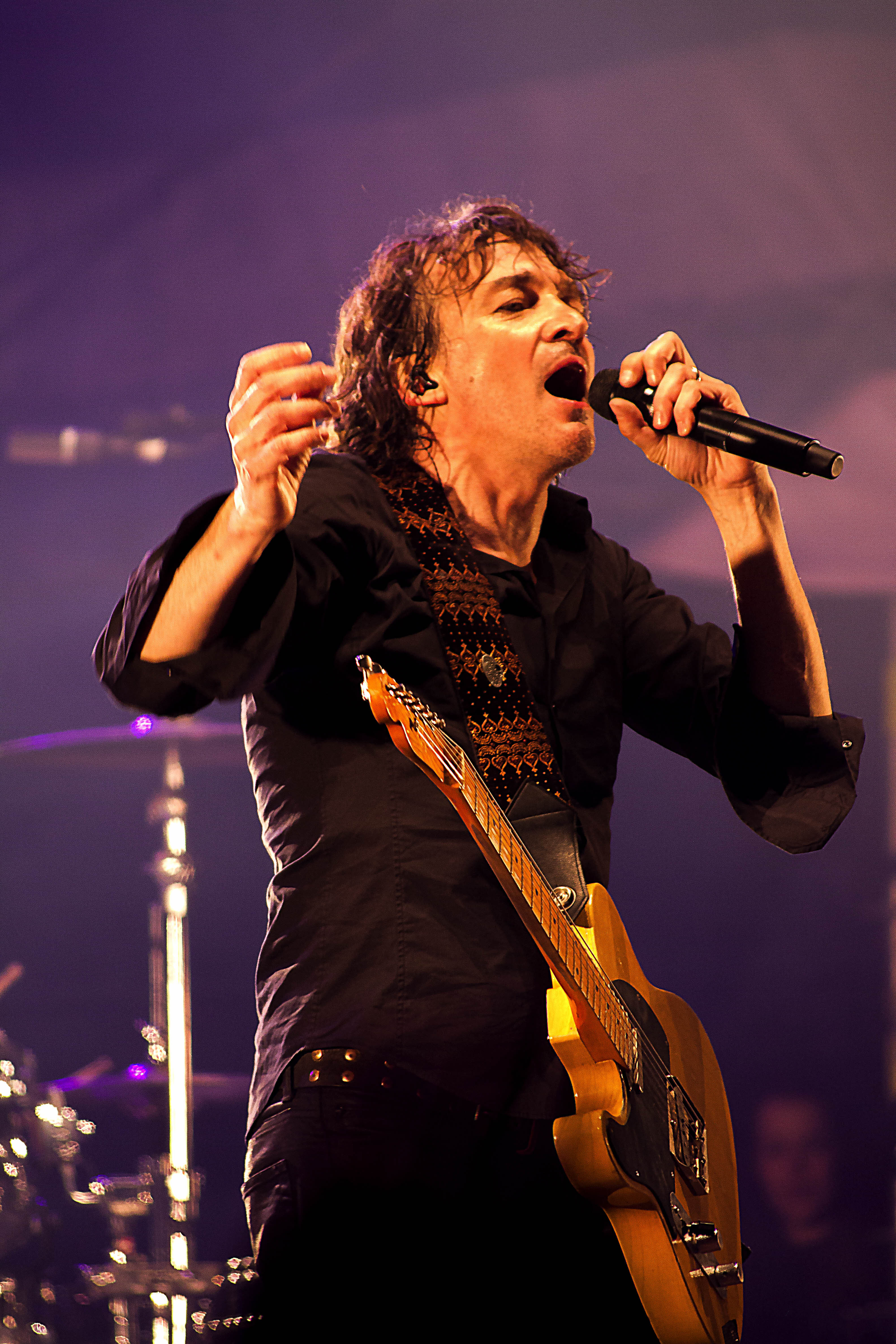

Background information
- Birth name: Bruno Caliciuri
- Born: 28 June 1968 (age 57); Perpignan, Pyrénées-Orientales, France
- Origin: Languedoc-Roussillon, France
- Genres: Pop/Rock
- Occupation(s): Singer, songwriter

Bruno Caliciuri (born 28 June 1968), known professionally as Cali, is a French singer-songwriter.

== Early life and career ==
Cali was born 28 June 1968 in Perpignan to an Italian father and Catalan mother. He grew up in Vernet-les-Bains. A fan of English rock and French chanson during his youth, Cali was also a keen rugby player. He played for his region and Perpignan (USAP). Inspired by a U2 concert in 1984, Cali devoted himself more to music and less to rugby.

At the age of 17, Cali discovered punk music in Ireland. This was the style of his first group Pénétration anale. His second group was composed of friends from Vernet-les-Bains, and called Les Rebelles. From 25 to 28, Cali self-produced two albums with the band Indy, then was part of Tom Scarlett, where he worked with his past guitarist Hugo Baretge. At the end of 2001, Cali stopped work with Tom record company Labels, which signed him on. At the end of 2003, he released his first well-known solo album L'amour parfait. Regarded as a critical success, the album made him known amongst the premier French artists. Popular songs from the album include "Elle m'a dit", the single "C'est quand le bonheur" and "Pensons à l'avenir".

In October 2005, Cali released his second solo album Menteur. This album reinforced his position amongst France's most popular artists. Popular songs include "Je ne vivrai pas sans toi" and the single "Je m'en vais (après Miossec)".

In 2006, he published "Le bordel magnifique" which was recorded during his Menteur tour in Zénith de Lille. It witnesses the connection established between the singer and his audience through the concert.

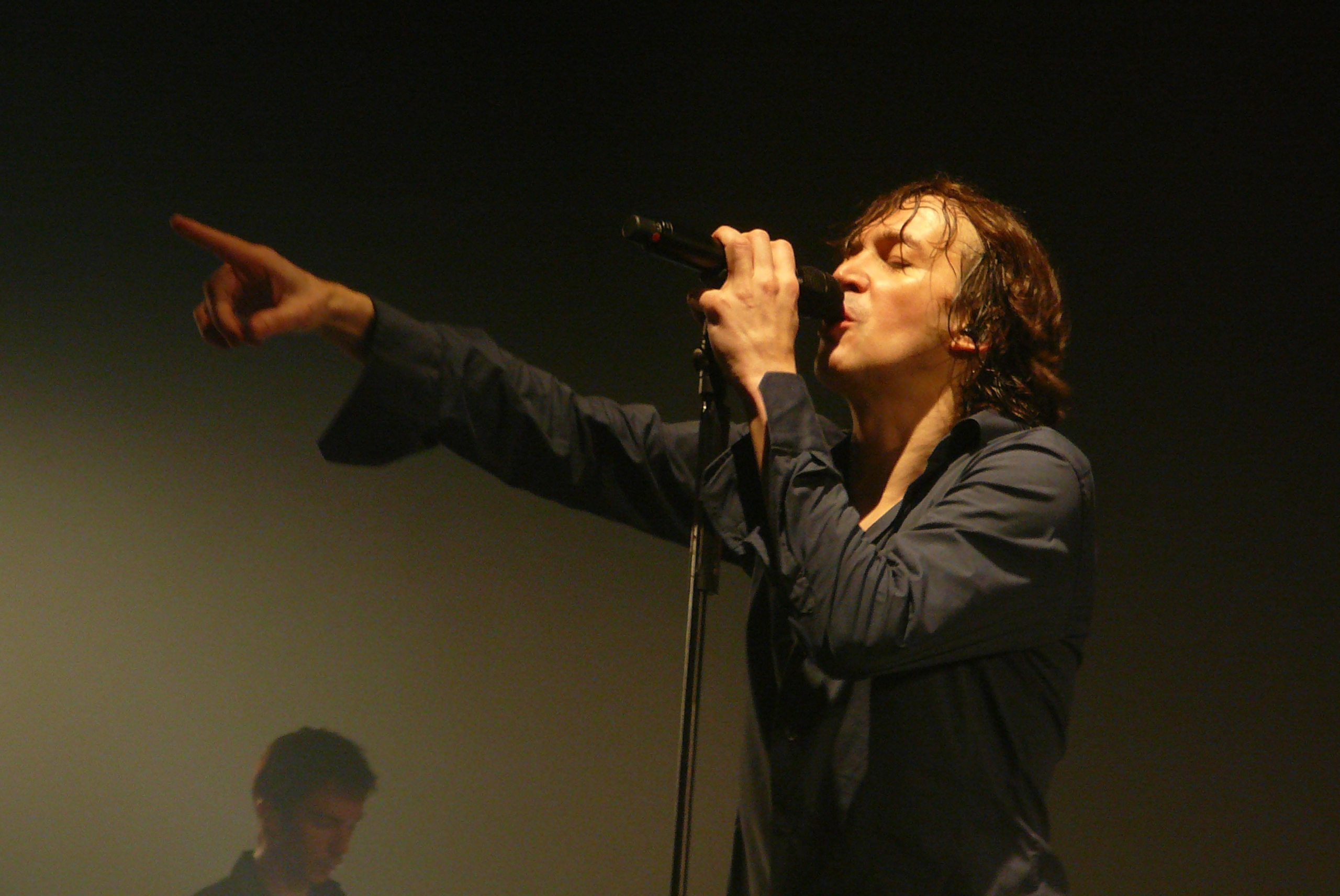
Cali in concert in Paris in 2008

In 2007, he went on a support tour for all the producers of cheese pies hard hit by the crisis that raged that year in the cheese industry, thanks to which he was inducted Chevalier du Camembert Doré and Grand Maître de l'Emmental.

In 2008, he released his third solo album L'espoir which was recorded in the South of France with the help of Mathias Malzieu and Scott Colburn. He expressed his penchant for love stories, but also his political engagement in "Résistance" and the single "1000 coeurs debout"

In 2010 he got prankster Rémi Gaillard to make the clip for his song "L'amour fou".

== Style ==
Cali's musical style is pop and rock music. He is accompanied usually by a rock trio (guitar, drums, bass) but often also a violin, saxophone, trumpet and even trombone (for songs like "Tes Yeux"), giving his music a unique almost folk and jazz feel. Cali accompanies himself sometimes with acoustic guitar. On stage, he is known for injecting much passion and energy into his performances. He will often perform a stage dive towards the end of his set, which in at least four instances led to serious injuries.

== Awards ==
He was nominated for the Breakthrough Artist of the Year award at the 2003 edition of the Victoires de la musique – France's version of the Grammys. In 2004 he was nominated for Male Artist/Group of the Year, Song of the Year for "Pensons à l'avenir" and Concert/Show of the Year for his concert at the Bataclan.

== Personal life ==
He currently lives in Languedoc-Roussillon with his two children.

== Discography ==
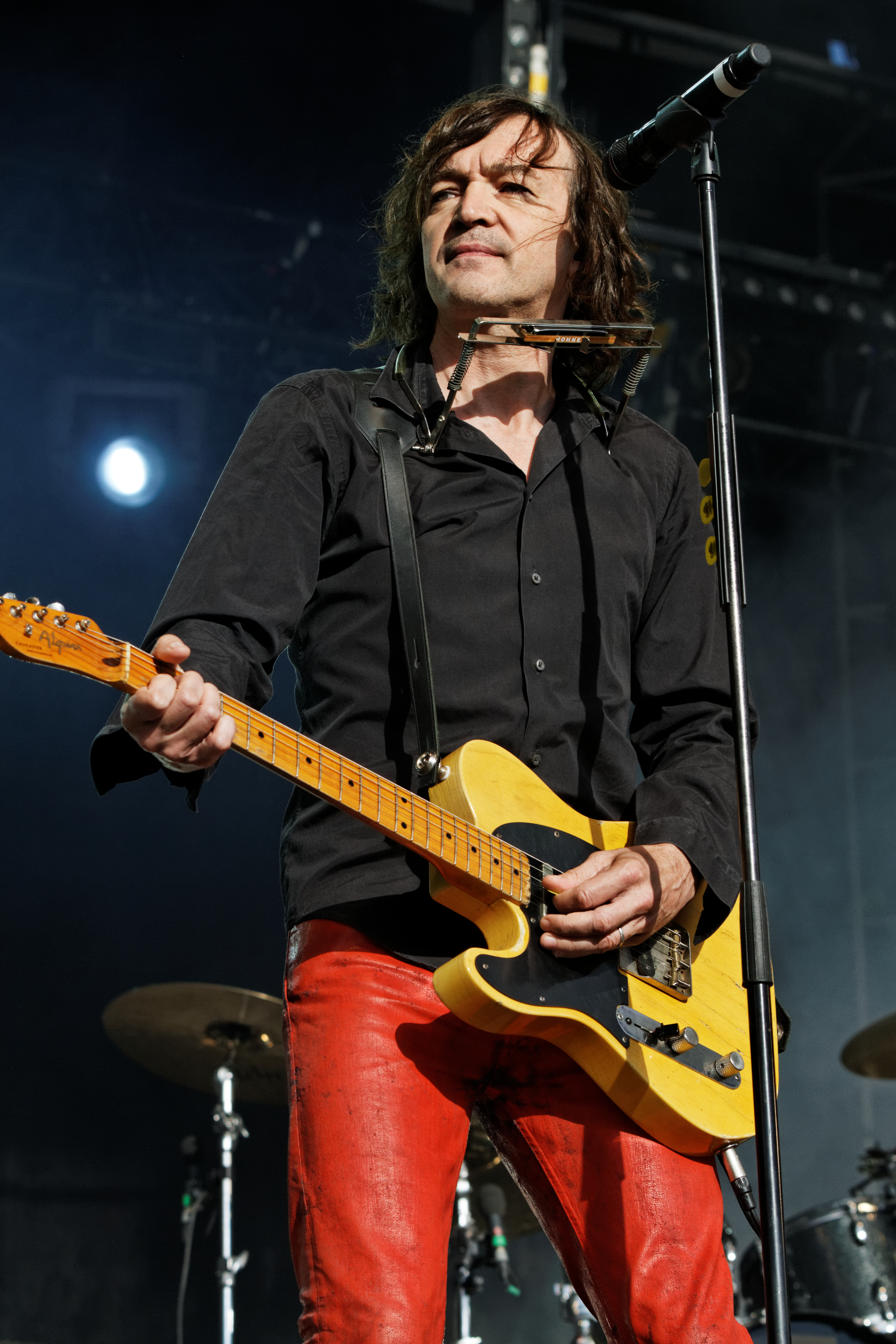
Cali performing in 2013

=== Albums ===
Studio albums

Year	Album	Peak positions			Certifications
Year	Album	BEL Wa	FRA	SWI	Certifications
2003	L'amour parfait	18	7	68	SNEP: Gold
2005	Menteur	7	2	33	SNEP: Gold
2006	Le bordel magnifique	27	13	93	SNEP: Gold
2008	L'espoir	2	1	16	SNEP: Gold
2010	La vie est une truite arc-en-ciel qui nage dans mon cœur	4	11	61	SNEP: Gold
2012	Vernet les bains	22	21	—	
2016	Les choses défendues	36	48	—	
2018	Chante Léo Ferré	122	—	—	
2020	Cavale	33	40	—	
2022	Ces jours qu'on a presque oubliés Vol. 1	30	—	—	

Live albums

Year	Album	Peak positions		Certifications
Year	Album	BEL Wa	FRA	Certifications
2003	Le bruit de ma vie - Live.01	32	26	
2013	La vie cowboy (3 CDs)	71	75	

=== Singles ===
Year	Single	Peak positions	Album
Year	Single	FRA	Album
2003	"C'est quand le bonheur?"	85	L'amour parfait
2004	"Je m'en vais"	56	Menteur

Others

Year	Single	Peak positions	Album
Year	Single	FRA	Album
2013	"Un arc en ciel" (Téléthon 2013) (Bénabar, Bruel, Cali et Marina)	1	

=== DVDs ===
- 2004: Pleine de vie - Recorded at the Bataclan

=== Soundtracks ===
Year	Album	Peak positions	
Year	Album	BEL Wa	FRA
2008	Magique	98	159
