= List of ship launches in 2008 =

The list of ship launches in 2008 includes a chronological list of ships launched in 2008.

Date	Ship	Class / type	Builder	Location	Country	Note
18 January	SuperSpeed 2	RoPax-ferry	Aker Yards	Rauma	Finland	For Color Line
26 January	Dewey	Arleigh Burke-class destroyer	Ingalls Shipbuilding	Pascagoula, Mississippi	United States	
26 January	Rio de la Plata	Rio-class container ship	Daewoo Shipbuilding & Marine Engineering Co.	Okpo	South Korea	For Hamburg Süd
1 February	Ruby Princess	Modified Grand-class cruise ship	Fincantieri	Monfalcone	Italy	For Princess Cruises
1 February	Bremen Express	Colombo-Express-classe container ship	Hyundai Heavy Industries	Ulsan	South Korea	For Hapag Lloyd
5 February	Margrethe Mærsk	M-class container ship	Odense Staalskibsvaerft	Lindø	Denmark	For Maersk Line
5 February	Saman	Tanker	Hyundai Samho Heavy Industries		South Korea	
6 February	MSC Fantasia	Fantasia-class cruise ship	Chantiers de l’Atlantique	Saint Nazaire	France	For MSC Cruises
13 February	Yury Dolgorukiy	Borei-class submarine	Sevmash	Severodvinsk	Russia	
17 February	Anne-Sofie	Sietas type 161 heavy lift vessel	J.J. Sietas	Hamburg-Neuenfelde	Germany	For SAL Heavy Lift
21 February	New Hampshire	Virginia-class submarine	Electric Boat	Groton, Connecticut	United States	
24 February	Stockdale	Arleigh Burke-class destroyer	Bath Iron Works	Bath, Maine	United States	
1 March	Eemshorn		Ferus Smit	Leer	Germany	
5 March	Atlântida	Passenger ship	Estaleiros Navais de Viana do Castelo	Viana do Castelo	Portugal	For Atlanticoline SA
10 March	Juan Carlos I	Juan Carlos I-class amphibious assault ship	Navantia	Ferrol	Spain	
14 March	Combi Dock II	Combi Dock-class				For K/S Combi Lift
28 March	Marchen Mærsk	M-class container ship	Odense Staalskibsvaerft	Lindø	Denmark	For Maersk Line
March	Sirius Star		Daewoo Shipbuilding & Marine Engineering	Okpo	South Korea	
6 April	Amelia Earhart	Lewis and Clark-class dry cargo ship	National Steel & Shipbuilding	San Diego, California	United States	
19 April	Rio de Janeiro	Rio-class container ship	Daewoo Shipbuilding & Marine Engineering Co.	Okpo	South Korea	For Hamburg Süd
26 April	Independence	Independence-class littoral combat ship	Austal USA	Mobile, Alabama	United States	For US Navy
30 April	Racha Bhum	Type Stocznia Gdynia 8184-container ship	Stocznia Gdynia	Gdynia	Poland	
3 May	UC3 Nautilus	midget submarine		Copenhagen	Denmark	
17 May	Monte Azul	Monte-class container ship	Daewoo Mangalia Heavy Industries SA	Mangalia	Romania	For Hamburg Süd
4 June	Maren Mærsk	M-class container ship	Odense Staalskibsvaerft	Lindø	Denmark	For Maersk Line
4 June	An Jung-geun	Type 214 submarine	Hyundai Heavy Industries		South Korea	For South Korean Navy
12 June	Seefalke	Seeadler-class fishery protection vessel	Peene-Werft	Wolgast	Germany	For German Federal Coast Guard
21 June	Spirit of Mystery	Lugger	Colin Rees	Milbrook	United Kingdom	Replica of Mystery
30 June	Costa Pacifica	Concordia-class cruise ship	Fincantieri	Sestri Ponente	Italy	For Costa Cruises
30 June	Costa Luminosa	Hybrid Vista-class and Spirit-class cruise ship	Fincantieri	Marghera	Italy	For Costa Cruises
12 July	Waesche	Legend-class cutter	NGSS Ingalls	Pascagoula, Mississippi	United States	
12 July	CMA CGM Vela	Container ship	Daewoo Shipbuilding & Marine Engineering	Okpo	South Korea	For CMA CGM
15 July	Tridente	Type 214 submarine	HDW	Kiel	Germany	For Portuguese Navy
18 July	Vera Rambow	Sietas typr 178 container ship	Schiffswerft J.J. Sietas	Hamburg-Neuenfelde	Germany	For Rambow Bereederungs Gesellschaft
20 July	MSC Splendida	Fantasia-class cruise ship	Aker Yards	Saint Nazaire	France	For MSC Crociere
4 August	Combi Dock III	Combi Dock-class				For K/S Combi Lift
4 August	OSA Goliath	Goliath-class crane ship	Pt. Drydocks World Pertama	Batam	Indonesia	For CVI Global Lux Oil & Gas 4 Sàrl
10 August	Celebrity Solstice	Solstice-class cruise ship	Meyer Werft	Papenburg	Germany	For Celebrity Cruises
22 August	Trina	Sietas type 161 heavy lift vessel	J.J. Sietas	Hamburg-Neuenfelde	Germany	For SAL Heavy Lift
26 August	Mette Mærsk	M-class container ship	Odense Staalskibsvaerft	Lindø	Denmark	For Maersk Line
30 August	Rio Negro	Rio-class container ship	Daewoo Shipbuilding & Marine Engineering Co.	Okpo	South Korea	For Hamburg Süd
August	Manisa Bella	General cargo vessel			Liberia	
6 September	Monte Alegre	Monte-class container ship	Daewoo Mangalia Heavy Industries SA	Mangalia	Romania	For Hamburg Süd
16 September	Rolldock Sun	S-class Heavy lift ship	Larsen & Toubro	Hazira	India	For Rolldock
18 September	Carl Brashear	Lewis and Clark-class dry cargo ship	National Steel & Shipbuilding	San Diego, California	United States	
25 September	Northern Expedition	Ro-Ro Ferry	Flensburger Schiffbau-Gesellschaft	Flensburg	Germany	
26 September	Bell M. Shimada	Research vessel	Halter Marine, Inc.	Pascagoula, Mississippi	United States	
27 September	Citadel		Ferus Smit	Leer	Germany	
2 October	Charlotta	Sietas type 178 container ship	Schiffswerft J.J. Sietas	Hamburg-Neuenfelde	Germany	For Reederei Gerd Bartels
8 October	Tunku Abdul Razak	Scorpène-class submarine	Navantia	Cartagena	Spain	For Royal Malaysian Navy
9 October	Laganborg		Koninklijke Niestern Sander	Delfzijl	Netherlands	For Wagenborg Shipping
15 October	Unryū	Sōryū-class submarine			Japan	
15 October	Clipper Pennant	Ro-Ro Ferry	Astilleros de Huelva,	Sevilla	Spain	For Seatruck Ferries
17 October	Stefan Sibum	SSW Super 1000 container ship	Schichau Seebeckwerft	Bremerhaven	Germany	Reederei Bernd Sibum
17 October	Meerkatze	Seeadler-class fishery protection vessel	Peene-Werft	Wolgast	Germany	For German Federal Coast Guard
18 October	Wayne E. Meyer	Arleigh Burke-class destroyer	Bath Iron Works	Bath, Maine	United States	
24 October	Carnival Dream	Dream-class cruise ship	Fincantieri	Monfalcone	Italy	For Carnival Cruise Lines
27 October	Susan Borchard	Damen Container Feeder 800 container ship	Santierul Naval Damen Galati SA	Galați	Romania	
1 November	Sarafsa	Motor yacht	Babcock Marine Ltd.	Appledore	United Kingdom	For private owner.
3 November	Regine	Sietas type 161 heavy lift vessel	J.J. Sietas	Hamburg-Neuenfelde	Germany	For SAL Heavy Lift
5 November	YM Uranus	Chemical tanker	Marmara Shipyards	Istanbul	Turkey	
7 November	Marit Mærsk	M-class container ship	Odense Staalskibsvaerft	Lindø	Denmark	For Maersk Line
17 November	Dragon	Type 45 destroyer	BVT Surface Fleet	Govan	United Kingdom	
22 November	Oasis of the Seas	Oasis-class cruise ship	STX Europe	Turku	Finland	For Royal Caribbean International
23 November	Monte Aconcagua	Monte-class container ship	Daewoo Mangalia Heavy Industries SA	Mangalia	Romania	For Hamburg Süd
24 November	Kelantan	Kedah-class offshore patrol vessel	PSC-Naval Dockyard		Malaysia	
27 November	Derafsh	Sina-class fast attack craft	Shahid Tamjidi shipyard	Bandar Anzali	Iran	For Islamic Republic of Iran Navy
28 November	Medondra	type CV Venus 5300 container ship	Zhejiang Ouhua Shipbuilding	Zhoushan	China	For Reederei Buss
5 December	Baltic Queen	Ferry	STX Europe	Rauma	Finland	For Tallink
15 December	Thetis	Sietas typr 178 container ship	Schiffswerft J.J. Sietas	Hamburg-Neuenfelde	Germany	For Reederei Drevin, Cuxhaven
16 December	Kaspar Schepers	Damen Container Feeder 800 container ship	Santierul Naval Damen Galati SA	Galați	Romania	
27 December	MSC Danit	MSC Danit-type container ship	Daewoo Shipbuilding & Marine Engineering	Geoje	South Korea	For Mediterranean Shipping Company
