= Mysterium =

Mysterium may refer to:

- Mysterium (John Zorn album), 2005
- Mysterium (Manilla Road album), 2013
- Mysterium (board game), a cooperative board game designed by Oleksandr Nevskiy and Oleg Sidorenko
- Mysterium (novel), an alternate history novel by Robert Charles Wilson
- Mysterium (Scriabin), an unfinished work by the Russian composer Alexander Scriabin
- Mysterium, seventh part of composer Georges Lentz’ musical cycle Caeli enarrant...
- Mysterium (video game), a video game published in 1991
- Mysterium (convention), an annual conference concerned with the Myst series of computer games
- Greco-Roman mysteries, religious schools for which participation was reserved to initiates

== See also ==
- Mysteria (disambiguation)
- Mystery (disambiguation)
- Mysterium fidei (disambiguation)
