= Mystery =

Mystery, The Mystery, Mysteries or The Mysteries may refer to:

== Arts, entertainment, and media ==
=== Fictional characters ===
- Mystery, a cat character in Emily the Strange
- Mystery, a seahorse that SpongeBob SquarePants adopts in the episode "My Pretty Seahorse"

=== Films ===
- Mystery (2012 film), a 2012 Chinese drama film
- Mystery (2014 film), a 2014 Chinese suspense thriller adventure film
- Mystery, Alaska, a 1999 comedy-drama film
- Gumnaam – The Mystery, a 2008 Indian Hindi-language thriller film
- Room: The Mystery, a 2014 Indian film

=== Genres ===
- Mystery fiction, a genre of detective fiction
  - Mystery film, the cinematic genre

=== Literature ===
- Mysteries (novel) or Mysterie, an 1892 existentialist novel by Knut Hamsun
- Mystery (novel), a 1990 novel by American author Peter Straub
- A Mystery, an 1896 novella by Clara H. Mountcastle
- The Mystery (1907), a novel by Samuel Hopkins Adams

=== Newspapers ===
- The Mystery (newspaper), an African American newspaper by Martin Delany

=== Music ===
==== Groups ====
- Mystery (band), a Canadian progressive-rock band formed in 1986

==== Albums and EPs ====
- Mystery (Blk Jks EP), 2009
- Mystery (Mystery EP), 1992
- Mystery (RAH Band album), 1985
- Mystery (Faye Wong album), 1994
- Mystery, a 1984 album by Vanilla Fudge
- Mystery, a 2006 album Evonne Hsu
- Myst3ry, a 2016 EP by Ladies' Code
- The Mystery (album)

==== Songs ====
- "Mystery", a song by Live from the 2006 album Songs from Black Mountain
- "Mystery", a song by Dio from the 1984 album The Last in Line
- "Mystery", a song by Hugh Laurie from the television series A Bit of Fry & Laurie
- "Mystery", a song by Miles Davis from the 1992 album Doo-Bop
- "Mystery", a song by Raveena from the album Asha's Awakening
- "Mystery", a song by Sara Groves from the album Invisible Empires
- "Mystery", a song by Rod Temperton, performed by The Manhattan Transfer and Anita Baker
- "Mystery", a song by The Olivia Tremor Control from the album Black Foliage: Animation Music Volume One
- "Mystery", a song by Wipers from the 1980 album Is This Real?
- "Mystery", a song by Pond from the 2012 album Beard, Wives, Denim

=== Television ===
==== Series ====
- It's a Mystery (TV series), a children's television show
- Mystery!, a PBS program showcasing British detective fiction

==== Other uses in television ====
- "Mystery" (Pee-wee's Playhouse), an episode of the children's show Pee-wee's Playhouse
- "The Mystery" (The Amazing World of Gumball), an episode of the TV show The Amazing World of Gumball
- Mystery TV, a Canadian digital television channel
- Ion Mystery, an American digital television channel formerly branded as Mystery

== People ==
- Mystery (pickup artist) (born 1971), stage name of entertainer Erik Von Markovik

== Religion and ancient culture ==
- Mystery play, such as the Passion play
- Sacred mysteries, beliefs which cannot be explained by normal reasoning, or esoteric teachings which are kept secret from the non-initiated
  - Greco-Roman mysteries, ancient religious cults whose rituals were not revealed to outsiders; the most famous were the Eleusinian Mysteries
- Paschal mystery, central to Catholic faith and theology relating to the history of salvation

== Vessels ==
- Mystery, a cutter built in 1863 by Peter Hedland and subsequently captained by him on journeys to Western Australia
- Mystery (log canoe), a Chesapeake Bay log canoe
- Mystery (lugger), a Mount's Bay lugger which made a voyage from Cornwall to Australia in 1855
  - Spirit of Mystery, a modern recreation of Mystery
- USS Mystery, the name of more than one proposed or actual United States Navy ships

== Other uses ==
- The Mystery, local name for Wavertree Playground, Liverpool, England
- Sunbeam 1000 HP Mystery, car that held the land-speed record

== See also ==
- Anomaly (disambiguation), a deviation or departure from the normal
- Enigma (disambiguation)
- Fushigi (disambiguation), Japanese for "mystery" or "secret"
- Mystère (disambiguation)
- Mysterious (disambiguation)
- Mystery watch
- Puzzle
- Riddle
- Secret
- Unsolved problem
