= Mystere =

Mystere may refer to:

- Mystere (Everquest character), a fictional character in the role-playing game Everquest
- Mystere (Full Moon o Sagashite), a fictional character in the manga series Full Moon o Sagashite
- Mystere (horse), Indonesian racehorse winner of the Triple Crown (1978)

== See also ==
- Mystère (disambiguation)
