= Mysterons =

Mysterons may refer to:

- The Mysterons, a race of Extraterrestrials that appear in the 1960s TV series Captain Scarlet and the Mysterons and its 2000s remake, New Captain Scarlet
- "The Mysterons", the first episode of Captain Scarlet and the Mysterons
- "Mysterons", a song by Portishead from their 1994 album Dummy
- The Mysterons, a 1986-1987 psychobilly band from England
- The Mysterons, a 2016-2017 psych-groove garage rock band from Amsterdam, the Netherlands

== See also ==
- Mysterians (disambiguation)
- Mysterion (disambiguation)
