= Paradigmes =

Studio album by La Femme
- Released: 2 April 2021
- Length: 54:32
- Label: Disque Pointu
- Producer: La Femme

La Femme chronology
Mystère (2016)	Paradigmes (2021)	Teatro lúcido (2022)

Singles from Paradigmes
- 1. "Paradigme" Released: 10 September 2020; 2. "Cool Colorado" Released: 17 November 2020; 3. "Disconnexion" Released: 3 December 2020; 4. "Foutre le bordel" Released: 13 January 2021; 5. "Le jardin" Released: 9 February 2021; 6. "Le sang de mon prochain" Released: 17 March 2021

Paradigmes is the third studio album by French rock band La Femme. The album was released on 2 April 2021 through Disque Pointu.

== Background ==
Paradigmes is a mix of a bunch of songs recorded from 2012 to 2018, in France, Spain, and the United States. Prior to the album's release, main vocalist Clémence Quélenec left the band for her solo career, and former member Clara Luciani participated in backing vocals for Foreigner and Paradigme.

== Critical reception ==
Professional ratings
Aggregate scores
Source	Rating
Metacritic	79/100
Review scores
Source	Rating
AllMusic	4/5 stars
DIY	3/5 stars
The Line of Best Fit	8/10
musicOMH	4.5/5 stars
Pitchfork	6.9/10

On review aggregator website, Metacritic, Paradigmes has an average critic score of 79 out of 100, indicating "universal acclaim" based on five critics. Heather Phares of AllMusic said "La Femme's passion for seeking out new (or vintage) sounds to add to their omnivorous pop is contagious, and never more so than on Paradigmes." Sophie Kemp of Pitchfork reviewed the album as "Paradigmes is a good time, but its intellectual merit is entirely surface level."

== Track listing ==
No.	Title	Length
1.	"Paradigme"	3:36
2.	"Le Sang de mon prochain"	3:30
3.	"Cool Colorado"	3:52
4.	"Foutre le bordel"	2:10
5.	"Nouvelle-Orléans"	3:54
6.	"Pasadena"	3:49
7.	"Lâcher de chevaux"	2:32
8.	"Disconnexion"	3:21
9.	"Foreigner"	3:33
10.	"Force & Respect"	2:09
11.	"Divine Créature"	5:08
12.	"Mon ami"	2:37
13.	"Le Jardin"	4:00
14.	"Va"	4:19
15.	"Tu t'en lasses"	6:02
Total length:		54:32
