= Unryū =

Unryū (雲龍) or Cloud Dragon, a mythical creature in Japanese folklore, may refer to:

== Warships ==
- Unryū-class aircraft carrier, World War II Japanese aircraft carriers
- Japanese aircraft carrier Unryū, the lead ship of her class of fleet aircraft carriers built for the Imperial Japanese Navy (IJN) during World War II
- JS Unryū (SS-502), a Japanese Sōryū-class submarine launched in 2008

== Other uses ==
- Akari Unryu, an anime character
- Unryū Kyūkichi, early 19th-century sumo champion
- fiber from the paper mulberry tree is sometimes known as Unryū and is also known as Washi
