= Mysterio (disambiguation) =

Mysterio is a supervillain in the Marvel Comics Universe.

Mysterio may also refer to:

- Mysterio (album), 1992 album by Ian McCulloch
- Rey Misterio (1958–2024), Mexican professional wrestler
- Rey Mysterio (born 1974), Mexican-American professional wrestler
- El Hijo de Rey Misterio (born 1989), Mexican-American professional wrestler, sometimes billed as Rey Misterio
- Dominik Mysterio (born 1997), American professional wrestler and son of Rey Mysterio

== See also ==
- Misterio, a Mexican film
- Mysteria (disambiguation)
- Mysterion (disambiguation)
