= Mystery guest =

Mystery guest may refer to:

- An unknown guest star (usually on a television series)
- A mystery shopper for hotels, that is, an individual employed by hotel rating organizations to pose as a lodger to evaluate the quality of a hotel
- Mystery Guest (round), in the television game show What's My Line?
- "Mystery Guest", 1990 season 3 episode of the animated television series Garfiend and Friends
- "Mystery Guest", a segment on the animated television series Liberty's Kids
- "The Mystery Guest", 2011 episode of the reality television series Rocco's Dinner Party
- Mystery Guest (album), 2008 Taiwanese album by Yoga Lin

== See also ==
- Mystery (disambiguation)
- Guest (disambiguation)
