= Japanese ship Unryū =

At least two warships of Japan have been named Unryū:

- Japanese aircraft carrier Unryū, an Unryū-class aircraft carrier launched in 1943 and sunk in 1944.
- JS Unryū (SS-502), a Sōryū-class submarine launched in 2008.
