= Mystère =

Mystère may refer to:

- Dassault Mystère, a French fighter-bomber
- Martin Mystère, a fictional character
- Mystère (Cirque du Soleil), a Las Vegas circus show
- Mystère (film), a 1983 thriller film
- Mystère (TV miniseries), a 2007 science fiction television miniseries
- Mystère, a 2016 album by the French band La Femme

== See also ==
- Mystere (disambiguation)
