= Holland Norway Lines =

Dutch ferry operator

- Logo of Holland Norway Lines

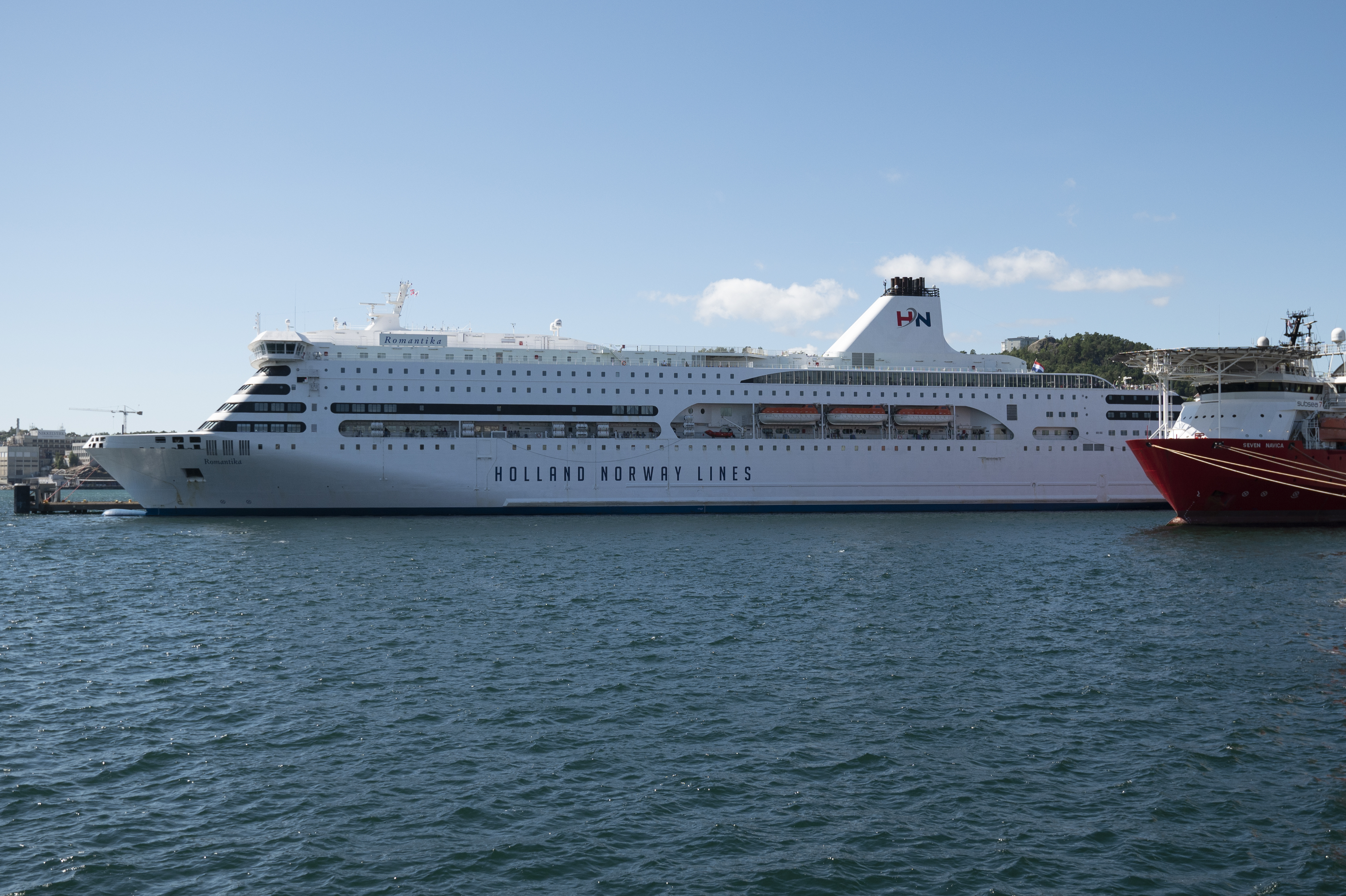
- Romantika in Kristiansand
- Industry: Ferry industry Cruiseferries
- Founded: 2020
- Headquarters: The Netherlands

Holland Norway Lines was a Dutch ferry company which operated a passenger and car ferry service between Emden, Germany and Kristiansand, Norway three times a week.

The company chartered the cruise ferry Romantika from the Estonian Tallink Grupp for an initial period of three years. The ship has a maximum capacity of 2500 passengers and 350 cars. The crossing took about 18 hours.

The company was founded by Bart Cunnen, and Patrick America. The company aimed to operate emissions-free ships by 2027.

On 30 August 2023, the company announced that it would suspend operations due to financial problems, and on 2 September 2023 it filed for bankruptcy in the Netherlands.

== Operations ==
On 7 April 2022, services started between Eemshaven, Netherlands and Kristiansand.

In early 2023 the service from Eemshaven to Kristiansand faced several cancellations because the Romantika was unable to dock in Eemshaven on several occasions. The problem was caused by the fact that since October, Holland Norway Lines no longer had priority to dock at the so-called heavy quay in Eemshaven.

On 23 March 2023, Holland Norway Lines announced in a press release that from 17 April to 31 May they would use Cuxhaven as their temporary departure port. From 1 June 2023 Emden became the new permanent port of departure.
