= All Saints Church, Millbrook =

Church in Cornwall, England

All Saints Church
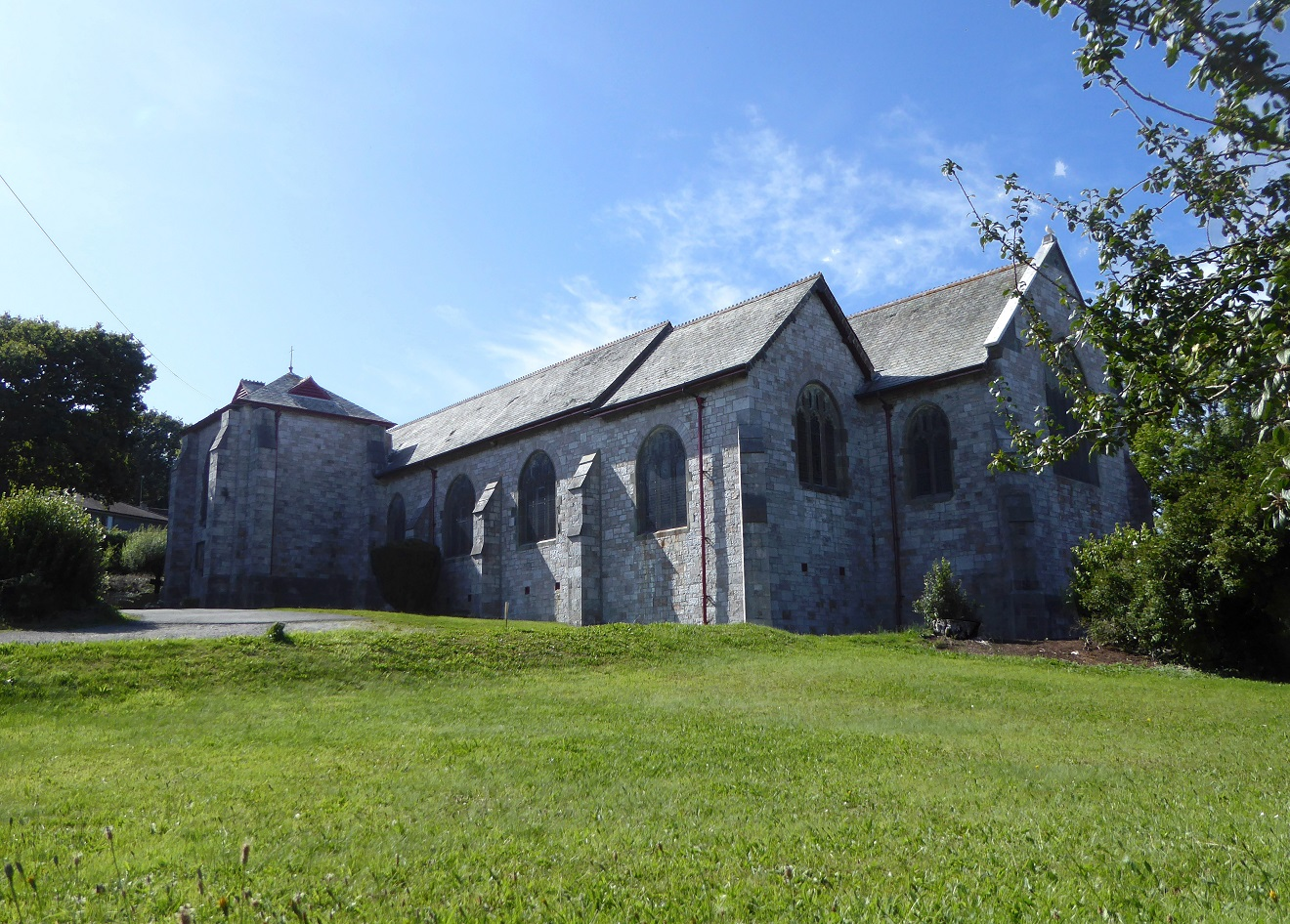

Religion
- Affiliation: Church of England
- Ecclesiastical or organizational status: Active

Location
- Location: Millbrook, Cornwall, England
- Interactive map of All Saints Church
- Coordinates: 50.3507°N 4.2161°W

Architecture
- Architects: Hine and Odgers of Plymouth
- Type: Church
- Completed: 1895

Listed Building – Grade II
- Official name: Church of All Saints
- Designated: 26 January 1987
- Reference no.: 1329134

All Saints Church is a Church of England parish church in Millbrook, Cornwall, England, UK. It was built in 1893–95 and has been Grade II listed since 1987. The war memorial on the edge of the church grounds also became Grade II listed in 2016.

== History ==
Millbrook was originally served by St Mary's and St Julian's Church in the parish of Maker. A chapel of ease was built at Millbrook in 1827, which went on to serve as parish church when the village was made a separate parish in 1869. By the end of the 19th century, the church had become too small to serve the growing population and had also fallen into a dilapidated state, prompting plans for the construction of a replacement. Fundraising began around 1886 when Rev. J. E. G. Farmer, the vicar of Millbrook, and his family donated £1,500 in memory of Mrs. Farmer's father, Captain Yule.

Funds continued to be raised over the next few years and a plot of land gifted by Lord Clinton and Mr. W. D. Boger, the latter of whom also gifted stone from his Plymouth quarry. Both men were on the building committee, which went on to be chaired by Rev. H. W. Millet (successor of Rev. Farmer) and also included Kenelm William Edward Edgcumbe, the 6th Earl of Mount Edgcumbe. Plans for the new church were drawn up by Messrs Hine and Odgers of Plymouth. The contractor hired for its construction was Mr. Philip Blowey of Plymouth, with Mr. S. Collings of Millbrook as clerk of the works.

The foundation stone of All Saints was laid by the Earl of Mount Edgcumbe on 21 September 1893. As the Earl was the Provincial Grand Master of Cornwall and Deputy Grand Master of England, the ceremony was performed with full Masonic honours. In addition to the many members of the public, approximately 300 members of the Masonic brethren arrived from across Cornwall to witness the ceremony. Construction of the church had already commenced approximately two months prior to the event. All Saints was consecrated by the Bishop of Truro, John Gott, on 1 November 1895.

== Architecture ==
All Saints is built of Plymouth limestone, with slate roofs, and dressings and embellishments in Polyphant, Bath and Portland stone. Designed in the Perpendicular style and able to accommodate 560 persons, the church is made up of a nave, chancel with vestry and organ chamber, north and south aisles, and a south porch. The south porch was built as the lower part of an intended tower, however a lack of funds prevented the tower being completed.

Both the octagonal oak pulpit, on a base of Beer stone, and the altar was made by Mr. Herbert Read of Exeter to the designs of the architects. The pulpit was built in memory of Dr. E. Worth. The cost of the altar was covered by funds raised by Mrs. Little, with the altar cross, vases and other items gifted by Mrs. Millet, wife of the vicar. The pine seats of the nave and aisles were made by Mr. J. P. Berry of Plymouth. The east window was gifted by the public in memory to Mr. William Frederick Lapidge of the Royal Navy. Some of the 1827 church's fittings were transferred to the new church, including the bell, font and organ, the latter having been moved to the new church and remodelled at the expense of Miss Thomas of Anderton.

A new organ, built by Messrs Hele & Co of Plymouth, was dedicated at the church on 8 September 1909. On 4 April 1948, the Bishop of Truro, Joseph Hunkin, dedicated a stained glass window and tablet in memory to the men of the parish who died in World War II.
