= Mysterium fidei =

Mysterium fidei may refer to:

- Mysterium fidei (encyclical), 1965 papal encyclical on the Eucharist by Pope Paul VI
- "The mystery of faith" or "a mystery of faith", phrases found in various religious contexts
- Mysterium fidei, title of the principal work of Maurice de la Taille (1872–1933)

== See also ==
- Memorial Acclamation, an acclamation following the Eucharist that uses the phrase
- Words of Institution, Eucharist liturgies sometimes using the phase
- Catechism of the Catholic Church, a book of catechism that includes celebration of Christian mystery
- Sacred mysteries, supernatural phenomena associated with divinity or religion
- Mysterium (disambiguation)
