= Millbrook, Cornwall =

Village in Cornwall, England

Coordinates: 50.348°N 4.217°W

Millbrook: Cornish: Govermelin
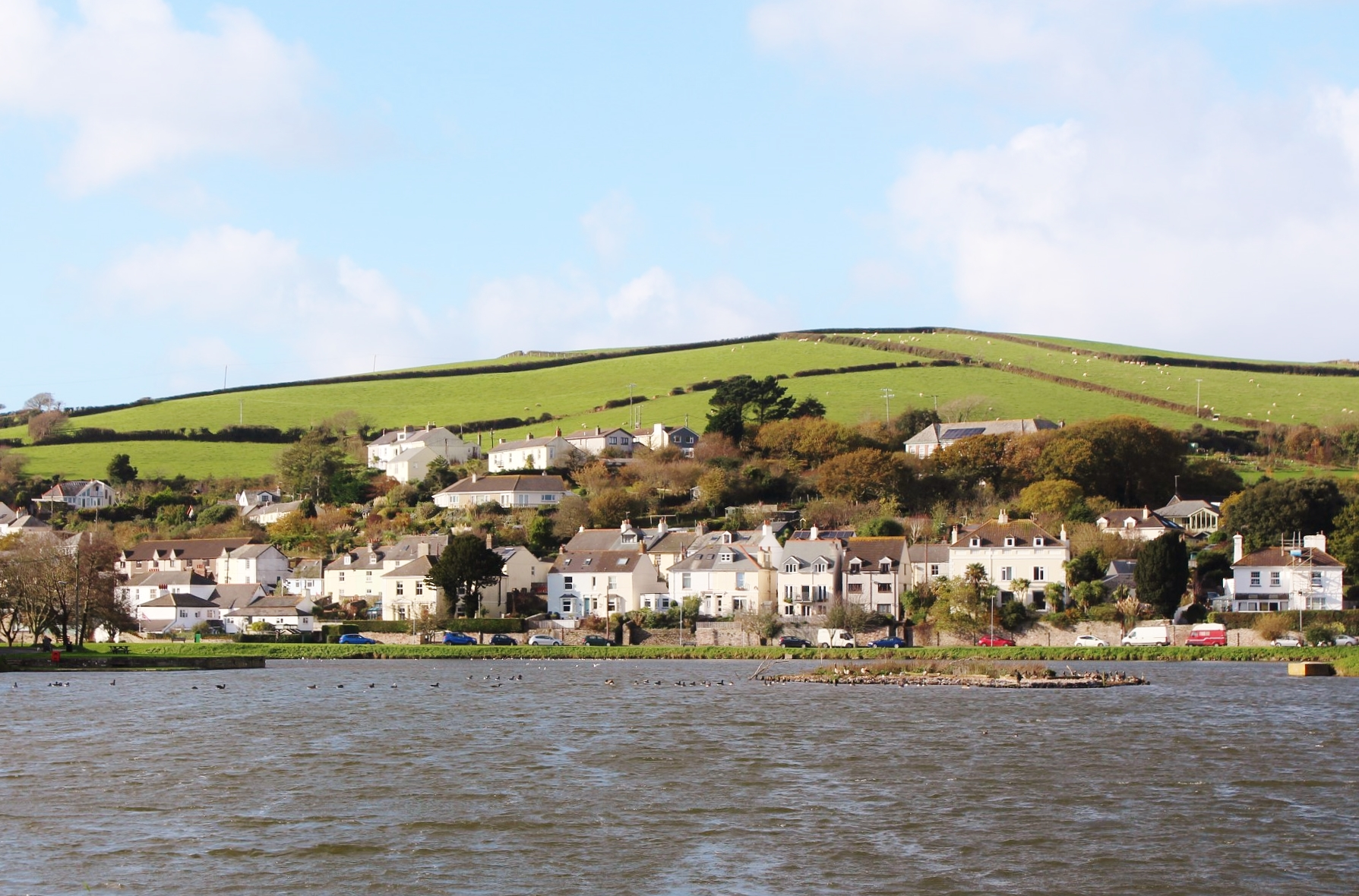
- The village, with the creek in the centre

- Location within Cornwall
- Population: 2,278 (2011)
- OS grid reference: SX423522
- Civil parish: Millbrook
- Unitary authority: Cornwall
- Ceremonial county: Cornwall
- Region: South West
- Country: England
- Sovereign state: United Kingdom
- Post town: TORPOINT
- Postcode district: PL10
- Dialling code: 01752
- Police: Devon and Cornwall
- Fire: Cornwall
- Ambulance: South Western
- UK Parliament: South East Cornwall

Millbrook (Cornish: Govermelin) is a civil parish and village in south-east Cornwall, England, United Kingdom. The village is situated on the Rame Peninsula four miles (6.5 km) south of Saltash. The population of Millbrook was 2,033 in the 2001 census, increasing to 2,214 at the 2011 census. Millbrook is at the head of a tidal creek which has been dammed since 1977 as a flood prevention measure. The resulting pool and wetlands are a birdwatching site.

The seal of the borough of Millbrook was a mill with waterwheel in a stream of water amid trees and hounds, with the legend "Sigillum de Millbrookia".

== Religion and culture ==
The modern parish church is dedicated to All Saints. The parish was created from part of Maker parish in 1869. The village also has a Methodist chapel.

The Black Prince Parade takes place on May Day bank holiday. During mid-morning a procession of dancers and singers parade through Millbrook and the neighbouring villages of Kingsand and Cawsand, stopping at chosen houses and inns on the way. They carry with them a boat decorated with all the available spring flowers. In the evening, the boat is launched onto the water with an accompanying firework display. The ritual has been carried out in Millbrook since the 14th century.

== Sport ==
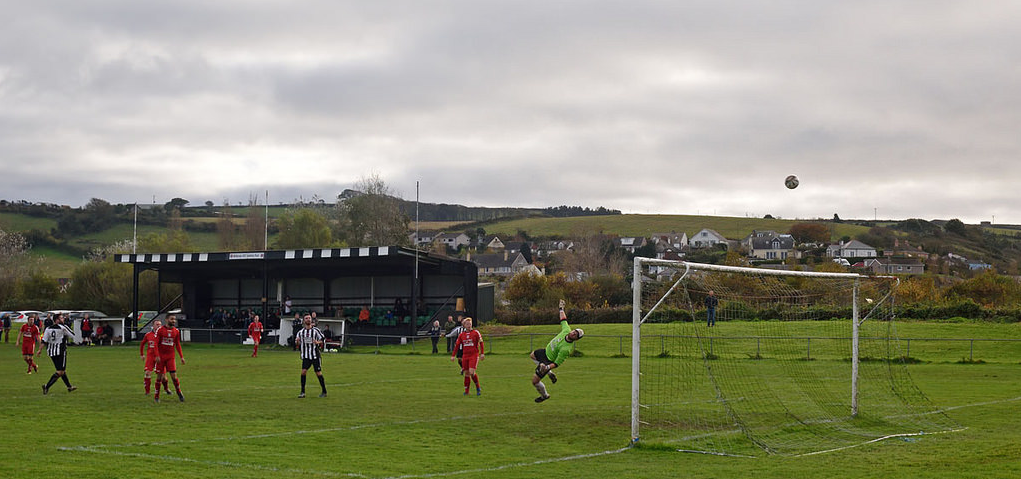
Action from a SWPL match at Jenkins Park, with the view of Millbrook in the background.

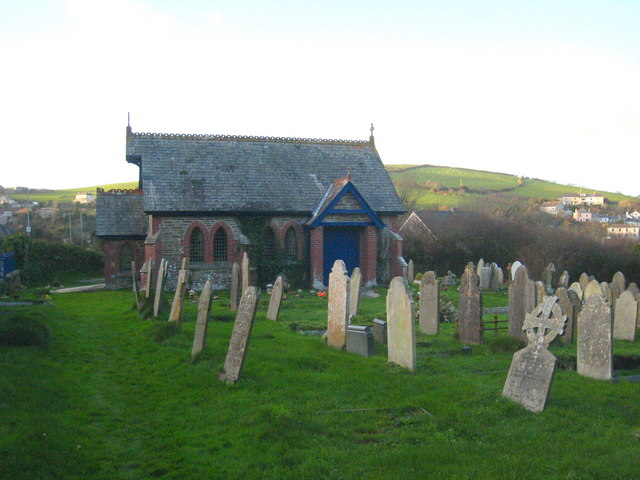
The chapel of rest at Millbrook cemetery

The local football club was founded in 1888 and competes in the South West Peninsula League, which sits at steps 6 and 7 of the National League System. The club plays at Jenkins Park (formerly Mill Park) and have competed in the FA Vase and FA Cup.

Millbrook, along with the rest of the Rame Peninsula is a fishing area, with several fishing areas located in and around the village.

In 2008, sailor and adventurer Pete Goss built a 37-foot Cornish lugger, Spirit of Mystery, with the help of local craftsmen in a shed at Innsworke Mill Boat Yard in Millbrook. The boat is a replica of Mystery, which made a voyage to Australia in from 1854 to 1855 .

=== Cornish wrestling ===
Cornish wrestling tournaments were held at the Rose and Crown in Millbrook.

== Notable residents ==
The former football player Reg Jenkins was born in Millbrook in 1938. During his career, he played for Plymouth Argyle, Exeter City, Torquay United and Rochdale. The local football club plays at Jenkins Park, which was named after him.
