= Mysterious =

Mysterious may refer to:

- Mysterious (album), a 1988 album by Shizuka Kudō
- "Mysterious" (song), a 2005 song by Jentina
- "Mysterious", a song by Moka Only and Jon Rogers from the 2014 album Sex Money Moka
- "Mysterious", a song by Scorpions from the 1999 album Eye II Eye
- Mysterious Walker (1884–1958), American baseball player
- Mysterious (horse) (1970–1988), thoroughbred racehorse

== See also ==
- Mystery (disambiguation)
