= Mysteria =

Mysteria may refer to:

- Mysteria: The Club Experience, a radio station
- Mysteria (city), a temporary city formed during Transformus, an annual arts festival in the Blue Ridge Mountains
- Mysteria (musical group), a musical group by Mark Adam Allison (Phobos), David Evey and Brian Wayy
- "Mysteria" (E Nomine song), a 2003 electronic song
- "Mysteria" (Edguy song), a 2004 heavy metal song
- Mysteria, the first zone of the 2009 video game Henry Hatsworth in the Puzzling Adventure
- "Mysteria" (The Rasmus song), a 2012 pop rock song
- Mysteria (film), a 2011 American thriller film

== See also ==
- Mysterians (disambiguation)
- Mysterio (disambiguation)
- Mysterium (disambiguation)
