= Clara Luciani =

French singer-songwriter and musician (born 1992)

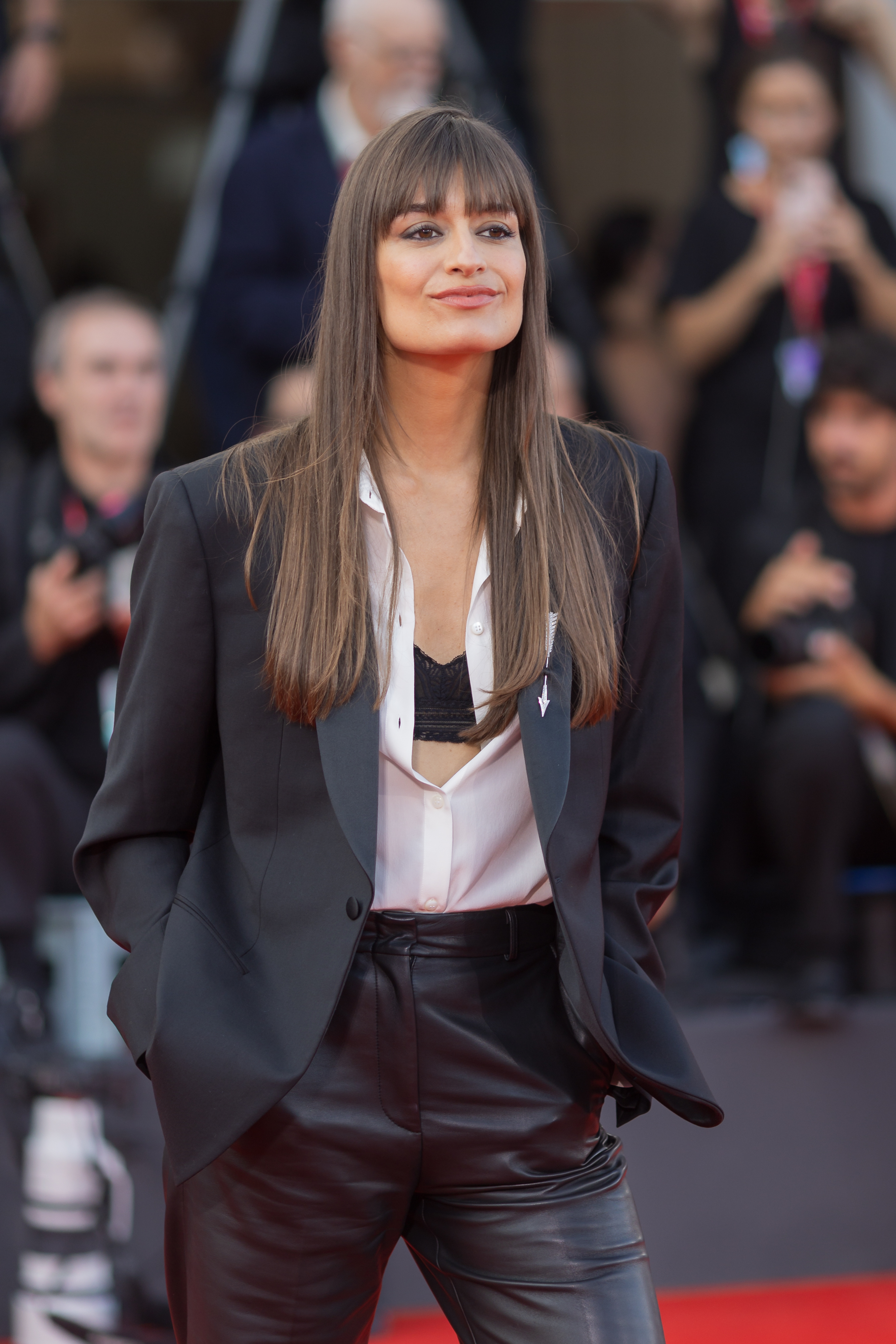
- Luciani in 2025

Background information
- Born: 10 July 1992 (age 33); Martigues, France
- Genres: French pop
- Occupations: Singer-songwriter; musician
- Instruments: Vocals; guitar
- Years active: 2011–present
- Formerly of: La Femme; Hologram
- Spouse: Alex Kapranos (m. 2023)
- Website: claraluciani.com
- Children: 1

Clara Luciani (French pronunciation: [klaʁa lutʃ(j)ani], [lysjani]; Italian: [ˈklaːra luˈtʃaːni]; born 10 July 1992) is a French singer-songwriter and musician.

== Early life ==
Luciani comes from a Corsican family. Her grandfather, whom she did not know, was from Ajaccio. Luciani grew up in Septèmes-les-Vallons, in the suburbs of Marseille. Before her career in music, she studied art history and performed various jobs, including pizza chef, babysitter, sales at Zara, and teaching ESL.

== Career ==
In 2011, she became one of the vocalists in the rock band La Femme. She sang two songs on their 2013 album, Psycho Tropical Berlin. After leaving the group, she formed the duo Hologram with Maxime Sokolinski.

In 2015–2016, Luciani accompanied singer Raphaël onstage for his Somnambules tour.

In 2017, she performed with Benjamin Biolay and released her first EP, Monstre d'amour, recorded with Benjamin Lebeau (The Shoes) and Ambroise Willaume (Revolver), to critical acclaim.

On 6 April 2018, Luciani released her first studio album, Sainte-Victoire, which was well received by the press. The following winter, she toured Australia, performing at the So Frenchy So Chic festival series in Adelaide, Melbourne, Sydney, and Brisbane. She released a second album, Cœur, in 2021.

Luciani has cited Nico, PJ Harvey, Patti Smith, Françoise Hardy, Serge Gainsbourg, Michel Legrand, Paul McCartney, Sonic Youth, and Pixies as influences.

== Personal life ==
Since 2019, she has been in a relationship with Scottish musician Alex Kapranos, frontman of the rock band Franz Ferdinand. The couple married in Scotland at the end of May 2023. They have one child, a son, born in September 2023.

== Discography ==
=== Studio albums ===
List of studio albums, with selected details, chart positions and certifications
Title	Details	Charts				Certification
Title	Details	FRA	BEL (Fl)	BEL (Wa)	SWI	Certification
Sainte-Victoire	Released: 6 April 2018; Label: Romance Musique	4	—	12	74	SNEP: 2× Platinum
Cœur	Released: 11 June 2021; Label: Romance Musique	1	101	1	3	SNEP: 2× Platinum
Mon sang	Released: 15 November 2024; Label: Romance Musique	3	—	4	8	

=== EPs ===
List of extended plays, with selected details
Title	Details
Monstre d'amour	Released: 28 April 2017; Label: Romance Musique

=== Singles ===
==== As lead artist ====
Year	Title	Charts		Certifications	Album
Year	Title	FRA	BEL (Wa)	Certifications	Album
2018	"La baie"	—	38		Sainte-Victoire
2019	"La grenade"	22	5	SNEP: Diamond	Sainte-Victoire
2019	"Nue"	118	12	SNEP: Gold	Sainte-Victoire
2020	"Ma sœur"	151	—		Sainte-Victoire [Super-édition]
2020	"Summer Wine" (Alex Kapranos & Clara Luciani)	—	—		Non-album single
2021	"Le reste"	29	2	SNEP: Platinum	Cœur
2021	"Respire encore"	44	12	SNEP: Gold	Cœur
2024	"Tout pour moi"	94	21		Mon sang
2025	"Courage"	—	17		Mon sang
2025	"Cette vie"	158	33		Mon sang
2025	"Le Mur"	—	—		Non-album single

==== As featured artist ====
Year	Title	Charts	Certifications	Album
Year	Title	FRA	Certifications	Album
2016	"Avant tu riais" (Nekfeu feat. Clara Luciani)	57	SNEP: Platinum	Nekfeu album Cyborg

=== Other charted songs ===
Year	Title	Charts		Album
Year	Title	FRA	BEL (Wa)	Album
2021	"Amour toujours"	130	10	Cœur
2021	"Cœur"	181	21	Cœur
2021	"Tout le monde (sauf toi)"	199	15	Cœur
