= Eemshaven =

- Seaport
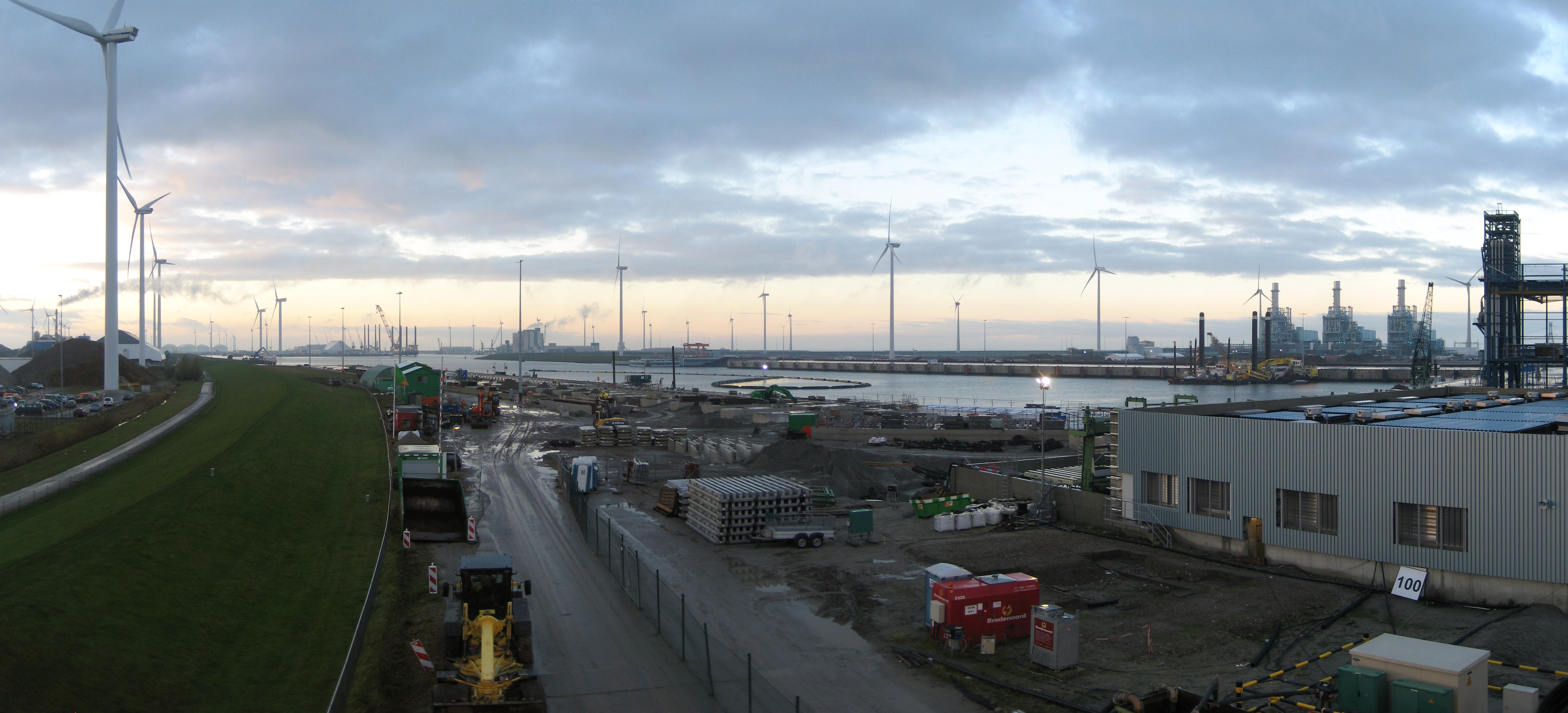
- Port area

- Location of Eemshaven in the province of Groningen Eemshaven (Netherlands)
- Coordinates: 53°26′54″N 6°49′52″E
- Country: Netherlands
- Province: Groningen
- Municipality: Het Hogeland

Area
  - Total: 15.02 km^{2} (5.80 sq mi)
- Elevation: 1.2 m (3.9 ft)

Population (2021)
  - Total: 5
  - Density: 0.33/km^{2} (0.86/sq mi)
- Time zone: UTC+1 (CET)
  - Summer (DST): UTC+2 (CEST)
- Postal code: 9979
- Dialing code: 0595
- Website: Official website

Eemshaven (Dutch pronunciation: [eːmsˈɦaːvə(n)]; English: Ems Harbor) is a seaport in the province of Groningen in the north of the Netherlands. In 1968, the Dutch government declared the Ems estuary (Eemsmond) to be an economic key region. One of the key developments for the region was the construction of a seaport called Eemshaven. The port was officially opened by Queen Juliana in 1973. Industry and shipping were slow to develop at the site.

In 2013, a ferry service connects to the German island of Borkum. A ferry service to Rosyth, Scotland, was to start by late October 2019. The plan was officially abandoned in 2020.

A number of power plants operate at the site. Both Electrabel and NUON operate a gas-fired power plant there while RWE Innogy operates a wind farm at the site RWE operates a coal-fired plant.

The static inverter station of HVDC NorNed is situated at Eemshaven. One endpoint of the COBRAcable HVDC transmission line to Esbjerg, Denmark is also planned to be built here.

Eemshaven is the landfall point for a high-speed transatlantic fiber-optic cable that connects the U.S. and Europe.

== Google data center ==
On 23 September 2014, Google announced that it plans to spend $773 million building a data center. Since 2022 this datacenter is up and running.

== Ferry Eemshaven - Kristiansand ==
The ferry connection from Eemshaven to Kristiansand started April 2022 the 2020 founded cruise-ferry company Holland Norway Lines operated one ship, the MS Romantika on a route between Eemshaven and Kristiansand. The charter of the ship was announced on 1 November 2021, and was due to last three years with two one-year extensions. This route has now closed and the MS Romantika is moored at Emden in Germany.

== Gallery ==
Picture of Eemshaven

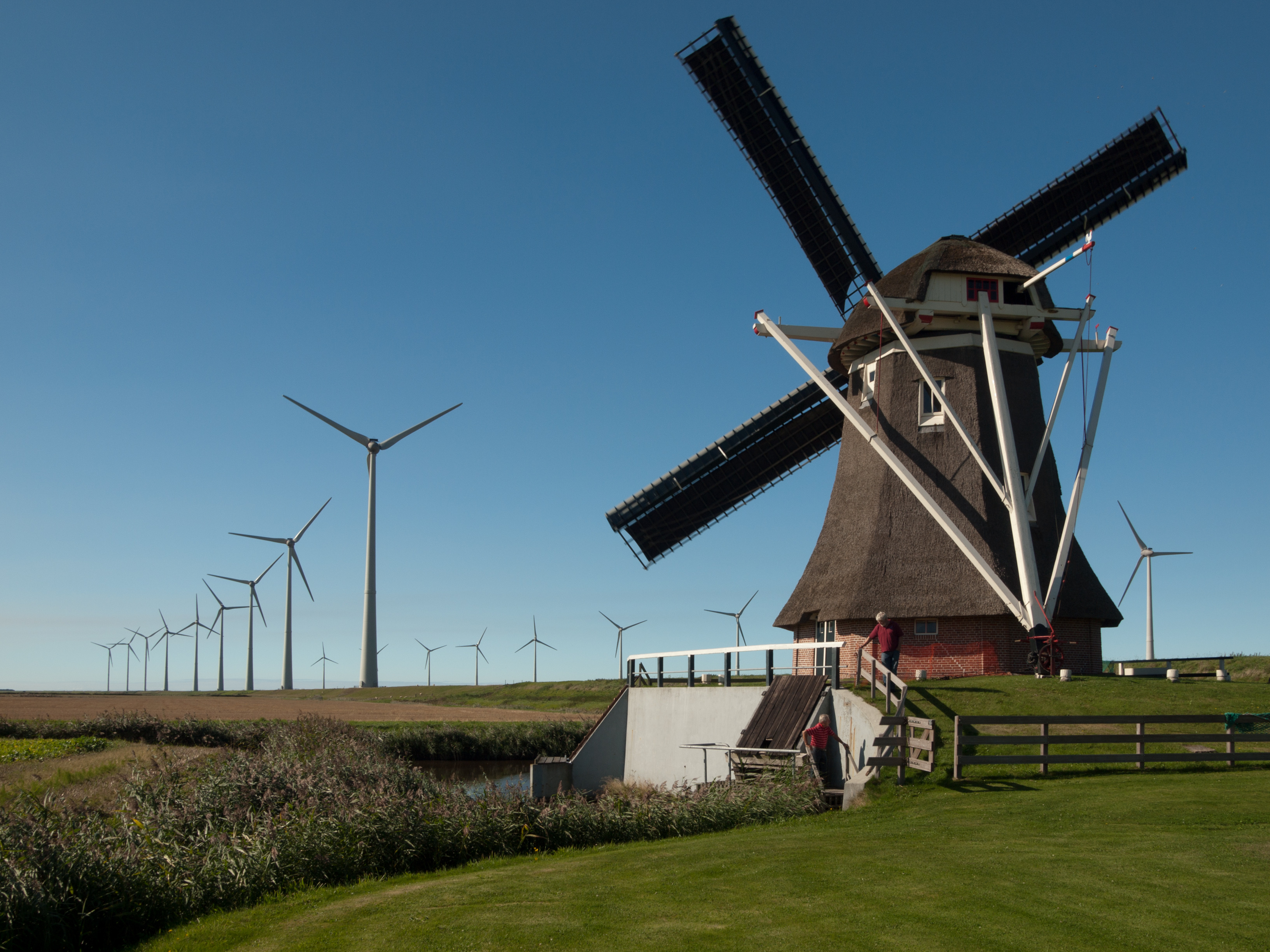
Smock mill Goliath in front of the wind farm Growind

Opening 1973, newsreel

== See also ==
- Holland Norway Lines
