= Romantika =

2002 ferry

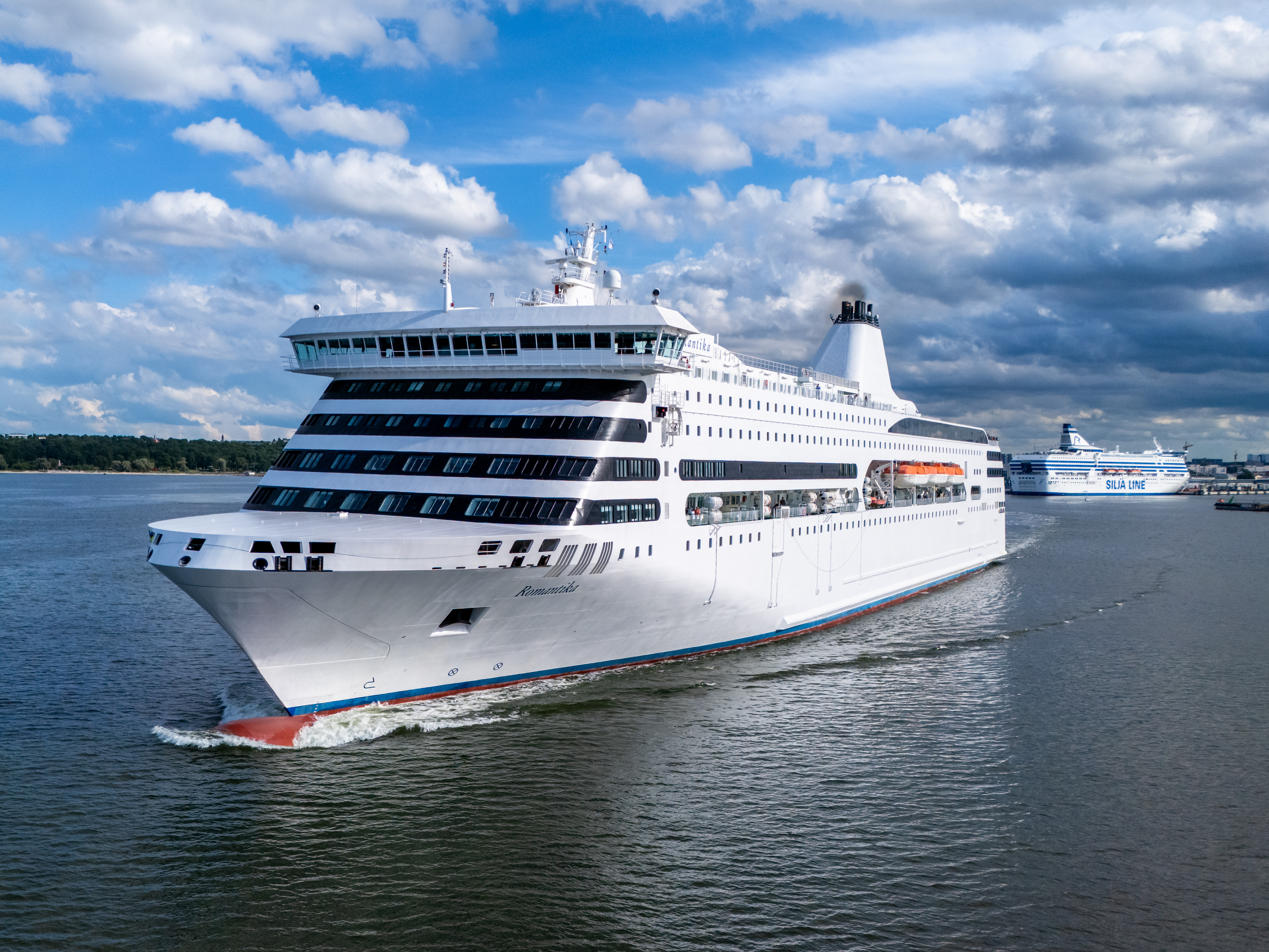
- Romantika in 2026

History

Latvia
- Name: Romantika
- Owner: Tallink
- Operator: Tallink
- Port of registry: 2002–09: Tallinn, Estonia; 2009–15: Riga, Latvia; 2015–17: Tallinn, Estonia; 2017–22: Riga, Latvia; 2022–23: Eemshaven Netherlands; 2023–present: Riga Latvia
- Route: Laid off in Paljassaare
- Ordered: 30 August 2000
- Builder: Aker Finnyards, Rauma, Finland
- Yard number: 433
- Laid down: 23 May 2001
- Launched: 14 December 2001
- Christened: 14 December 2001
- Acquired: 10 May 2002
- In service: 21 May 2002
- Identification: Call sign: YLBT; IMO number: 9237589; MMSI number: 244524000

General characteristics
- Class & type: Romantika
- Tonnage: 40,803 GT; 4,500 t DWT
- Length: 192.90 m (632 ft 10 in)
- Beam: 29.00 m (95 ft 2 in)
- Draught: 6.50 m (21 ft 4 in)
- Decks: 10
- Ice class: 1 A Super
- Installed power: 4 × Wärtsilä 16V32 diesels, combined 26,240 kW (35,190 hp)
- Speed: 22 knots (41 km/h; 25 mph)
- Capacity: 2,500 passengers; 2,172 passenger berths; 300 cars; 1,000 lanemeters

Romantika (Note: In Latvian, Estonian and Lithuanian languages "Romantika" means "Romance") is a cruiseferry owned by the Estonian ferry company Tallink. The ship's most recent use was on the Tallinn-Stockholm route.

== History ==
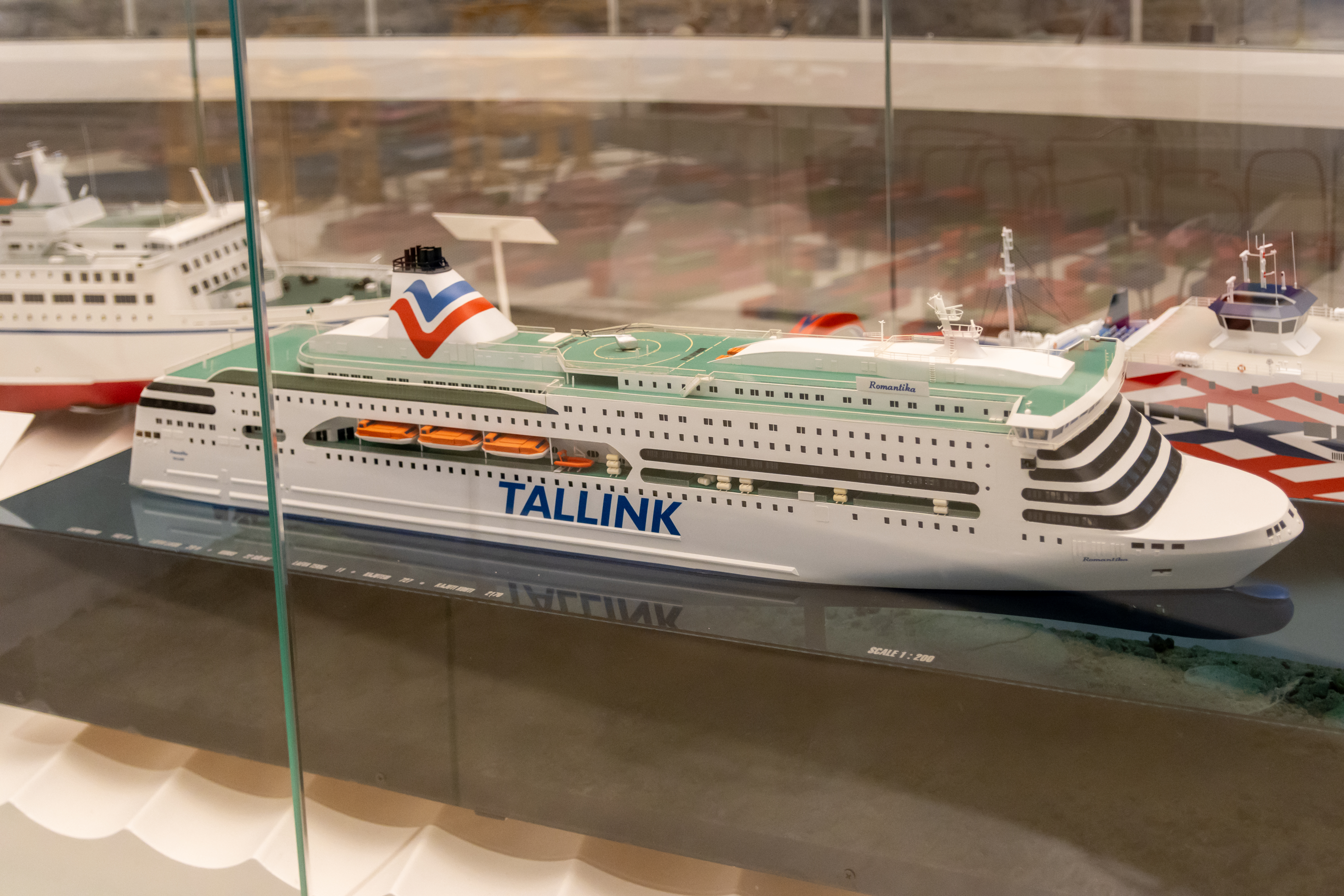
Model of the ship at Estonian Maritime Museum

Romantika was built in 2002 by Aker Finnyards, Rauma and she was the first ever newbuilding to be delivered to Tallink. Between 2002 and 2006 the Romantika was used on the Helsinki–Tallinn route, until she was replaced by the new Galaxy. After this she was transferred to the Tallinn–Stockholm route, sailing parallel with her sister Victoria I.

After the delivery of Baltic Queen the Romantika was transferred to the Stockholm–Riga route in May 2009. Simultaneously with this she was changed from Estonian to Latvian registry. When the Silja Europa was chartered out from Tallink service in August 2014, the Romantika returned to the Tallinn–Mariehamn–Stockholm route.

In December 2016, with the return of Silja Europa, Tallink reorganized the routes of their ferries and Romantika was transferred to the Stockholm - Riga route from December 12.

From July to September 2021 Romantika was chartered to Morocco's Tanger-Med Port Authority for services between Morocco and Sète in France.

On 13 October 2021, she arrived in Glasgow to provide accommodation for people attending the COP26 summit.

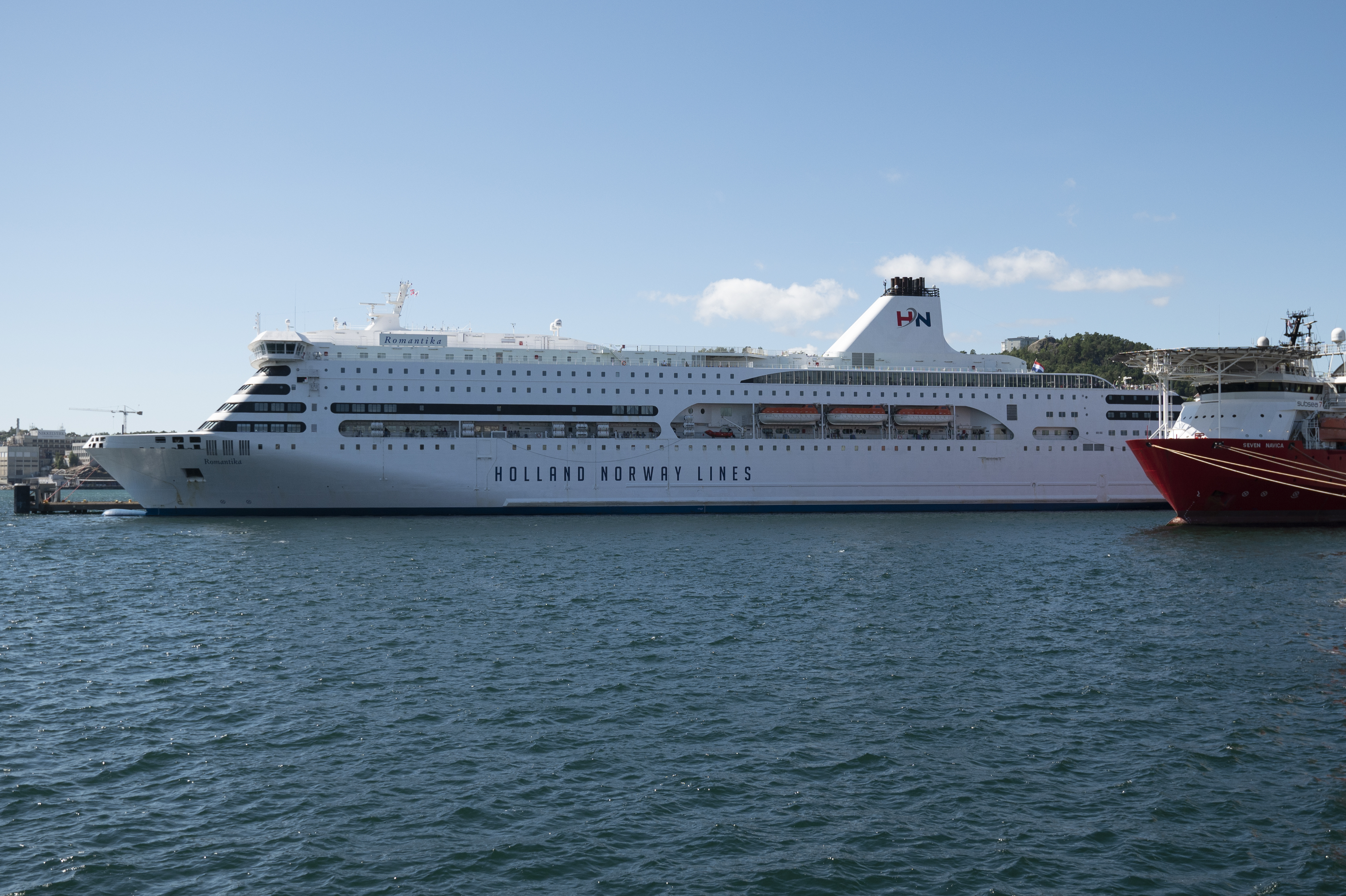
Romantika in Holland Norway Lines colours

In April 2022, Romantika entered service with Holland Norway Lines on a Kristiansand - Eemshaven routing on charter. This charter was announced on 1 November 2021, and was due to last three years with two one-year extensions. Holland Norway Lines ceased operations on 30 August 2023 due to financial difficulties, and as of that date Romantika was docked in Emden. The charter agreement for Romantika was terminated on 1 September 2023, before the charter agreement's normal expiry date.

For summer 2026, Romantika joined Baltic Queen on the Tallinn–Stockholm route, skipping a stop in Mariehamn.
