= Clémence Quélennec =

French singer, songwriter, pianist, and composer (born 1991)

- Born: 6 March 1991 (age 35); Quimper, France
- Other name: Aja
- Occupations: Singer; songwriter; pianist; composer
- Years active: 2003–present

Clémence Quélennec (born 6 March 1991, Quimper, France) is a French singer, songwriter, pianist, and composer. Quélennec was primary lead singer for the French "psychedelic-rock" band La Femme approximately 10 years, and became solo in 2019 under the stage name Aja.

Clémence Quélennec's vocals have been described as "dreamy and urgent" as well as "coquettish".

== La Femme ==
For the band La Femme, Clémence Quélennec was discovered by the originators, via MySpace, at age 17. Quélennec became part of La Femme's small group of studio and conceptual singing leads. Band manager Stéphane Le Sciellour, however, specified that Quélennec "...is La Femme's singer. She’s performing all of the live songs; she goes on tour with them. She is the singer of the band."

During Clémence Quélennec's time with La Femme, band manager Marlon Magnée noted that Quélennec resembled "...a Vogue cover."

== Aja ==
In 2019, Clémence Quélennec chose to leave La Femme to produce her own work in Morocco, and isolate herself in the wilderness. Adopting the stage name Aja, Quélennec has since self-produced an assortment of original compositions, animated shorts, and vocal songs.

Clémence Quélennec's focus is ambient sound. Quélennec has specified that at times her work is directly influenced by the audio of moss, calm rains, and female voices.

in 2024, she joined the Villa Medici.
