= Mysterians =

Mysterians may refer to:

- The Mysterians – 1957 Japanese science fiction movie, and the eponymous aliens
- ? and the Mysterians – rock group best known for the 1966 hit "96 Tears"
- Adherents of new mysterianism, a philosophy proposing that certain problems, like the nature of consciousness, may never be explained

== See also ==
- Mysteria (disambiguation)
- Mysterion (disambiguation)
- Mysterons (disambiguation)
