= Baltic Queen =

2008 ferry

- Baltic Queen in Stockholm on June 2023

History

Estonia
- Name: Baltic Queen
- Owner: Tallink
- Operator: Tallink
- Port of registry: Tallinn, Estonia
- Route: Tallinn–Mariehamn–Stockholm
- Ordered: 11 April 2007
- Builder: STX Europe, Rauma, Finland
- Cost: €180 million
- Yard number: 1365
- Laid down: 22 April 2008
- Launched: 5 December 2008
- Acquired: 16 April 2009
- In service: 24 April 2009
- Identification: Call sign: ESJJ; MMSI number: 276779000; IMO number: 9443255
- Status: In service

General characteristics
- Class & type: Galaxy class cruiseferry
- Tonnage: 48,915 GT
- Length: 212.10 m (695 ft 10 in)
- Beam: 29.00 m (95 ft)
- Decks: 12
- Ice class: 1 A Super
- Installed power: 4 × Wärtsilä 16V32 diesels; combined 32,000 kW (43,000 hp)
- Speed: 24.5 kn (45 km/h; 28 mph)
- Capacity: 2,800 passengers; 2,500 berths; 1,130 lanemeters

Baltic Queen is a cruiseferry owned by the Estonia-based ferry operator Tallink. She was built by the STX Europe shipyard in Rauma, Finland. The ship operates the Tallinn-Mariehamn-Stockholm route.

== Concept and construction ==
Initially known under the project name Cruise 5, Baltic Queen was ordered from (what was then) Aker Yards shipyard in Rauma, Finland in April 2007. She is a sister ship to MS Galaxy, Romantika and Baltic Princess and Tallink's fifth newbuilt cruiseferry. The ship's planned route was a mystery to the general public for a long time, until on 11 November 2008 Tallink revealed that she would be placed on the Tallinn–Stockholm service on completion. The ship was launched from drydock and officially named Baltic Queen on 5 December 2008. By this time the shipyard had been renamed STX Europe. Tallink took delivery of the ship on 16 April 2009.

== Service history ==
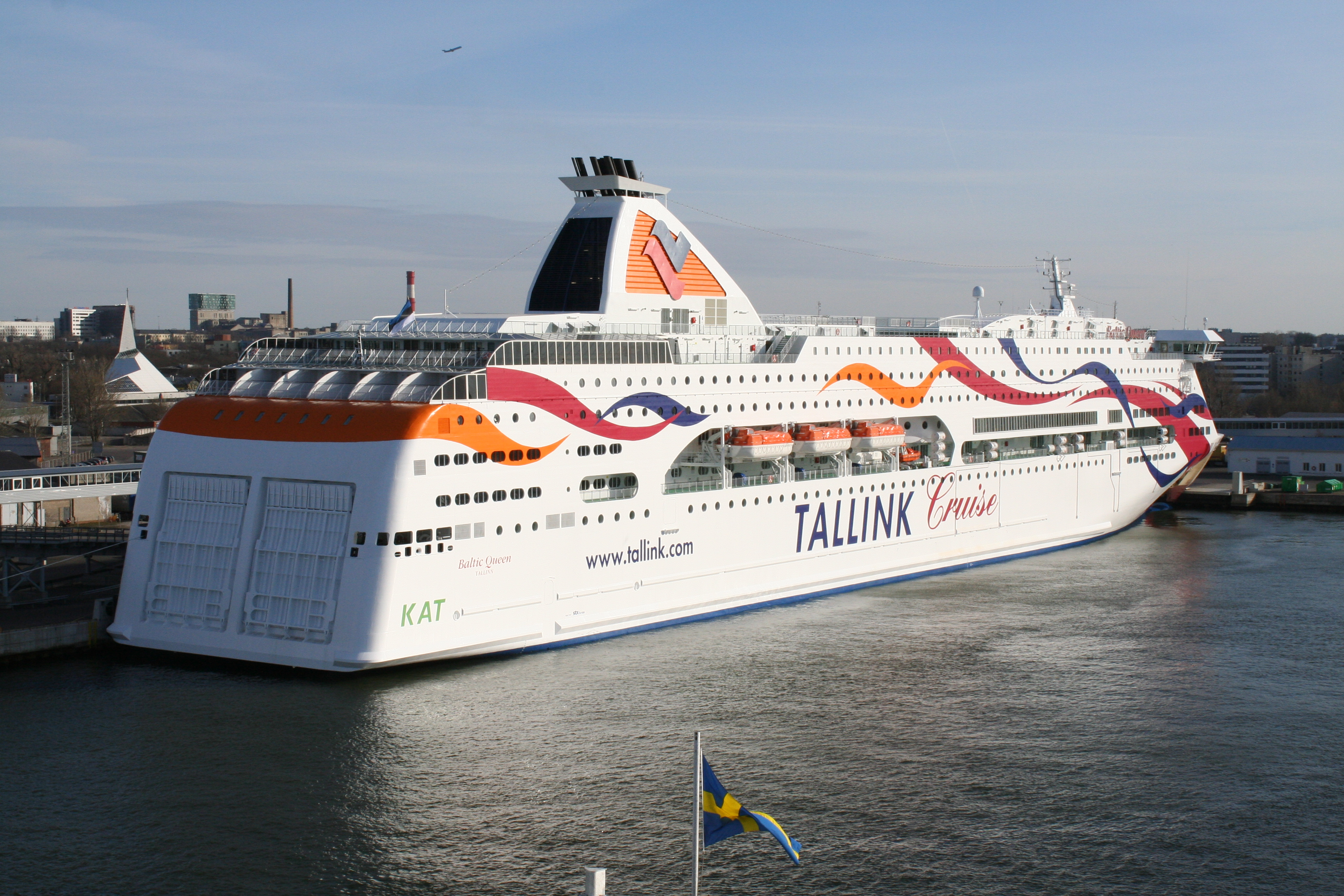
Baltic Queen in Tallinn on 23 April 2009

Baltic Queen entered service on the Tallinn–Mariehamn–Stockholm route on 24 April 2009, replacing Tallink's first newbuilt ship Romantika, which was moved to the Riga–Stockholm service. Baltic Queen's Tallink Silja fleetmate Silja Europa encountered problems with her steering on 22 November 2009, and she had to be taken out of service for repairs. As a result, the Baltic Queen was moved to the Turku–Mariehamn–Stockholm service as a temporary replacement from 26 November until 11 December 2009. From 7 August 2014 the ship started sailing from Tallinn to Helsinki, because Silja Europa was chartered to an Australian company due to its high fuel costs. Baltic Queen was then replaced with Romantika on the Tallinn-Mariehamn-Stockholm line. At the end of 2018 once again it is on the Tallinn–Mariehamn–Stockholm route.
