= Psycho Tropical Berlin =

Studio album by La Femme
- Released: April 8, 2013
- Genre: Indie pop, psychedelic pop, surf rock
- Length: 58:09
- Label: Barclay, Universal, Born Bad Records
- Producer: La Femme, Samy Osta

La Femme chronology
Psycho Tropical Berlin (2013)	Mystère (2016)

Psycho Tropical Berlin is the debut studio album by French band La Femme. It was released on April 8, 2013 under Barclay Records.

== Track listing ==
Psycho Tropical Berlin – Standard edition
No.	Title	Length
1.	"Antitaxi"	4:09
2.	"Amour dans le motu"	4:39
3.	"La Femme"	3:02
4.	"Interlude"	2:39
5.	"Hypsoline"	3:15
6.	"Sur La Planche 2013"	3:47
7.	"It's Time to Wake Up (2023)"	6:51
8.	"Nous étions deux"	6:07
9.	"Packshot"	2:56
10.	"Saisis la corde"	5:29
11.	"Le Blues de Françoise"	4:36
12.	"Si un jour"	2:38
13.	"La femme ressort"	5:23
14.	"Welcome America"	2:26
Total length:		57:57

Psycho Tropical Berlin – Deluxe edition (bonus tracks)
No.	Title	Length
15.	"Oh Baby Doll"	3:07
16.	"Witchcraft"	3:49
17.	"Witch Dub"	3:49
18.	"Jaded Future - Future Las"	4:16
Total length:		70:58

Notes

- "Oh Baby Doll" is a cover of the 1957 song by Chuck Berry.

== In popular culture ==
The track "Sur la planche" was used in a commercial for the Renault Captur.

The track "Sur la planche" was used in "Julie", season 1, episode 3 of the French series The Returned in 2012.

The track "Hypsoline" is featured as the ending credit song in the 2014 horror movie As Above, So Below.

The track "Si Un Jour" was used during the end credits for the Netflix series Lovesick.

The track "La Femme Ressort" was used during the short film Crème Caramel.

The track "La Femme" was featured as the soundtrack of the Yves Saint Laurent Paris fall/winter 2015/2016 fashion show.

The track “It`s Time to Wake Up 2023” was used in the movie Archive in 2020.

The track "La Femme Ressort" was used in the 2018 Thai fantasy/mystery TV series Girl from Nowhere.

== Critical reception ==
Professional ratings
Review scores
Source	Rating
Beats Per Minute	81%
Consequence	C+
Drowned in Sound	8/10 stars
NME	3/5 stars

Psycho Tropical Berlin was met with generally positive reviews from critics. Writing for NME, Huw Nesbitt praised the album's versatility: "[Psycho Tropical Berlin] brings together influences of ’50s Americana, ’60s French pop and ’80s synthpop and coldwave quite marvellously." However, Newbitt also criticized the album for dwelling on these influences: "[The album's] constant rehashing of the past creates a dull Groundhog Day effect." In her review of the album for Drowned in Sound, Kat Waplington noted the albums fusions of surf pop and cold wave with "a general Halloween vibe." Walpington concluded by emphasizing the album's potential to appeal to non-French speakers: "Whether or not you can be bothered to translate the lyrics, their manic, rollercoaster pop and fierce hooks should be enough of a draw for the most Anglophone listener."
