= Fushigi =

Fushigi is Japanese for "mystery" or "secret" and may also refer to:

== Music ==
- Fushigi (album), 1986 Japanese pop music album by Akina Nakamori
- "Fushigi" (song), 2021 single by Gen Hoshino
- "Fushigi", song by Japanese rock band Spitz SazanamiCD 2007
- "Fushigi", single by RC Succession 1984

== Other uses ==
- Fushigi (Helix), episode of the US TV series
- Fushigi, an online retailer of 'magic gravity' balls for use in contact juggling
- Fushigi Yamada (山田 ふしぎ; born 1959), Japanese voice actress
- Fushigi Yûgi, 1992-6 Japanese manga series
- Toei Fushigi Comedy Series
