= Mystere incident =

Gaming controversy

The Mystere incident was an EverQuest controversy revolving around a player named "Mystere", banned from the game by Verant (EverQuest's developer) over a controversial role-playing story.

== Summary ==
Mystere, a male player on the Brell Serilis server in EverQuest who roleplayed and posted both as the female dark elf "Mystere" and, less frequently, a male Iksar character "Vhasst", wrote a fan fiction story which depicted the rape of a dark elf girl of "barely 14 seasons". This story was posted under the name "Vhasst" on July 11, 2000 to third-party Brell Serilis server boards not affiliated with Verant or Sony.

At some point afterwards, an anonymous party contacted Verant complaining about Mystere's story. On October 4, 2000, Mystere was abruptly kicked out of EverQuest, and the story was soon after removed from the IGN message board where it was originally posted. Upon contacting Mystere, George Scotto, head of customer service, informed him that he had been banned. According to Mystere:

He told me that I had been banned for a very disturbing story I had written. I was further told that Sony "didn't want my kind of people" playing their game. After attempting to defend myself by saying that it was a roleplay story only, and wasn't even posted on their boards, I was informed that the council had made their decision and it was immutable.

== Response ==
=== Response by critics and academics ===
This incident was discussed in two GameSpot articles under News and Features about the EverQuest: The Ruins of Kunark expansion. The first, on October 6, 2000, was a mention of the incident and the stir it had caused in the EverQuest gaming community. The second, on October 10, was a Q&A with Sony / Verant's John Smedley to get the publisher's perspective on what had occurred and inspired a Penny Arcade cartoon as well as a week-long story arc in the PvP webcomic.

=== Response by the developers ===
The incident led to the removal of a quest in the game which requires the player to murder a pregnant halfling (due to criticism that the quest was as violent as anything in Mystere's story), and it became the subject of academic papers. Some years later, on February 16, 2006, John Smedley brought up the incident again on his blog. In his post, he claims that Verant took the heat silently over the debacle because the full story could not be disclosed to the public, and involved allegations of criminal behavior:

...we couldn't tell the real story, which involved one player accusing this banned player of something that, if true, would have crossed major real-life moral and legal lines. I personally spoke with the person accused and there was enough that made me uncomfortable to decide the right thing to do was to keep this person out of our games altogether. The "fan fiction" story this player wrote certainly was a part of this decision, particularly when combined with the accusation made in-game...
