= Lenneborg =

General cargo ship built in 2008

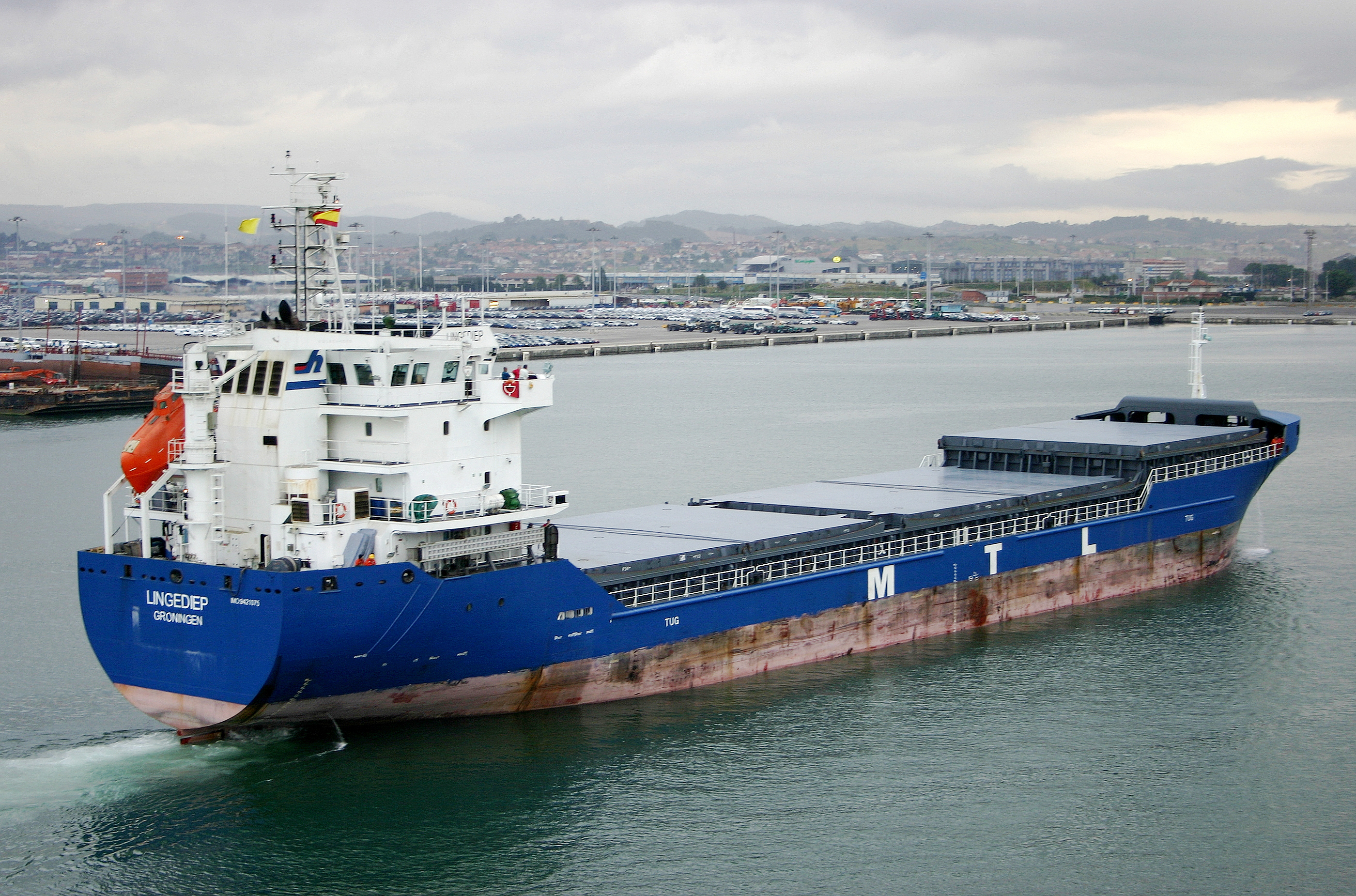
- mv Lingediep in 2009

History
- Name: 2008: Lingediep; 2017: Lenneborg; 2018: Manisa Bella; 2020: Lenneborg
- Owner: 2008: Feederlines; 2017: Wagenborg Shipping
- Operator: 2008: MTL Duisburg; 2017: Wagenborg Shipping
- Port of registry: 2008: Groningen, Netherlands; 2011: Monrovia, Liberia; 2017: Delfzijl, Netherlands
- Builder: Nanjing Huatai Shipyard Co. Ltd., Nanjing
- Yard number: 05-04-04
- Laid down: 30 January 2007
- Launched: 12 March 2008
- Completed: 31 July 2008
- Identification: IMO number: 9421075; Callsign: PHPX, A8ZO6, PHMK, PCGV

General characteristics
- Type: Single Decker
- Tonnage: 5,598 gt, 8,112 dwt
- Length: 108.2 metres (355 ft)
- Beam: 18.2 metres (60 ft)
- Draft: 7.1 metres (23 ft)
- Depth: 9 metres (30 ft)
- Decks: 1
- Ice class: E2 / 1B
- Installed power: 3000 kW
- Propulsion: MaK diesel engine, type 6M32C
- Speed: 11.5 kn
- Capacity: 10194 cbm

Lenneborg (formerly named Manisa Bella and Lingediep), is a general cargo vessel, registered in Delfzijl, Netherlands, having previously been registered in Monrovia and Groningen. The ship was built in China, being delivered to her first owners in 2008. It delivers cargo around northern Africa and Europe to as far north as Oulu, Finland.

== Description ==
The single-deck ship was built in August 2008, and measures 108 metres (354 ft) by 18 metres (59 ft) with a gross tonnage of 5,598. The ship has three holds with a hatch strength of 2.2 t/m^{2} and tanktop strength of 15 t/m^{2}. Hold 1 measures 15.2 x 18.9 x 11.2 m, hold 2 measures 15.2 x 29.4 x 9.1 m, and hold 3 measures 15.2 x 27.3 x 9.1 m.
