= La Femme (band) =

French psych-punk rock band

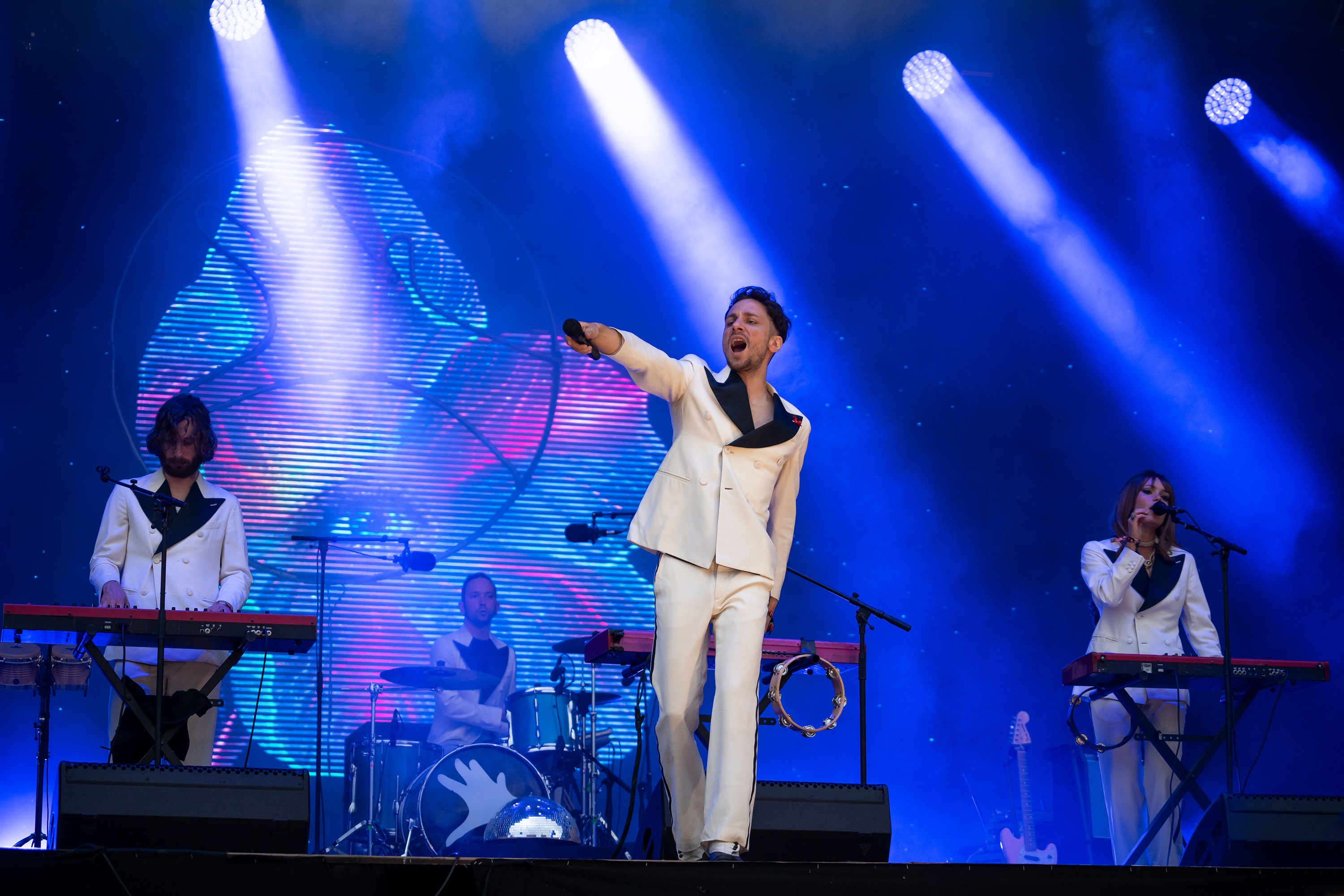
- La Femme performing in 2023

Background information
- Origin: Biarritz, Nouvelle-Aquitaine, France
- Genres: New wave; cold wave; krautrock; psychedelic rock; psychedelic pop; surf rock; yé-yé
- Years active: 2010–present
- Labels: Les Disques Pointus; Barclay; Born Bad Records; Third Side Records
- Members: Sacha Got; Marlon Magnée; Sam Lefèvre; Noé Delmas; Fanny Luzignant; Lucas Nunez Ritter; Michelle Blades
- Past members: Clémence Quélennec; Clara Luciani; Ysé Grospiron; Jane Peynot; Marilou Chollet
- Website: lafemmemusic.com

La Femme are a French rock band established by guitarist Sacha Got and keyboard player Marlon Magnée in 2010 in Biarritz. Several members joined later, including former lead singer Clémence Quélennec (until 2019), bass player Sam Lefevre, drummer Noé Delmas, and Lucas Nunez. Other past members include Clara Luciani, Jane Peynot and Marilou Chollet.

The band's music has been described as synthetic and hypnotic. It mixes elements of cold wave, punk, and yéyé, with musical influence from artists such as Sparks, The Velvet Underground, and Kraftwerk.

La Femme released three EPs from 2010 to 2013, titled La Femme EP, La Podium #1, and La Femme. Their debut full-length, Psycho Tropical Berlin, was released on 8 April 2013. La Femme earned the French award Victoires de la Musique in the category "Album revelation" in February 2014. Their second album, Mystère received some international acclaim.

On 2 April 2021, the group released their third album, Paradigmes, featuring several previously released tracks. Their sixth album, Rock Machine, was released on 11 October 2024.

== Discography ==
=== Albums ===
Album and details	Peak positions	
Album and details	FRA	BEL (Wa)
Psycho Tropical Berlin: Release date: 8 April 2013; Record label: Barclay / Born Bad Records	33	125
Mystère: Release date: 2 September 2016	9	38
Paradigmes: Release date: 2 April 2021; Record label: Disque Pointu	14	17
Teatro lúcido: Release date: 4 November 2022; Record label: Disque Pointu / Born Bad Records	32	80
Paris-Hawaï: Release date: 19 May 2023; Record label: Disque Pointu
Rock Machine: Release date: 11 October 2024; Record label: Disque Pointu

=== EPs ===
Year	Album	Peak positions
Year	Album	FRA
2010	La Femme EP	–
2011	Le podium #1 (EP)	–
2013	La Femme	153
2018	Runway (EP)	–

=== Singles ===
Year	Single	Peak positions	Album
Year	Single	FRA	Album
2013	"Sur la planche"	107	Psycho Tropical Berlin
2016	"Sphynx"	103	Mystère
2016	"Où va le monde ?"	134	Mystère
2016	"Septembre"	169	Mystère
2020	"Paradigme"	—	Paradigmes
2020	"Cool Colorado"	—	Paradigmes
2020	"Disconnexion"	—	Paradigmes
2021	"Foutre le bordel"	—	Paradigmes
2021	"Le Sang De Mon Prochain"	126	Paradigmes

Others

- 2011: "From Tchernobyl with Love"
- 2012: "La Planche"
- 2012: "Télégraphe"
- 2017: "Orgie de gobelins sous champignons"
- 2019: "L'hawaïenne"

== Musical style and influences ==
The music of La Femme evokes cold wave, rock, and the influences of groups such as the Velvet Underground, Kraftwerk, Deux, Zoulou, and surf music. The group cites Jacno and Marie et les Garçons as its two main influences.
