= Mysterion =

Mysterion may refer to:

- Mysterion (film), a 1991 documentary by Pirjo Honkasalo
- Mysterion (Last Exile), key secret riddle in the steampunk anime Last Exile
- Mysterion the Mind Reader, Canadian mentalist
- Greek term for the sacred mysteries of Christianity
- Mysterion, alter-ego of the South Park character Kenny McCormick
- Durand Mysterion, stage name of Ron Easley, guitarist with Tav Falco's Panther Burns
- Song by synthpop band Alphaville, from the 1999 box set Dreamscapes
- Song by thrash metal band The Crown, from the 1999 album Hell Is Here
- Custom car by "Big Daddy" Ed Roth
- Mysterion (comics), Marvel character first appearing in 2013

== See also ==
- Mysterians (disambiguation)
- Mysteron
- Mystery (disambiguation)
