= Mystère (album) =

Studio album by La Femme
- Released: 2 September 2016
- Genre: Psychedelic rock; psychedelic pop
- Label: Born Bad

La Femme chronology
Psycho Tropical Berlin (2013)	Mystère (2016)	Paradigmes (2021)

Singles from Mystère
- 1. "Sphynx" Released: 17 March 2016; 2. "Où Va Le Monde" Released: 3 June 2016; 3. "Septembre" Released: 26 August 2016

Professional ratings
Aggregate scores
Source	Rating
Metacritic	79/100
Review scores
Source	Rating
The Guardian	4/5 stars
The Quietus	favorable
The Line of Best Fit	8/10

Mystère is the second album from French psychedelic rock group La Femme, released on 2 September 2016 via Born Bad Records.

== Track listing ==
No.	Title	Length
1.	"Sphynx"	5:43
2.	"Le vide est ton nouveau prénom"	4:07
3.	"Où va le monde"	5:37
4.	"Septembre"	3:51
5.	"Tatiana"	2:43
6.	"Conversations nocturnes"	0:21
7.	"SSD"	4:30
8.	"Exorciseur"	2:38
9.	"Elle ne t'aime pas"	3:58
10.	"Mycose"	3:51
11.	"Tueur de fleurs"	3:43
12.	"Al Warda"	5:02
13.	"Psyzook"	3:39
14.	"Le Chemin"	4:37
15.	"Vagues"	13:02
16.	"Always in the Sun"	4:06
17.	"Couteau"	3:02
Total length:		1:14:30

== Charts ==
Chart (2016)	Peak position
Belgian Albums (Ultratop Wallonia)	38
French Albums (SNEP)	8
Swiss Albums (Schweizer Hitparde)	74
