= Spirit of Mystery =

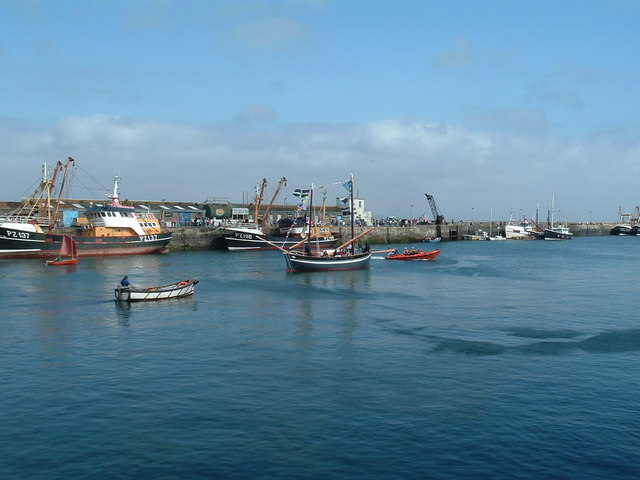
- Spirit of Mystery in Cornwall

History

United Kingdom
- Name: Spirit of Mystery
- Builder: Chris Rees
- Launched: 21 June 2008
- Identification: MMSI number: 235067605; Callsign: 2BNC4
- Status: Active
- Notes: Replica of lugger Mystery which made a one way voyage between Penzance and Melbourne in 1854 – 1855

General characteristics
- Tons burthen: 16 tons
- Length: 37 ft (11.28 m)
- Beam: 11 ft 6 in (3.51 m)
- Propulsion: Sails
- Sail plan: Lugger
- Complement: 4

Spirit of Mystery is a replica of the Mount's Bay lugger Mystery which made a voyage to Australia in 1854/55. In 1854 a discussion in the Star Inn in Newlyn led seven fishermen to set sail in the hope of finding their fortunes. 116 days later, their Cornish lugger, Mystery, a 37 ft fishing boat that had never previously been out of sight of land, arrived in Melbourne, 12,000 miles away.

== Construction ==
Spirit of Mystery was built at Millbrook by Chris Rees for Pete Goss. Construction took ten months. She is a replica of Mystery, which made a one way voyage to Australia in 1854–55. Spirit of Mystery was launched on 21 June 2008. Incorporated into Spirit of Mystery is wood from Cutty Sark, and HMS Victory, with some of the rigging coming from SS Great Britain.

Construction of Spirit of Mystery closely followed the design of the original luggers. The only concessions to modernity are watertight bulkheads and heavier ballast. Electrics have been fitted as it is a legal requirement to have navigation lights. An engine has been fitted but will not be used on the journey to Australia. Internally, oil lamps will be used, and navigation will be by the sun and stars, although a satellite tracking device allows the progress of Spirit of Mystery to be followed on the internet. As on the original Mystery, a coke stove is installed. However, the diet and clothing of the crew are to modern standards, and there is a toilet and gas cooker on board.

== History ==
=== Voyage to Australia ===
Spirit of Mystery left Newlyn at 18:00 on 20 October 2008, bound for Cape Town, just as Mystery did in 1854. Pete Goss is reported to have been in such a hurry to leave that he left his socks and pants in a tumble dryer at a launderette. Spirit of Mystery crossed the Equator on 21 November 2008. The crew is Andy Goss, Eliot Goss, Pete Goss and Andy Maidment. Spirit of Mystery arrived in Cape Town on 25 December 2008 Spirit of Mystery left Cape Town on 13 January 2009, with an estimated arrival time in Australia of the first week in March.

At 09:30 hrs local time on 4 March 2009, Spirit of Mystery was hit by a wave which rolled her more than 90 degrees on her side. Although she righted herself, Mark Maidment sustained a broken leg in the incident. The boat's liferaft and dinghy were lost overboard in the incident. Spirit of Mystery was off Kangaroo Island and some 300 nautical miles (560 km) off the coast of Australia when the incident happened. Spirit of Mystery sailed towards Australia in order that Mark Maidment could be airlifted off by helicopter. He was originally scheduled to be rescued during the morning of 6 March 2009. Spirit of Mystery eventually put into Portland where Mark Maidment was transferred to an ambulance for transport to a hospital in Melbourne where he underwent an operation. The boat was damaged in the incident, and was reduced to a speed of 4 knots (7 km/h).

Spirit of Mystery arrived in Melbourne on 9 March 2009. The crew were greeted with a pint and a pasty.
