= JS Unryū =

Sōryū-class submarine

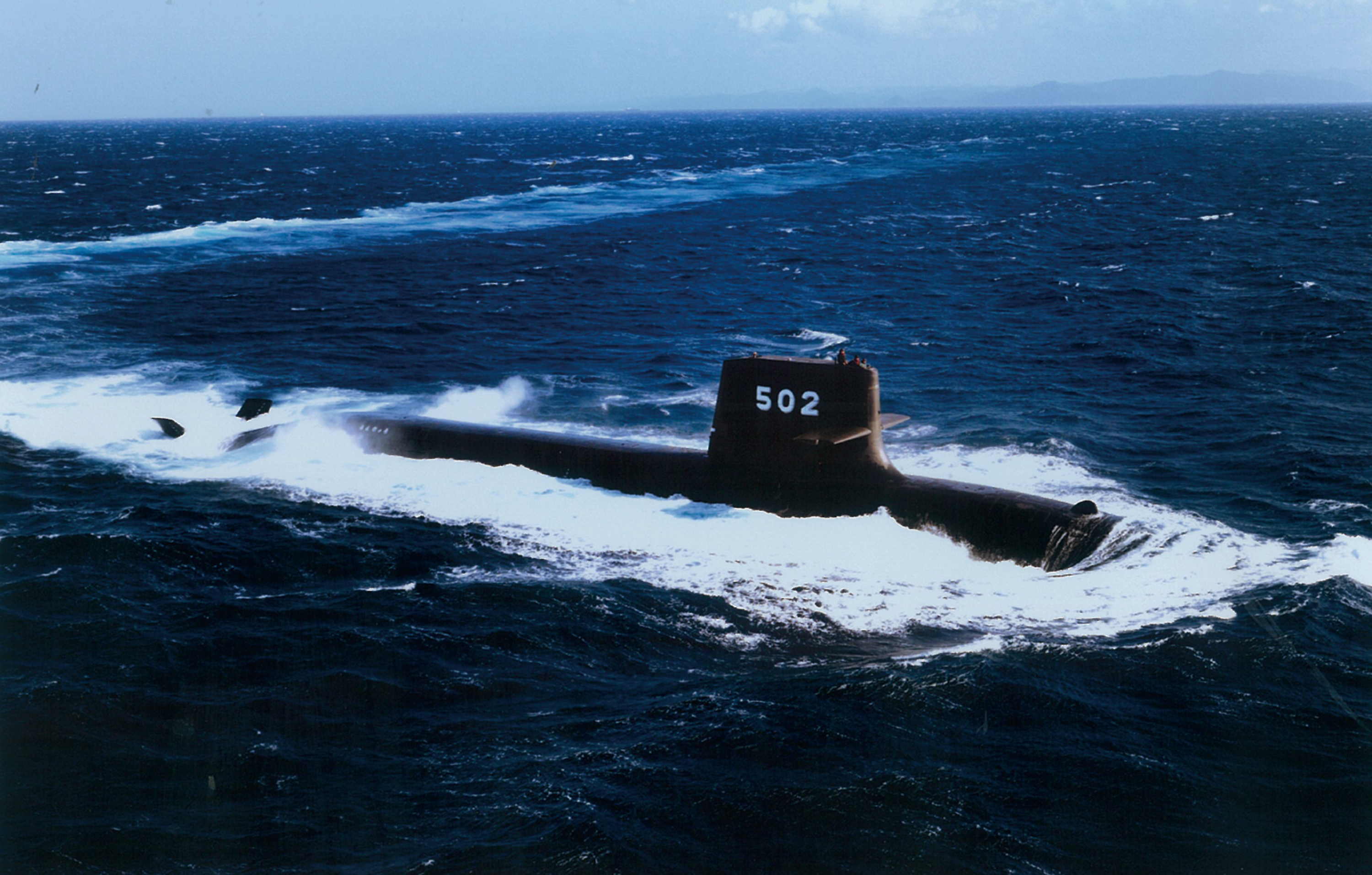
- JS Unryū

History

Japan
- Name: Unryū; (うんりゅう)
- Namesake: Flying dragon in cloud
- Ordered: 2005
- Builder: Kawasaki Heavy Industries
- Cost: ¥64.3 billion
- Laid down: 31 March 2006
- Launched: 15 October 2008
- Commissioned: 25 March 2010
- Home port: Kure
- Identification: SS-502
- Status: Active

General characteristics
- Class & type: Sōryū-class attack submarine
- Displacement: Surfaced: 2,900 tonnes (2,854 long tons); Submerged: 4,200 t (4,134 long tons)
- Length: 84.0 m (275 ft 7 in)
- Beam: 9.1 m (29 ft 10 in)
- Draught: 8.5 m (27 ft 11 in)
- Propulsion: 1-shaft 2× Kawasaki 12V 25/25 SB-type diesel engines diesel-electric; 4× Kawasaki Kockums V4-275R Stirling engines; 3,900 hp (2,900 kW) surfaced; 8,000 hp (6,000 kW) submerged
- Speed: Surfaced: 13 kn (24 km/h; 15 mph); Submerged: 20 kn (37 km/h; 23 mph)
- Range: AIP endurance (est.): 6,100 nautical miles (11,300 km; 7,000 mi) at 6.5 knots (12.0 km/h; 7.5 mph)
- Complement: 65 (9 officers, 56 enlisted)
- Sensors & processing systems: ZPS-6F surface/low-level air search radar; Hughes/Oki ZQQ-7 Sonar suite: 1× bow-array, 4× LF flank arrays and 1× Towed array sonar
- Electronic warfare & decoys: ZLR-3-6 ESM equipment; 2× 3-inch underwater countermeasure launcher tubes for launching of Acoustic Device Countermeasures (ADCs)
- Armament: 6 × HU-606 21 in (533 mm) torpedo tubes with 30 reloads for: 1.) Type 89 torpedo; 2.) Harpoon (missile); Mines

JS Unryū (SS-502) is the second boat of the Sōryū-class submarines of the Japan Maritime Self-Defense Force. She was commissioned on 25 March 2010.

== Construction and career ==
Unryū was laid down at Kawasaki Heavy Industries Kobe Shipyard on 31 March 2006 as the 2005 plan 2900-ton submarine No. 8117 based on the medium-term defense capability development plan. At the launching ceremony, it was named Unryū and launched. She was commissioned on 25 March 2010 and deployed to Kure.

On 24 September 2013, she left Kure for Hawaii for training in the United States. She returned to Kure on 24 December.

From 10 to 15 May 2016, joint training such as anti-submarine training was conducted with the Royal Australian Navy submarine HMAS Rankin off the coast of Shikoku.

From 14 October 2016 to 14 January 2017, he participated in the US dispatch training (toward Hawaii).

From 27 August to 28 November 2020, the ship participated in US dispatch training (submarines) and conducted offshore training and facility utilization training in the Hawaiian Islands area.

Unryū belongs to the 5th Submarine of the 1st Submarine Group, and its homeport is Kure.

== Gallery ==
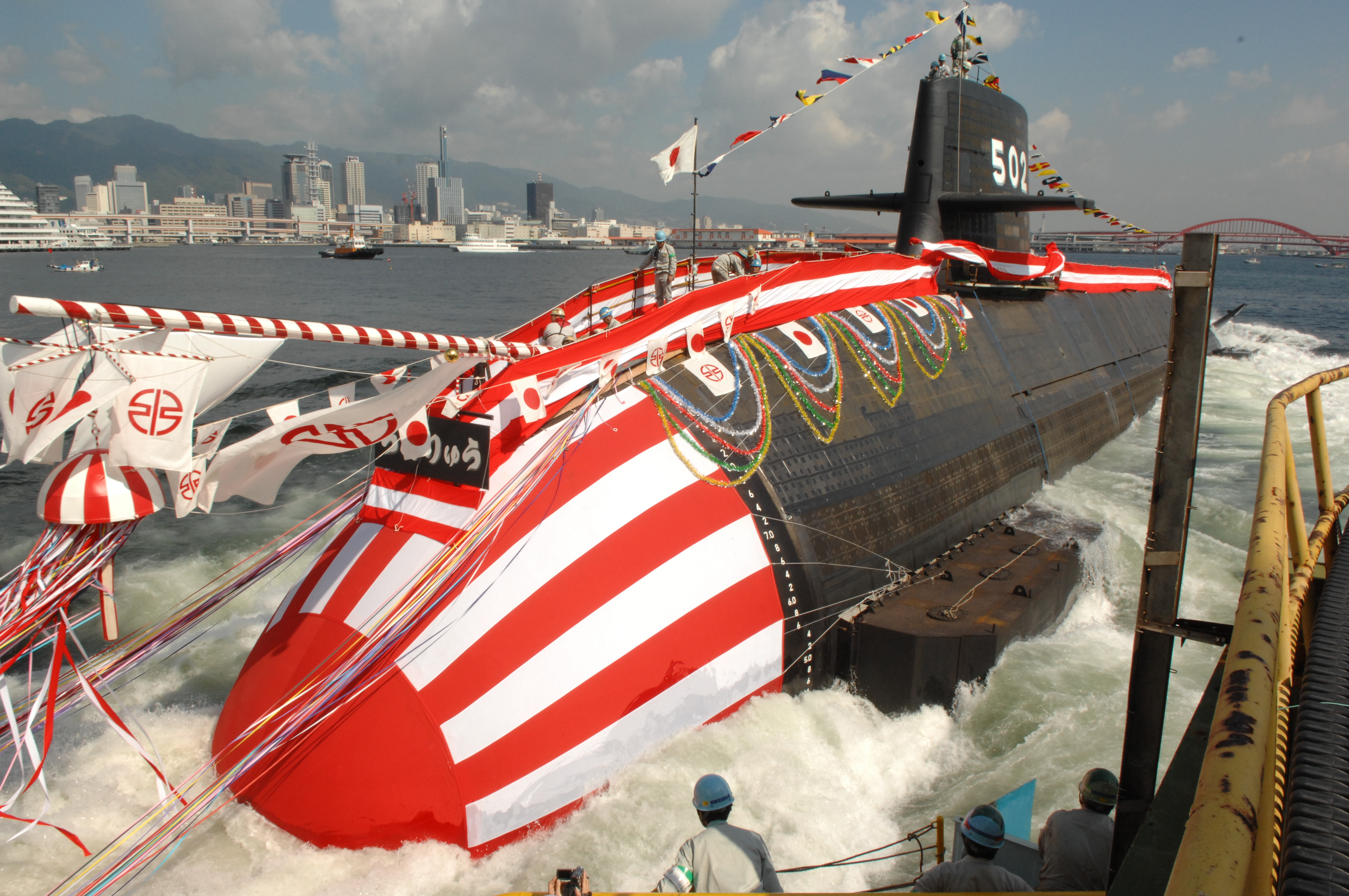
JS Unryū being launched at Kobe on 15 October 2008.

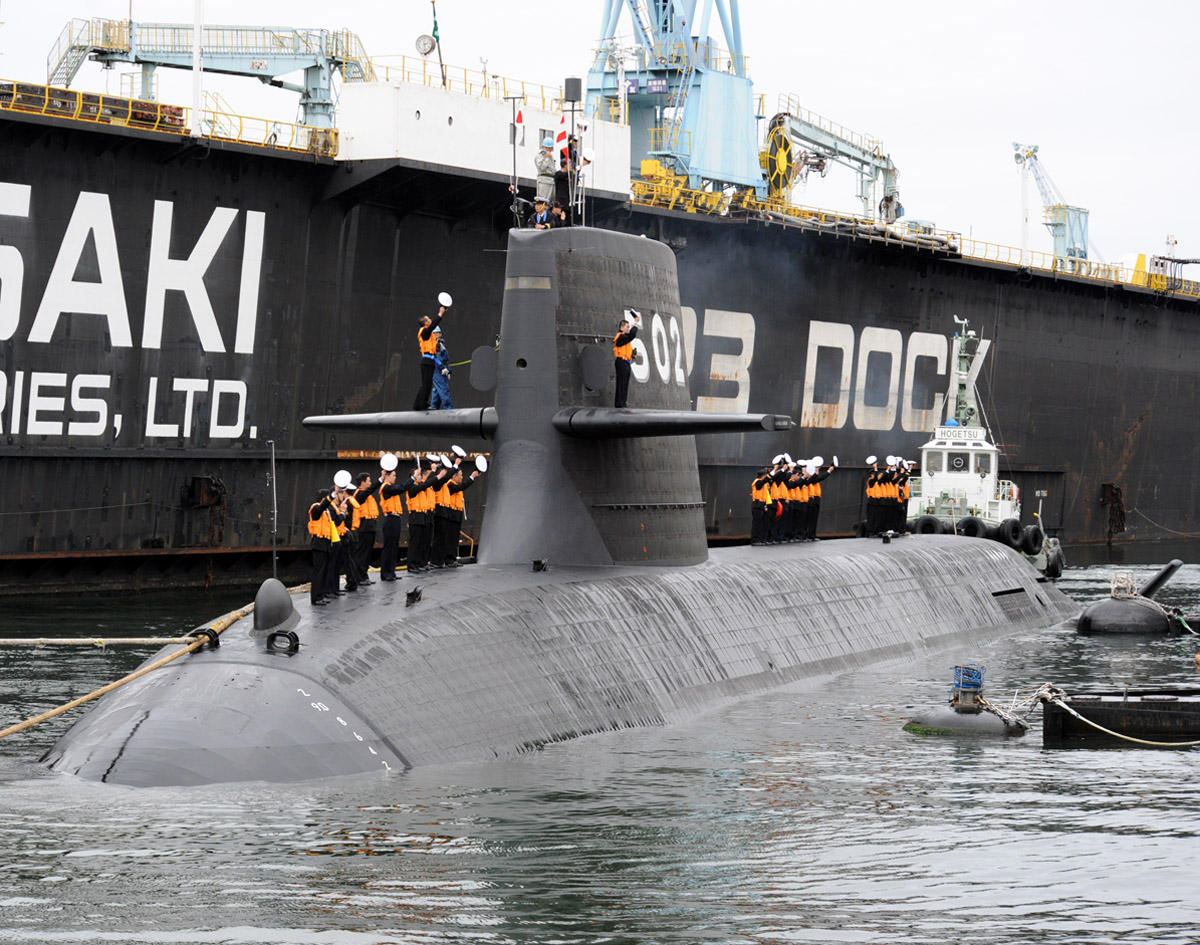
JS Unryū, date unknown

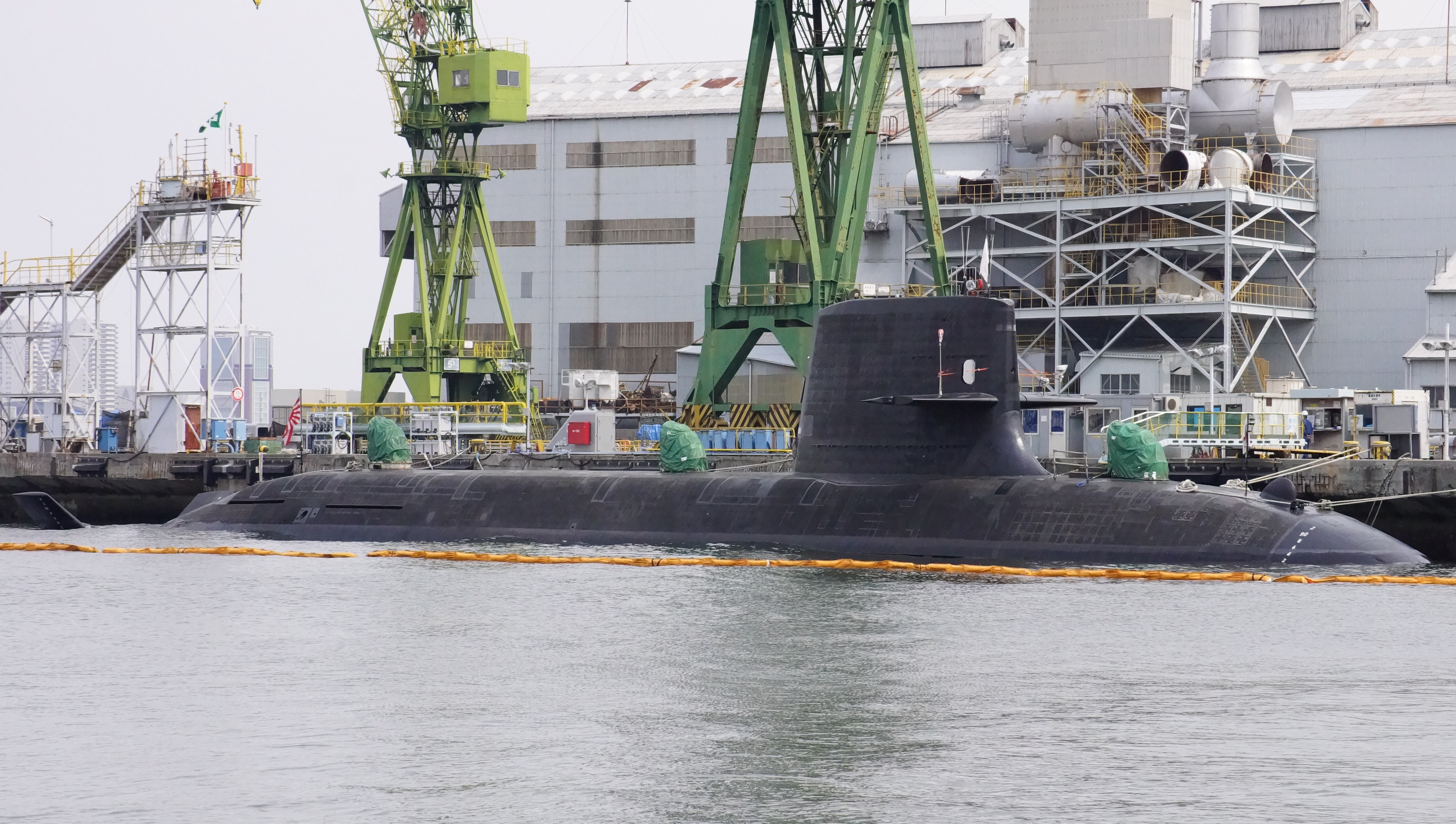
JS Unryū at Kobe on 14 April 2013.

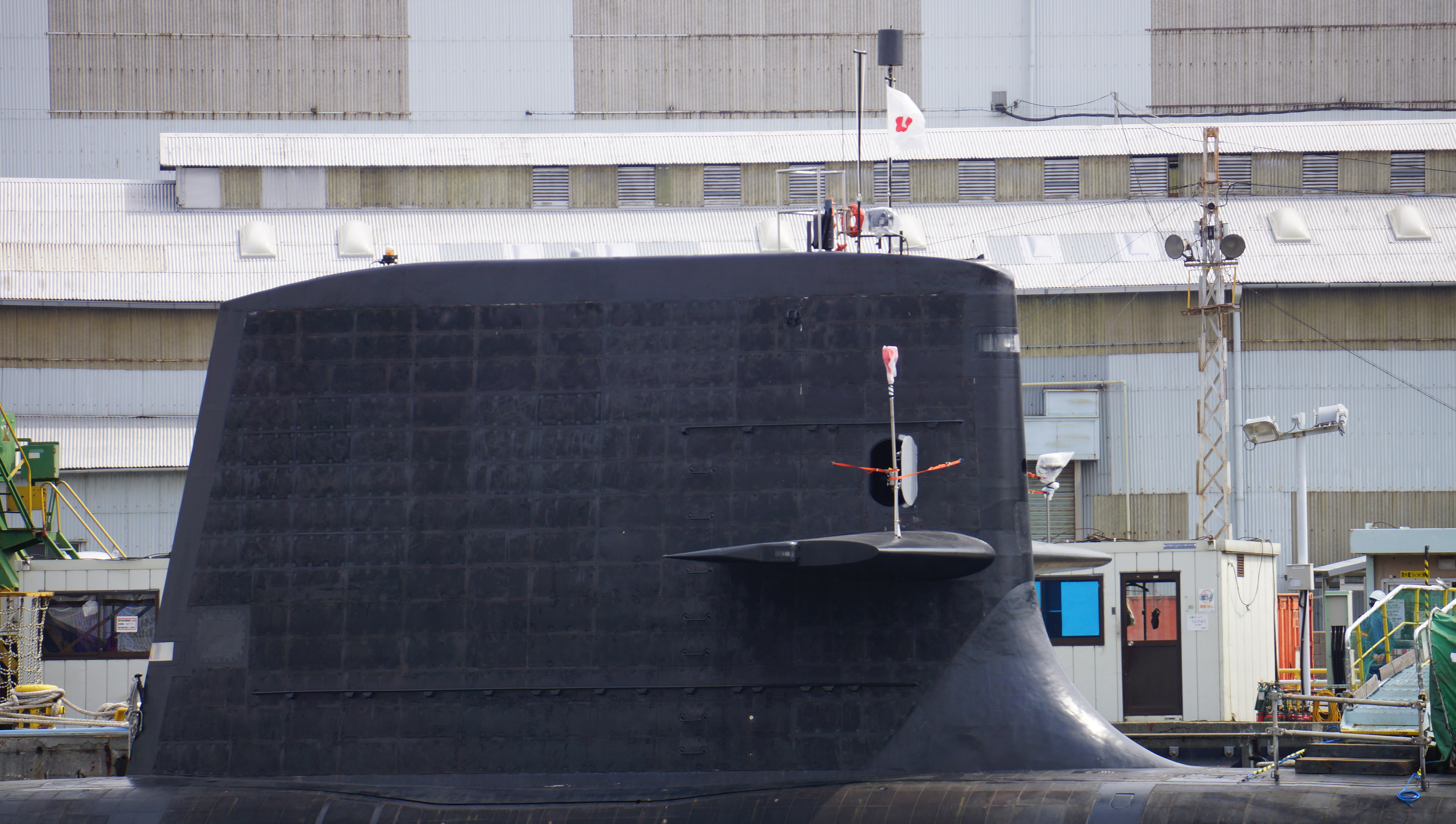
JS Unryū at Kobe on 14 April 2013.

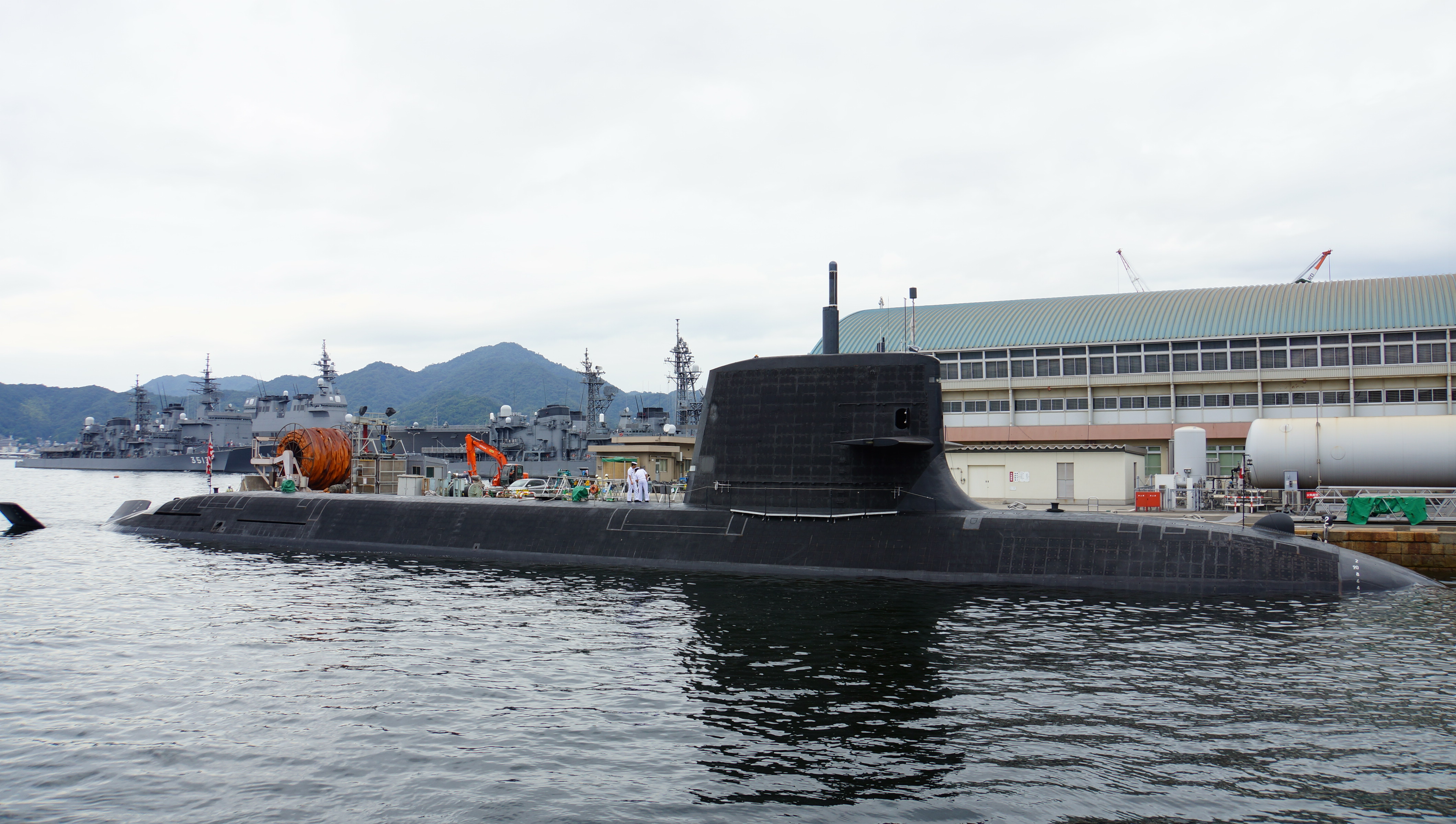
JS Unryū at Kure on 15 September 2014.

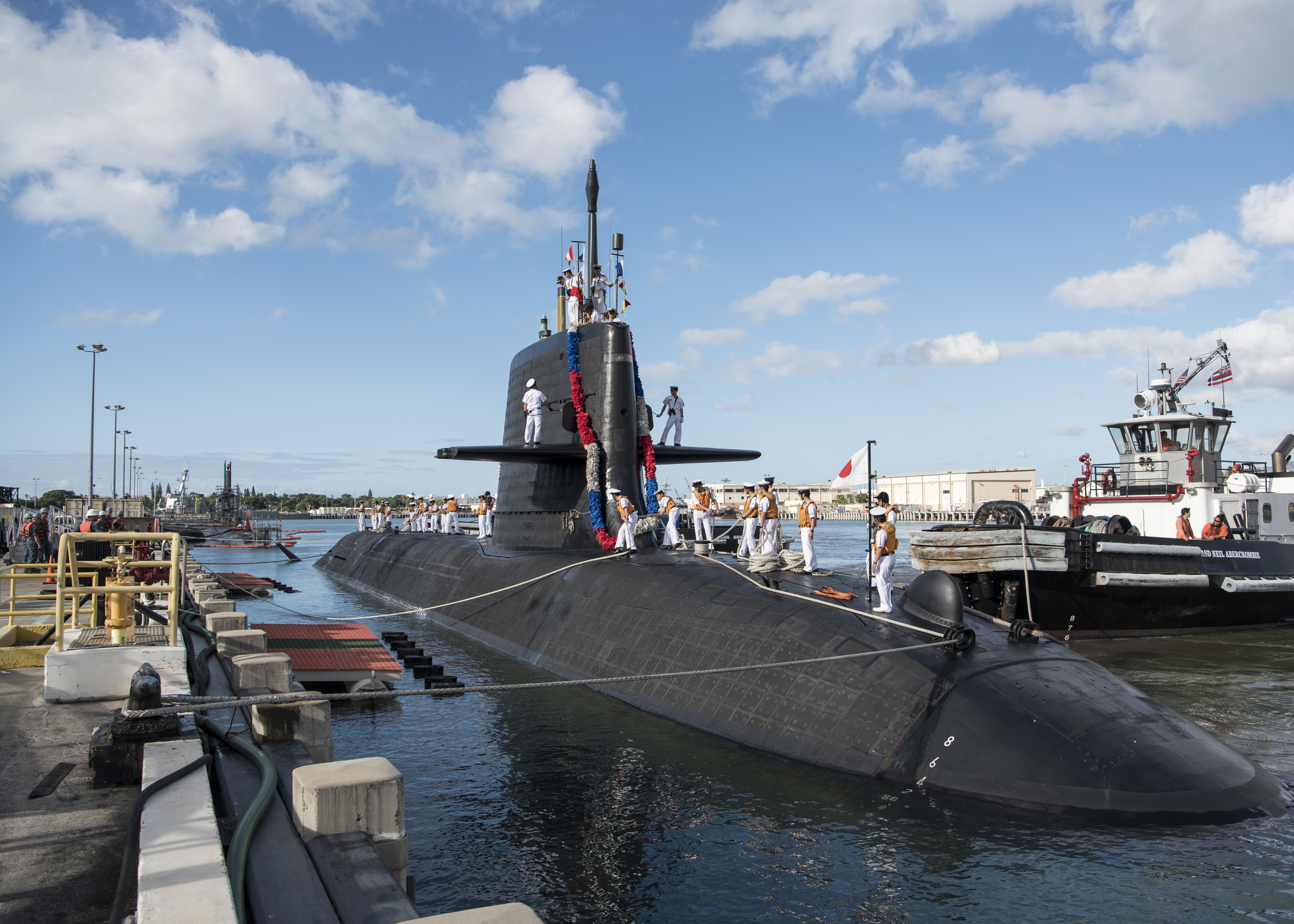
JS Unryū at Pearl Harbor on 4 November 2016.
