= Mystery (lugger) =

History

United Kingdom, New South Wales
- Name: Mystery
- Port of registry: (United Kingdom) Newyln ( -1855); (New South Wales) Melbourne (1855-69)
- Identification: PE 233
- Fate: Wrecked 26 March 1869
- Notes: Made voyage between Cornwall and Melbourne 1854 - 1855

General characteristics
- Tons burthen: 16 tons
- Length: 37 ft (11.28 m)
- Beam: 11 ft 6 in (3.51 m)
- Propulsion: Sails
- Sail plan: Lugger
- Complement: 7

Mystery was a Mount's Bay lugger which made a voyage to Australia in 1854/55. Her passage to Cape Town was so fast that she was commissioned to take mail from there to Australia.

== History ==
Mystery was a Mount's Bay lugger used for fishing inshore waters. In 1854, seven Cornishmen (Richard Nicholls, Job Kelynack, Richard Badcock, William Badcock, Lewis Lewis, Charles Boase & PC Mathews) decided to try their luck in finding gold in Australia. As they were all shareholders in the boat, it was suggested that Mystery be sold to cover their passage to Australia, but the captain, Richard Nicholls said that he would take them to Australia in Mystery.

The boat was prepared for the long sea voyage by covering the hull in zinc, and adding decking fore and aft. They left Newlyn or Penzance (sources vary) on 18 November 1854, passing Madeira on 25 November and San Antonio on 3 December. After this, Mystery encountered some bad weather, and her jib split. The Equator was crossed on 15 December. Trinidad was passed on 23 December and on 26 December communication was made with the brig Callao, which was bound for Liverpool. A letter was entrusted to her captain giving details of their journey so far. The Cape of Good Hope was sighted on 17 January, and Cape Town was reached the next day, after a journey of 60 days. The Harbour Master thought that Mystery was a local boat and did not board her until the crew beached the boat with ease.

Five days were spent at Cape Town repairing Mystery and replenishing supplies. They had made such good time to Cape Town that the Royal Mail commissioned them to take post on to Australia. For the first few days out of Cape Town the weather was bad, but Mystery was unscathed. Further gales were encountered on 18 and 23 February and 3 March. Cape Northumberland was sighted on 9 March and Mystery reached Melbourne on 14 March 1855 after a journey of 11,800 nautical miles (21,900 km). Mystery remained in Australia, where she was used as a pilot cutter. On 26 March 1869, she was wrecked in Keppel Bay, Rockhampton, Queensland. All crew were saved.

== Crew ==
The crew who made the voyage were Richard Badcock, William Badcock, Charles Boase, Job Kelynack, Lewis Lewis, Philip Curnow Matthews and Richard Nicholls (captain). Two of the crew, Lewis and Matthews settled in Australia. The other five returned home.

== Replica ==
In 2008, yachtsman Pete Goss commissioned Cornish boat designer and builder Chris Rees to build a replica of the Mystery with the intention of recreating the journey. The replica is named Spirit of Mystery. The Spirit of Mystery sailed from Newlyn on 20 October 2008. She arrived in Cape Town on 25 December 2008. Spirit of Mystery arrived in Melbourne on 9 March 2009.
