= Vieilles Charrues Festival =

Annual festival in Carhaix, Brittany, France

Coordinates: 48°16′15″N 3°33′30″W

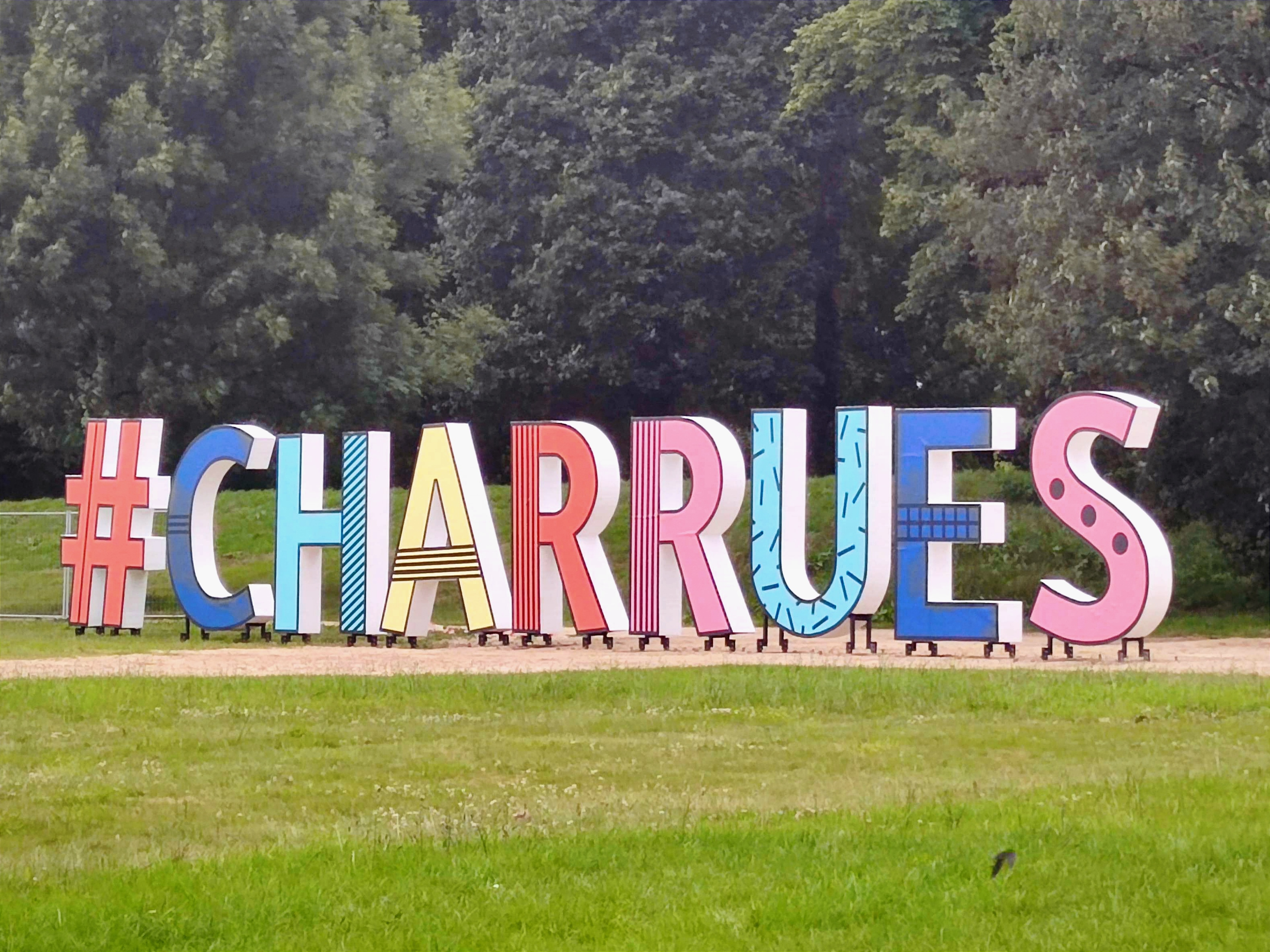
Giant letters before the beginning of the Vieilles Charrues Festival 2022.

The Vieilles Charrues Festival (French: Festival des Vieilles Charrues, pronounced [fɛstival de vjɛj ʃaʁy]; Breton: Gouel an Erer Kozh, pronounced [ˈɡweːl ãn ˈeˑrɛr ˈkoːs]; literally: Old Ploughs Festival) is held every year in mid-July in the city of Carhaix, France.

== History ==
=== 1990s ===
The first edition takes place in 1992. In 1994, 3,000 festival-goers attended the concerts.

=== 2000s ===
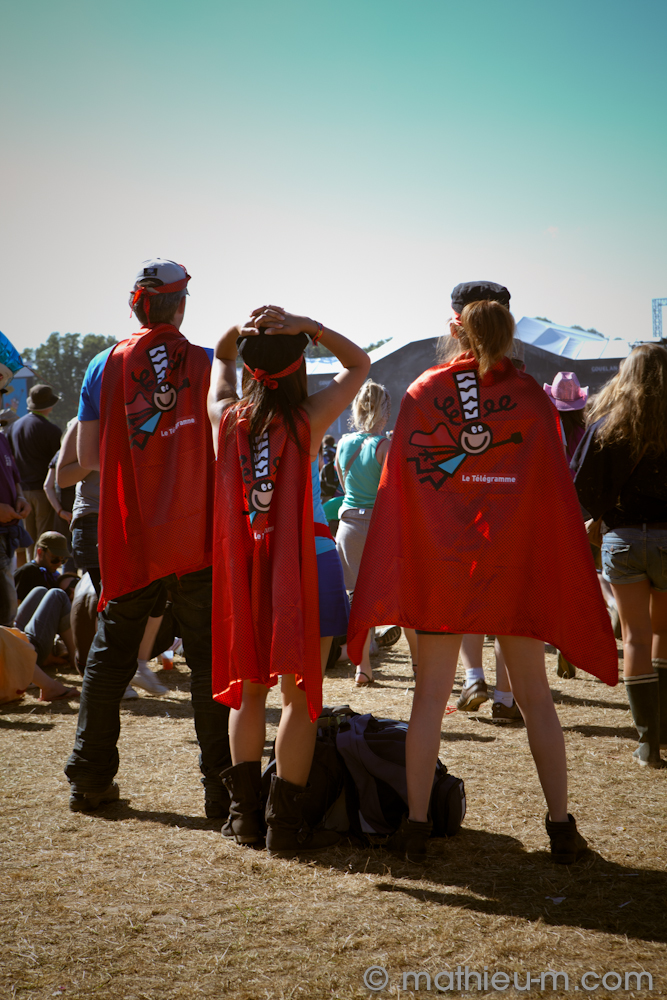
Festival-goers as Superheroes in 2012

In 2001, the festival welcomes a new president, Paul Hély, Christian Troadec having been elected mayor of Carhaix. The festival welcomes 200,000 people over three days.

In 2002, the festival attracts 160,000 festival-goers.

In 2003, the festival is threatened by the conflict over the reform of the status of the show’s workers.

In 2009, Bruce Springsteen welcomes festival-goers in a local language, not French but Breton. Springsteen says: "Demat Karaez ! Demat Karaez !" (Hello Carhaix!). He adds: "Mat an traoù ganeoc'h" (How are you?) then "Tri Martolod" (Three sailors), a traditional Breton song.

=== 2010s ===
In 2012, the theme of the festival is Superheroes.

=== 2020s ===
In 2023, the festival attracts 346,000 festival-goers.

== Frequentation ==
The festival welcomes 10,000 festivalgoers in 1995, 40,000 in 1997, 100,000 in 1998, 200,000 in 2001, 268,000 festivalgoers for the 20 years in 2011.

Vieilles Charrues Festival 2016 - Panoramic view on stage

In 2023, the participation record reached 346,000. But 2024 has a deficit of €1M with 250,000 festival-goers. In 2025, financial balance is restored with 264,000 festival-goers. The daily rate remains at €52.

== Organisation ==
The festival promotes the Breton language. Part of the association’s work is devoted to the development of the associative and cultural fabric of Central Brittany, in a process of development of the Breton language. In 1999, the festival promoted financially the Breton-medium Diwan school network.

The festival has an impact on the city of Carhaix-Plouguer: its culture center with a capacity of 3,000 people is bigger than the Olympia Hall in Paris. The organisation of Vieilles Charrues festival needs 2,500 employees and 7,400 volunteers.

== Lineups ==
=== 2025 ===
- Thursday, July 17: Alanis Morissette, Astéréotypie, Craze, Damiano David, Deluxe, GaBLé, Grife, Malik Djoudi, Meat Shirt, Naza, Nina Kraviz, Saïan Supa Celebration, Théodort, Vladimir Cauchemar
- Friday, July 18: Aime Simone, Alo Wala, Ana Lua Caiano, David Krakauer, Eléonore Fourniau, Gesaffelstein, Horizontal Francis, Julien Doré, L'Entourloop, Macklemore, Maraboutage, Pamela, Quinquis, Solann, Tif
- Saturday, July 19: Adèle Castillon, Aïta mon amour, Amelie Lens, Aurora, Barokistania, Fallen Alien, Feràmia, Fleuves, Ital express, Lambrini Girls, Lorho-Pasco/Lintanf, Luidji, Martin Solveig, Nicol/le Forestier, Philippe Katerine, Roszalie, Stereophonics, The Kraken Consort, Théodora, Totorro, Worakls Orchestra
- Sunday, July 20: Ben Mazué, Boogie, Damso, Kompromat, La Mòssa, Last Train, Mémé k7 kba#10, Miki, Mitsune, Ofenbach, Perceval, Ronisia, Sami Galbi, Sex Pistols ft. Frank Carter, Théa, Wallace Cleaver, Yoa, Zaho de Sagazan

=== 2024 ===
- Thursday, July 11: Alias, Apashe with brass orchestra, Baby Volcano, David Guetta, Gossip, Hervé, L'Impératrice, Lucie Antunes, Marc Cerrone, Meute, PLK, Sam Smith, Shay, Yamê, Zamdane, Zaoui
- Friday, July 12: Bab l'Bluz, Championne, Flavia Coelho, Hoshi, InC 20 Sonneurs, Jok'Air, Kid Francescoli, Labelle, Molécule, Our Lights, PJ Harvey, Roland Cristal, Santa, Simony, Sting, Trinix, Yungblud
- Saturday, July 13: Atoem, C'hoarezed Guélou, Caravan Palace, Charlotte de Witte, Creeds live, Dadju & Tayc, Dakh Daughters, Dixit, Grand Corps Malade, Ivarh, L'Haridon-Le Pottier, La Fève, Lagon Noir, Lala &ce, Les Vulves Assassines, Ojos, Olivia Ruiz, Rival Sons, Sierra, Skolvan, Soolking
- Sunday, July 14: Angélique Kidjo, Baxter Dury, Bon Entendeur, Charlotte Cardin, Chinese Man, Cxk, Djadja & Dinaz, Doria, Eddy de Pretto, Éloi, Julien Granel, Kings of Leon, Komodrag & the Mounodor, La Tène, Liraz, Maar, Simple Minds, The Blaze

=== 2023 ===
- Thursday, July 13: Céline Dion (canceled), Robbie Williams, BigFlo & Oli, Disiz, Hyphen Hyphen, Morcheeba, Petit Biscuit, Orange Blossom
- Friday, July 14: Blur, Aya Nakamura, Gazo, Jeanne Added, Shaka Ponk, Ko Ko Mo, Agar Agar, Agoria, The Celtic Social Club, Meryl
- Saturday, July 15: Rosalía, Lomepal, Idles, Kungs, Pomme, Suzane
- Sunday, July 16: Soprano, Phoenix, Hot Chip, Jain, Lorenzo, Moderat, Paul Kalkbrenner, Adé, Acid Arab, Mademoiselle K
- Monday, July 17: Red Hot Chili Peppers, Skip the Use, Nova Twins, Silmarils, The Inspector Cluzo

=== 2022 ===
- Thursday, July 14: Stromae, Clara Luciani, Last Train, Têtes Raides, Meute, Sch, Bianca Costa, Laeti, Vendredi sur mer
- Friday, July 15: DJ Snake, Angèle, Juliette Armanet, Matmatah (guest: Kevrenn Alré), Rilès, Vladimir Cauchemar, Aloïse Sauvage, Catastrophe, Dirtyphonics Live, Fatoumata Diawara, I Stand High Patrol,
- Saturday, July 16: -M-, Midnight Oil (substitute Queens of the Stone Age), Bob Sinclar b2b Pedro Winter, Izïa, Ninho, Vitalic, Celeste, Dewaere, Lous and the Yakusa
- Sunday, July 17: Orelsan, Madeon, Feu! Chatterton, Ibeyi, Metronomy, Polo & Pan, Vianney, Dinos, Contrefaçon, Gargäntua, Lolo Zouaï, Lujipeka, La Perla

=== 2021 ===
In July 2021, the 29th edition was limited to 5,000 attendees per day. For the first time, the fairground Ferris wheel was replaced with a single stage in front of seating. The main Glemnor and Kerouac stages were designated parking areas for vehicles, with no camping permitted. The festival lasted ten nights and featured Woodkid among other French singers.

=== 2020 ===
It was announced on 13 April 2020 that the 2020 edition would be cancelled due to the COVID-19 pandemic, even if Emmanuel Macron, the President of France, announced on 13 April that only festivals before mid-July had to be cancelled. Celine Dion was to sing on July 16 as part of her Courage World Tour for her only festival date in France (the 55,000 seats had been purchased in less than nine minutes).

=== 2018 ===
- Thursday, July 19: Depeche Mode, Soulwax, Marquis de Sade, Olli and the Bollywood Orchestra
- Friday, July 20: Kygo, IAM, Liam Gallagher, Jain, Mogwai, Cœur de pirate, Portugal. The Man, Rilès, Hungry 5 feat. Worakls, N'To & Joachim Pastor, Lomepal, Therapie Taxi, Throes + The Shine, Kokoko!, Lysistrata, Altın Gün, Delgrès, La Tène, Revolutionary Birds
- Saturday, July 21: Gorillaz, Massive Attack, MØ, Damso, Ofenbach, Rone, Les Négresses Vertes, Yuksek, Charlotte Cardin, Young Fathers, Lee Fields & The Expressions, Rebeka Warrior, Saro, Artus, 'Ndiaz, Maria Simoglou
- Sunday, July 22: Robert Plant & the Sensational Space Shifters, Fatboy Slim, Orelsan, Bigflo & Oli, Roméo Elvis, Véronique Sanson, Lorenzo, Oscar and the Wolf, Angèle, Eddy de Pretto, The Blaze, The Limiñanas, Inüit, Ÿuma, Ifriqiyya Électrique, Rizan Said Dour/Le Pottier Quartet
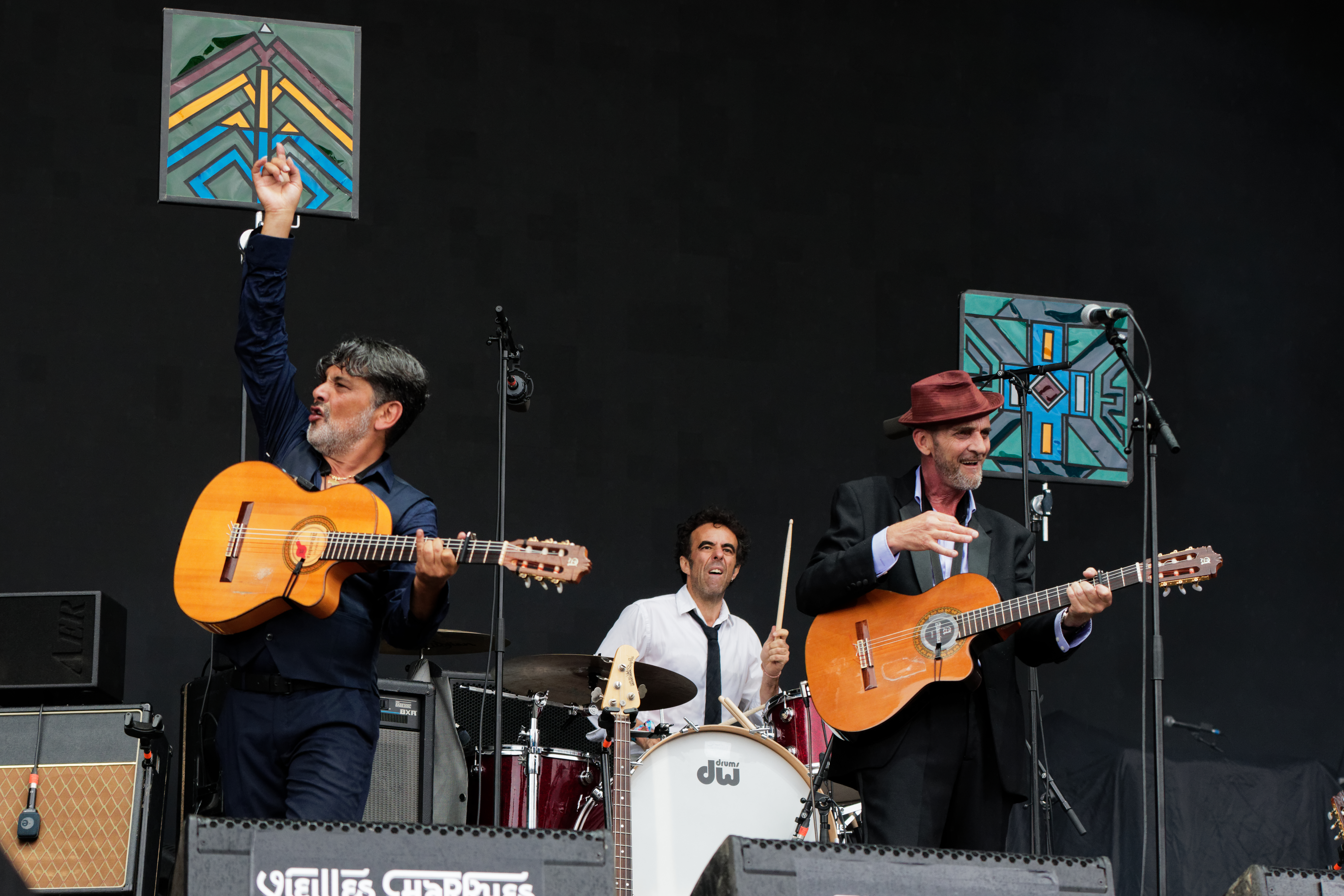
Les Négresses Vertes

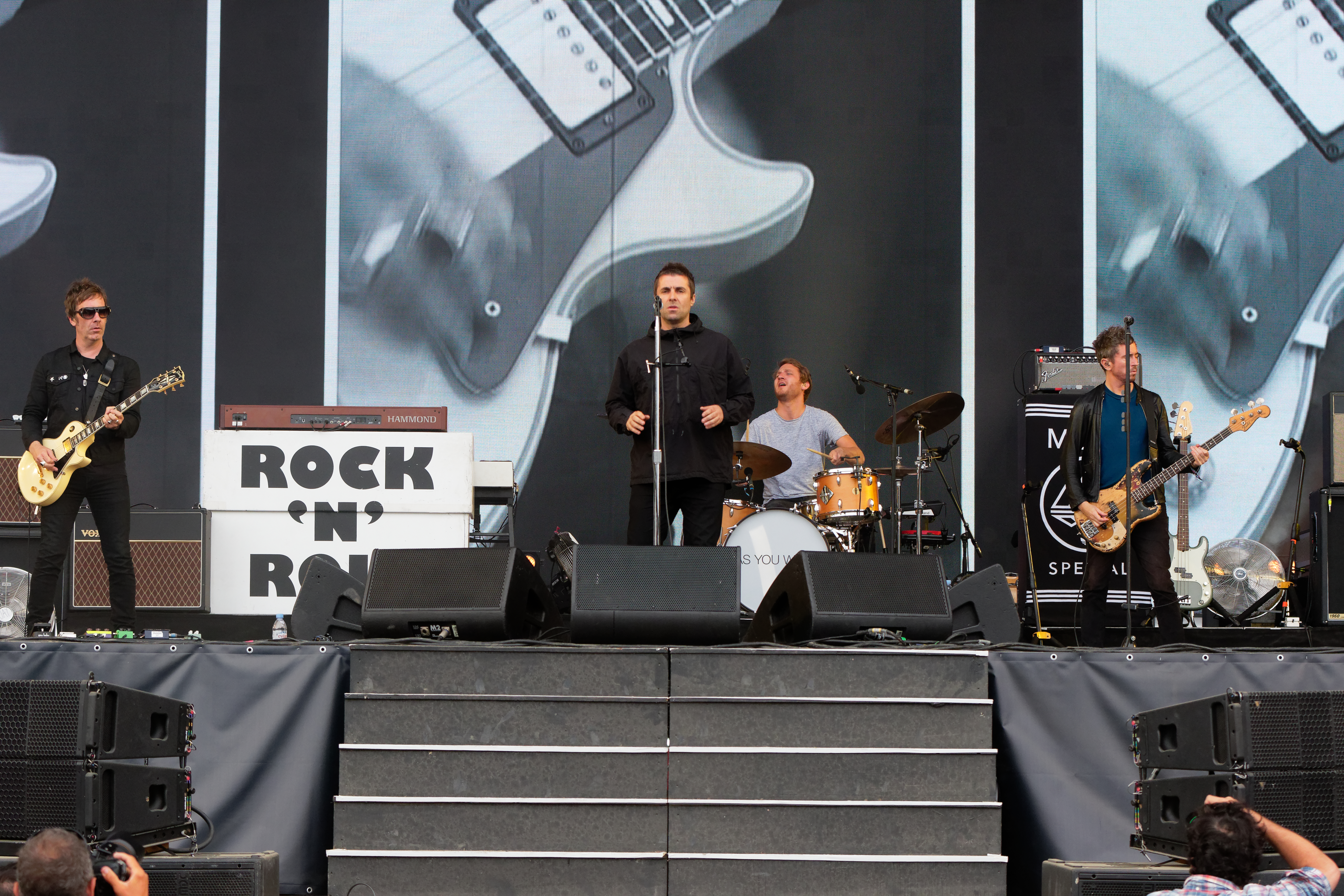
Liam Gallagher

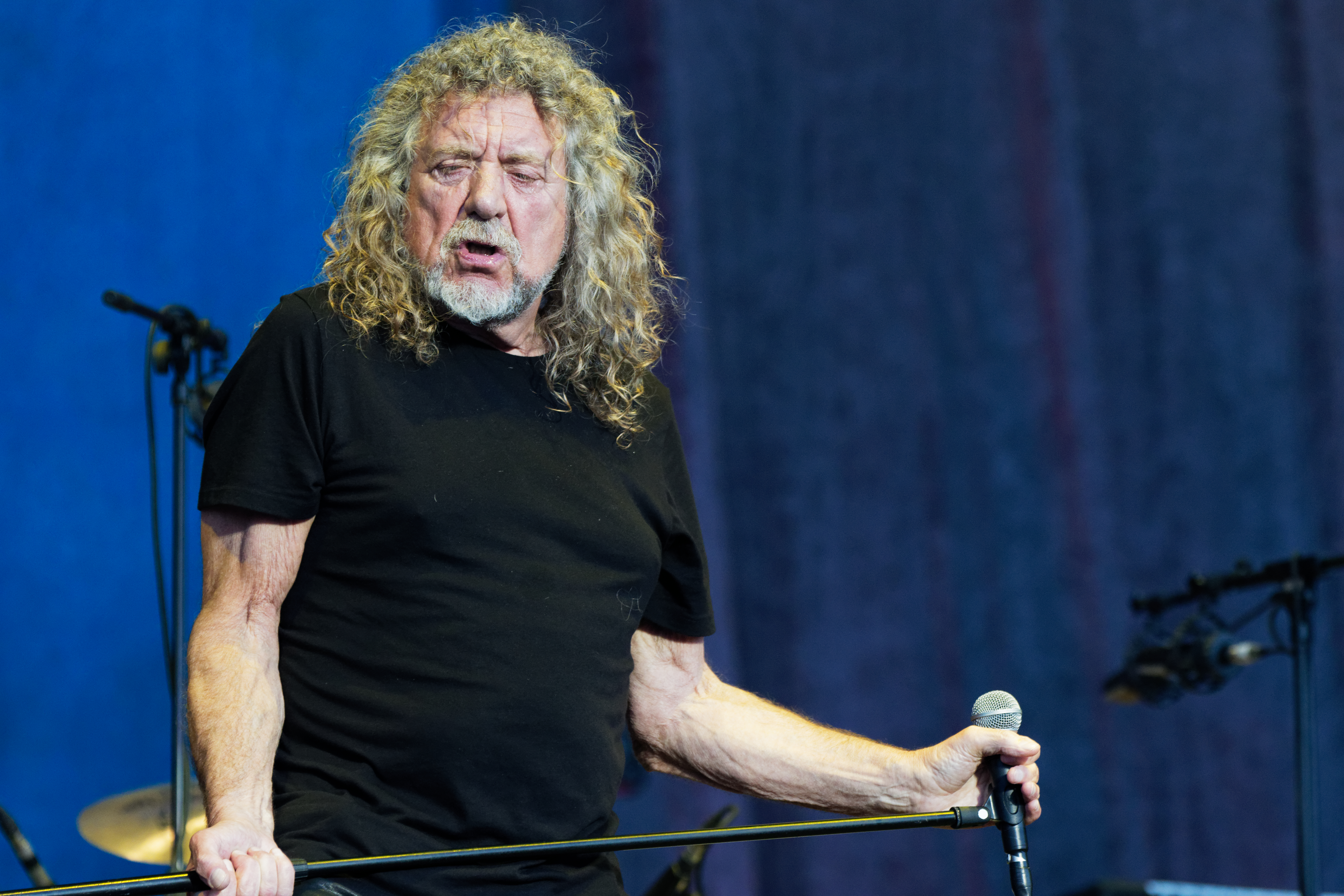
Robert Plant

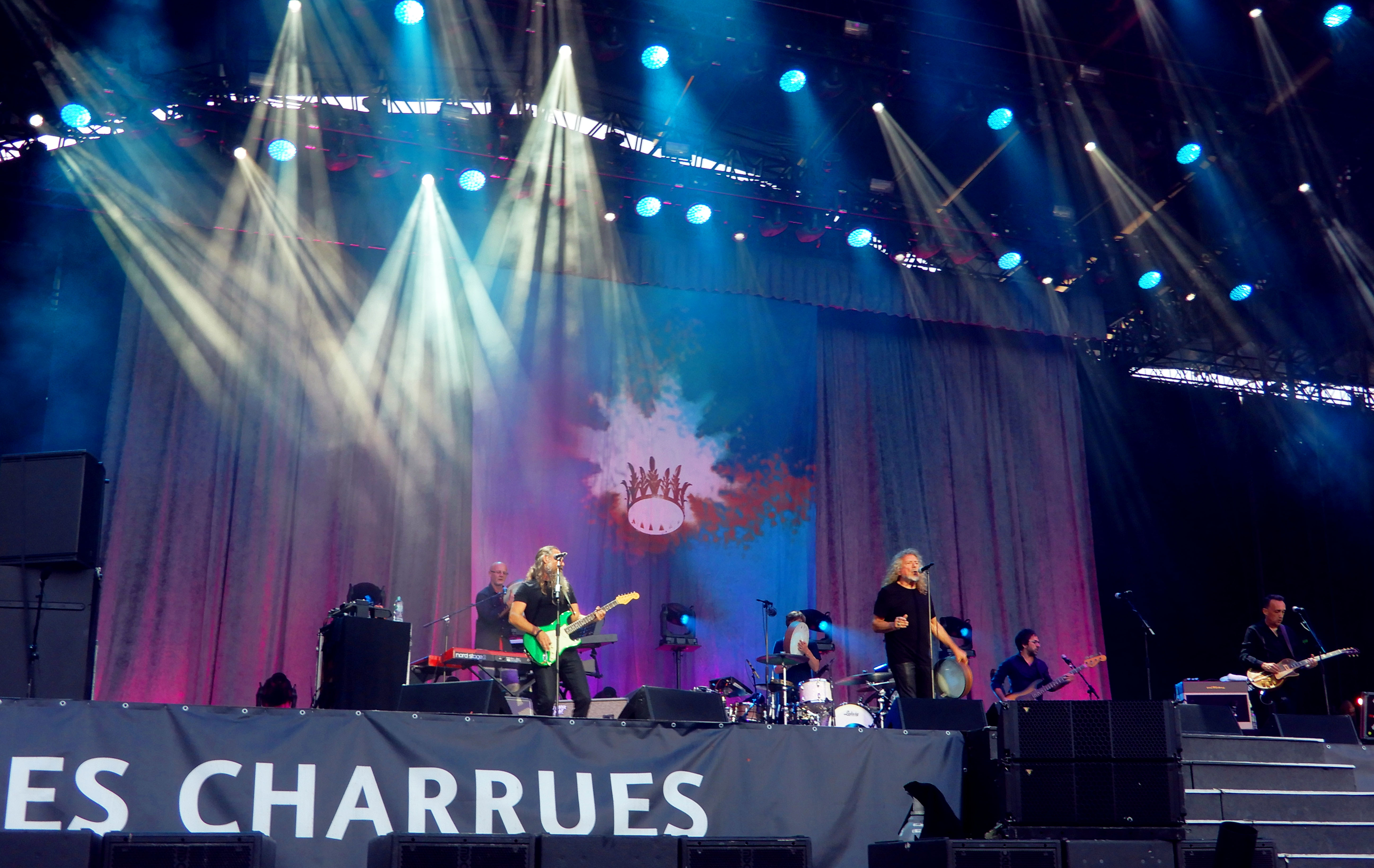

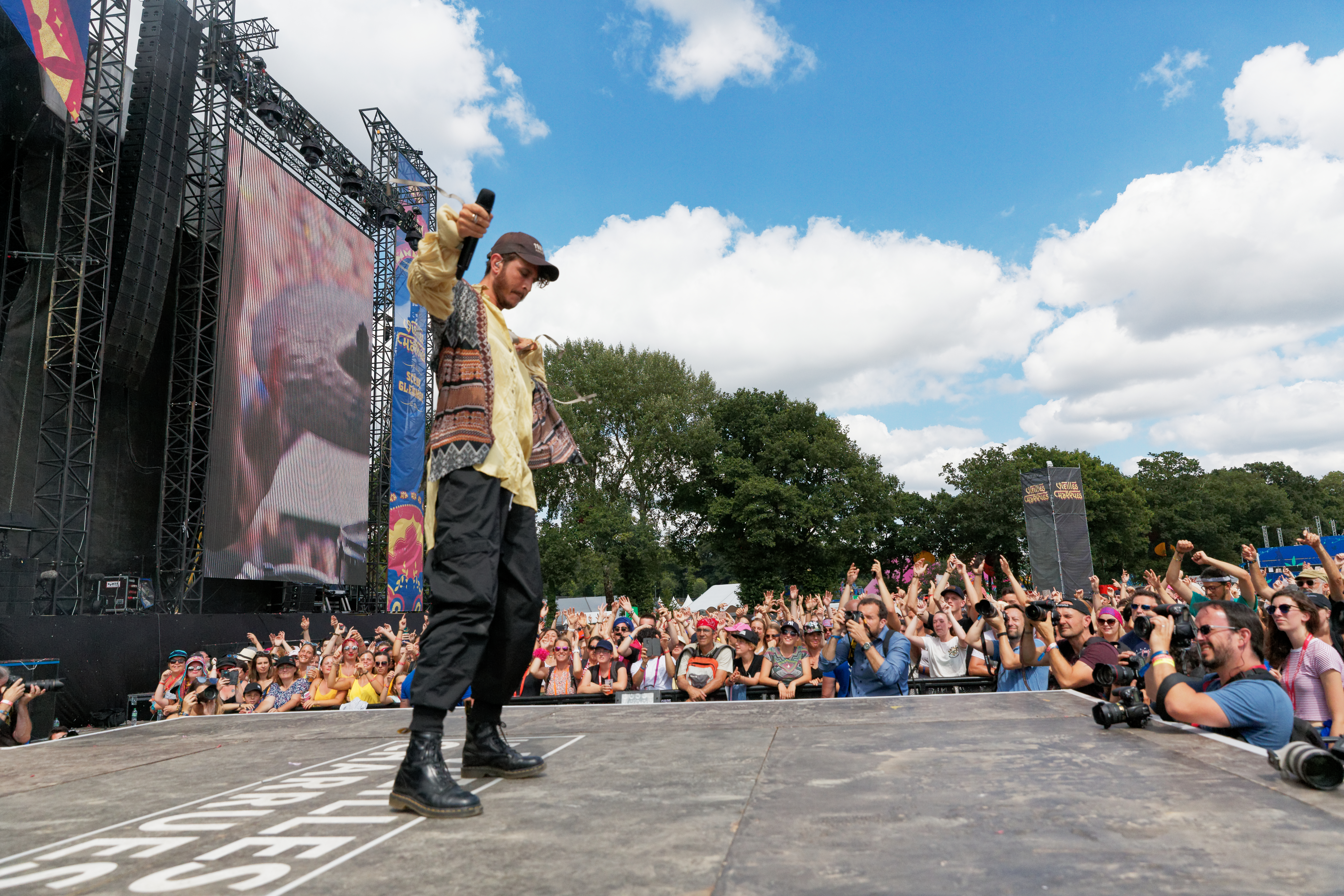
Oscar and the Wolf

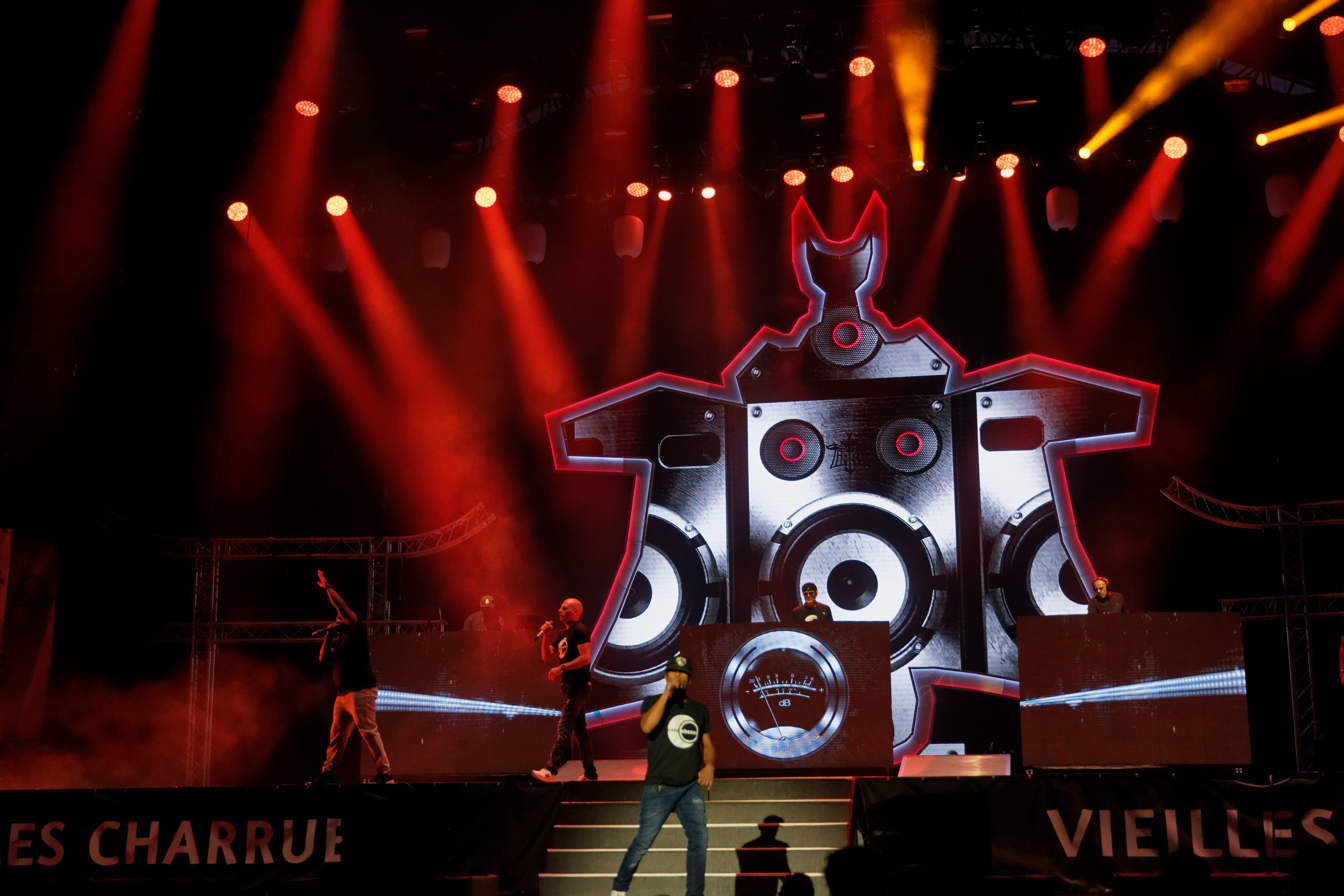
IAM

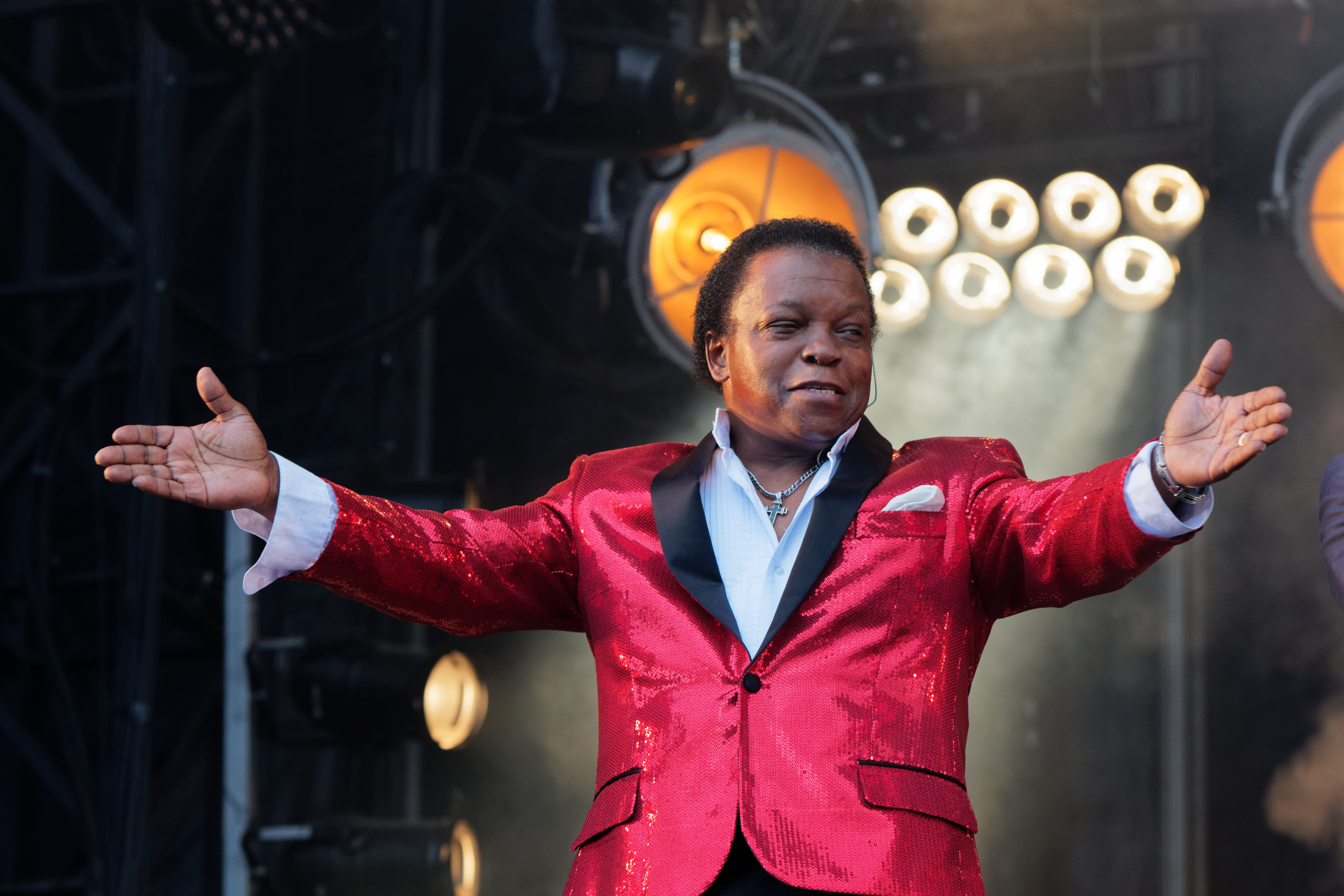
Lee Fields

=== 2017 ===
- Thursday, July 13: AllttA (20syl & Mr. J. Medeiros), Manu Chao La Ventura, Justice, Deluxe, Feder, Rocky
- Friday, July 14: Die Antwoord, Phoenix, Dropkick Murphys, Faada Freddy, Renaud, Kungs, MHD, Sônge, The Celtic Social Club
- Saturday, July 15: Arcade Fire, Jean-Michel Jarre, Kery James, Møme, Colorado, Clément Bazin
- Sunday, July 16: Macklemore & Ryan Lewis, DJ Snake, Matmatah, Radio Elvis, Killason, Octave Noire, Acid Arab
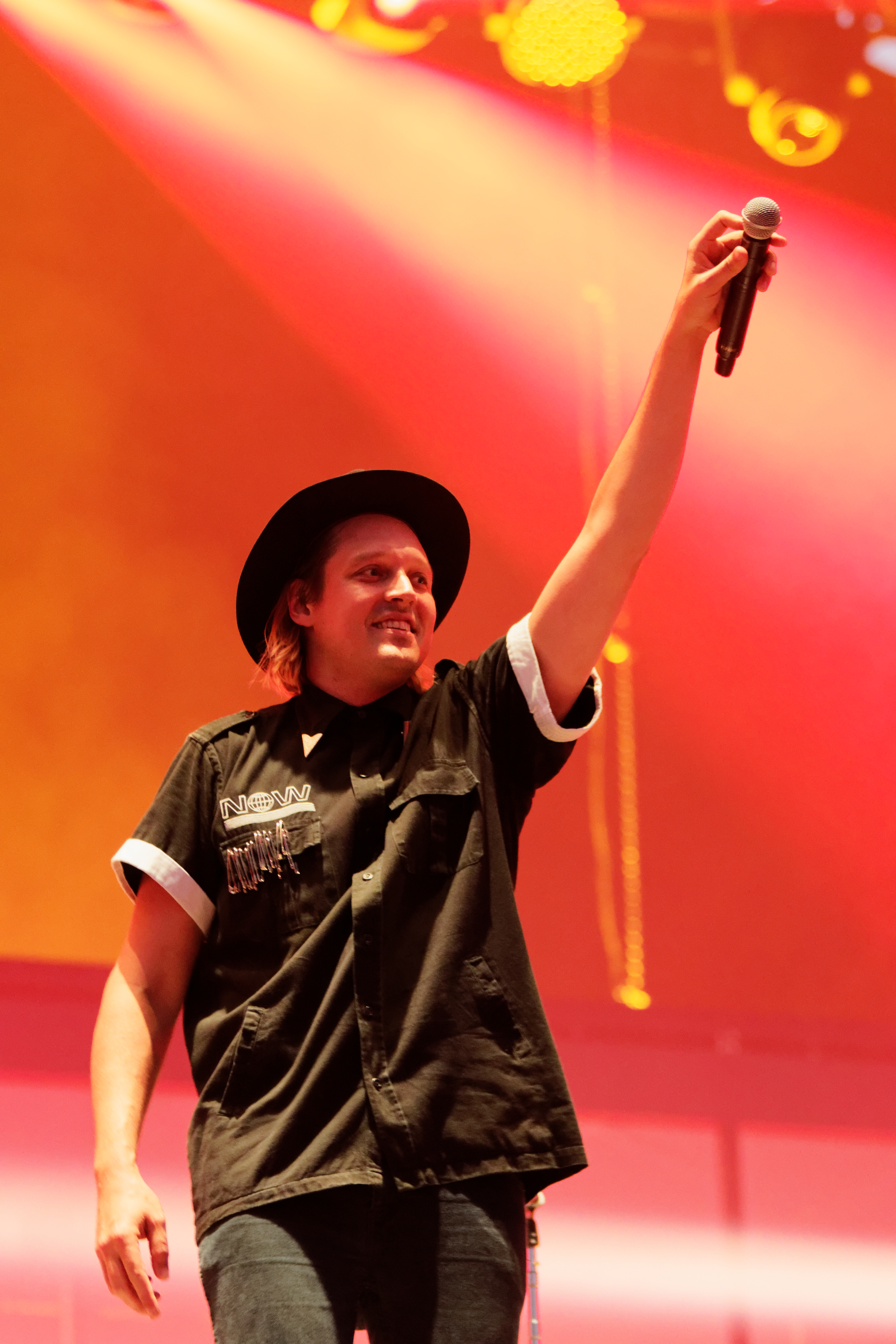
Arcade Fire

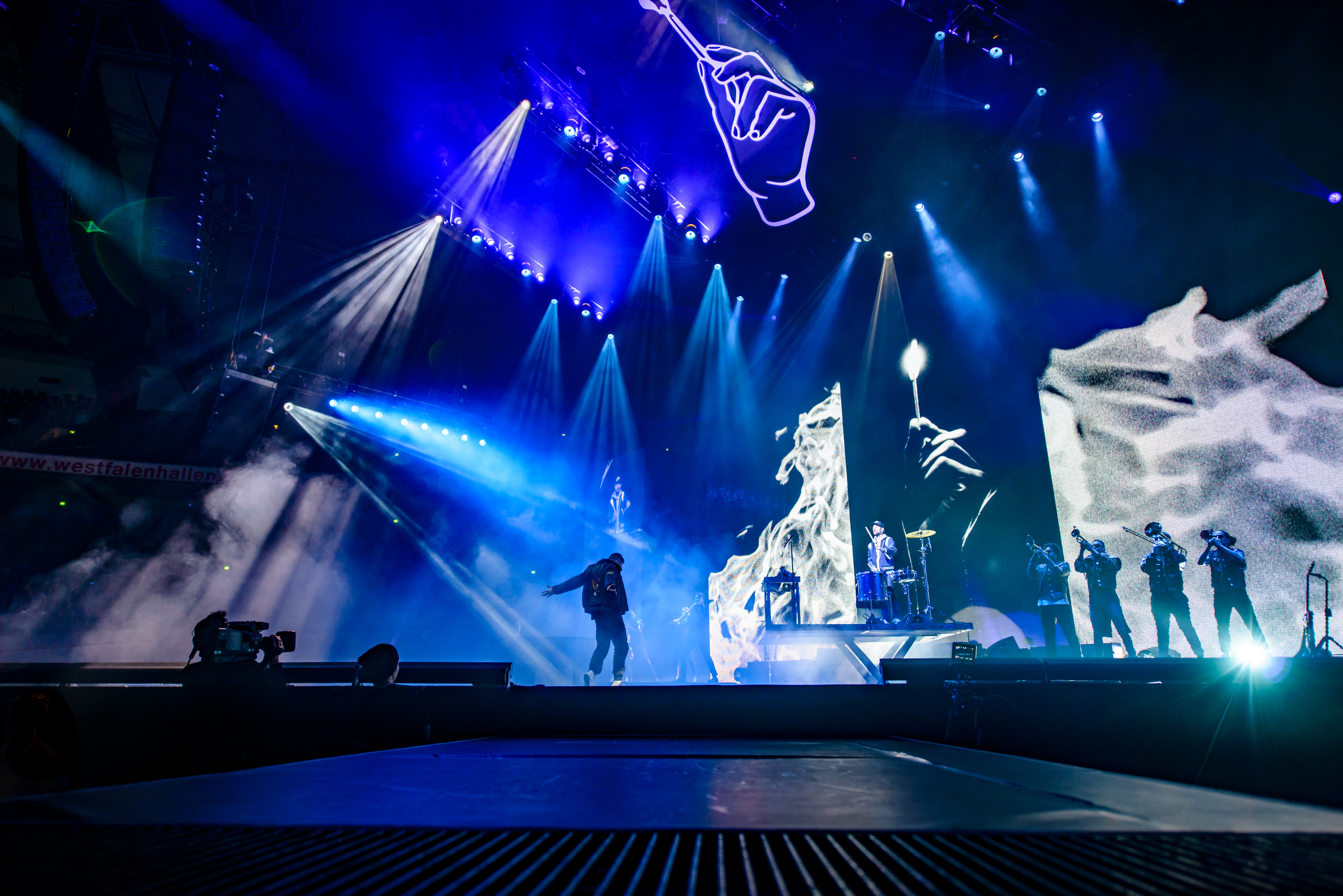
Macklemore & Ryan Lewis

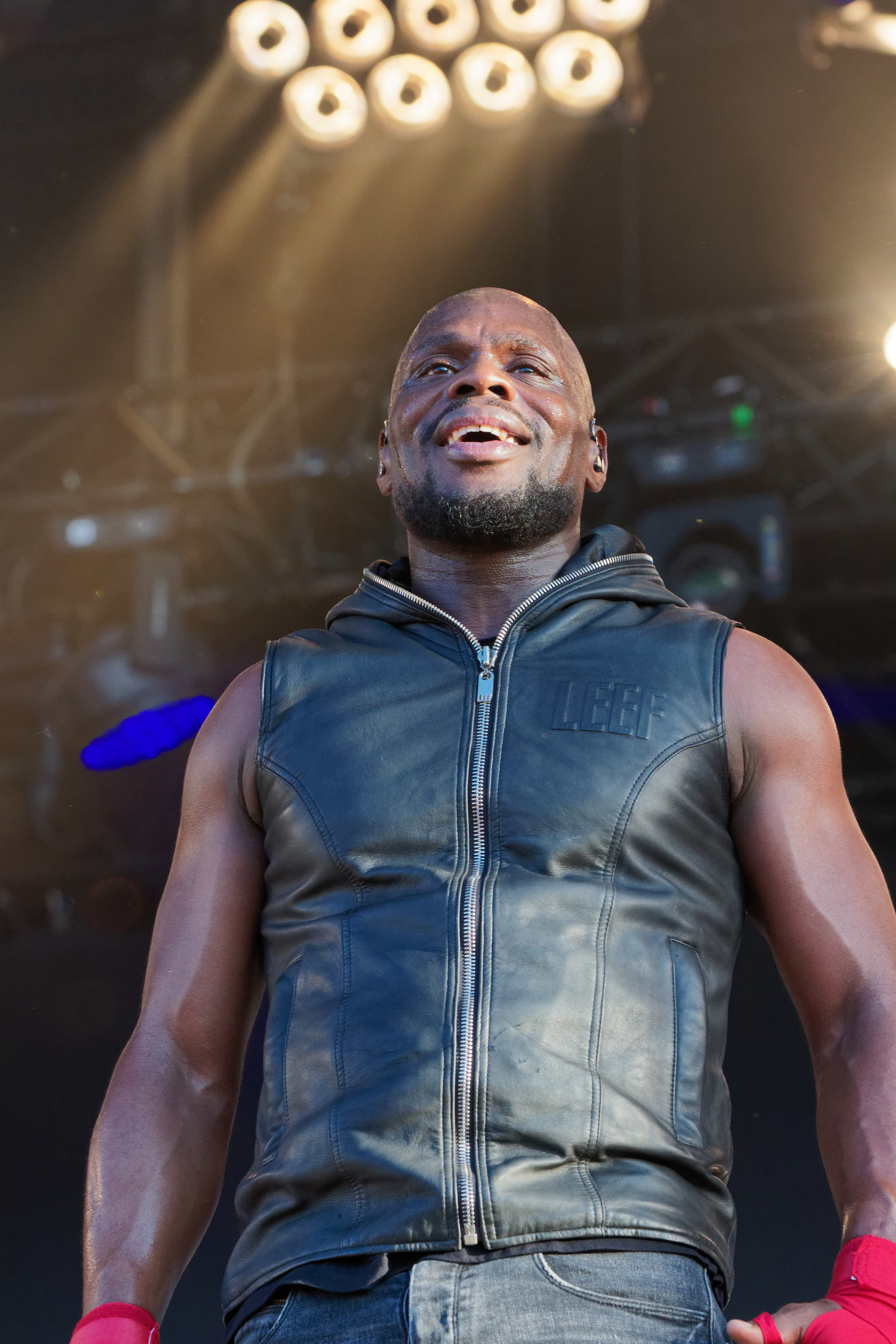
Kery James

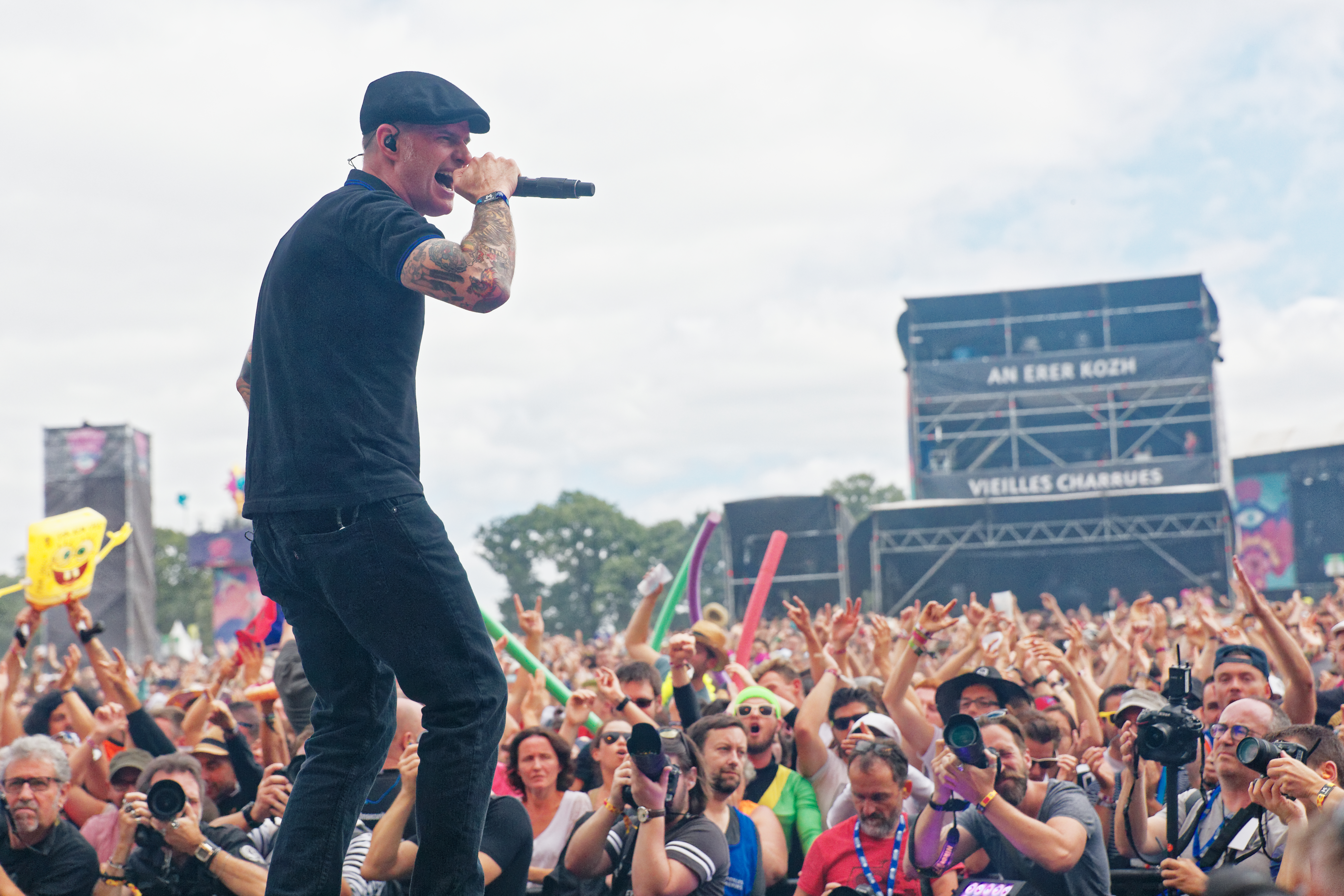
Dropkick Murphys

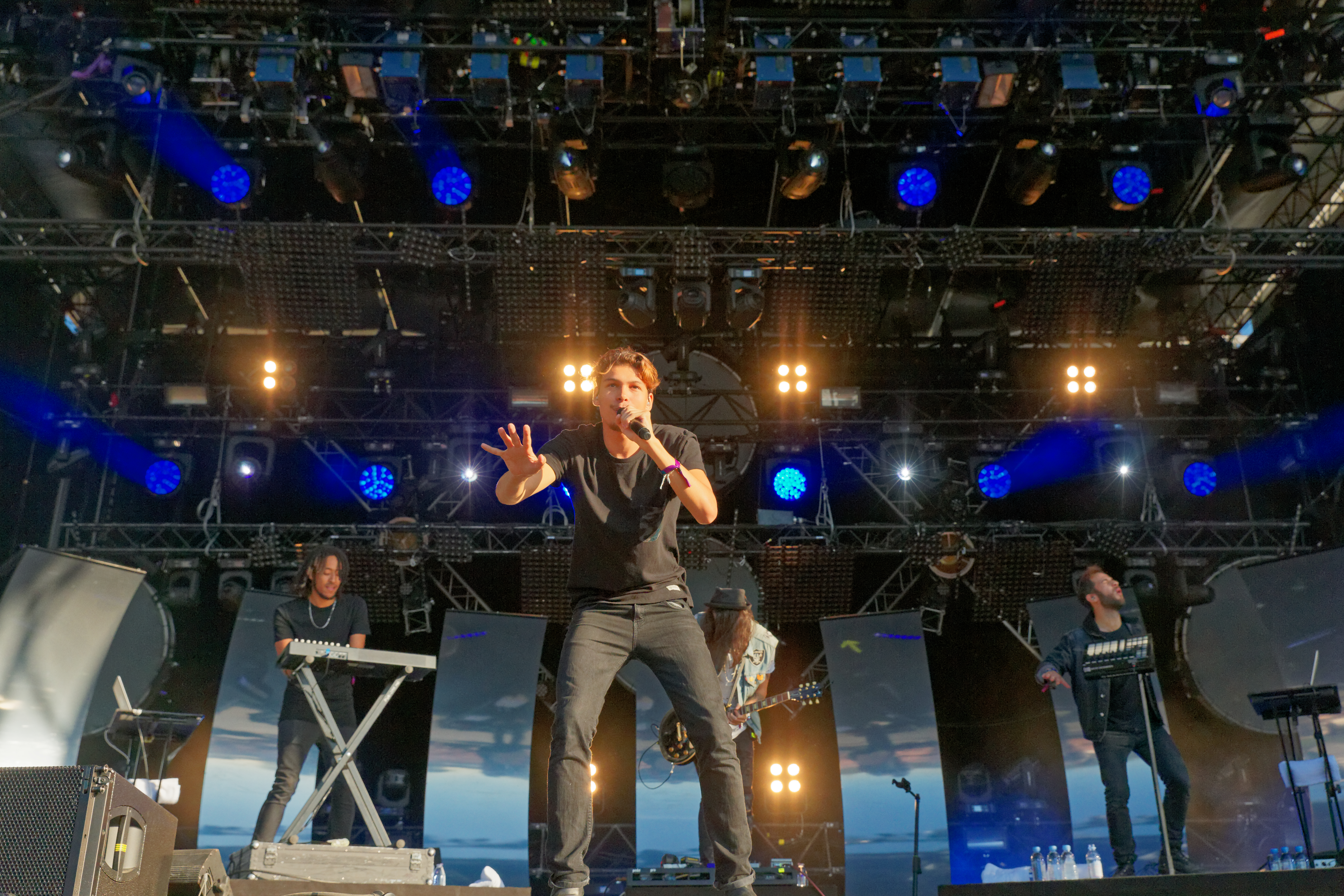
Georgio

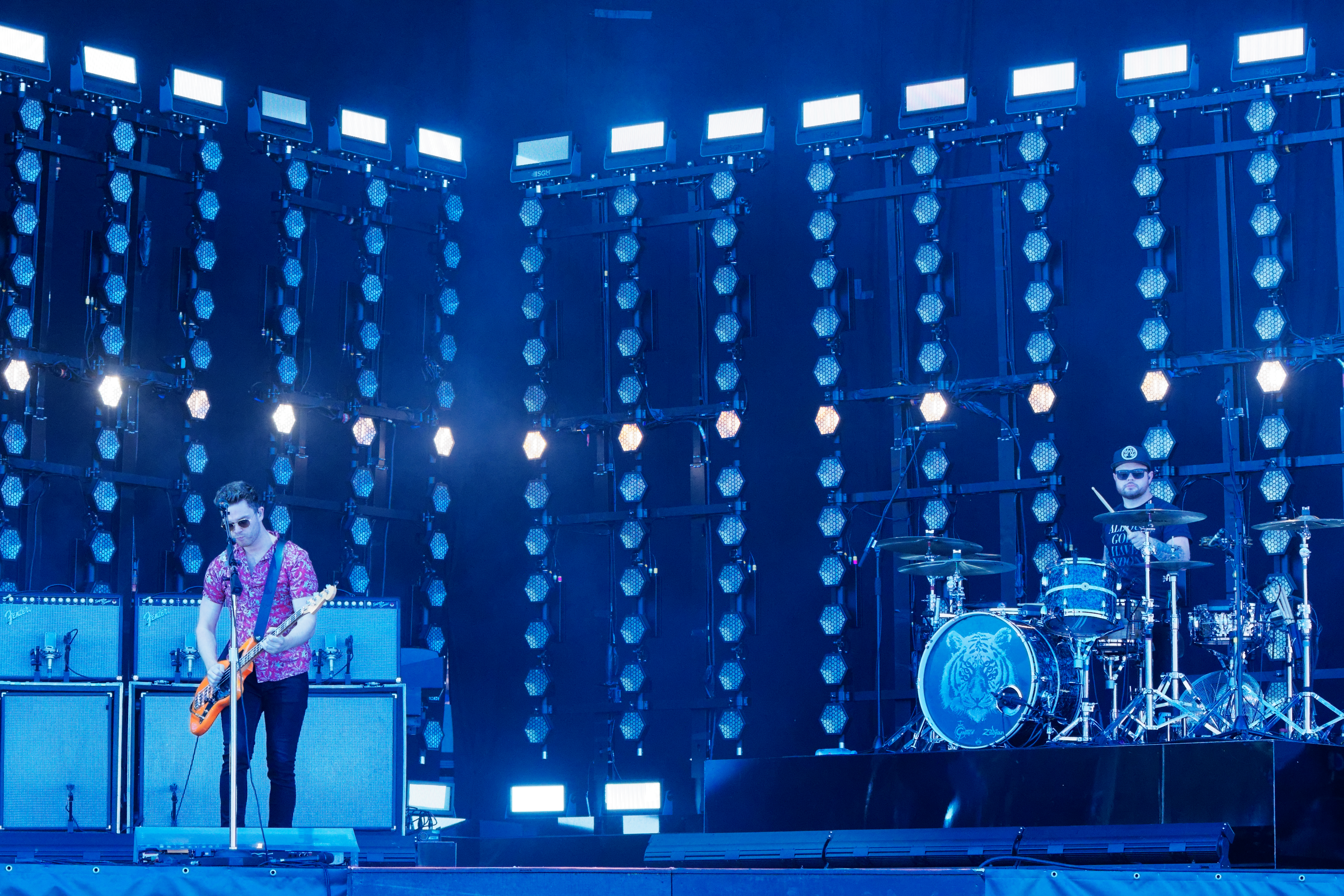
Royal Blood

=== 2016 ===
In New York City (Central Park), Summer Stage:

- Saturday, October 1: Matthieu Chedid (‑M-), The Avener, The Celtic Social Club (members of Red Cardell, The Silencers and others), Krismenn & Alem, Alan Corbel.

In Carhaix:

- Thursday, July 14: Les Insus (ex-Téléphone), The Kills, Étienne de Crécy, Guizmo, Mickey 3D, Louis-Jean Cormier, Jeanne Added, Last Train, Mansfield.TYA
- Friday, July 15: Pharrell Williams, Disclosure, Pixies, Michel Polnareff, Parov Stelar, Lou Doillon, Tindersticks, FIDLAR, Socalled, Dominic Sonic, Ropoporose
- Saturday, July 16: The Libertines, Louise Attaque, Alain Souchon and Laurent Voulzy, Suede, Ibrahim Maalouf, The Avener, Ibeyi, Hyphen Hyphen, Calypso Rose
- Sunday, July 17: Lana Del Rey, Major Lazer, Nekfeu, Louane, Jake Bugg, Editors, Lilly Wood and the Prick, Odesza, Denez Prigent, Jain, Sofiane Saïdi.
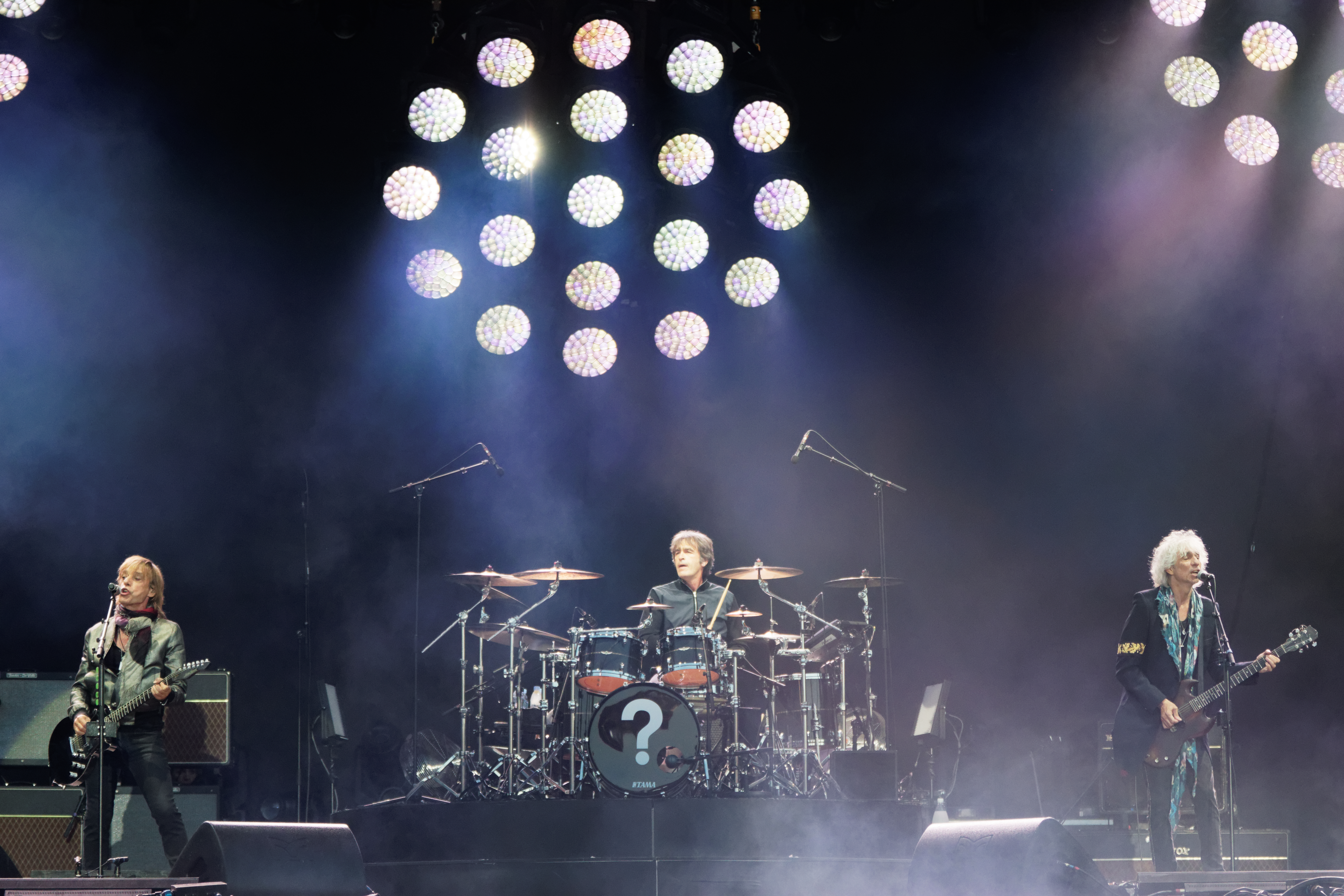
Les Insus (ex-Téléphone)

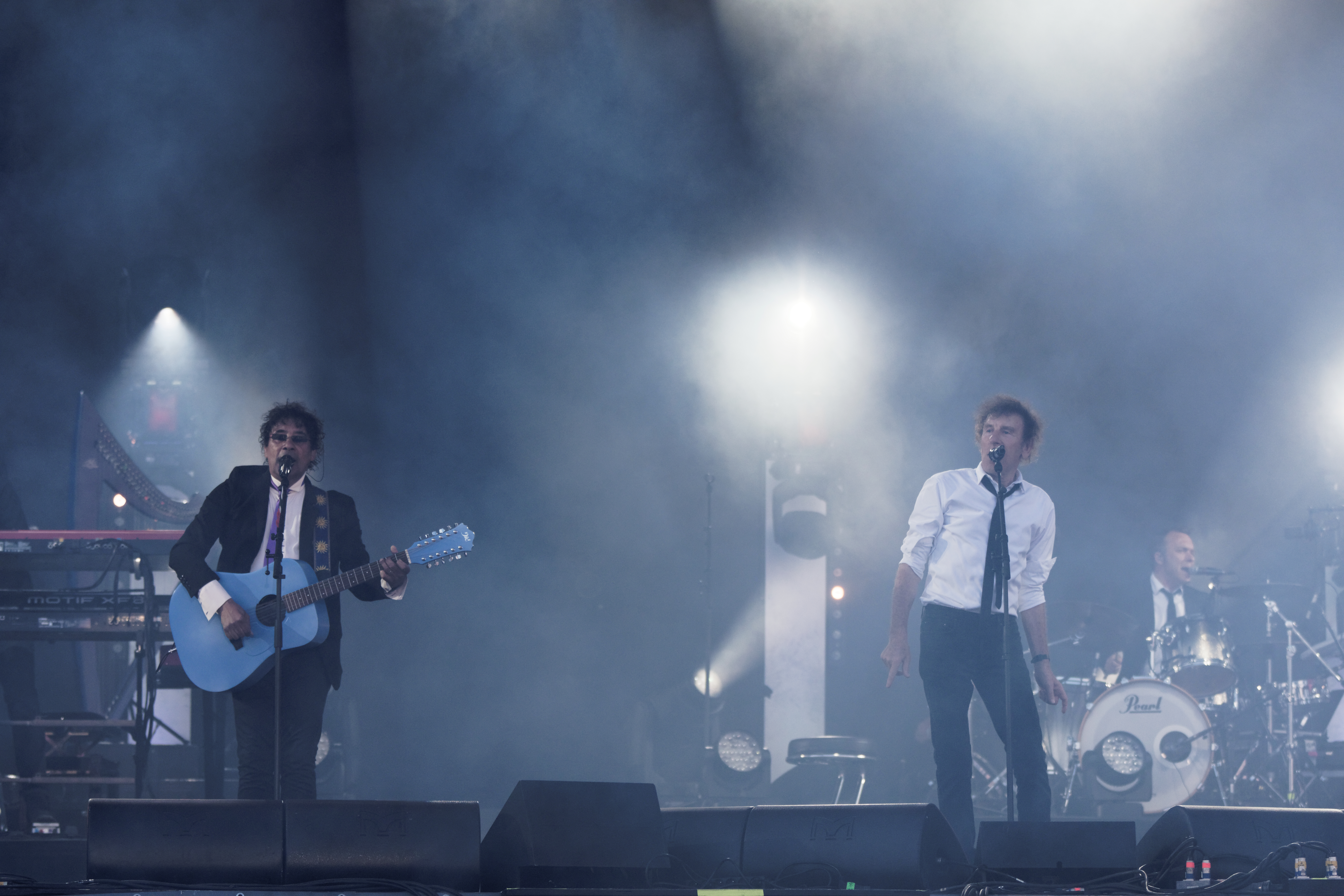
Alain Souchon & Laurent Voulzy

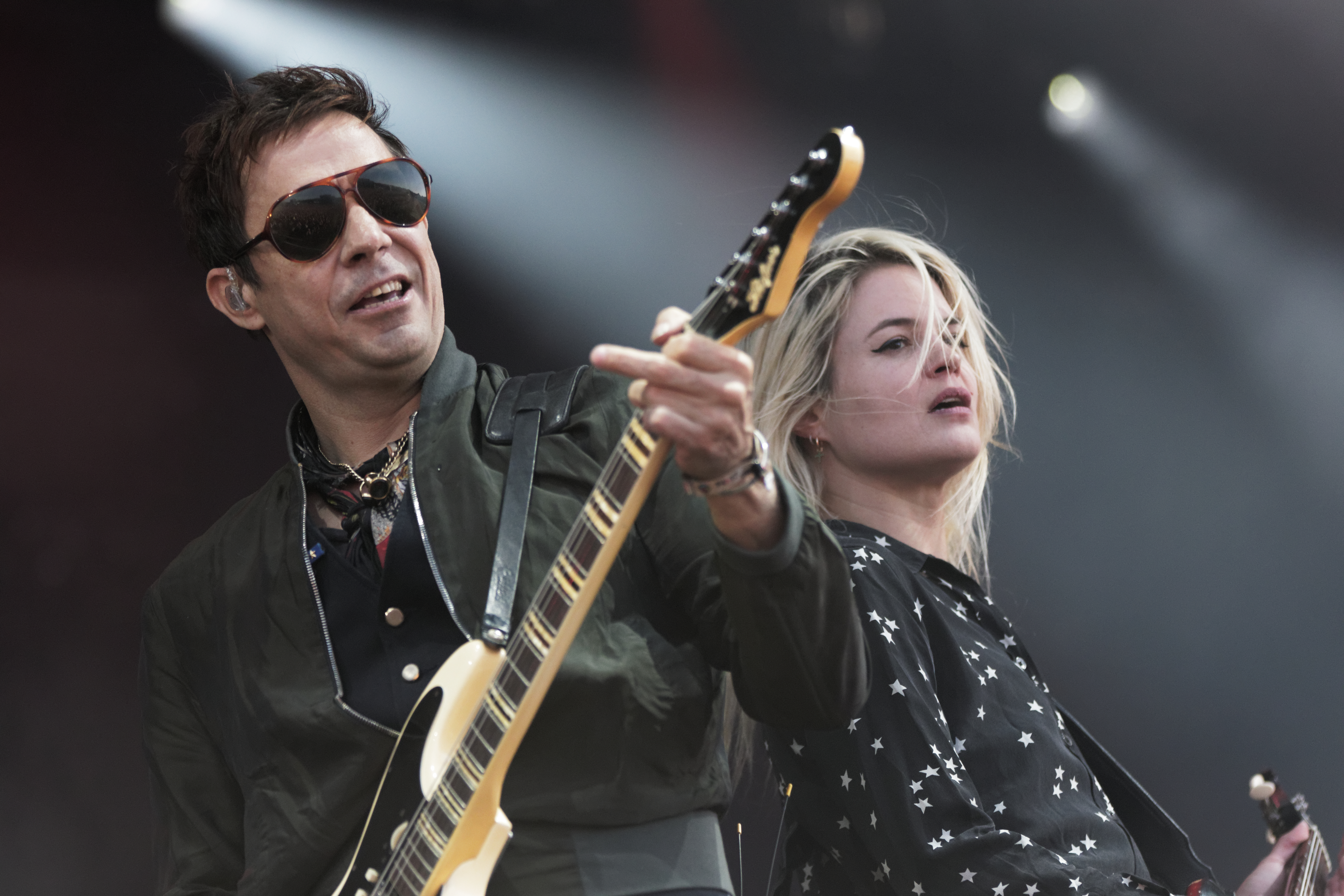
The Kills

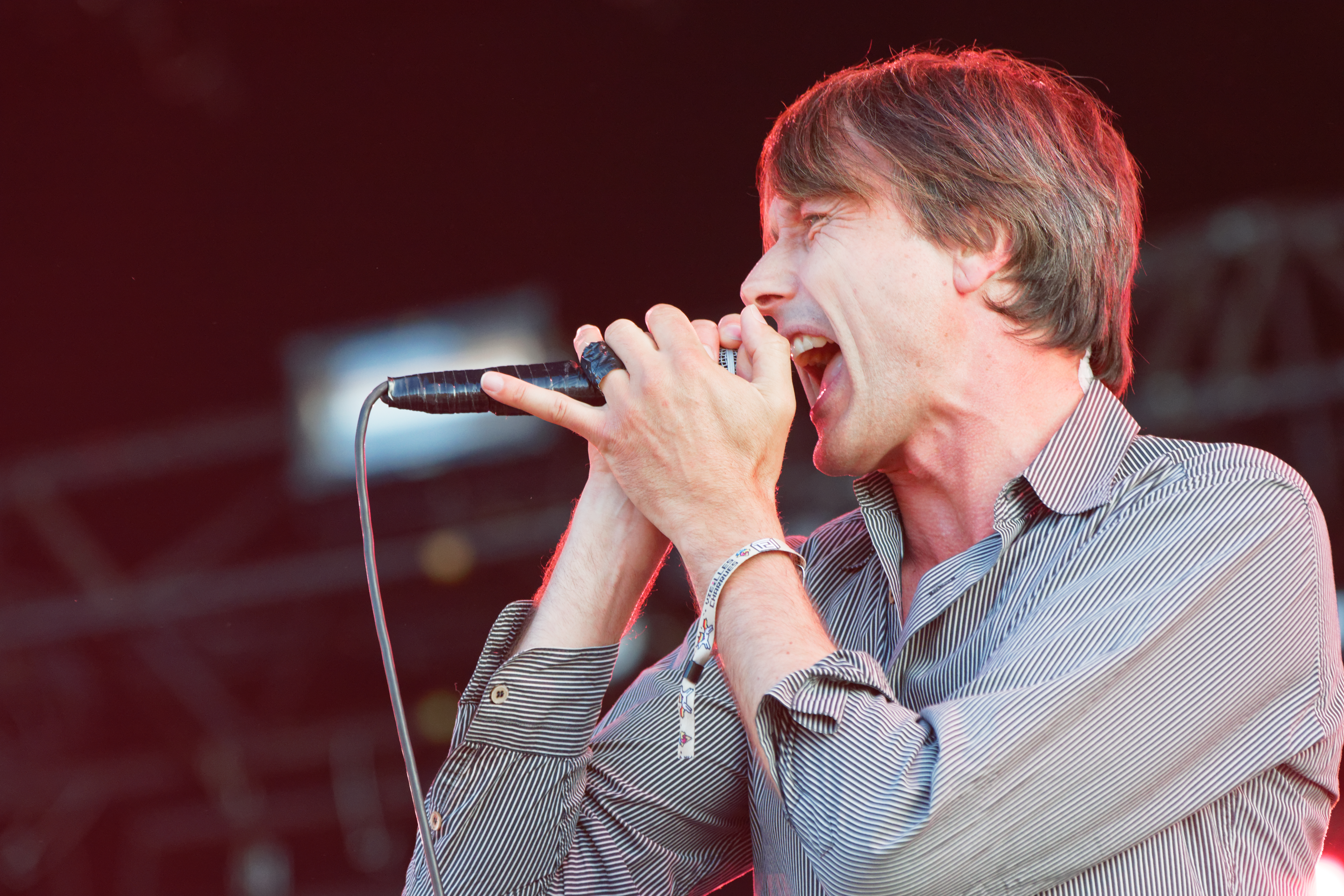
Suede

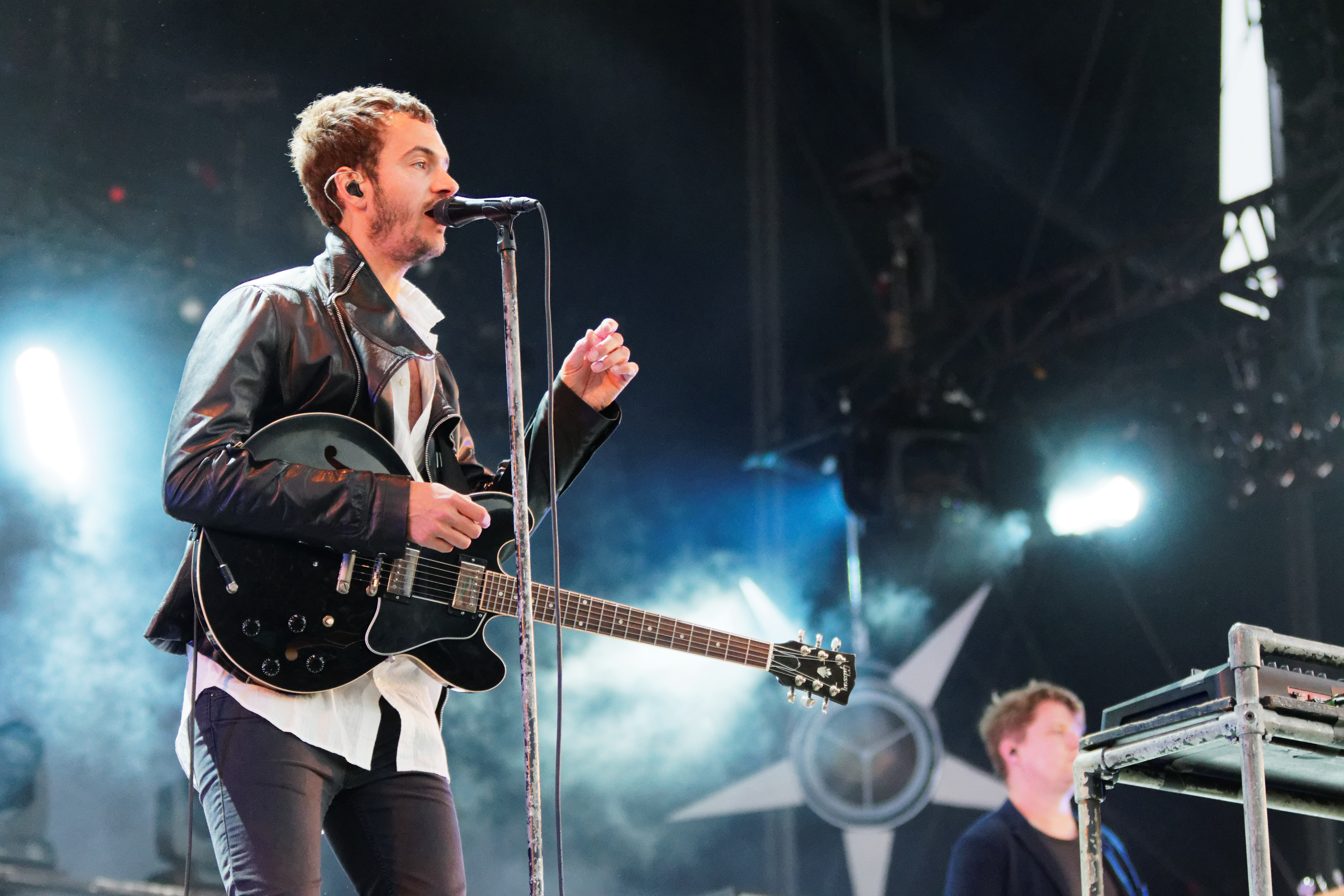
Editors

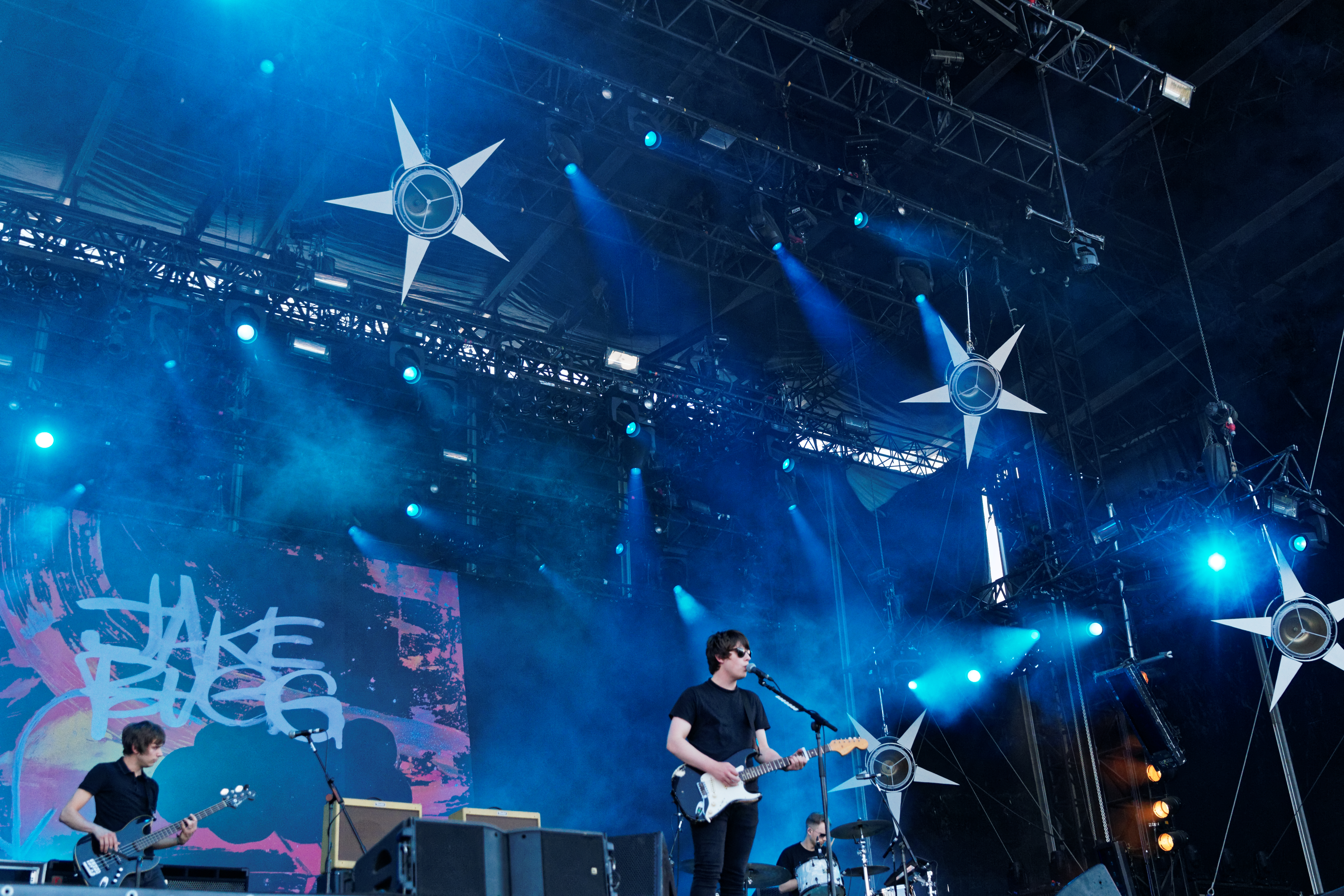
Jake Bugg

=== 2015 ===
- Thursday, July 16: Muse / Brodinski / Anna Calvi / Soprano
- Friday, July 17: The Chemical Brothers / Christine & The Queens / Tom Jones / Archive / The Do / Caravan Palace / Boris Brejcha / Ez3kiel
- Saturday, July 18: The Prodigy / Tony Allen Review feat Damon Albarn / Calogero / George Ezra / Caribbean Dandee / The Strypes / The Shoes / SBTRKT
- Sunday, July 19: Lionel Richie / David Guetta / Joan Baez / London Grammar / Flume / Dominique A / Brigitte / The Drums / La Fine Équipe / Puts Marie
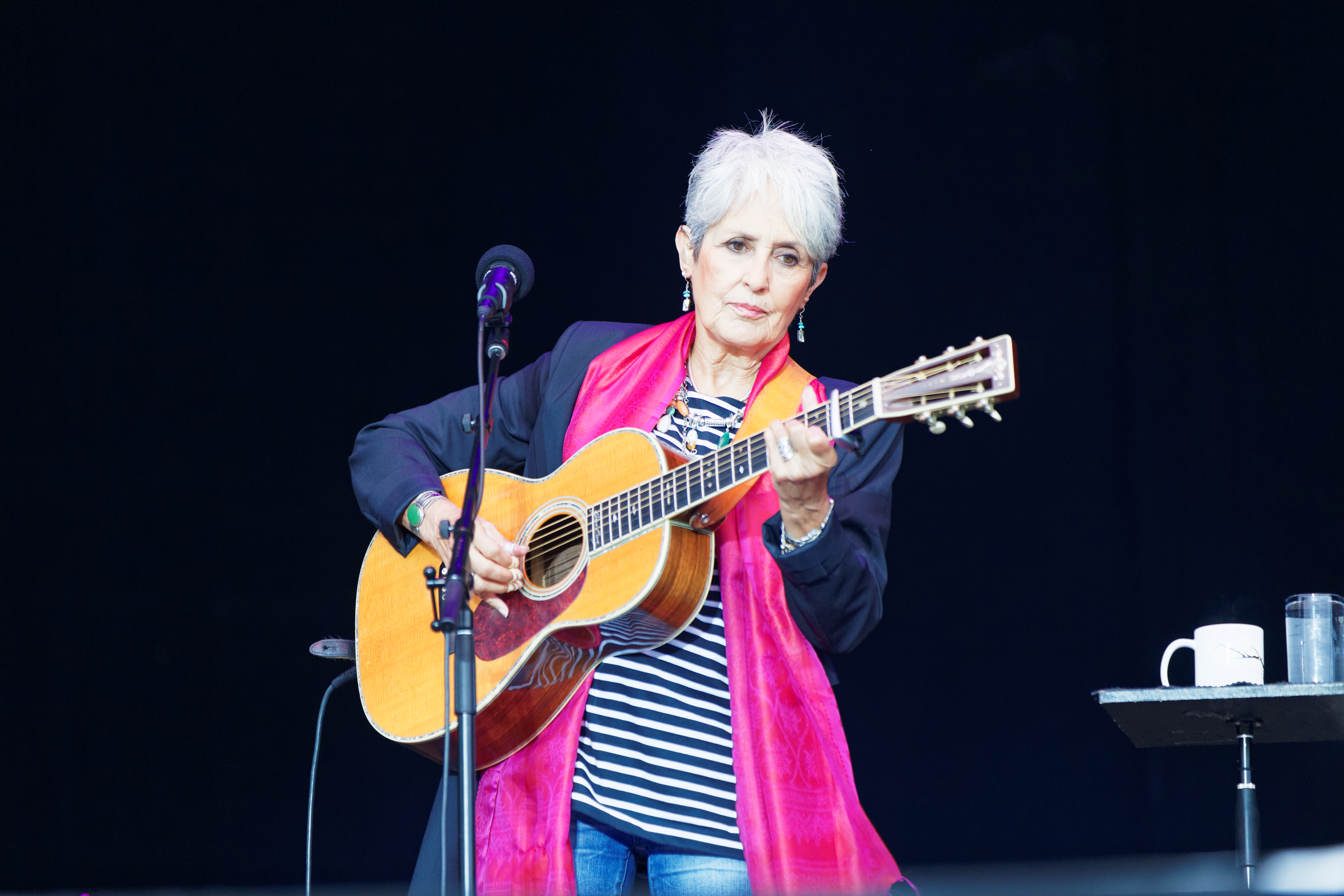
Joan Baez

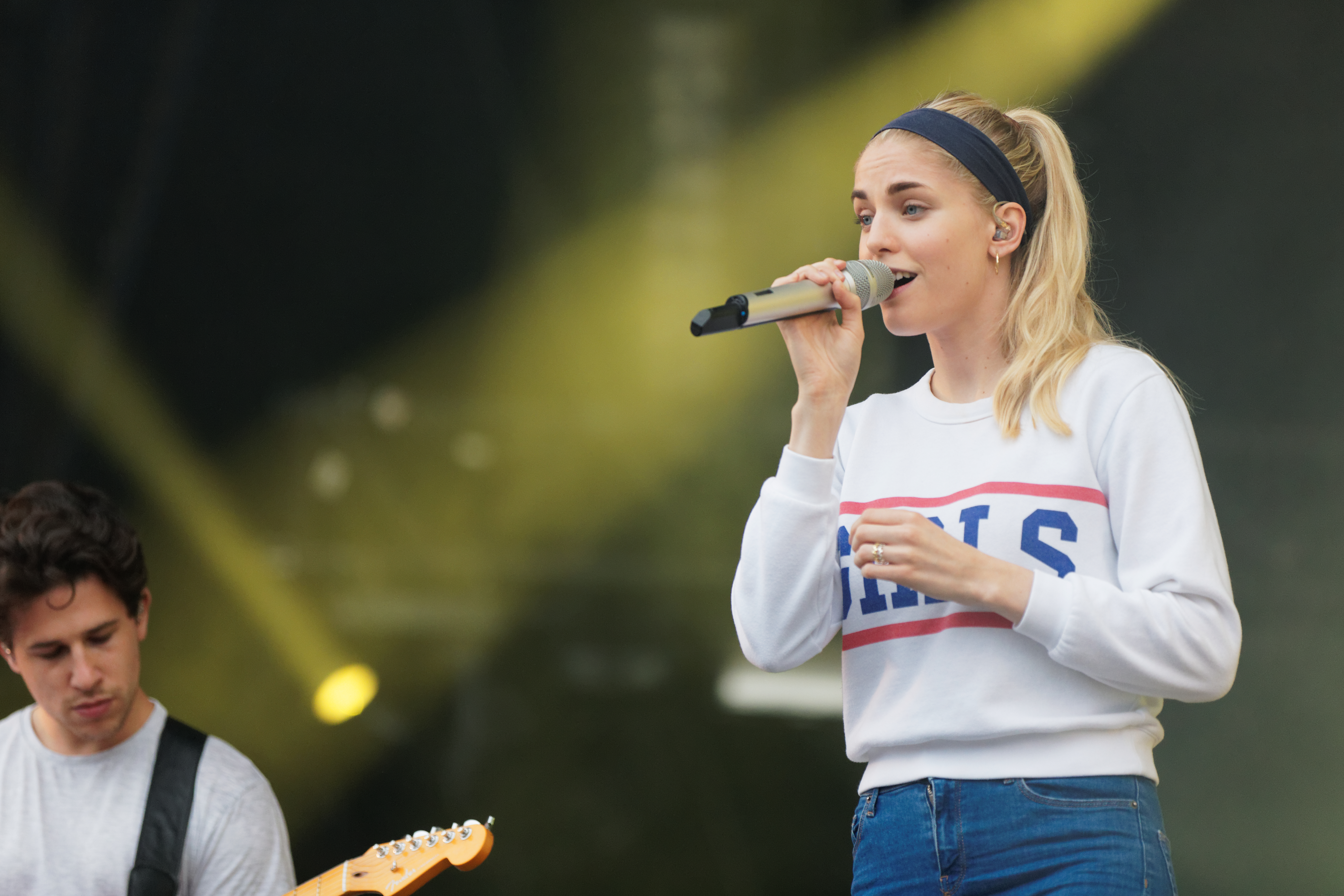
London Grammar

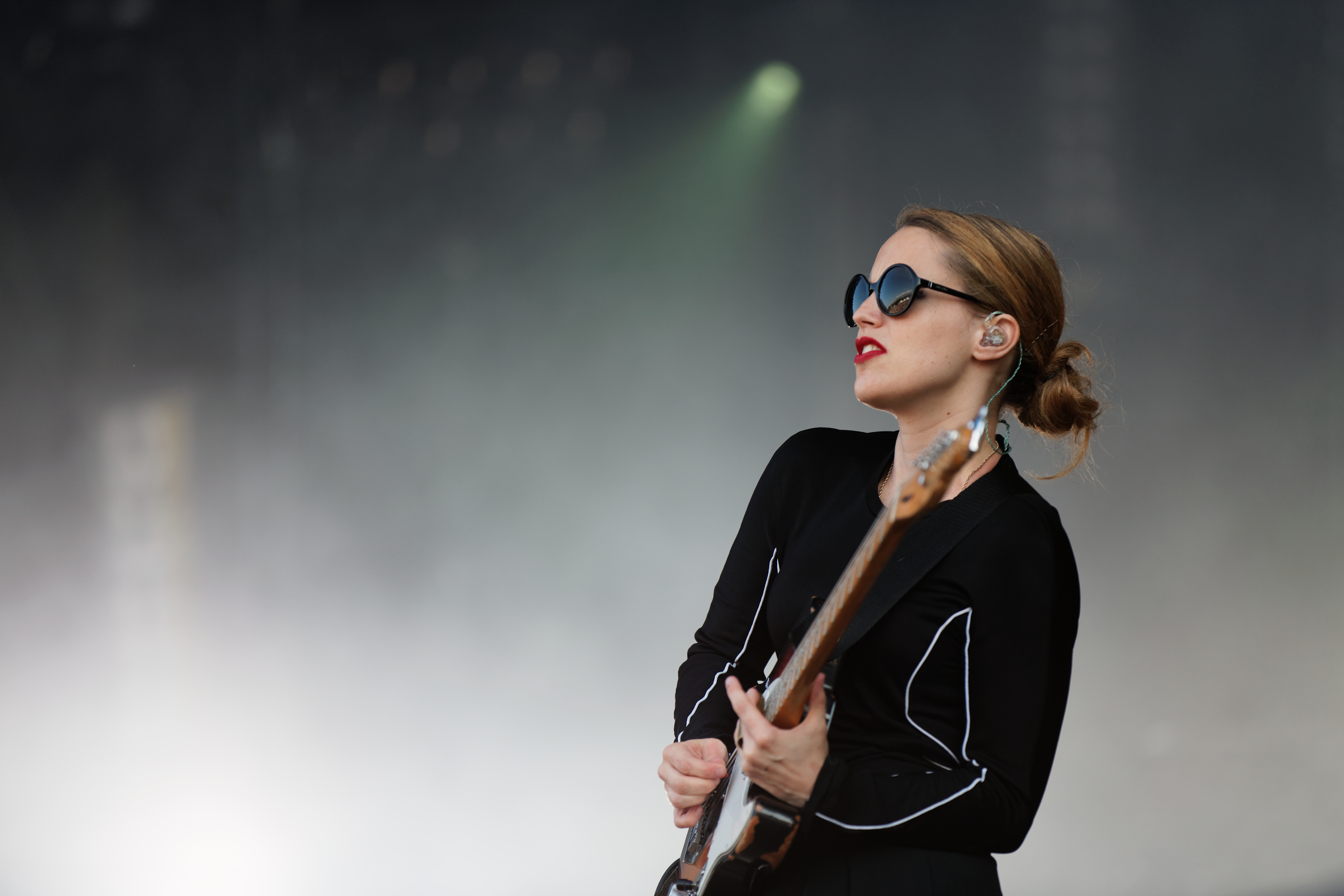
Anna Calvi

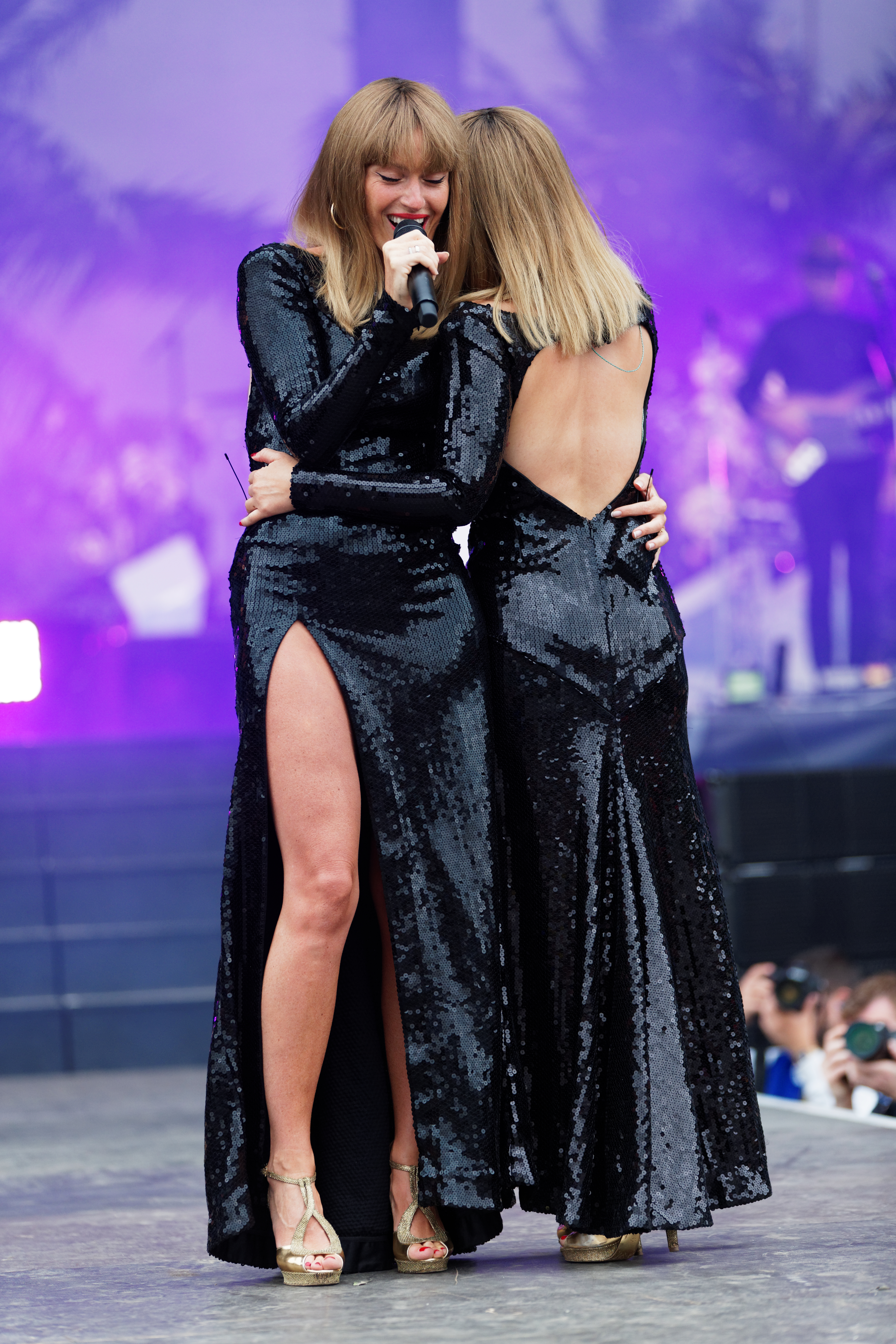
Brigitte

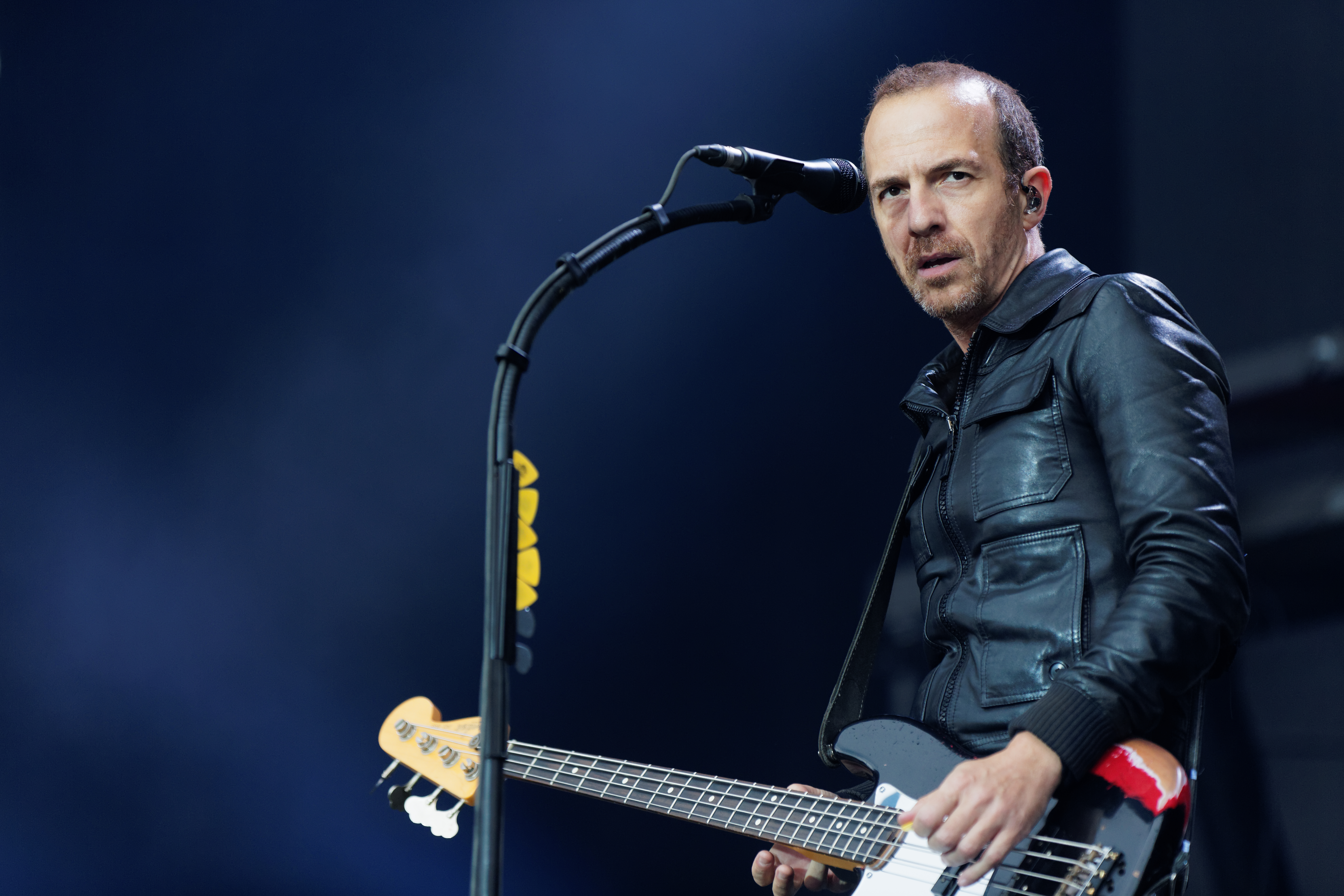
Calogero

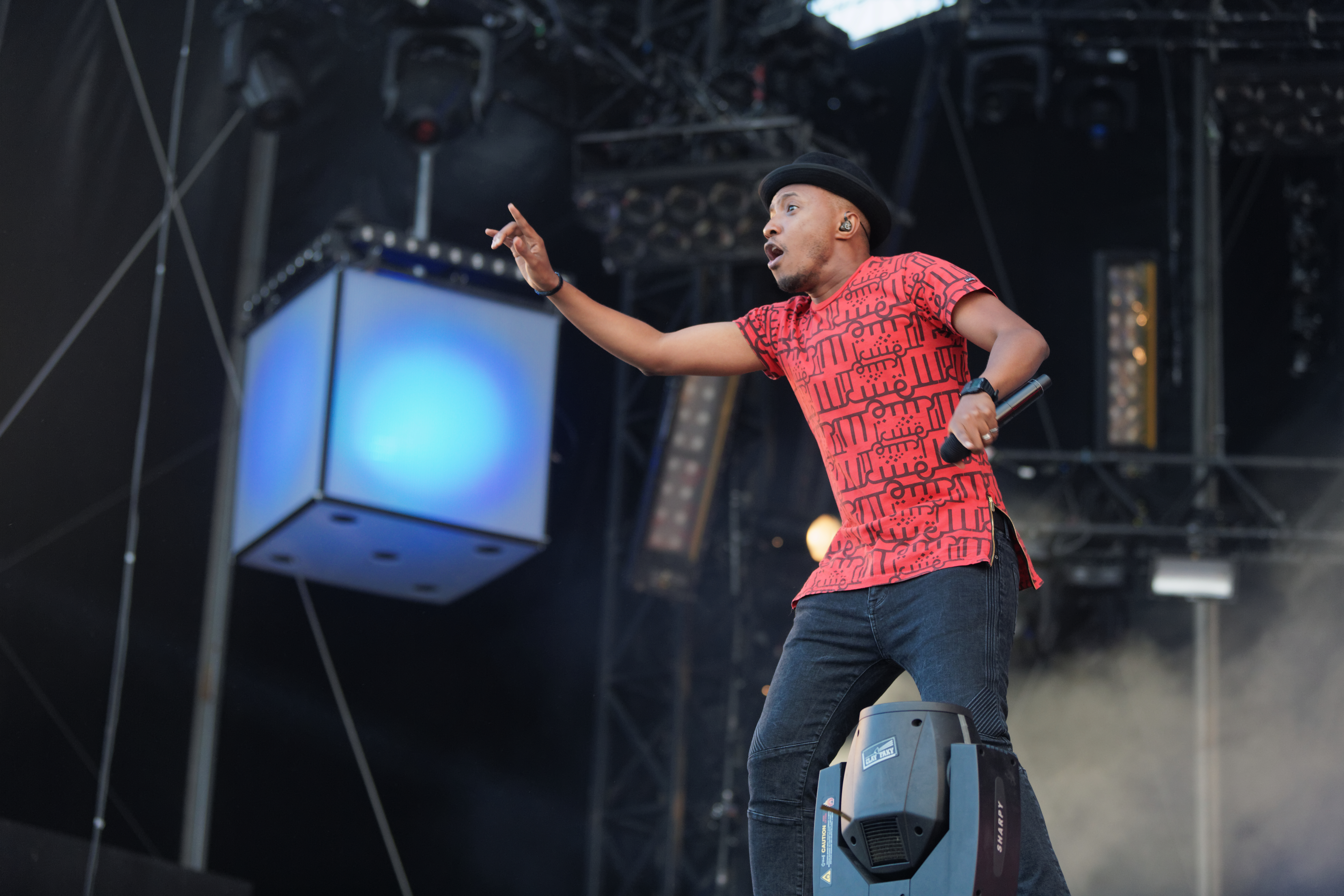
Soprano

=== 2014 ===
- Thursday, July 17: The Black Keys / Fauve / Skip the Use / Indochine / Vanessa Paradis / Christine And The Queens / Bakermat / Francois & The Atlas Mountains
- Friday, July 18: Stromae / Franz Ferdinand / Elton John / The Celtic Social Club / Miossec / Gesaffelstein / Tinariwen / The Same Old Band
- Saturday, July 19: Arctic Monkeys / Breton / Shaka Ponk / Détroit / Julien Doré / Diplo / The Red Goes Black / Falabella
- Sunday, July 20: Thirty Seconds To Mars / Miles Kane / Girls In Hawaii / Lily Allen / Yodelice / Etienne Daho / Ky-Mani Marley / Totorro
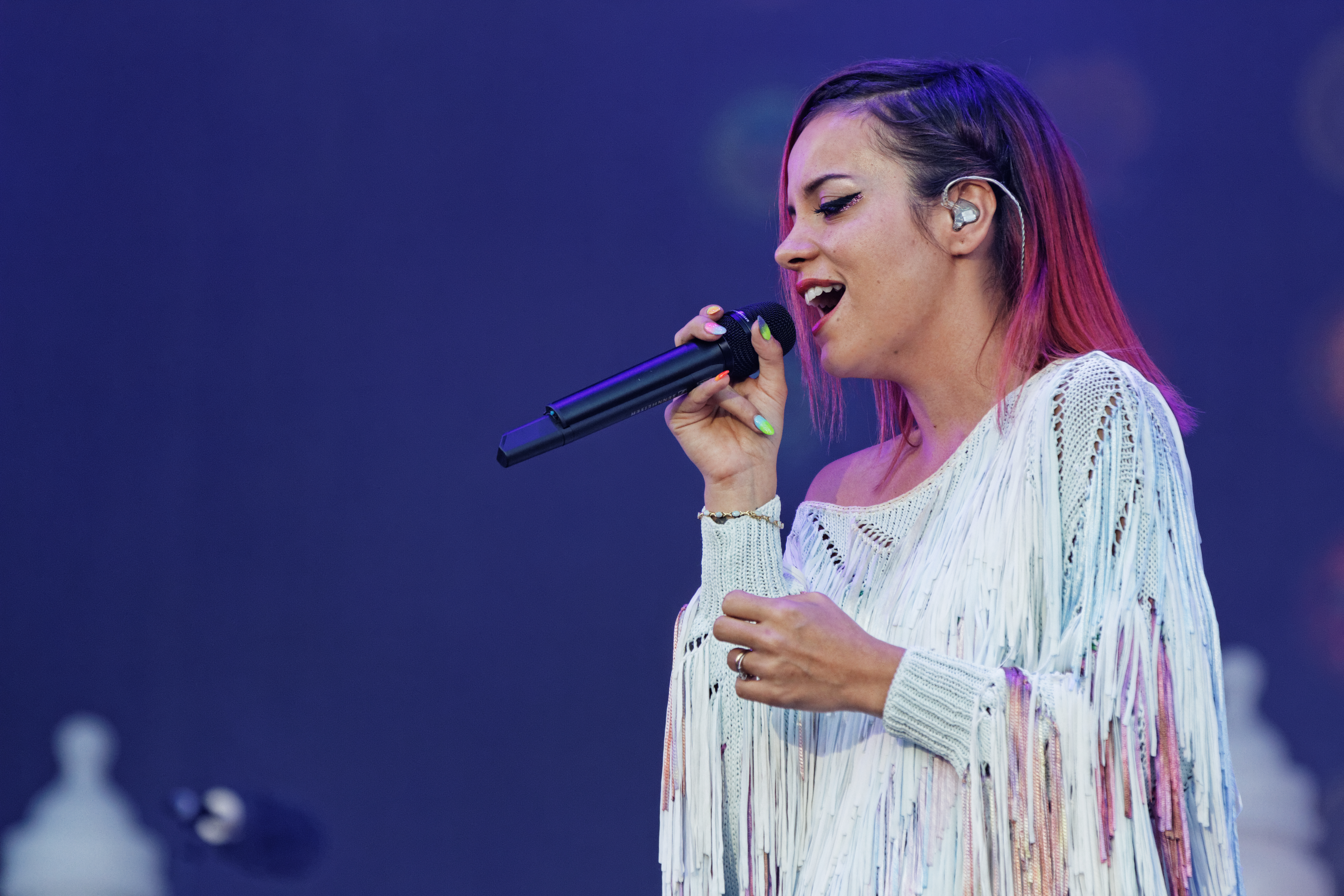
Lily Allen

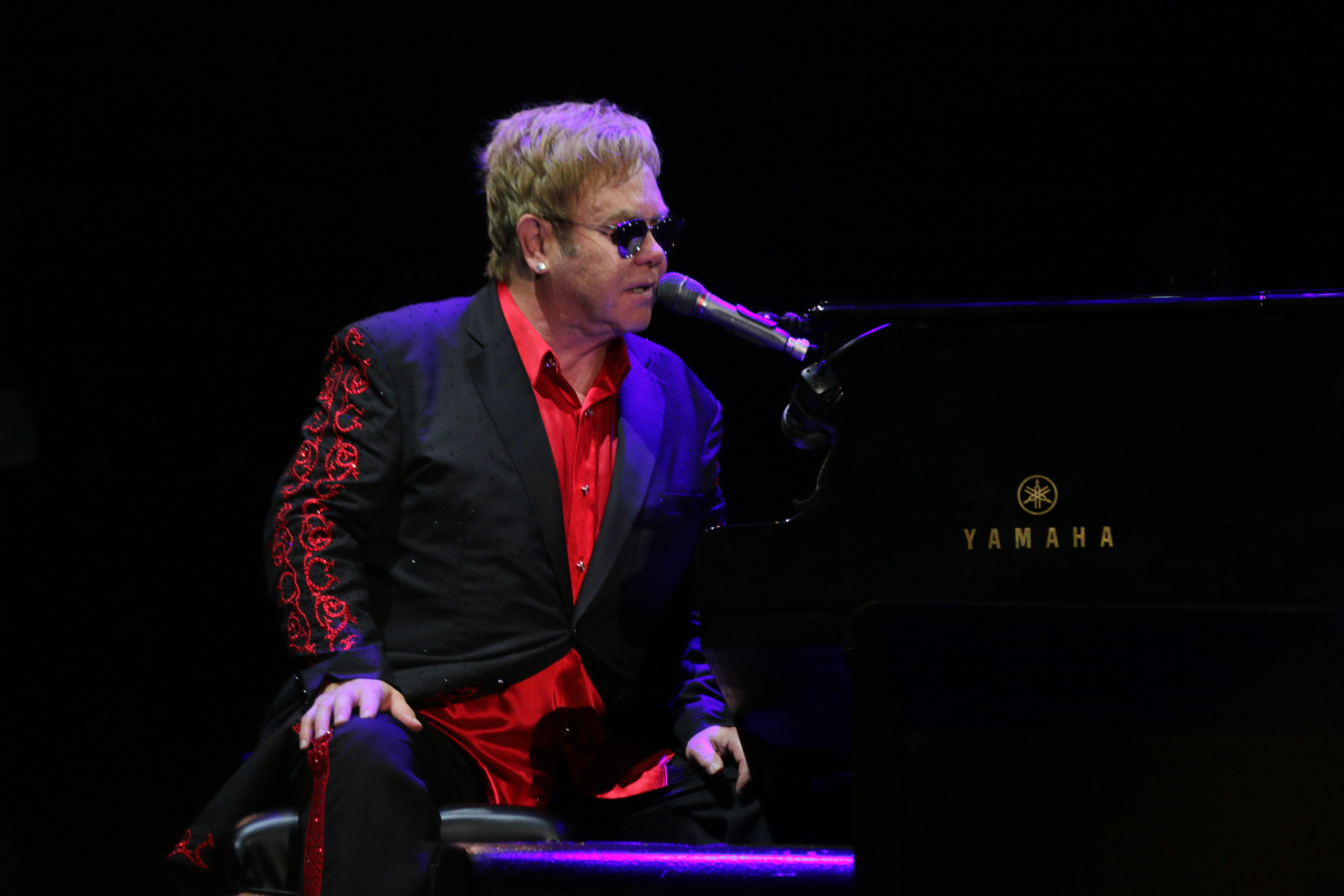
Elton John

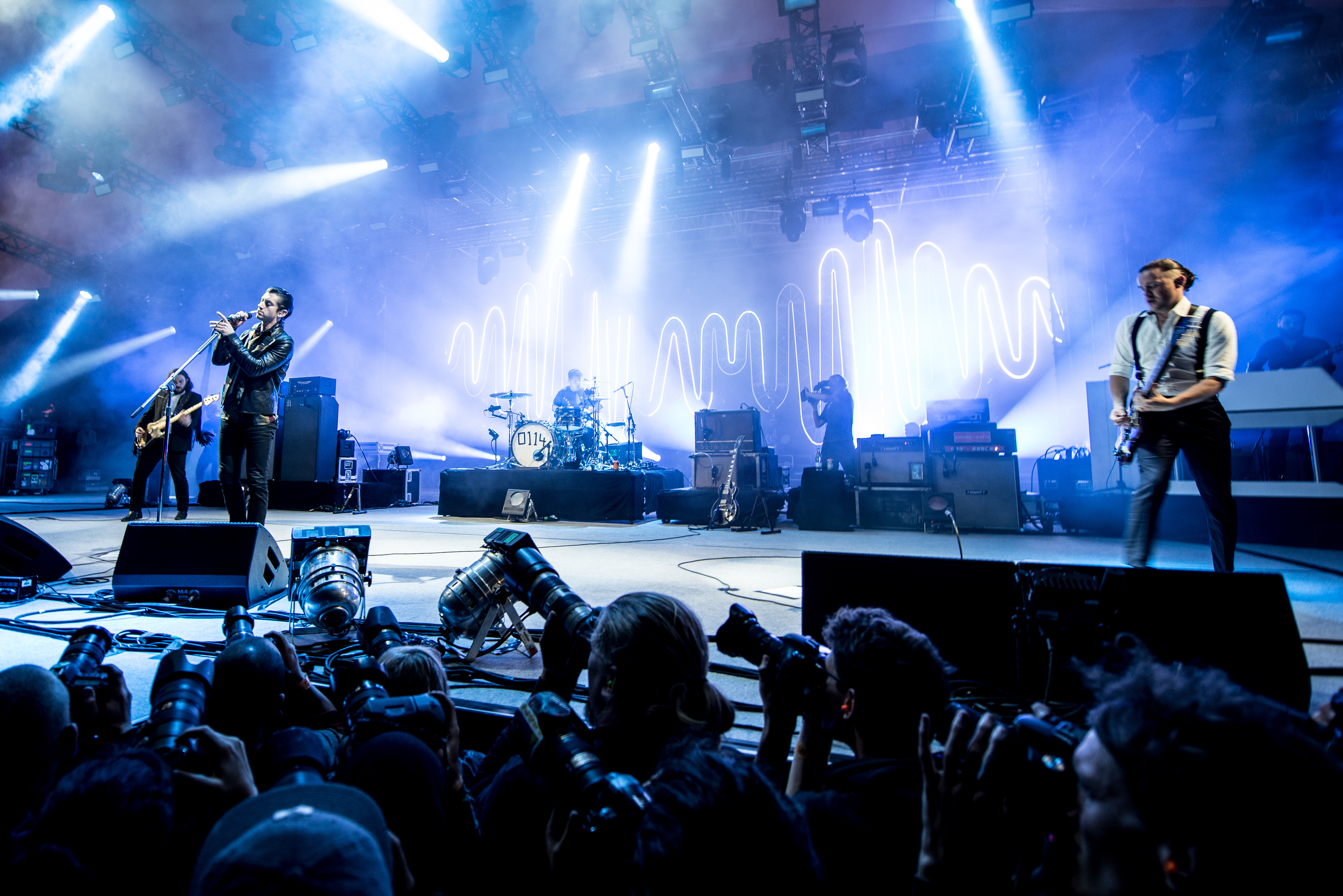
Arctic Monkeys

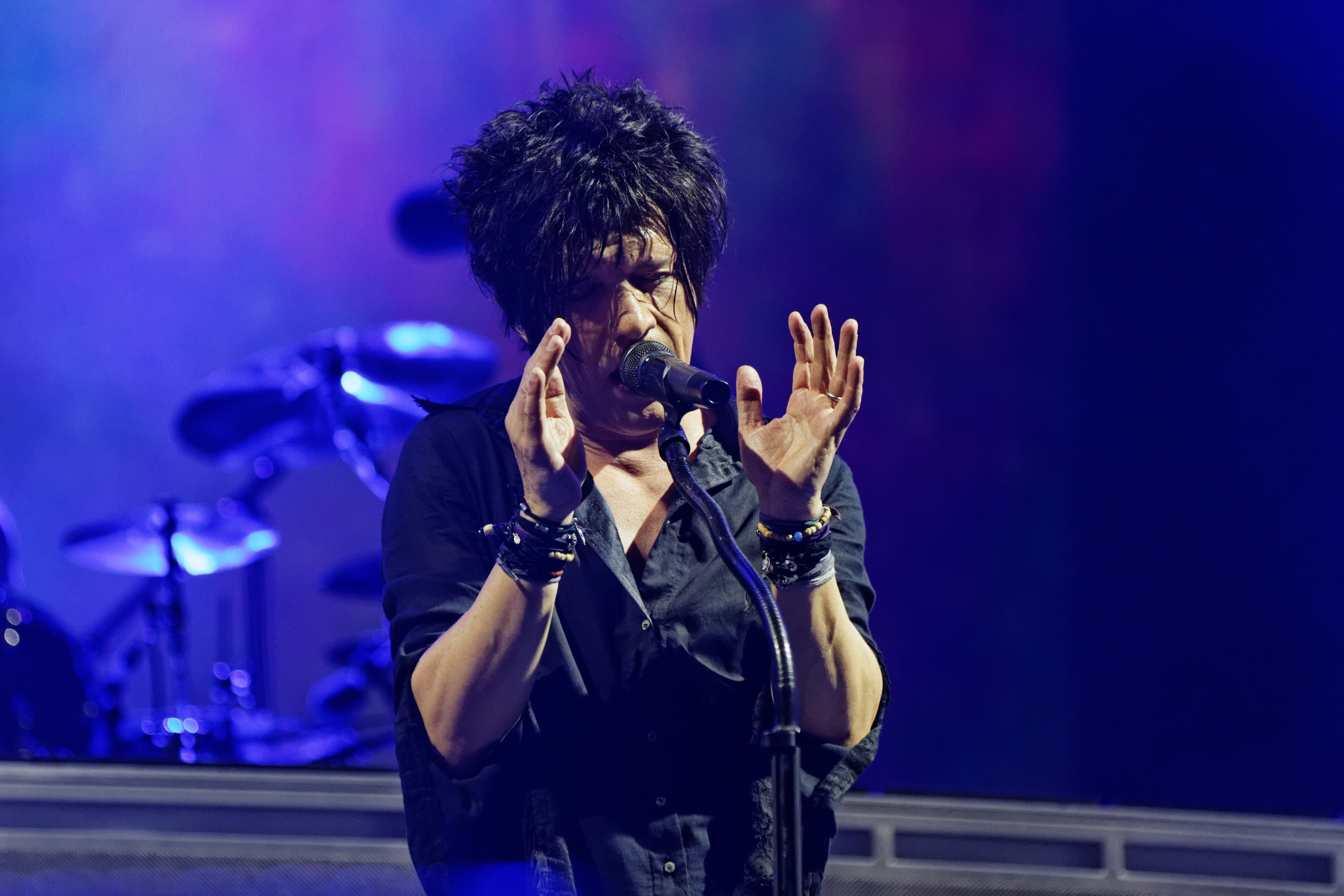
Indochine

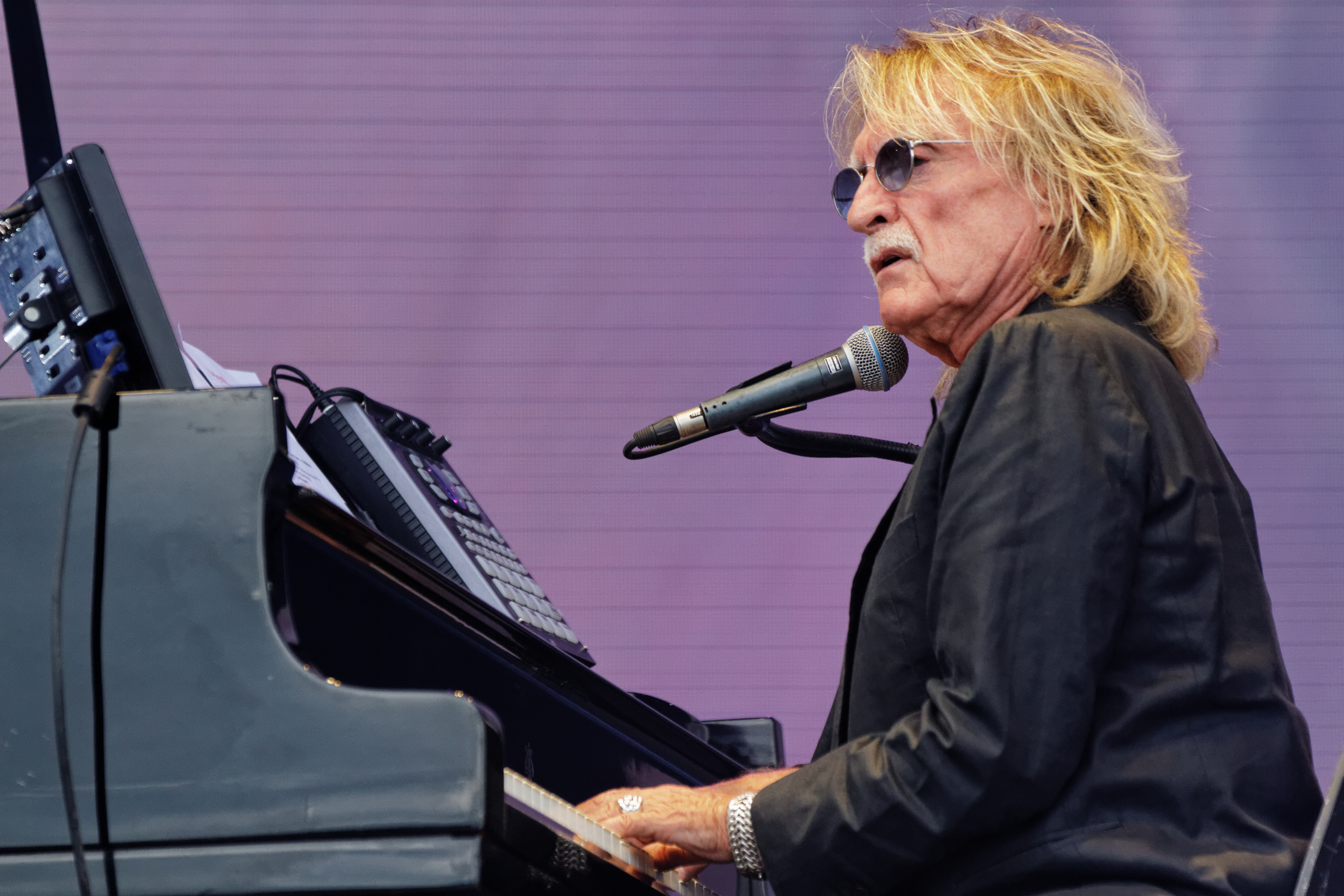
Christophe

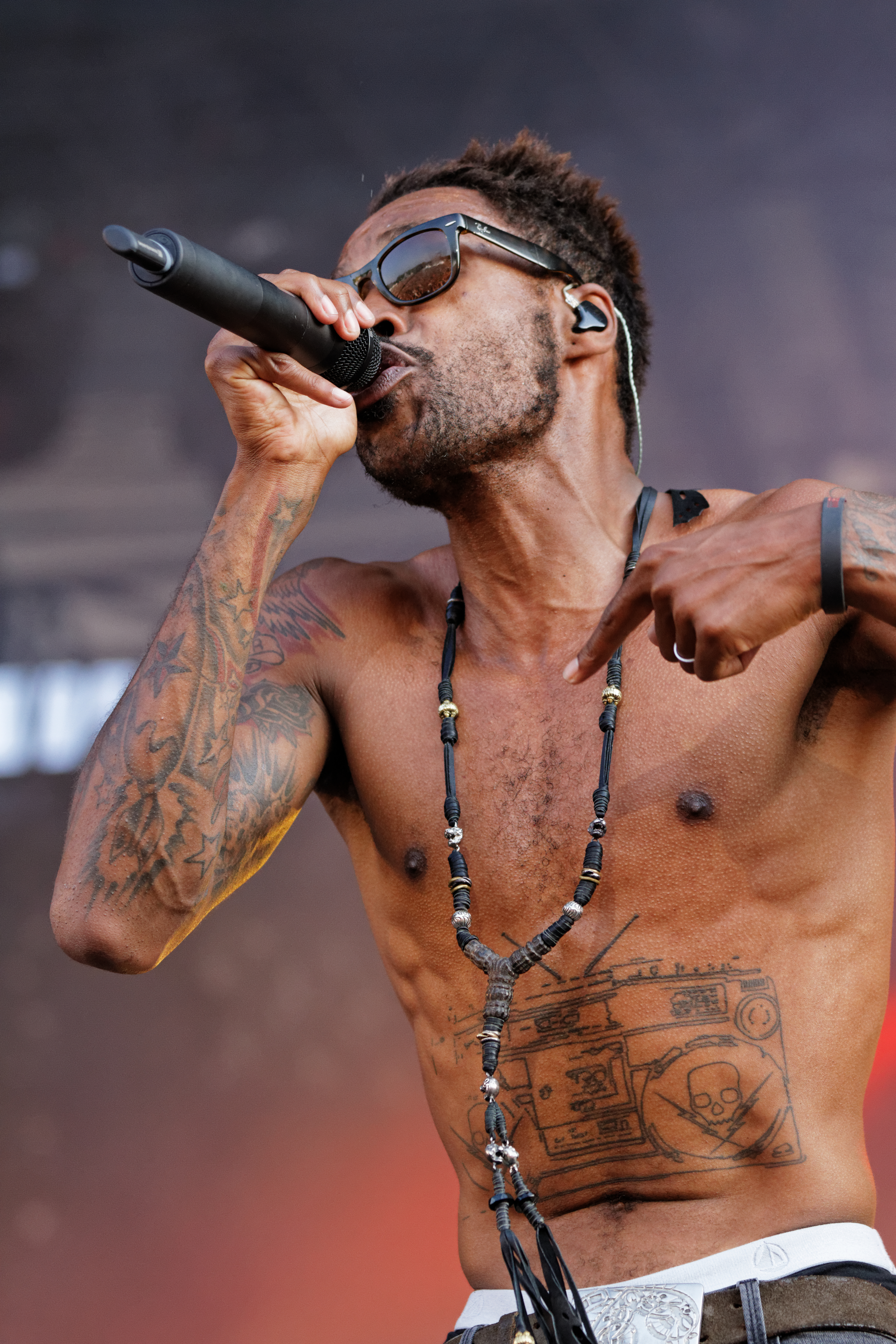
Skip the Use

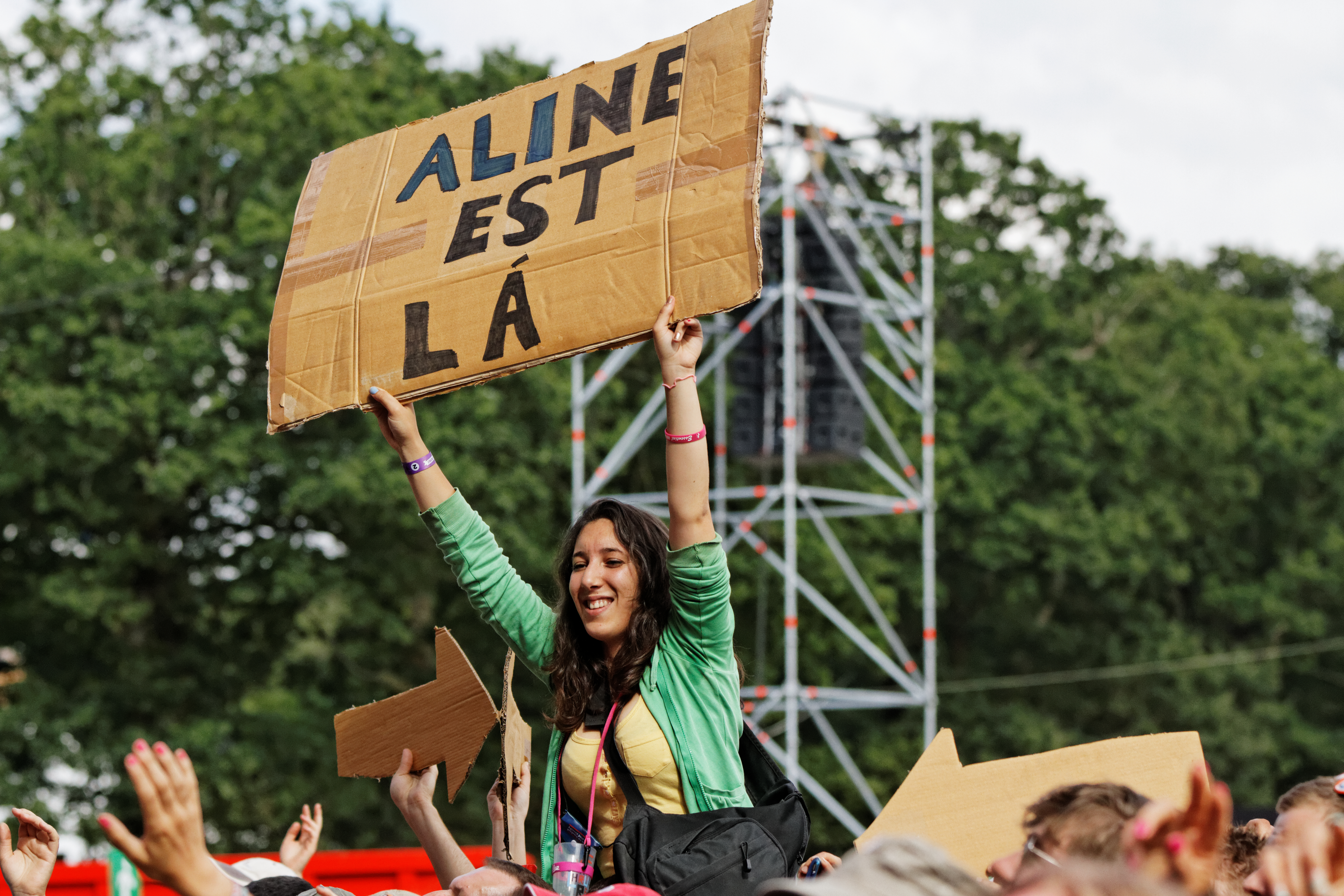
Public

=== 2013 ===
- Thursday, July 18: Rammstein, The Hives, Raphaël, Vitalic
- Friday, July 19: Patrick Bruel, Two Door Cinema Club, -M-, Lilly Wood and the Prick, Keny Arkana, Naive New Beaters, Paul Kalkbrenner, Rokia Traoré, Suuns, BRNS, Half Moon Run, Juveniles, Lescop, Rangleklods, Youn Sun Nah, Jacky Molard Acoustique Quartet, Elektrik Gem, Serendou
- Saturday, July 20: Neil Young, Asaf Avidan, Benjamin Biolay, Oxmo Puccino, Féfé, The Roots, Gentleman, Hanni El Khatib, Willy Belle, Rone, Jonathan Wilson, Superpoze, Yan Wagner, Cashmere Cat, Interzone Extended, Startijenn & El Taqa, Cansione / Grenanico, Fest-noz
- Sunday, July 21: Phoenix, Carlos Santana, Marc Lavoine, Lou Doillon, The Vaccines, Alt-J (∆), Charles Bradley, Mermonte, Busy P / Ed Banger Megamix, Mesparrow, La Femme, Marie-Pierre Arthur, Skip&Die, La Gale, Barzaz, La Mal Coiffée, Turbo Sans Visa, Jack Danielle's String Band28,29.
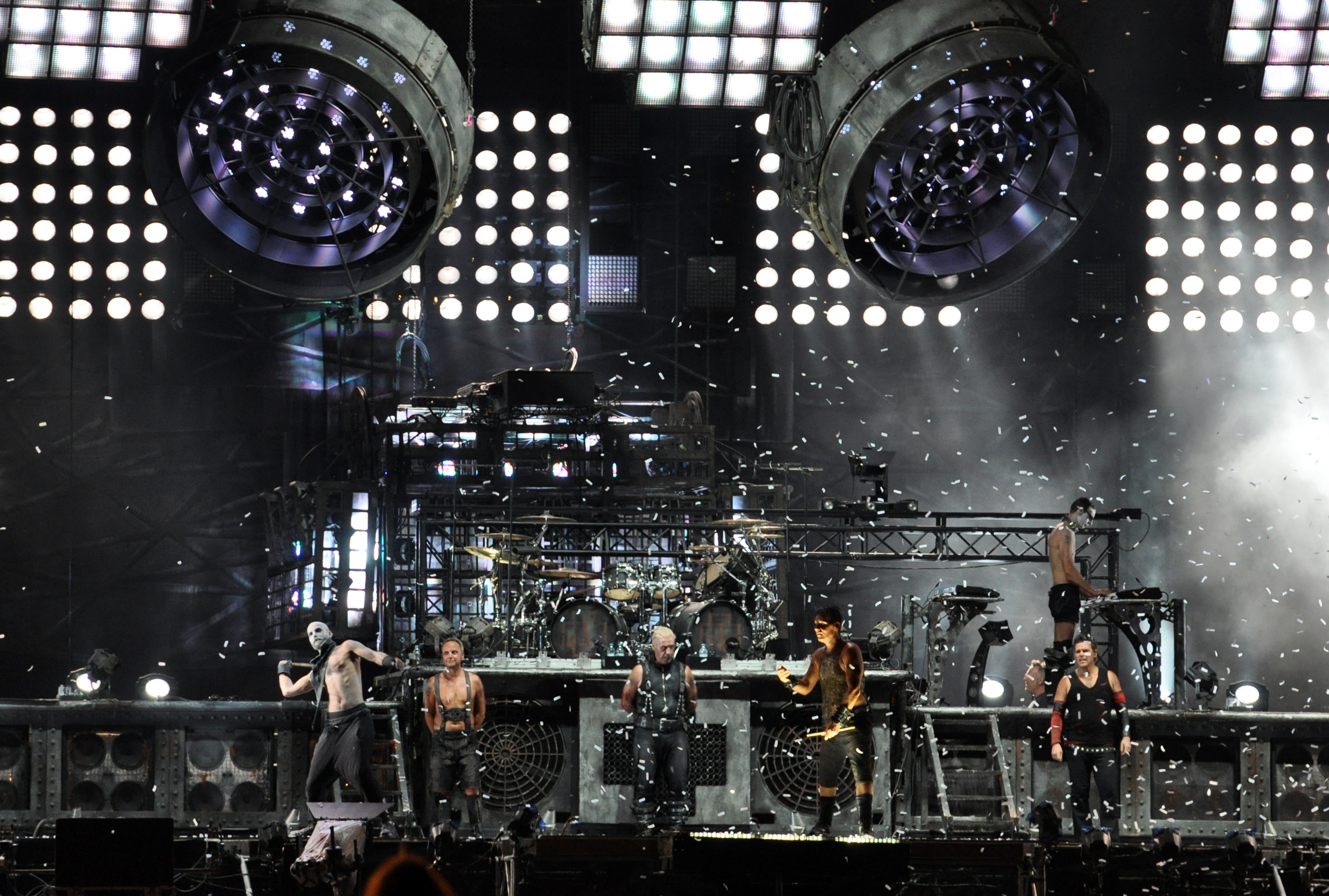
Rammstein

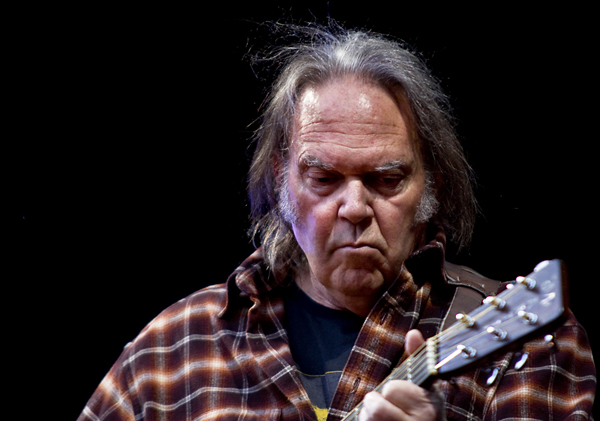
Neil Young

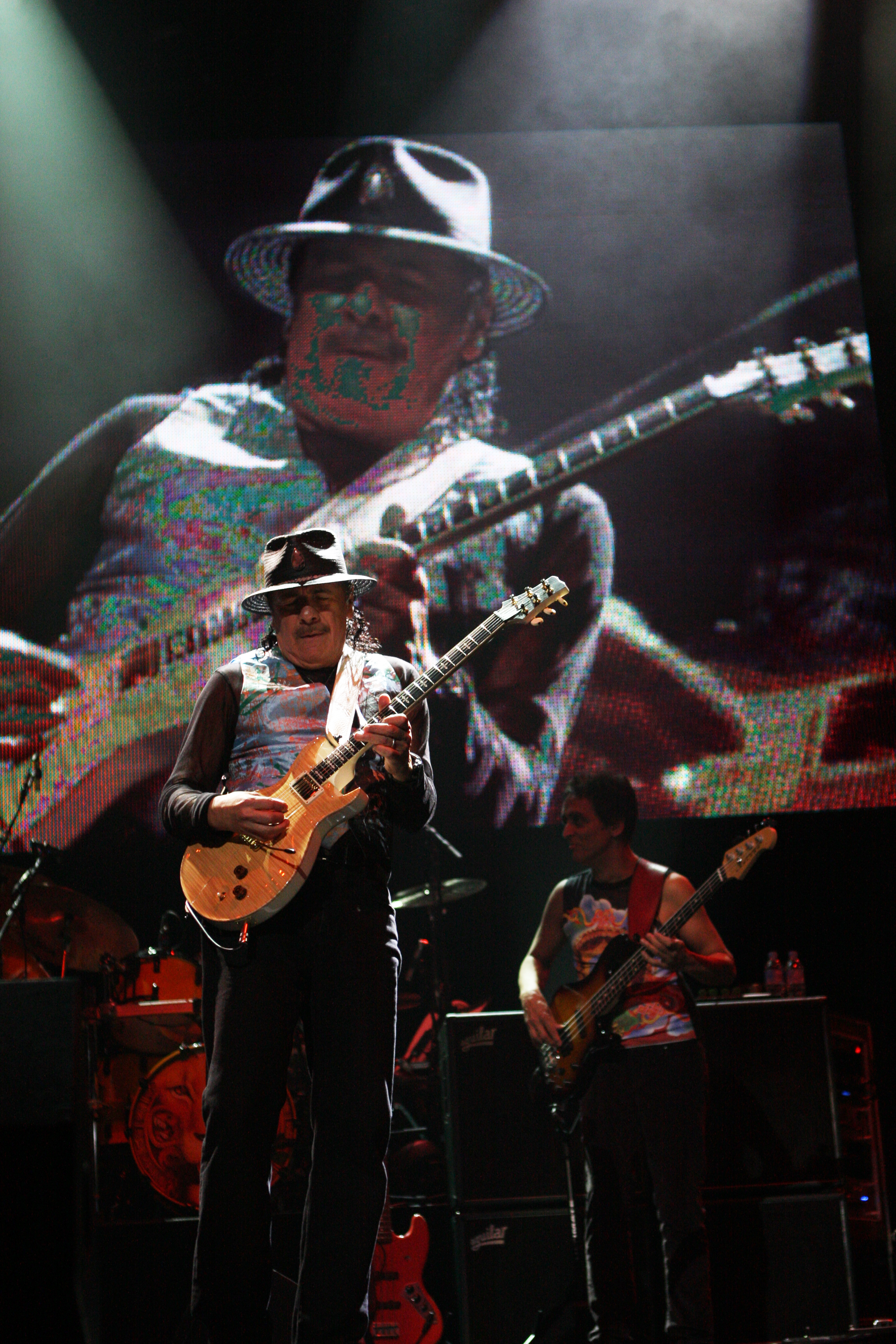
Carlos Santana

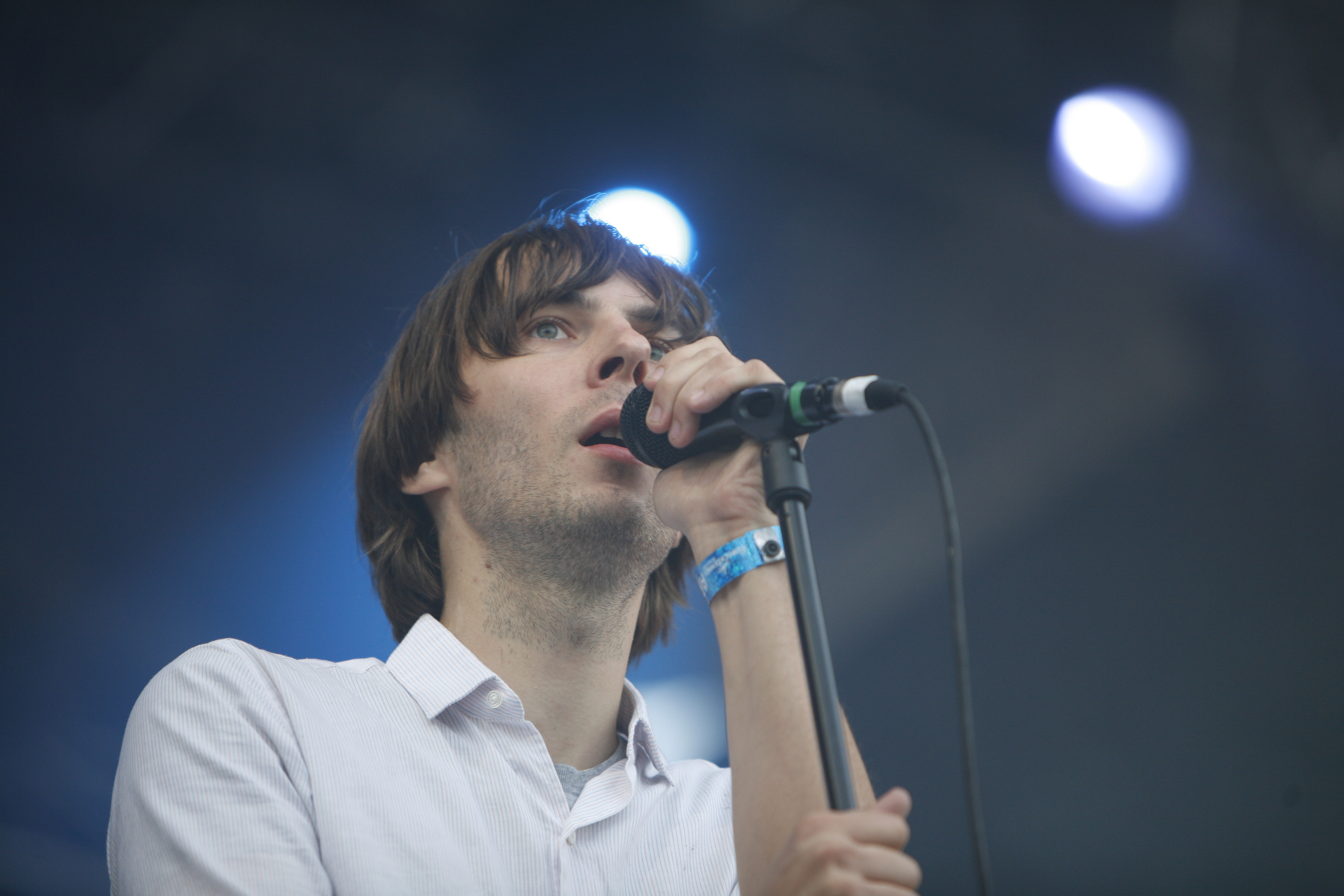
Phoenix

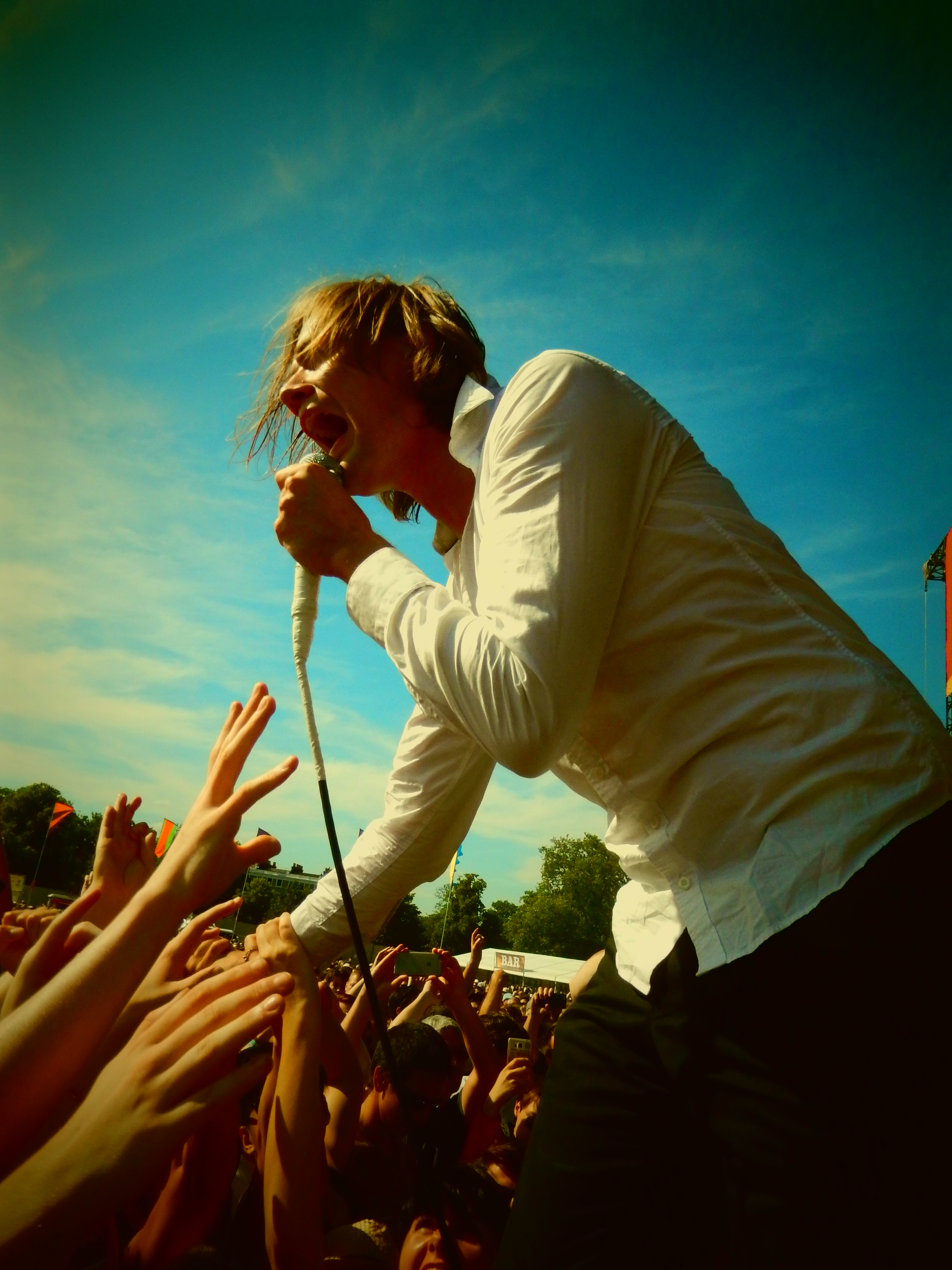
The Hives

=== 2012 ===
- Thursday: Portishead, LMFAO, Zebda, Rover, Keziah Jones, Django Django, Don Rimini, Stuck in the Sound, Beat Assailant, Breakbot, La Rumeur, Baadman, Im Takt
- Friday: The Cure, Martin Solveig, Thomas Dutronc, Metronomy, Brigitte, Hollie Cook, Bloc Party, M83, Youssoupha, Other Lives, Baxter Dury, Triggerfinger, El Hijo de la Cumbia, Danyèl Waro, Soïg Sibéril, Rich Aucoin, Sin Antesia, Colin
- Saturday: Sting, Justice, Hubert-Félix Thiéfaine, Irma, Selah Sue, C2C, Busy P(cancelled and replaced by DVNO), The Rapture, Rodrigo y Gabriela & C.U.B.A., Kiril Djaikowski (+ guests), Sallie Ford & The Sound Outside, Kanka, Balthazar, Christine, Badume's Band, Selamnesh Zemene, Blue & Black Zebra, Bobby & Sue, le dernier championnat de Air Biniou, fest-noz (with Yann-Fañch Kemener/Menneteau, Vincendeau/Felder, Boulanger/Simon, Termajik)
- Sunday: Bob Dylan, Gossip, Cœur de Pirate (cancelled), Chinese Man, Garbage, Orelsan, 1995, L'Ensemble Matheus, Kasabian, Amadou & Mariam, Santigold, Jesus Christ Fashion Barbe, Avishaï Cohen, Dope D.O.D., Zara Moussa, Random Recipe, Ar Rannou, Burek, Taol Lans

=== 2011 ===
- Thursday, July 14: Scorpions, Snoop Dogg, Ar Re Yaouank, Kaiser Chiefs, Mondkopf, Yelle, Orchestre national de Barbès, Pulp, Olivia Ruiz, Jean-Louis Aubert, Adam Kesher, The Hyènes, Shaka Ponk, Julien Tiné, Le Grand Orchestre Armorigène, Stand High Patrol, Titi Robin Trio, Tremplin Taol Lans, La Canaille.
- Friday, July 15: Eddy Mitchell, David Guetta, M.I.A., The BellRays, Jack Johnson, Soprano, Foals, Cold War Kids, The Inspector Cluzo, Stromae, The Octopus, Systema Solar, Barrington Levy, DJ Elwood, Who Knew, Lo Cor De La Plana, Siam, Sylvain Giro, Electric Bazar, Savaty.
- Saturday, July 16: Cypress Hill, Supertramp, Angus & Julia Stone, The Bloody Beetroots, Yannick Noah, Two Door Cinema Club, AaRON, Zebra & Le Bagad Carhaix, The Shoes, Tiga, Gildas Kitsune, Nasser, Crystal Fighters, Family of the Year, Misteur Valaire, Ibrahim Maalouf, Olli & Mood, Championnat du Monde d'Air Biniou, Kreiz Breizh Akademy 3, Savaty Orchestra, Fest Noz.
- Sunday, July 17: Lou Reed, The Chemical Brothers, Pierre Perret, PJ Harvey, Asaf Avidan & The Mojos, House of Pain, Ben L'Oncle Soul, Boogers, Congotronics vs Rockers, Goran Bregović, Gaetano Fabri, Nadara, Balkan Beat Box, DJ Tagada, Vojasa, Sondorgo feat Naat Veliov, Ladylike Lily, Marchand vs Burger, Leif Vollebekk, Duoud, Savaty Orchestra, Krismenn.

=== 2010 ===
July 15–18:

- Thursday, July 15: Muse, Jacques Dutronc, Mr Oizo, Revolver, The Raveonettes.
- Friday, July 16: Chapelier Fou, Mika, Supreme NTM, Diam's, Vitalic, Sophie Hunger, Airbourne, The Black Box Revelation, Wovenhand, I Arkle, Baroness, Tagada Jones, The Incredible Punish Yourself Picture Show, Lyse, DJ Kemicalkem, Noïd.
- Saturday, July 17: Indochine, Phoenix, Boys Noize, Gojira, Féfé, Gaëtan Roussel, FM Belfast, Midlake, Fanfarlo, Sexy Sushi, Fortune, dan le sac vs Scroobius Pip, DJ Kentaro.
- Sunday, July 18: Jamiroquai, -M-, Alain Souchon, Julian Casablancas, Etienne de Crecy, Pony Pony Run Run, Toots & the Maytals, Gush, Raggasonic, Bost & Bim, Bitty Mclean, Soul Stereo, Lord Zeljko, Contreo & l'Orchestre de Bretagne.

=== 2009 ===
Third edition of the spring festival "Les Vieilles Charrues remettent le son" (the Old Plows turn the sound back on), on 13 and 14 March:

- Friday: La Chanson du Dimanche, Zaza Fournier, Guillaume Cantillon
- Saturday: Les Ramoneurs de Menhirs, Craftmen Club, Mister Alone

In 2009, the summer festival hosted:

- Thursday, July 16: Bruce Springsteen "The Boss" and The E Street Band, The Killers, Fiction Plane, Priscilla Ahn
- Friday, July 17: Lenny Kravitz, Bénabar, Nneka, Birdy Nam Nam, TV on the Radio, Micronologie, Montgomery, The Jim Jones Revue, Alela Diane, Joseph Arthur, Alamo Race Track, Olle Nyman
- Saturday, July 18: Charlie Winston, Renan Luce, Les Tambours du Bronx, Ghinzu, La Rue Kétanou, Cocoon, Izia, Coming Soon, Nashville Pussy, Naïve New Beaters, The Driver (aka Manu le Malin), Surkin, Metronomy, Big Fest Noz, Championnat du monde d'Air Biniou
- Sunday, July 19: Moby, Francis Cabrel, 2 Many DJ's, Julien Doré, Coming Soon, Alborosie, The Ting Tings, Baba Salah, Les Tambours du Bronx, L'Angle Mort (Zone Libre VS Casey & Hamé), Serge Teyssot-Gay, Yo Majesty, Ministère des Affaires populaires

=== 2008 ===
Second edition of the spring festival "Les Vieilles Charrues Remettent le Son":

- Saturday, March 1: La Rumeur, L'Épopée
- Friday, March 7: La Grande Sophie, Maion & Wenn, Wine
- Saturday, March 8: Déportivo, Sna-Fu, Hifiklub

For the 17th Festival (July 17–20) the program was:

- Thursday, July 17: Ben Harper & the Innocent Criminals, Motörhead, Babyshambles, BB Brunes
- Friday, July 18: ZZ Top, Christophe Maé, Yael Naïm, Gogol Bordello, AaRON, Calvin Harris, Ben's Brother, Patrick Watson, Senser, Constance Verluca, Sharko
- Saturday, July 19: Etienne Daho, The Gossip, Matmatah, Gad Elmaleh, Camille, Yelle, Duffy, Zebramix, The Go! Team, Dub Incorporation, Simian Mobile Disco, Brisa Roché, Crystal Castles, Does It Offend You, Yeah?, SebastiAn ...
- Sunday, July 20: Vanessa Paradis, The Hives, The Kooks, The Dø, Aṣa, Thomas Dutronc, The Wedding Present (replacing The Wombats), Psy 4 de la Rime, Wax Tailor, Foreign Beggars, Morcheeba

=== 2007 ===
For the first time, a spring festival was held in March: Les Vieilles Charrues Remettent le Son:

- Friday, March 9: Miossec, Constance Verluca
- Saturday, March 10: Renan Luce, Brisa Roché, Babet, John Lord Fonda, Yelle, datA, Débruit.
- Sunday, March 11: Mayra Andrade, Ozan Trio

In 2007 the summer festival lasted 4 days. July 19–22:

- Thursday, July 19: Charles Aznavour, Les Rita Mitsouko, Sanseverino, Philippe Katerine
- Friday, July 20: Peter Gabriel, Arcade Fire, Jacques Higelin, Kaolin, Ayọ, Fabulous Trobadors, LCD Soundsystem, Clap Your Hands Say Yeah, Donavon Frankenreiter, Art Brut, DJ Zebra, Stuck in the Sound, Nelson, Fancy, Lugo, Christel Vars, Les Vedettes
- Saturday, July 21: Bryan Ferry, Tryo, Salvatore Adamo, Kaiser Chiefs (canceled), Emilie Simon, JoeyStarr, Gentleman & The Far East band, Sean Lennon, Justice, Herman Düne, Para One, Goose, Galaxie, DJ Funk, Tékel, Dr Vince, Mr Maqs, Daniel Hélin, Thomas VDB
- Sunday, July 22: Yannick Noah, Scissor Sisters (canceled), Kasabian, Grand Corps Malade, Groundation, Rickie Lee Jones, Abd Al Malik, Raul Paz, Keny Arkana, Emily Loizeau, Oxmo Puccino & The Jazzbastards, Beat Assailant, Interzone, Thomas VDB

=== 2006 ===
Fifteenth year anniversary for the Festival, July 20–23:

- Thursday, July 20: Johnny Hallyday, Mauss, Les Têtes Raides
- Friday, July 21: Placebo, Raphael, Rhesus, !!!, Yann Tiersen, dEUS, FDB, Shout Out Louds, Diam's, 113, K'Naan, Soig Siberil, Abstrackt Keal Agram, Didier Super
- Saturday, July 22: Madness, Cali, Jamel Debbouze, Babylon Circus, Les Cowboys Fringants, Editors, HushPuppies, Orange Blossom, Lords of Altamont, Besh o droM, DJ Champion, Karkwan Plaster, Ghislain Poirier, Fest-noz
- Sunday, July 23: Pixies, Tracy Chapman, Julien Clerc, Dionysos, Da Silva, Bumcello, Rodolphe Burger, Meteor Show Extended VOL 2, Olivia Ruiz, Infadels, Winston McAnuff & the Bazbaz Orchestra, Soulwax Nite Version, Erol Alkan, 2 Many DJs, Digitalism

=== 2005 ===
July 22–24:

- Friday: Deep Purple, New Order, Buena Vista Social Club presents Ibrahim Ferrer, LCD Soundsystem, Ba Cissoko, Luke, Jane Birkin, Jeanne Cherhal, Sheer K, Ghinzu, An Pierlé, Hollywood Porn Stars, Dj Morpheus, Soldout
- Saturday: Iggy and The Stooges, Mickey 3D, Ridan, Amadou et Mariam, The Sunday Drivers, Louis Bertignac, Jamie Cullum, Devendra Banhart, The Kills, Laetitia Shériff, Vitalic, Swayzak, La Phaze, Nils Petter Molvaer, Missill
- Sunday: Franz Ferdinand, Bernard Lavilliers, Tiken Jah Fakoly, Laurent Garnier, Tinariwen, Blues Explosion, Michel Delpech, Rachid Taha, Nosfell, Florent Marchet, Kool Shen, TTC, Busdriver, Goldie Lookin' Chain, Psykick Lyrikah

=== 2004 ===
July 23–25:

- Friday: Rokia Traoré, The Coral, Texas, The Divine Comedy, Pleymo, Starsailor, Alain Bashung, Ralph Myerz, Little Axe, Junior Delgado, Adrian Sherwood, New Paulette Orchestra, Fabulous Trobadors, Iration Sleepers
- Saturday: Tété, Paul Personne, Patti Smith, -M-, The Streets, A.S. Dragon, Jim Murple Memorial, Cali, Girls in Hawaii, Blood & Burger, Erik Truffaz, Emilie Simon, Abstrackt Keal Agram, X-Makeena
- Sunday: Lhasa, Thomas Fersen, IAM, Muse, Freestylers, Sonic Machine, Hugues Aufray, Ilene Barnes, Kings of Leon, Horace Andy, Clotaire K, Svinkels, Buck 65, La Rumeur

=== 2003 ===
July 14, 18–20:

- Friday: Salif Keïta, Pretenders, Renaud, Arno, Röyksopp, Hocus Pocus, Enrico Macias, Israel Vibration, Flogging Molly, High Tone, Interlope, Stupeflip, Monsieur Orange, EZ3kiel
- Saturday: Nada Surf, Carlos Núñez, Zazie, Tricky, Gotan Project, Arthur H, Massilia Sound System, Les Wampas, Mickey 3D, Le Peuple de l'Herbe, The Herbaliser, Hexstatic, Amon Tobin, DJ Vadim & Russian Percussions
- Sunday: 22 Pistepirkko, Laurent Voulzy, Bénabar, Supergrass, R.E.M., Ceux qui marchent debout, Karin Clercq, Bikini Machine, Rodolphe Burger, Calexico, Ganga, Tony Allen, DJ Maüs, Gnawa Njoum Experience

=== 2002 ===
July 14, 19–21:

- Friday: Cheb Mami, Les Rita Mitsouko, Spook & the Guay, Joseph Arthur, Paris Combo, De la Soul, Patrice, Gonzales
- Saturday: Louis Chedid with an appearance of Matthieu Chedid, Miossec, Asian Dub Foundation, The Cure, Les Caméléons, Dionysos, Tiken Jah Fakoly, Dominique A, Hawksley Workman, Llorca, The Youngsters, Aqua Bassino, Frédéric Galliano & The African Divas
- Sunday: Sanseverino, Yann Tiersen, Gérald De Palmas, Iggy Pop, Youssou N'Dour, Susheela Raman, Brigitte Fontaine, Sergent Garcia, Marianne Faithfull, US3, Dreadzone, Bauchklang, DJ Seb the Player, Greg Dread

=== 2001 ===
July 14, 20–22:

- Friday: Black Uhuru feat Sly & Robbie, Henri Salvador, Ben Harper, Denez Prigent, Brooklyn Funk Essentials, Mickey 3D, Hooverphonic, Georges Moustaki, Arno, Le Peuple de l'Herbe
- Saturday: Java, Claude Nougaro, Têtes Raides, Noir Désir, Saint Germain, Gnawa Diffusion, K2R Riddim, Klaktonclown, Zenzile, Rubin Steiner
- Sunday: Kat Onoma, Matmatah, Placebo, Manu Chao, Gilles Servat, Occidentale de Fanfare, Maceo Parker, Ska-P, Vanessa Paradis, Dupain

=== 2000 ===
July 14, 21–23:

- Friday: The Cranberries, William Sheller, Alan Stivell, La Ruda Salska, Saïan Supa Crew, Silmarils, Gomez, Emir Kusturica & The No Smoking Orchestra, Raspigaous, Hilight Tribe
- Saturday: Joe Cocker, Louise Attaque, -M-, 16 Horsepower, Mass Hysteria, Day One, Marcel et son Orchestre, Percubaba, Rinôçérôse, Siméon Lenoir
- Sunday: Beck, Eddy Mitchell, Joan Baez, Asian Dub Foundation, Muse, The Skatalites, Femi Kuti, U Roy, Sergent Garcia, Les Goristes

=== 1999 ===
July 13–18:

- Tuesday: Rasta Bigoud, Gilles Servat & Bagad Locoal Mendon, Hastan
- Wednesday: Armens, Orchestre national de Barbès
- Thursday: Faudel, Dolly, Cornu, Freedom for King Kong, Pat O'May, François Audrain, Karma, Menestra
- Friday: Massive Attack, Hubert-Félix Thiéfaine, Matmatah, Death in Vegas, Yann Tiersen, Mangu, Soïg Sibéril, Beth, Sloy, Pevar Den, Mister Gang
- Saturday: Stephan Eicher, Eagle Eye Cherry, Véronique Sanson, Tryo, Denez Prigent, Andre Williams & The Countdowns, Érik Marchand & Le Taraf de Caransebes, Arkan
- Sunday: Pierre Perret, Ben Harper & The Innocent Criminals, Jacques Higelin, Burning Spear, Sinsemilia, Cesária Évora, Ensemble Matheus, Rachid Taha, Annie Ebrel - Riccardo Del Fra, The Little Rabbits, Filaj

=== 1998 ===
July 17–19:

- Friday: MC Solaar, Jean-Louis Aubert, The Wailers, Natacha Atlas, Matmatah, Khamelean, Bambi Cruz.
- Saturday: Charles Trenet, Louise Attaque, Johnny Clegg & Bagad Kemper, The Gladiators, Zebda and Red Cardell.
- Sunday: Iggy Pop, Bernard Lavilliers, Shane MacGowan & The Popes, Yuri Buenaventura, Pigalle, Trio Roland Becker, FAB, Didier Squiban, Tyour Gnawa.

=== 1997 ===
July 4–6:

- Friday: Jane Birkin, Nada Surf, Miossec, Blankass, Kent.
- Saturday: Simple Minds, Linton Kwesi Johnson, Bagadou du Tonnerre, Marousse, Bates Motel.
- Sunday: James Brown, Claude Nougaro, Diaouled ar Menez, Doo the Doo, Spontus.

=== 1996 ===
July 5–7:

Miossec, Bernard Lavilliers, Zebda, Les Innocents, Maxime Le Forestier, Frank Black, Ouf La Puce ..., Marcel et Son Orchestre, Red Cardell, Tayfa, Boulequies et Sonotones, Ar re Yaouank, Gwenc'hlan, Oxyde de Cuivre, The Guilt.

=== 1995 ===
July 7–9, First Edition in Carhaix:

Blues Brothers, The Silencers, Red Cardell, Ar Re Yaounak, Spook & the Guay, Soul Cactus, Taraf de Haïdouks Junior, Carré Manchot, A Bout de Souffle, Ongi Etorri, Mike Hutchison, Namas Pamos.

=== 1994 ===
Held at Landeleau (July 5):

Les Satellites, Dolly, Oy Ventilo, Les Raouls j’te Pousse, Scotch Snap, La Folyre.

=== 1993 ===
Landeleau (Saturday 10):

Les Pires, Oy Ventilo, La Folyre, Soft Touch Band, Students Brass Band and B12.

=== 1992 ===
Creation of fête des Vieilles Charrues as a small village event in Landeleau. No concert poster nor list available.

== Stages of the festival ==
=== Glenmor ===
Glenmor stage is the biggest stage of the festival. It is named after Emile Le Scanff, also known as Glenmor. With a total surface area of 1,000 m², Glenmor stage is one of the largest French stages.

As every other stage of the festival, Glenmor stage is set up before each occasion of the festival, and taken down after the end of the concerts.

=== Kerouac ===
Kerouac stage is the second stage of the festival. It is named after Jack Kerouac, whose ancestors were from Brittany.

=== Grall ===
Grall stage is the third stage of the festival and is named after Xavier Grall. Hip-hop and electronic music artists often play on this stage.

=== Gwernig ===
The smallest stage of the festival, Gwernig, is located under a circus tent. It is named after the Breton-American poet Youenn Gwernig who lived in USA. Concerts on Gwernig stage are traditionally held by Breton music and world music bands.
