= Eurockéennes =

French rock music festival in Belfort

The Eurockéennes de Belfort (French pronunciation: [øʁɔkeɛn də bɛlfɔʁ]; English: Eurockeans of Belfort) is one of France's largest rock music festivals. The Eurockéennes, a play on words involving rock (rock music) and européennes (Europeans), is a festival based in a nature reserve beside Lac de Malsaucy in Sermamagny.

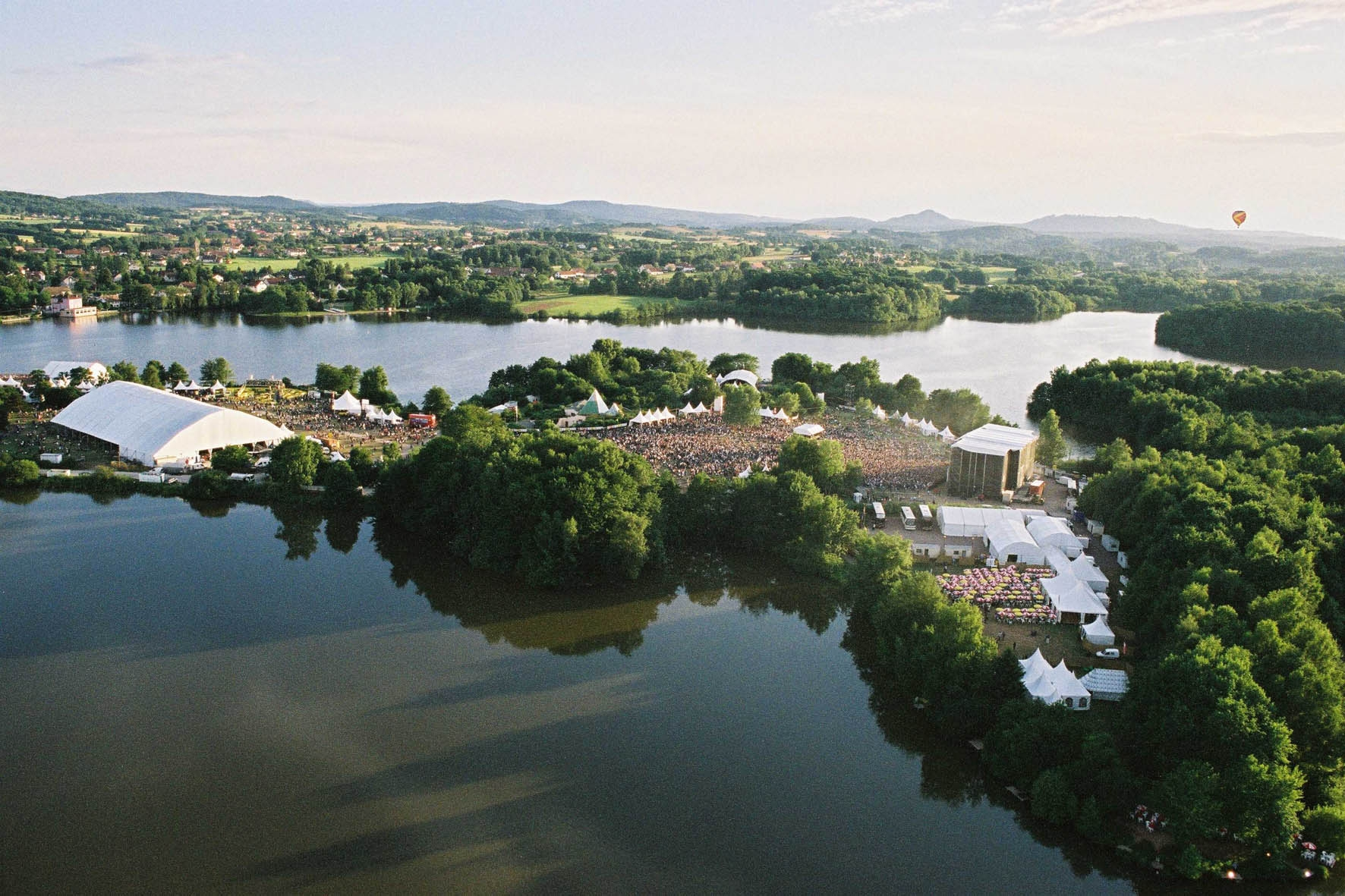
Eurockéennes festival at the Malsaucy site

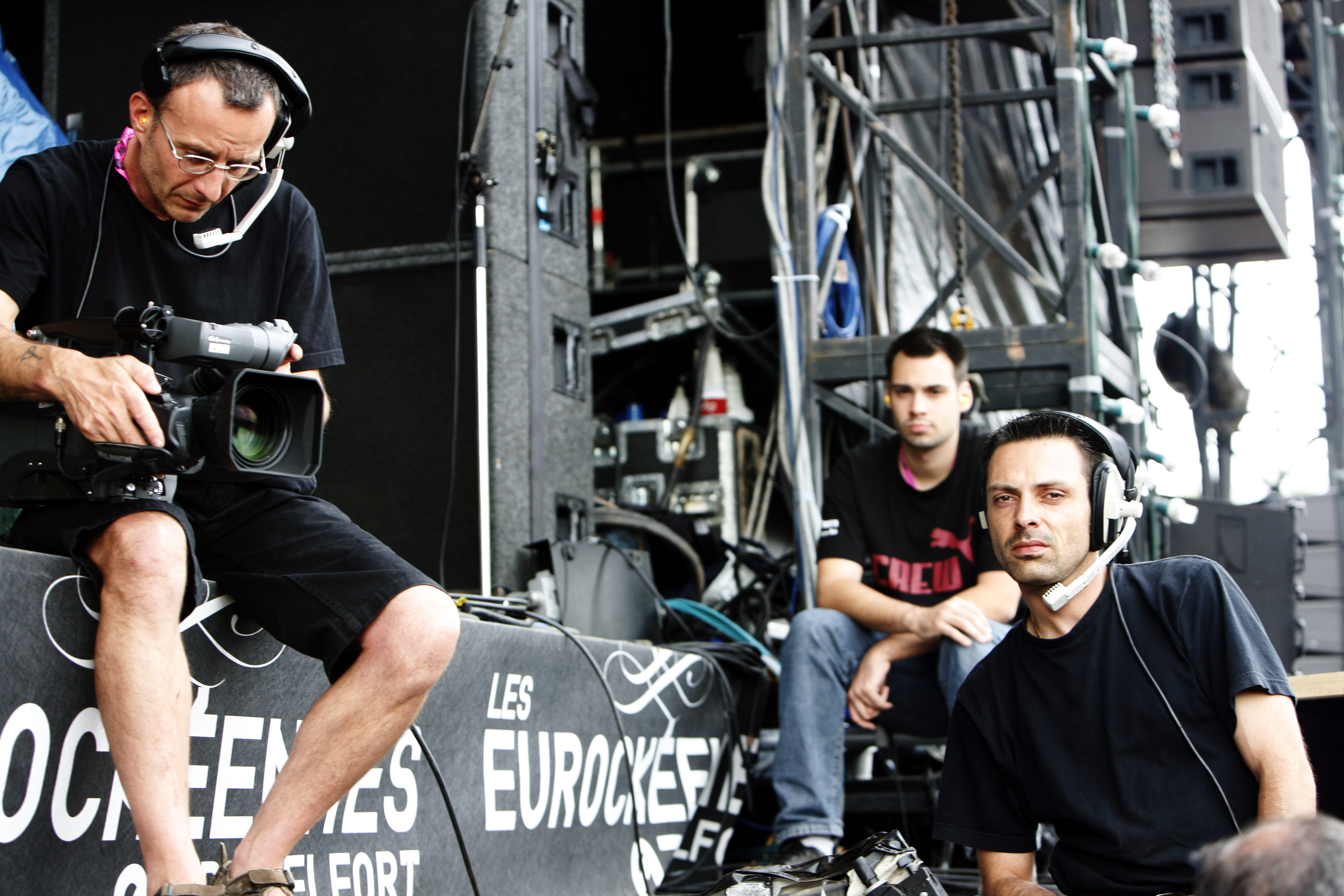

== About ==
=== History ===
1989 marked the first time round for the festival, when it went under the name Le Ballon - Territoire de musiques, named after the nearby Ballon d'Alsace. The festival was organised to take place on the Ballon d'Alsace, but the peninsula on the Malsaucy lake was chosen in the end, because it was easier to link by car, bus and even train. It was the brainchild of the Conseil général of the Territoire de Belfort, who wanted to dynamise their département with a big cultural event for its youths.

In 1990 the festival was renamed les Eurockéennes de Belfort.

Attendance:

- 10,000 in 1989
- 70,000 in 1993
- 80,000 in 2002
- 95,000 in 2004
- 100,000 in 2006
- 100,000 in 2008
- 127,000 in 2013 (on 4 days)
- 102,000 in 2015
- 130,000 in 2017
- 135,000 in 2018

Les Eurockéennes takes place on the peninsula of Lake Malsaucy, 10 kilometres from Belfort. A number of different stages are present – la Grande Scène, le Chapiteau, la Loggia and la Plage. Most of the time there are simultaneous concerts on different stages; altogether in 2005 there were about 70.

A campsite, 3 km from the main site, is the free and temporary home to 15000 festival-goers, with a free shuttle bus running between the campsite and the entrance to the main area.

=== 2020 and 2021 editions and COVID-19 pandemic ===
It was announced on 13 April 2020 that the 2020 edition would be cancelled because of the ongoing COVID-19 pandemic.

Eurockeennes 2021 was cancelled as well.

=== Les tremplins ===
Tremplins (stepping stones) are organised to allow youth groups to get to know one another. These are organised in Alsace, Bourgogne, Franche-Comté (Doubs, Jura, Haute-Saône and Territoire de Belfort), Lorraine, Germany and Switzerland.

== Billing ==
=== 2014 ===
- The Black Keys

=== 2012 ===
- 1995
- Alabama Shakes
- Amadou et Mariam featuring Bertrand Cantat
- Art District
- Busy P
- C2C
- Carbon Airways
- Cerebrall Ballzy
- Charlie Winston
- Chinese Man
- Christine
- Cie Transe Express
- Cypress Hill
- Die Antwoord
- Dionysos
- Django Django
- Dope D.O.D
- Dropkick Murphys
- Electric Guest
- Factory Floor
- Frànçois and The Atlas Mountains
- Gentleman
- Hank Williams III
- Hanni El Khatib
- Hathors
- Hollie Cook
- Hubert-Félix Thiéfaine
- Jack White
- Jesus Christ Fashion Barbe
- Justice
- Kavinsky
- Kindness
- Lana Del Rey
- Le Comte de Bouderbala
- Los Disidentes Del Sucio Motel
- Marie Madeleine
- Mastodon
- Miike Snow
- Miles Kane
- Murkage
- Näo
- Orelsan
- Poliça
- Refused
- Reggie Watts
- Sahab Koanda & Le Kokondo Zaz
- Sallie Ford & The Sound Outside
- Sebastian
- Set & Match
- Sgt Pokes
- Shaka Ponk
- Skream And Benga
- The Brian Jonestown Massacre
- The Buttshakers
- The Cure
- Thee Oh Sees
- The Kooks
- The Mars Volta
- Wiz Khalifa

=== 2011 ===
- Aaron
- And So I Watch You From Afar
- Anna Calvi
- Arcade Fire
- Arctic Monkeys
- Atari Teenage Riot
- Battles
- Beady Eye
- Beth Ditto
- Binary Audio Misfits
- Birdy Nam Nam
- Boys Noize
- Carte Blanche
- Cheers
- Crystal Castles
- Drums Are For Parades
- Funeral Party
- Gaëtan Roussel
- Hit By Moscow
- Honey For Petzi
- House of Pain
- Karkwa
- Katerine & New Burlesque
- Keziah Jones
- King Automatic
- Kyuss Lives!
- Les Hurlements d'Léo
- Les Savy Fav
- Mars Red Sky
- Medi
- Metronomy
- Mona
- Moriarty
- Motörhead
- Nasser
- Odd Future
- Padwriterz
- Paul Kalkbrenner
- Queens of the Stone Age
- Raphael Saadiq
- Staff Benda Bilili
- Stromae
- The Dø
- The Electric Suicide Club
- The Shoes
- The Ting Tings
- Tiken Jah Fakoly
- True Live
- Tryo
- Ullmann Kararocke
- Wu Lyf

=== 2010 ===
- Jay-Z
- LCD Soundsystem
- the xx
- The Hives
- Memphis Bleek
- The Black Keys
- The Specials
- Julian Casablancas
- The Dead Weather
- Missy Elliott
- Mika
- Fuck Buttons
- Chromeo
- Foals
- Gallows
- Hot Chip
- Health
- Broken Social Scene
- The Drums
- Bomba Estereo
- Charlotte Gainsbourg
- Vitalic
- Martina Topley-Bird
- Memory Tapes
- Massive Attack
- Patrick Watson
- Kasabian
- Airbourne
- Janelle Monáe
- Empire of the Sun
- Two Door Cinema Club
- Afrodizz
- The Bloody Beetroots
- Woven Hand
- BB Brunes
- Beast
- Omar Souleyman
- Suicidal Tendencies
- Infectious Grooves
- The Middle East

=== 2009 ===
- The Prodigy
- The Kills
- Mos Def
- Yeah Yeah Yeahs
- Cypress Hill
- Florence and the Machine
- Friendly Fires
- Emiliana Torrini
- King Khan and the Shrines
- Kanye West
- Peter Bjorn & John
- Kap Bambino
- Diplo
- Monotonix
- Friendly Fires
- La Roux
- Laurent Garnier
- Alela Diane
- Slipknot
- Rolo Tomassi
- Passion Pit
- Chapelier Fou
- Phoenix
- Peter Doherty
- Airbourne
- Sleepy Sun
- Noisettes
- Gojira
- Dananananaykroyd
- Crookers
- Olivia Ruiz
- Naïve New Beaters
- Tricky
- The Temper Trap

=== 2008 ===
- Cat Power
- N*E*R*D
- Babyshambles
- Vampire Weekend
- The Offspring
- The Mondrians
- CSS
- Sebastien Tellier
- MGMT
- Santogold
- Moby
- Seasick Steve
- Calvin Harris
- Massive Attack
- Biffy Clyro
- Gnarls Barkley
- dan Le Sac vs Scroobius Pip
- Lykke Li
- Soko
- The Gossip
- Yeasayer
- Girl Talk
- Battles
- Ben Harper
- Holy Fuck
- Comets on Fire
- Grinderman
- The Wombats
- Camille
- The Dø
- Cavalera Conspiracy
- dEUS
- The Blakes

=== 2007 ===
- Arcade Fire
- Wu-Tang Clan
- TV on the Radio
- Digitalism
- Queens of the Stone Age
- Cold War Kids
- I'm From Barcelona
- Deerhoof
- Marilyn Manson
- Juliette and the Licks
- Les Rita Mitsouko
- Klaxons
- Amy Winehouse
- Maxïmo Park
- Air
- 65daysofstatic
- Justice
- Gogol Bordello
- Young Gods
- Bonde Do Role
- Editors
- Clipse
- Converge
- Peter Von Poehl
- Archie Bronson Outfit
- Punish Yourself
- Junior Senior
- Simian Mobile Disco
- The Good, the Bad & the Queen
- Bitty McLean

=== 2006 ===
- Depeche Mode
- Morrissey
- Daft Punk
- Deftones
- The Strokes
- Animal Collective
- Arctic Monkeys
- Damian Marley
- The Young Knives
- Muse
- Sigur Rós
- Archive
- Blackalicious
- Mogwai
- Dominique A
- Art Brut
- Gossip
- Two Gallants
- Uffie
- Gojira
- Anaïs
- Atmosphere
- Nonstop
- Polysics
- Poni Hoax
- Malajube
- Fancy
- Coldcut
- Infadels
- Philippe Katerine
- Spank Rock
- Apsci
- La Caution
- Spleen
- Nathan Fake
- Fat Freddys Drop
- Cult of Luna
- Islands
- Les Georges Leningrad
- We Are Wolves
- Ghislain Poirier
- Omnikrom
- Duchess Says
- Aberfeldy
- Giant Drag

=== 2005 ===
- Bloc Party
- Sonic Youth
- Interpol
- Bright Eyes
- The Chemical Brothers
- CocoRosie
- Eagles of Death Metal
- Electrelane
- The Killers
- Kraftwerk
- Le Tigre
- Common
- Émilie Simon
- The Go! Team
- Röyksopp
- Slum Village
- Jamie Lidell
- Raphael Saadiq
- Vitalic
- Andrew Bird
- Amon Tobin
- Balkan Beat Box
- Jean Grae
- Tom Ze
- Blumen
- Kaizers Orchestra
- Ken Boothe
- Konono Nº1
- Little Barrie
- Nine Inch Nails
- Queens of the Stone Age
- Saul Williams
- T. Raumschmiere
- Amadou & Mariam
- Bonnie 'Prince' Billy
- Cake
- Cali
- Dälek
- Eths
- Garbage
- Ghinzu
- KaS Product
- Mastodon
- Moodymann
- Morgan Heritage
- The National
- Tom Vek

=== 2004 ===
- PJ Harvey
- Pixies
- TV on the Radio
- Belle and Sebastian
- Slipknot
- The Rapture
- Groove Armada
- Blonde Redhead
- Zero7
- KoЯn
- Ben Kweller
- !!!
- Placebo
- An Albatross
- Scissor Sisters
- Luke
- No One Is Innocent
- Two Tone Club
- JR Ewing
- IAM
- Broken Social Scene
- Franz Ferdinand
- Matthieu Chedid
- Lyrics Born
- Lifesavas
- Capleton
- Antibalas Afrobeat Orchestra
- Mono
- A.S Dragon
- Herman Düne & Invites
- Daniel Darc
- Seeed
- Buck 65 and Band
- Youngblood Brass Band
- Alain Bashung
- RJD2
- Sludgefeast
- The Perceptionists
- Agoria
- X-Vision
- The Cat Empire
- Amp Fiddler
- The Dillinger Escape Plan
- Lust
- High Tone

=== 2003 ===
- Toots & the Maytals
- Radiohead
- The Rapture
- The Roots
- Peaches
- LCD Soundsystem
- The Streets
- Dave Gahan (in Depeche Mode)
- Goldfrapp
- Slayer
- 2 Many Djs
- Nada Surf
- Underworld
- Massive Attack
- The Melvins
- Electric Six
- Death in Vegas
- Suicide
- The Datsuns
- Mickey 3D
- Stone Sour
- Console
- Nostromo
- Arto Lindsay
- Les Wampas
- Ellen Allien
- Mike Ladd
- Hexstatic
- AqME
- Hell Is for Heroes
- Tokyo Ska Paradise Orchestra
- La Rumeur
- Dionysos
- Tom McRae
- Tricky
- I Monster
- Fat Truckers
- Eiffel
- The Polyphonic Spree
- Zebda
- Tony Allen
- Jaga Jazzist
- Watcha
- Blackalicious
- Asian Dub Foundation
- Tomahawk

=== 2002 ===
- Muse
- Vitalic
- N*E*R*D
- Rival Schools
- The Chemical Brothers
- Travis
- The Notwist
- Antipop Consortium
- Buju Banton
- Pleymo
- Bulle
- The (International) Noise Conspiracy
- Sinclair
- New Bomb Turks
- Saïan Supa Crew
- The Bellrays
- Noir Désir
- Bilal
- Archive
- Soulfly
- Meï Teï Shô
- High Tone
- Alec Empire
- A
- Aston Villa
- Tarmac
- Ska-P
- Watcha
- Gomez
- Lofofora + invités
- Air
- Miro
- Burning Heads
- Hawksley Workman
- Michael Franti & Spearhead
- Trio Mocoto
- Sizzla
- Sainkho Namtchylak
- Rammstein
- Gotan Project

=== 2001 ===
- Iggy Pop
- Ben Harper
- Incubus
- Matmatah
- Yann Tiersen
- La Ruda Salska
- Tété
- Têtes Raides
- K's Choice
- Disiz la Peste
- Burning Spear
- Young Gods
- Tricky
- Anthony B
- Joseph Arthur
- Freestylers
- Nashville Pussy
- Innocent Criminals
- Amadou et Mariam
- Mass Hysteria
- K2R Riddim
- Fantômas

=== 2000 ===
- St Germain
- Moby
- The Cranberries
- Oasis
- Slayer
- Fu Manchu
- Muse
- Coldplay
- Nine Inch Nails
- Oomph
- Tryo
- Skirt
- Dionysos
- -M-
- Massilia Sound System
- Femi Kuti
- A Perfect Circle

=== 1999 ===
- Al Green
- Blondie
- Eagle-Eye Cherry
- Lenny Kravitz
- The Black Crowes
- Stereophonics
- Tricky
- Bloodhound Gang
- The Cardigans
- Marilyn Manson
- Matmatah
- Metallica
- Monster Magnet
- Placebo
- Skunk Anansie
- Hubert-Félix Thiéfaine
- Angra
- Cheb Mami
- Gus Gus
- Lofofora
- Mercury Rev
- P18
- Calexico
- Cree Summer
- Creed
- Everlast
- Masnada
- Mercyful Fate
- Polar
- Popa Chubby
- Rinocérose

=== 1998 ===
- The Prodigy
- Underworld
- Cornershop
- Iggy Pop
- Portishead
- Pulp
- Morcheeba
- Rammstein
- Sean Lennon
- Suicidal Tendencies
- Texas
- Faudel
- Heather Nova
- Jon Spencer Blues Explosion
- Louise Attaque
- NTM
- Asian Dub Foundation
- Divine Comedy
- Hotei
- Jean-Louis Aubert
- Passi
- Pigalle
- Automatics
- Awake
- Fonky Family
- Hare
- Jeremy
- Jim White
- K's Choice
- Tabula Rasa
- Tortoise

=== 1997 ===
- Simple Minds
- Radiohead
- Supergrass
- Smashing Pumpkins
- Chemical Brothers
- Placebo
- Suede
- Nada Surf
- Stereophonics
- Channel Zero
- Biohazard
- Live
- Melville
- Baby Bird
- No One Is Innocent
- Noir Désir
- Sloy
- 16 Horsepower
- Silverchair
- Rollins Band
- Fédération française de fonck (FFF)

=== 1996 ===
- Beck
- David Bowie
- Patti Smith
- Foo Fighters ("We were opening up for David Bowie..." recalled Dave Grohl. "It didn't make any sense for me: a drummer pretending to be a singer; to stand in front of so many people and try to entertain them all. Like, I'm not Freddie Mercury. And then David Bowie goes out and lifts a fucking finger and people go fucking berserk. I didn't understand it at all."
- Lou Reed
- Nick Cave
- Red Hot Chili Peppers
- Sepultura
- Skunk Anansie
- Ash
- The Bluetones
- Dog Eat Dog
- Frank Black
- Fun Lovin' Criminals
- Ministry
- Miossec
- NTM
- Raggasonic
- Silmarils
- The Bates
- Dominique A
- Ginkgo
- Loudblast
- Red Cardell

=== 1995 ===
- Blur
- The Cure
- Supergrass
- Jamiroquai
- Public Enemy
- Jeff Buckley
- Oasis
- Paul Weller
- The Roots
- Sheryl Crow
- Ben Harper
- Body Count
- Dave Matthews Band
- dEUS
- Renaud
- Terence Trent D'Arby
- Ange
- Arno
- Page and Plant
- Dreadzone
- Earthling
- Edwyn Collins
- Paradise Lost
- Senser
- Spearhead
- 18th Dye
- Alliance Ethnik
- Burning Heads
- Dag
- Gérald De Palmas
- Silverchair
- Ultimatum
- Tortoise

=== 1994 ===
- Björk
- ZZ Top
- Khaled
- The Pretenders
- Rage Against the Machine
- Chaka Demus & Pliers
- The Posies
- Rita Mitsouko
- Blind Fish
- Burma Shave
- Gary Clail
- Grant Lee Buffalo
- I Am
- Les Thugs
- Morphine
- Spin Doctors
- Swell
- Therapy?
- Fabulous Trobadors
- Helmet
- No One Is Innocent
- Nyah Fearties
- Rachid Taha
- Sons of the Desert
- Radiohead

=== 1993 ===
- Sonic Youth
- Ziggy Marley
- Lenny Kravitz
- The Lemonheads
- The Frank and Walters
- Black Crowes
- Jean-Louis Aubert
- Living Colour
- Midnight Oil
- Noir Désir
- Willy Deville
- Calvin Russell
- Chris Isaak
- Faith No More
- Galliano
- Jesus Jones
- MC Solaar
- Massilia Sound System
- Mau Mau
- Rattlesnakes
- Roadrunners

=== 1992 ===
- Bob Dylan
- Bryan Adams
- James Brown
- Lou Reed
- Moe Tucker
- Morrissey
- Manic Street Preachers
- Ned's Atomic Dustbin
- Rufus Thomas
- Wedding Present
- Alpha Blondy
- Black Maria
- Charlélie Couture
- Fishbone
- The Fools
- Jade
- Les Négresses Vertes
- Little Nemo
- Mike Rimbaud
- Milena
- Sapho
- Sunset
- Urban Dance Squad
- Wilko Johnson
- Betty Boop
- Résistance

=== 1991 ===
- Vopli Vidopliassova
- Pixies
- The House of Love
- INXS
- The Charlatans
- The Wailers
- Joe Jackson
- Mano Negra
- Axel Bauer
- James
- John Cale
- Pigalle

Vopli Vidopliassova's set was released on LP and CD a year later as Abo abo.

=== 1990 ===
- Alain Bashung
- Arno
- Jean-Louis Aubert
- Kheops
- Kunsertu
- Miss B. Haven
- Nuit d'Octobre
- Okeztra Luna
- Park Café
- Rictus
- Roe
- Santana
- Texas
- The Essence
- Top Model
- Trio Bulgarka
- Trovante
- Trypes

Due to a storm, many performances had to be cut out, including Davy Spillane Band - Hubert-Félix Thiéfaine - Les Garçons Bouchers - P.V.O. - Stephan Eicher - Stéphane Riva).

=== 1989 ===
- Catherine Lara
- Charlélie Couture
- Elvis Costello
- Jacques Higelin, Maurane
- Ange
- Les Garçons Bouchers
- Litfiba
- Nina Hagen
- Noir Désir
- Animal Grotesque
- Chihuahua
- E 127
- Enigmatic Légume
- Gamine
- Girls Without Curls
- Jade
- Jean-Louis Mahjun
- Les Cyclistes
- Les Infidèles
- Les Kidnappés De La Pleine Lune
- Les Raviolets
- Les Zamants
- The Blech
- The Renegades
- Untel Untel
- Anna Prucnal
- Christian Blondel
- Colette Magny
- Elmer Food Beat
- Emma Zita
- Fabienne Pralon
- Les Lolitas
- Mama Bea Tiekelski
- Pascal Mathieu
- Ravel Chapuis
- Véronique Gain
- Zaniboni
