= Keçkispasse? =

Studio album by Pleymo
- Released: 15 June 1999
- Genres: Nu metal; rap metal; funk metal
- Length: 63:17
- Labels: Wet Music (1999); Epic Records (2002)
- Producers: Stephan Kraemer; Pleymo

Pleymo chronology
Keçkispasse? (1999)	Episode 2: Medecine Cake (2002)

Keçkispasse? is the debut album by French nu metal act Pleymo. The album was released by independent label Wet Music on 15 June 1999, going on to sell 10,000 copies. It was reissued in 2002 by Epic Records, the label Pleymo had signed with in 2000.

== Background ==
"Nawak", "Untitled" and "Cosmic Gros Pluck" were written in 1997, appearing on Pleymo's first demo, also titled Keçkispasse?. The rest of the album consisted of previously unheard material.

== Reception ==
Professional ratings
Review scores
Source	Rating
Allmusic	2.5/5 stars

Allmusic called Keçkispasse? "a never-ending adrenaline rush", writing that the album is "a perfect soundtrack for a wide variety of physical activities [...] but if one is seeking any sort of musical inventiveness it would probably be a good idea to look elsewhere."

== Track listing ==
No.	Title	Length
1.	"Yallah"	0:55
2.	"Blöhm"	2:42
3.	"Frakasse Smala"	5:24
4.	"Siliclone Liquid"	4:42
5.	"Nawak" (feat. Enhancer)	5:26
6.	"Porn" (feat. Enhancer)	5:54
7.	"K-Ra"	4:32
8.	"Cosmic Gros Pluck"	5:00
9.	"Bigquick"	5:09
10.	"Soukaripa" (feat. Enhancer & Wünjo)	4:40
11.	"T.N." (feat. AqME & Enhancer)	5:02
12.	"Millesime Team" (feat. Enhancer)	4:42
13.	"Vost"	13:52
14.	"Untitled" (hidden track)
Total length:		63:17

== Notes ==
- The track T.N. is performed with AqME and Enhancer, and stands for Team Nowhere, an association of nu metal musical groups in France, which includes Enhancer and included AqME at the time of the recording.
- The track Frakasse Smala talks about Team Nowhere and how the bands in the association should stay united ("Gardons notre unité", meaning "let's stay united"). Pleymo mentions AqME (under their former band name Neurosyndrom) among other bands, such as Wünjo, Enhancer, Watcha, and Noisy Fate.

== Credits ==
- Mark Maggiori (aka Kemar): vocals
- Erik Devilloutreys (aka Riko): guitar
- Davy Portela (aka Vost): guitar
- Benoit Julliard (aka B1): bass
- Fred Ceraudo (aka Burns): drums
- Frank Bailleul (aka Kefran): DJ
- Stephan Kraemer: mixing and recording
