= AqME =

French metal band

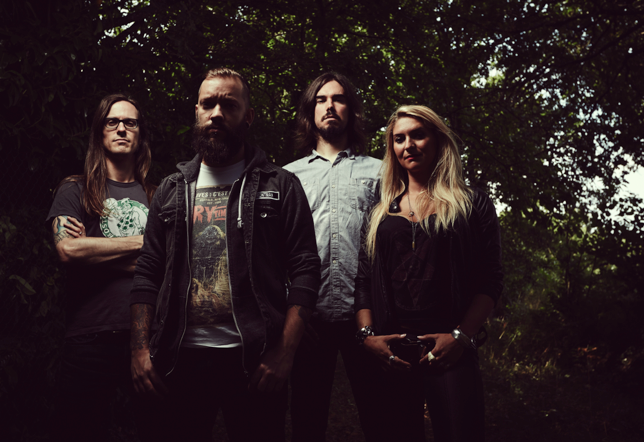
- AqME in 2014

Background information
- Also known as: Neurosyndrom (1996–1999)
- Origin: Paris, France
- Genres: Alternative metal, alternative rock, nu metal, metalcore
- Years active: 1999–2019
- Label: At(h)ome
- Members: Vincent Peignart-Mancini; Charlotte Poiget; Étienne Sarthou; Julien Hekking
- Past members: Sophie Chaussade; Benjamin Rubin; Thomas Thirrion

AqME (pronounced ack-MEE; previously known as Neurosyndrom) was a French alternative metal band from Paris, consisting of four members. AqME was part of a French nu metal movement called "Team Nowhere" for a few years, but the band eventually left this artist collective. The band was active from 1999 to 2019, releasing seven studio albums.

== History ==
=== Formation and University of Nowhere (1999–2001) ===
AqME was formed at the end of 1999 after the break-up of Neurosyndrom, one of the founding bands of the music collective Team Nowhere. The band name was inspired by the Ancient Greek word "akmê" meaning the climax or turning point of something. At the time of its formation, Aqme's line-up was composed of ETN (Étienne) on drums, Ben (Benjamin) on guitar, Sofy (Sophie) on bass (who will later be replaced by Charlotte), and Koma (Thomas) on vocals. Six months after the band's formation, the quartet released a five-track demo, University of Nowhere. At this period, when the band started appearing in several compilations, Sofy left the band. Charlotte then replaced her. They reissue 2000 copies of University of Nowhere in April 2001.

=== Sombres efforts and Polaroïds and Pornographie (2001–2004) ===
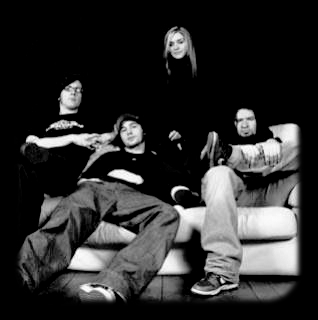
AqME during the Sombres efforts (2002) promotion (from left to right: Sarthou, Thirrion, Poiget, and Rubin)

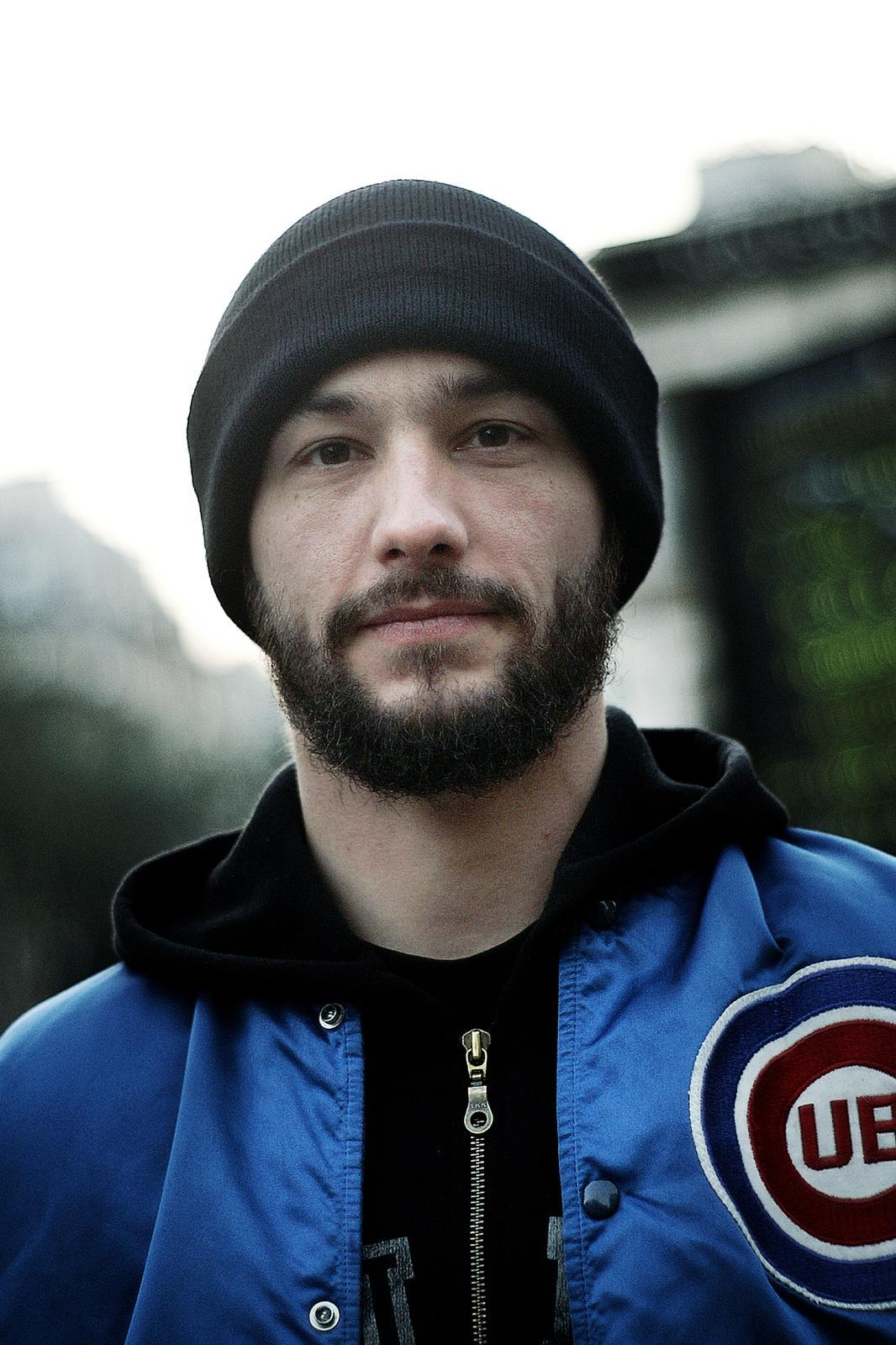
Thirrion in Paris, 2005

Not satisfied with their previous releases, the band worked in a recording studio for a year to create their debut album. They went to record in Sweden with Swedish producer Daniel Bergstrand, who is known for working with Meshuggah, In Flames, and Misery Loves Co. AqME then came back to France and played in concerts with other French bands such as Unfold and Mass Hysteria. AqME's new songs attracted more people to the concerts, and the band eventually gained a wider audience.

AqME's critical acclaim occurred after the release of their first album, Sombre Efforts (French for "Dark Efforts"). They carried out a relatively large tour across France between September 2002 and October 2003, with a notable success at the Eurockéennes de Belfort. At the end of 2003, the Parisian band returned to the recording studio to produce their second album, Polaroïds & Pornographie (French for "Polaroids & Pornography").

By April 2004, Sombres efforts had sold over 25,000 copies. The band publicly announced their departure from Team Nowhere on 12 September 2004.

=== La Fin des Temps and Live(s) (2005–2006) ===
After a lengthy tour, the band began recording their third album without Daniel Bergstrand. They chose Steve Prestage as a producer and stayed in Paris for the recording. The album La Fin des Temps (French for "The End of Time") was released in October 2005 and generated a song, "Pas assez loin", which was played on the radio. This third album had more prominent guitar parts but remained playable live. The lyrics centred around different topics such as euthanasia in "Ainsi soit-il", apprehension of death in "La Belle Inconnue", the downfall of the world in "La Fin des Temps", and human relationships. The band had recorded a track with Indochine, "Aujourd'hui je pleure", which was featured on Indochine's album, Alice & June. AqME was therefore the opening act for Indochine's concerts.

The band also released its first live DVD, Live(s), recorded in Nantes, France, on 2 June 2006.

After a concert at the Paris Olympia on 21 October 2006, the band members announced that they planned to disappear the following year and return with a fourth album in 2008.

=== Hiatus and side projects (2006–2007) ===
During this period, three of the four members had a side project. On 26 November 2006, Étienne's side project, Grymt, released its first record, My Dark One.

In June 2007, Thomas and Ben announced via Myspace that they were both working on the debut album for their new bands, Vicky Vale and Die on Monday.

=== Hérésie and En l'honneur de Jupiter (2007–2010) ===
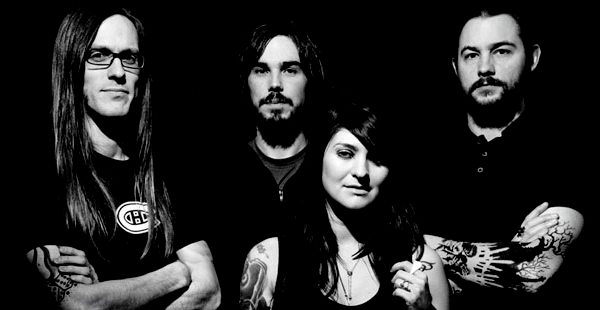
AqME at the time of En l'honneur de Jupiter (2009) (from left to right: Sarthou, Hekking, Poiget, and Thirrion)

AqME's fourth studio album, Hérésie (French for "Heresy"), was released on 4 February 2008.

After ten years of playing music with his friends, Ben left AqME in November 2008 to devote himself entirely to his own band, Die on Monday. After a period of inactivity, AqME integrated Mulder (Julien Hekking) as guitarist in January 2009; he and ETN both performed in the band Grymt. This new quartet recorded a fifth album, En l'honneur de Jupiter (French for "In Honour of Jupiter"), which was released on 19 October 2009.

=== Épithète, Dominion, Épitaphe and Les Sentiers de l'aube (2011–2013) ===
To the surprise of the other members of Aqme, the singer announced his complete withdrawal from the music scene in March 2012. Their sixth album, Épithète, Dominion, Épitaphe, was released on 10 April 2012 as Thirrion's swan song. Vincent Peignart-Mancini took over from Thirrion during the tour that followed the album's release.

With this new singer, AqME released an EP titled Les Sentiers de l'aube (French for "The Paths of Dawn") on 15 October 2012. The EP featured three unreleased and three live songs from the previous albums.

Thirrion embarked on a tattoo artist apprenticeship and began his new career in the shop of Tin-Tin in Paris.

=== Dévisager Dieu and AqME (2014–2017) ===
On 3 November 2014, AqME released their seventh album, Dévisager Dieu (French for "Staring at God"). A music video for "Avant le Jour" was available before the release. The band returned to the road in late November 2014 to promote their new album, giving Charlotte time to complete her pregnancy. Vincent's twin brother, Julien Peignart-Mancini, took over the bass position for the remainder of the tour.

To celebrate the 15th anniversary of the first album Sombres efforts, AqME reissued it on 21 April 2017 on a CD version (consisting of 2 discs, one for the album remastered by Magnus Lindberg and the second containing demo versions as well as an unreleased recording from that same era) and an LP version on the occasion of Record Store Day on 22 April.

On 17 May 2017, the band released the music video for "Tant d'années," one of the songs from their upcoming album, AqME. This new album was announced on 22 September 2017.

=== Requiem, disbandment and farewell tour (2019) ===
On 11 November 2018, AqME announced on social media, through a long communiqué, that 2019 would be the last year for the band, which was getting ready to celebrate its twentieth anniversary, explaining that it has reached the end of a human and artistic adventure.

On April 12, 2019, they released their ninth album, Requiem. They disbanded after a ten-date farewell tour, crossing France and Belgium from March 2019 to January 2020. They played their last concert on 11 January 2020 at Le Trianon in Paris, with two original band members: Thirrion (Koma) on vocals and Rubin (Ben) on guitar. However, the last dates were cancelled due to the health problems of the band's singer, Peignart-Mancini.

== Influences ==
The band cited Nirvana, Soundgarden, Cold, Chokebore, Unfold, Deftones, and Korn as their main influences.

== Band members ==
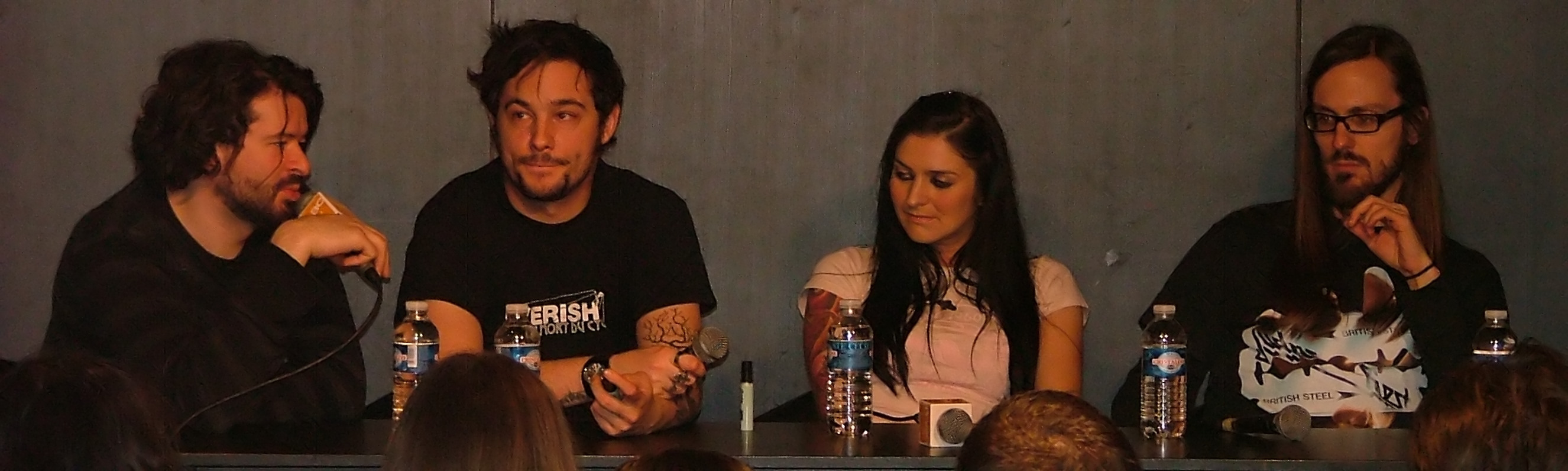
AqME in Toulouse, France, 2008 (from left to right: Rubin, Thirrion, Poiget, and Sarthou)

Final line-up

- Étienne Sarthou / "ETN" — drums (since 1999)
- Charlotte Poiget / "Charlotte" — bass (since 2000)
- Julien Hekking / "Mulder" — guitars (since 2009)
- Vincent Peignart-Mancini / "Vinc" — vocals (since 2012)

Former members

- Thomas Thirrion / "Koma" — vocals (1999–2012)
- Benjamin Rubin / "Ben" — guitars (1999–2008)
- Sophie Chaussade / "Sofy" — bass (1999–2000)

Touring musicians

- Julien Peignart-Mancini – bass (2015)

Timeline

== Discography ==
=== Studio albums ===
Sombres efforts (2002)

1. Superstar
2. « Si » n'existe pas ("‘If‘ doesn't exist")
3. Le Rouge et le Noir ("The Red and the Black")
4. Tout à un détail près ("All except for one detail")
5. Instable ("Unstable")
6. Une autre ligne ("Another line")
7. Je suis ("I am")
8. Fin ("End")
9. Sainte ("Holy")
10. In Memoriam (Latin for "Into memory")
11. Délicate & saine ("Delicate & healthy"; word play with "Delicatessen")

Polaroïds & Pornographie (Original Edition / Limited Edition) (2004)

1. Pornographie ("Pornography")
2. À chaque seconde ("Every second")
3. 3'38
4. Tes mots me manquent ("I miss your words" / "Your words fail me")
5. La Théorie du poisson rouge ("The goldfish theory")
6. Sur le fil ("On the edge" / "By a thread")
7. Vampire
8. Comprendre ("Understand")
9. Être & ne pas être ("To be & not to be")
10. Ce que tu es ("What you are")
11. La vie est belle ("Life is beautiful")
12. La réponse ("The answer")

CD2 (Limited Edition)

1. Automédication ("Self-medication")
2. Le rouge & le noir (live) ⑵
3. Tout à un détail près (live) ⑵
4. Je suis (live) ⑵
5. Fin (live) ⑵
6. " Si " n'existe pas (live) ⑵

⑴ Presented as such on the album back cover.
⑵ Track recorded at the Eurockéennes de Belfort in July 2003.

La Fin des Temps (Original Edition / CD+DVD Edition) (2005)

1. Ténèbres ("Darkness")
2. Des illusions ("Some illusions"; word play with French for "Disillusion/Disillusionment")
3. La fin des temps ("The End of Time")
4. Une vie pour rien ("A life for nothing")
5. Ainsi soit-il ("Thus be it")
6. Une dernière fois ("One last time")
7. Pas assez loin ("Not far enough")
8. Rien au monde ("Nothing in the world")
9. Le Poids des mots ("The weight of words")
10. La Belle Inconnue ("The Beautiful Unknown/Stranger")

DVD (CD+DVD Edition)
Making Of

Hérésie (Original Edition / Limited Edition) (2008)

1. Hérésie ("Heresy")
2. Uniformes ("Uniforms"—same ‘unvarying, conform/outfit’ double meaning)
3. Lourd sacrifice ("Heavy sacrifice")
4. Un goût amer ("A bitter taste")
5. Karma & nicotine
6. Les enfers ("The underworld")
7. En saga om livet (Swedish for "A story about life")
8. Romance mathématique ("Mathematical romance")
9. Casser/détruire ("Break/destroy")
10. 312
11. A.M.: un jour de pluie ("A.M.—Automutilation, French for ‘self-harm’—: a rainy day")
12. Triskaïdékaphobie ("Triskaidekaphobia")
13. Utilisation de la synthèse additive ⑴ ("Additive color use")

⑴ Track included in the Limited Edition of the album.

En l'honneur de Jupiter (Original Edition / Limited Edition) (2009)

1. Tout le monde est malheureux ("Everyone is unhappy")
2. Guillotine
3. Les matamores ("The braggarts")
4. Noël Noir ("Black Christmas")
5. Macabre moderne ("Modern macabre")
6. Le culte du rien ("The cult of the nothingness")
7. Blasphème ("Blasphemy")
8. Stadium Complex
9. Question de violence ("Question of violence")
10. Vivre à nouveau ("Live once again")
11. Le chaos ("The chaos")
12. Uppe på berget (Swedish for "On the mountain")

DVD (Limited Edition)

- Making of
- Video teaser
- Photo gallery

Épithète, Dominion, Épitaphe (Original Edition / Limited Edition) (2012)

1. Idiologie ("Idiology"; portmanteau with "Idiot" and "Ideology")
2. Quel que soit le Prométhéen (ou le Nihiliste) ("Whatever the Promethean (or the Nihilist) is")
3. Épithète, Dominion, Épitaphe ("Epithet, Dominion, Epitaph")
4. Luxe assassin ("Deadly luxury")
5. L'empire des jours semblables ("The empire of the indistinguishable days")
6. Adieu ! ("Farewell!")
7. My English Is Pretty Bad
8. Marketing Armageddon
9. Plus tard vs trop tard ("Later vs. too late")
10. La dialectique des possédés ("The dialectic of possessed")
11. 110.587

CD2 – Les Sentiers de l'Aube (EP) (Limited Edition)

Dévisager Dieu (2014)

1. Avant le jour ("Before the day") (Video: https://www.youtube.com/watch?v=cjaQPArjdAE)
2. Enfants de Dieu ("Children of God")
3. Au-delà de l'ombre ("Beyond the shadow")
4. Ce que nous sommes ("What we are")
5. Un appel ("A call")
6. Entre louanges et regrets ("Between praises and regrets")
7. L'homme et le sablier ("The man and the hourglass")
8. Pour le meilleur, le pire ("For the best, the worst"; word play with "For better, for worse")
9. Les abysses ("The abysses")

AqME (2017)

1. Ensemble ("Together")
2. Tant d'années ("So many years")
3. Refuser le silence ("Refuse the silence")
4. Enfant du ciel ("Child of the sky")
5. Rien ne nous arrêtera ("Nothing will stop us") (featuring Reuno)
6. Si loin ("So far away")
7. Tout est supplice ("Everything is torture")
8. Un damné ("A damned")
9. Meurs ! ("Die!")
10. Une promesse ("A promise")
11. Se souvenir ("Remember")
12. M.E.S.S.

Requiem (2019)

1. Entre les mains ("Between/In the hands")
2. Enfer ("Hell")
3. Un adieu ("A farewell/goodbye")
4. Illusion
5. Paradis ("Paradise")
6. Sous d'autres cieux ("Under other skies / In other climes")
7. Requiem
8. Un autre signe ("Another sign")
9. Sans oublier ("Without forget[ting]")

=== EPs ===
==== As Neurosyndrom ====
Confusionmentale (1998)

1. Miss
2. Schizoïdes ("Schizoids")
3. Bleu ("Blue")
4. Candelia
5. 26 hidden track

==== As AqME ====
University of Nowhere (1999)

1. Encore une fois ("Once again")
2. T.N.
3. À jamais ("Forever")
4. Words
5. Beauté vénéneuse ("Poisonous beauty")

AqME (2004)

1. Chaque seconde ⑴
2. Pornographie
3. Ce que tu es

⑴ Presented as such on the album back cover.

Les Sentiers de l'Aube (2012) ⑴

1. Tout s'effondre ("Everything collapses")
2. Fils ingrat ("Ungrateful son")
3. Autolyse ("Autolysis")
4. Idiologie (live)
5. Pornographie (live)
6. Luxe assassin (live)

⑴ Included as second part of the Épithète, Dominion, Épitaphe studio album Limited Edition.

=== Demos ===
==== As Neurosyndrom ====
Slimfast (1997)

1. Green Ticket
2. N°26
3. Don't Marry Me

=== Reissues ===
University of Nowhere (Limited Edition) (2000)

1. Encore une fois
2. T.N.
3. À jamais
4. Words
5. Beauté vénéneuse
6. Sainte ⑴
7. Bulmas ⑴
8. Mis à quia ⑴ (synonym of "Silenced")

⑴ Bonus track unreleased in the first edition.

Sombres efforts ("15th Anniversary" Remastered 2-Disc Deluxe Edition) (2017)

CD1 – Album studio remasterisé

1. Superstar
2. " Si " n'existe pas
3. Le Rouge et le Noir
4. Tout à un détail près
5. Instable
6. Une autre ligne
7. Je suis
8. Fin
9. Sainte
10. In Memoriam
11. Délicate & saine

CD2 – Raretés

Maquettes SE#1

1. " Si " n'existe pas (Demo version)
2. Délicate et saine (Demo version)
3. Instable (Demo version)
4. Une autre ligne (Demo version)

Maquettes SE#2

1. Superstar (Demo version)
2. Le Rouge et le Noir (Demo version)
3. In Memoriam (Demo version)
4. Je suis (Demo version)

Inédits

1. Sombres efforts ("Dark efforts") (Demo version)
2. TNT (Instrumental demo version)

Version inédite

1. Tout à un détail près (Demo version)

=== Live recordings ===
Live(s) (2006)

1. Ténèbres
2. Des illusions
3. Être & ne pas être
4. Ce que tu es
5. Le Rouge & le Noir
6. À chaque seconde
7. Pornographie
8. 3'38
9. Tout à un détail près
10. La Belle Inconnue
11. Pas assez loin
12. La réponse
13. Ainsi soit-il
14. Superstar
15. Le poids des mots
16. "Si" n'existe pas

== Sources ==
- Official website (French)
- "Poussée d'AqME" (French)
- Pictures of AqME during a concert for fundraising concerning AIDS (French)
