= EZ3kiel =

French musical group

- Origin: La Riche, Tours, France
- Genres: Electro-acoustic, dub, trip hop, rock, symphonic music
- Years active: 1993-present
- Label: Jarring Effects
- Members: Joan Guillon; Yann Nguema; Stéphane Babiaud
- Past members: Matthieu Fays (founding member); Florent Duytschaever (founding member); Brigitte Amédomé; Sylvain Joubert
- Website: www.ez3kiel.com

Ezekiel stylized as EZ3kiel is a French musical group formed in 1993 originating from La Riche, Tours, France. It now consists of three members Joan Guillon (main songwriter and guitarist), Yann Nguema (former bassist in charge of visual and interactive aspect) and Stéphane Babiaud (training percussionist, multi-instrumentalist and arranger). Matthieu Fays (drummer), a founder of EZ3kiel withdrew from the group in May 2012 after twenty years of collaboration.

Vocalist Brigitte Amédomé and guitarist Florent Duytschaever participated in the project during its first years of existence (1994-1999). Stéphane Babiaud joined the group in 2007 after recording the album Naphtaline to which he actively participated. The band has been involved in parallel projects, classical music project Naphtaline Orchestra, exhibitions notably Les Mécaniques Poétiques d'EZ3kiel, theatrical, poetic and musical collaborations with a great number of independent artists.

== Career ==
The group was named Ezekiel in reference to the fake Biblical quote from Pulp Fiction, directed by Quentin Tarantino but was renamed EZ3kiel. The original line-up founding members in 1993 were Yann Nguema (bass), Florent Duytschaever (guitar) and Matthieu Fays (drums). In 1994, they were joined by Brigitte Amédomé on vocals and Joan Guillon (guitar and keyboards). Joan Guillon was also responsible for the production side and sampling, whereas Yann Nguema is responsible for the visual aspects of production. Vocalist Brigitte Amédomé and guitarist Florent Duytschaever left the band in 1999.

The remaining trio of Yann Nguema, Matthieu Fays and Joan Guillon, released the first EP and maxi single Equalize It as EZ3kiel in 1999 as a self-production. The band developed a trip hop oriented dub and jungle music including a strong audio-visual creative look, graphic identity and unique mix of music ambiance, lighting and scenography. 2001 saw the release of the album Handle with Care with Jarring Effects label and Discograph. In 2003, the band released the album BARB4RY. In 2004, EZ3kiel toured with the Belgian Flemish band DAAU in "Versus Tour". In 2005, they cooperated with Nosfell for presentations at Eurockéennes at Belfort and in 2009 in "Collision Tour" with French rock fusion group Hint.

EZ3kiel is well known for having collaborated with a great number of independent artists like Yann Tiersen, Sylvestre from Dit Terzi, Sir Jean from Meï Teï Sho, Angélique Willkie (from Zap Mama), Angelo Moore (from Fishbone), the Belgian Flemish band DAAU, Black Sifichi, Nosfell and Pierre Le Bourgeois, Narrow Terence, Blurum, La Trabant, Hint etc.

The multi-instrumentalist Stéphane Babiaud joined in as an invited musician 2007 and the band released Naphtaline as an album and as a DVD release With the album Battlefield, the follow-up to Naphtaline, Stéphane Babiaud became a permanent full-time member turning the trio into a 4-member band, playing drums, vibraphone, glockenspiel, keyboards and bass. With Matthieu Fays leaving in 2012, the band is now yet again a trio.

== Members ==
- 1993: Trio founding line-up of Yann Nguema, Matthieu Fays and Florent Duytschaever.
- 1994: Five-member band with Brigitte Amédomé vocals and Joan Guillon joining in
- 1999: Trio again with the line-up Matthieu Fays, Yann Nguema and Joan Guillon
- 2007: Four-member band Matthieu Fays, Yann Nguema and Joan Guillon and new member Stéphane Babiaud
- 2012: Trio Yann Nguema, Joan Guillon and Stéphane Babiaud with Matthieu Fays leaving the formation

== Projects ==
(Selective)

- 2005: EZ3kiel designed scenography, and three videos for the presentation of the members of the team of the French Ski Federation for the Winter Olympics in Turin in 2006. The project was directed by Yann Nguema of EZ3kiel.
- 2007: Naphtaline multimedia project with interactive CD / DVD video / DVD ROM where the viewer becomes an actor and evolves with paintings in sound and visual universe shaped by the group.
- 2008: Battlefield project and tour with the return of the guitar played by Joan Guillon. Cooperation with the theater team "Hexagon" in Meylan, for presentations at the biennial Arts-Sciences 2009.
- 2008: Invited by the Slovenian company "Beton Tank", EZ3kiel composed and played the music of the show RunForLove presented at Festival Aurillac 2008.
- 2009: Naphtaline Orchestra with around 40 musicians from the Music Academy of Grenoble and conducted by EZ3kiel's new member Stéphane Babiaud. The formation played live in 2009 composed pieces mainly from the band's Naphtaline album played with a symphonic orchestra with repeated performances in 2011 and 2012 giving the band more following and announcement of the musical project EZ3kiel Extended in September 2012 with series of concerts of image and sound. Principal members included Sylvain Joubert (bass), Cyril Soufflet (piano), Gérald Bouvet (guitar), Erick Pigeard (percussions), Thomas Quinart (theremin, baryton saxophone and musical saw), Bertrand Margelidon (trumpet, flugelhorn), Simon Dupire (trombon), Pierre Malle and Ombeline Collin (violin), Anthony Chéneau (alto violin) and Benjamin Garnier (cello) for performances at the Hexagon Meylan.
- 2009-2012: Les Mécaniques Poétiques d'EZ3kiel an exhibition of ten interactive sound works incorporating music and poetry with new technologies, science and mathematics for the Atelier Arts-Sciences event financed by CEA-Grenoble and theatrical project Hexagone Scène nationale de Meylan, Erasme (Multimedia Centre of Rhône), Médias-cité and DICREAM. It was also exposed in 2010 World Expo in Shanghai, at the Palais de la découverte, at la maison des métallos à Paris.

== Discography ==
Title and details	Peak positions
Title and details	FR
Equalize It EP: Released: 1999; Format: EP - 8 tracks; Record label: Jarring Effects	–
Handle with Care: Released: 2001; Format: Album Digipack; Record label: Jarring Effects	–
Barb4ry: Released: 2003; Credits: In collaboration with DAAU; Format: Album Digipack; Record label: Jarring Effects / Discograph	–
Versus Tour (Live 2004): Released: 2004; Format: CD Live + DVD; Record label: Jarring Effects	57
Naphtaline: Released: 2007; Format: Studio album + DVD ROM + DVD Video; Record label: Jarring Effects	65
Battlefield: Released: 2008; Format: Studio album Digipack; Record label: Jarring Effects	65
Collision Tour: Released: 2010; Credited to: Hint vs. Ez3kiel; Format: CD Live + DVD; Record label: Jarring Effects	163
Naphtaline Orchestra: Released: 2013; Credited to: Ez3kiel And The Naphtaline Orchestra; Format: CD Live + DVD; Record label: Kika	78
EZ3kiel Extended: Released: 27 April 2013; Format: Vinyl Live - 5 tracks; Record label: Independently	–
LUX: Released: 2014; Format: Studio album + EP Bonus LUX Continuum (4 more tracks); Record label: Kika	73
