= Lycée François-Ier =

Lycée François-Ier may refer to:

- Lycée François-Ier in Le Havre
- Lycée François-Ier (Fontainebleau)
- Lycée François-Ier in Vitry-le-François (school complex).
