= Episode 2: Medecine Cake =

Studio album by Pleymo
- Released: 5 June 2002
- Recorded: February–May 2001
- Genre: Nu metal; rap metal
- Length: 45:18
- Label: Epic

Pleymo chronology
Keçkispasse? (1999)	Episode 2: Medecine Cake (2002)	Rock (2003)

Singles from Medecine Cake
- 1. "New Wave" Released: 2001; 2. "United Nowhere" Released: 2002

Professional ratings
Review scores
Source	Rating
RockHard	6/10 stars

Episode 2: Medecine Cake is the second album by French nu metal band Pleymo. Released on 5 June 2002 by Epic Records, it was recorded with alternate vocal tracks in French and English languages. The English version of the album was released under the title Doctor Tank's Medicine Cake. The album sold over 50,000 copies.

== Music and album concept ==
The musical style of Episode 2: Medecine Cake leans heavily toward hip-hop. An alternate English language version of the album was released, although the French-language version of the album contains some lyrics sung in English. The English-language version of the album is also a different mix, deleting the scratching from the song "New Wave", the interlude from "World", and guest vocals from the leader of the French band Wünjo from the "Compact". The French version also features a song not found on the English version, "Casino". Whether this song was recorded with English vocals but never released is unknown. The album's concept is tied around comic book artwork drawn by vocalist Mark.

When the album was issued in Japan, the import edition featured the song "K-Ra", taken directly from their previous album Keçkispasse, without any changes.

== Release ==
A maxi single was released in 2001 to promote the album, containing the tracks "New Wave", "Tout Le Monde Se Lève", "World", "Ce Soir C'Est Le Grand Soir" and "Kubrick". The same year, the band released a music video for the song "New Wave". The album was released in 2002 on CD and vinyl in French language and on CD in English language under the title Doctor Tank's Medicine Cake. In Japan, the French-language version of the album included a bonus track, "K-Ra". Keckispasse was not formally released in Germany, so this album was the first release there.

In 2008, the song "New Wave" was released as a downloadable track for the game Rock Band.

== Reception ==
Australian reviewer Dead Phoenix Underground gave the album a 9 out of 10 rating, writing "this album should be on your must have list."

Episode 2: Medecine Cake sold over 50,000 copies, performing better than Keçkispasse. The English-language version of the album, Doctor Tank's Medicine Cake, increased the band's popularity in Japan.

== Track listing ==
French-language version
No.	Title	Length
1.	"Intro : Dr Volodim Tank Feature Animation"	1:06
2.	"Tank Club"	3:25
3.	"New Wave"	3:31
4.	"Kubrick"	3:31
5.	"Tout Le Monde Se Lève"	3:35
6.	"United Nowhere"	3:45
7.	"World"	3:53
8.	"Compact"	3:45
9.	"Ce Soir C'est Grand Soir"	4:00
10.	"Shugga"	3:38
11.	"Star FM-R"	3:42
12.	"Casino"	3:55
13.	"Muck"	3:32

Japanese edition bonus track
No.	Title	Length
14.	"K-Ra"

English-language version
No.	Title	Length
1.	"Intro: Dr Volodim"
2.	"Tank Club"
3.	"New Wave"
4.	"Kubrick"
5.	"We All Gotta Get Up"
6.	"United Nowhere"
7.	"World"
8.	"Compact"
9.	"Tonight"
10.	"Shugga"
11.	"This Way I Feel"
12.	"Muck"

== Personnel ==
- Bi – bass
- Fred aka Burns – drums
- Mark – vocal
- Erik – guitars
- Davy aka Vost – guitars
- Frank aka Da Beast – tablist
