= Les Infidèles (disambiguation) =

Les Infidèles is a French rock band.

Les Infidèles may also refer to:

- Les Infidèles (1973 film), a 1973 French film by Christian Lara
- The Players (2012 film) (Les Infidèles), an omnibus film starring Jean Dujardin and Gilles Lellouche
