= Rock (album) =

Studio album by Pleymo
- Released: 27 October 2003
- Genre: Nu metal; alternative metal; alternative rock
- Length: 55:00
- Label: Epic

Pleymo chronology
Episode 2: Medecine Cake (2002)	Rock (2003)	Alphabet Prison (2006)

Rock is the third studio album by French nu metal band Pleymo. Released on 27 October 2003, the album sees the band shifting towards a more melodic musical style which is less aggressive than their previous releases. Rock is a concept album about a four-year-old blind boy and his imaginary twin.

== Music style and album concept ==
With the recording of Rock, Pleymo sought to shift their music toward a more melodic and less aggressive style than their previous albums. The band also wrote the songs to form a concept album about a boy, blind and four years of age, and his imaginary double.

== Release ==
A music video for the album's title track was released in 2005. A variant edition of the album contained a bonus DVD featuring live concert footage and music videos.

== Legacy ==
The songs "Divine Excuse", "Polyester Môme", "1977", "Modaddiction", "Rock", and "Cherubin" were included on the band's 2005 live album, Ce Soir C'Est Grand Soir.

== Track listing ==
1. Le Voyage de Rock – 1:30
2. Rock – 3:20
3. 1977 – 4:17
4. Divine Excuse – 3:30
5. L'insolent – 3:21
6. Modaddiction – 4:12
7. Sommes Nous? – 3:24
8. Zorro – 2:54
9. Polyester Mome – 3:42
10. Une Vie de Details – 3:46
11. Cherubin – 3:03
12. Anemia – 3:34
13. Kongen (ft. Enhancer) – 3:50
14. Laugh Calvin – 10:37

Total length: 55:00

Track 14 is in fact during 4:35 then after a silence of two minutes a hidden track starts.

== Personnel ==
- Mark Maggiori (Kemar): vocals
- Erik Devilloutreys (Riko): guitar
- Davy Portela (Vost): guitar
- Benoit Juillard (B1): bass
- Fred Ceraudo (Burns): drums
- Frank Bailleul (Kefran): DJ
