= Jarring Effects =

French record label

Jarring Effects is a French musical label based in Lyon, south-east of France. Jarring Effects encourages musicians to be independent, produce the music themselves, be creative and to make music they enjoy rather than trying to make it commercially viable. It was created on an associative basis and remains an association.

Jarring Effects is often associated with High Tone and Ez3kiel, electro-dub bands from France, but a lot of underground audio-activists have had albums or songs released on the label. Jarring Effects Label is a cooperative since 2007.

== Bands ==
- High Tone
- La Phaze
- Interlope
- Meï Teï Shô
- L'Œuf raide
- Monsieur orange
- Ez3kiel
- Reverse Engineering
- Brain Damage
- Twelve
- R-zatz
- Fumuj
- Playdoe
- Brigadier JC
- B r oad way
- Revo
- Grosso Gadgetto
- Von Magnet
- Vuneny
- Idem
- Ben Sharpa
- Sibot
- Cape Town Beats
- Oddateee

== See also ==
- List of record labels
