= Anatane: Saving the Children of Okura =

French-Canadian animated television series

- Genre: Science fiction, adventure
- Created by: Mark Maggiori
- Written by: Mark Maggiori; Éric Rondeaux
- Directed by: Marc Boréal
- Voices of: Xavier Dolan; Hugolin Chevrette; Elisabeth Choudvalizé; Sylvain Hétu; Sarah-Jeanne Labrosse; Mélanie Laberge; Daniel Picard; Léa Coupal-Soutière
- Theme music composer: Pascal Obispo
- Composers: Mark Maggiori; Franck Bailleul
- Countries of origin: France; Canada
- Original language: French
- No. of seasons: 1
- No. of episodes: 26

Production
- Executive producers: Dominique Boischot; Paul Cadieux; S.K. Kim
- Running time: 26 minutes
- Production companies: Les Films de la Perrine; Tooncan (Note: Animation outsourced to Hanho Heung-Up); France Télévisions

Original release
- Network: Unis TV; France 4
- Release: September 8 – December 2, 2018

Anatane: Saving the Children of Okura (French: Anatane et les enfants d'Okura) is a French–Canadian animated science fiction adventure television series created by French artist Mark Maggiori. A serialized, manga-influenced story, it follows a boy who flees a dictatorship and travels from a devastated Paris to Okura, a mysterious city in Japan. The series was produced by Les Films de la Perrine and Tooncan in conjunction with France Télévisions, and its title character is voiced by Xavier Dolan. After a long and troubled development that began in 2002, it premiered in Canada on Unis TV in September 2018 and in France on France 4 in June 2019.

== Premise ==
The series is set in a dystopian future where, as boys approach the age of 15, they are taken to Okura to be turned into docile workers known as "Buzi". After a snowball fight changes his fate, the title character Anatane Goliatkine discovers that he has the power to become invisible and becomes a fugitive. To end the dictatorship and free the Buzi, he leaves Paris with his friends Nikita and Nevenaa and his younger sister Ariane on a long journey east to Okura.

== Production ==
In 2002, Mark Maggiori received funding to develop "Anton ou Les enfants d’Okura" from the CNC. A year later, he registered the domain name Anatane.com. French animation website Catsuka noticed references to an animated series on his website and reached out to him in September 2004. Maggiori stated that the show was in development with France Télévisions and Canal J at Les Films de la Perrine with an expected release in 2006. At the time, he had hoped Japanese animation studio Production I.G. would agree to co-produce it.

Shortly after, users on the site discovered that much of the Anatane concept art had directly lifted imagery from a number of anime productions. Maggiori responded to the allegations by claiming they were placeholder images that wouldn't make it into the final show. Catsuka members later uncovered additional plagiarized work by Maggiori that eventually led to them creating a contest to discover more.

In 2005, Canadian animation studio Tooncan was brought on as co-producers, with France 2 as the broadcaster and Carrere Group as the distributor. The budget was set at €5.9 million, with production expected to wrap up by September 2006. In 2007, the series received capital from the Shaw Rocket Fund, with the Canadian broadcast partner listed as Télé-Québec.

The following year, Anantane was presented at Cartoons on the Bay. It was also showcased at the 2008 Annecy International Animated Film Festival where it was reported that five episodes had been completed, but that the series was unlikely to be finished. Shortly after, Carrere Group filed for bankruptcy.

In 2017, work on the series resumed at Megafun Productions, a Canadian animation studio founded by former Tooncan owner Paul Cadieux.

== Broadcast ==
Anatane debuted in Canada on Unis TV on September 8, 2018. In France, the series began airing on France 4 on June 29, 2019. The first three episodes were made available through the channel's website on June 7.

France Télévisions presented the series as a summer 2019 exclusive for France 4, airing on Saturdays at 11:10 a.m. from 29 June with episodes already available online through its Ludo platform and france.tv.
