= Lycée François-Ier (Fontainebleau) =

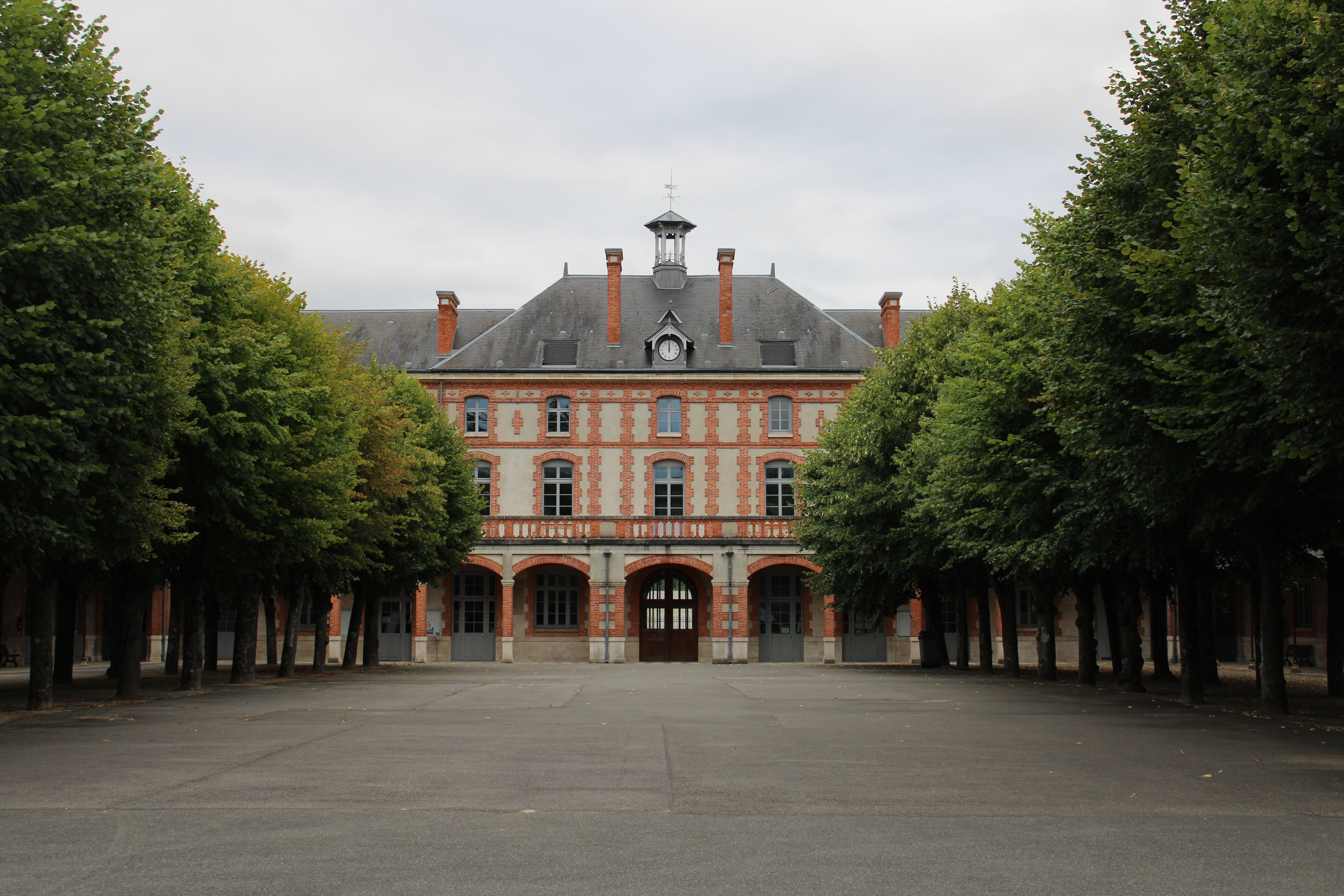
- 11 Rue Victor Hugo; 77300 Fontainebleau; France

Information
- Type: Public
- Motto: "Varis Verbis Vox Una"
- Established: 1882
- School district: Créteil
- Principal: Christopher Carton
- Gender: Co-educational
- Enrolment: 1390 (2020)

The Lycée François-Ier, in long form Lycée International François-Ier, is a public secondary school located in Fontainebleau, France. In addition to the mainstream public French curriculum, the institution houses private English and German-language sections through which students can take the option internationale du baccalauréat (OIB), the international variant of the French baccalauréat.

== History ==
Plans to establish a municipal school in Fontainebleau were first tabled in 1874 under president Patrice de MacMahon and minister of public instruction Arthur de Cumont, the objective being to provide education for the sons of officers. After a competition was held in 1877, Henri Proust was officially commissioned in 1880 to design the new institution, which was founded at the site of a house Le Clos de Bel-Air (originally built in 1840) and would fall under the category of lycée.

The school was named Collège Carnot in 1888 after president Lazare Carnot. In 1910 under principal Boinet, dormitories and an infirmary were added. When France entered World War II in 1939, the campus was requisitioned. During the occupation of France, classes took place at the former Maison Sauvager on Rue Grande while the original premises was used as a field hospital. Only external students were permitted during this time.

Preparatory classes were introduced in 1948. The school was renamed Lycée François 1er in King Francis I of France's honour in 1960. The multilingual école international de Fontainebleau was established in 1959 in an agreement between the Ministry of Education and SHAPE, who eventually left in 1967. The Anglophone Section was created in 1979, the high school of which is hosted at the lycée.

Anglophone Section logo

In 2016, international was added to the title. Regional council president Valérie Pécresse brought the lycée as well as an elementary school (école élémentaire internationale Léonard-de-Vinci) and middle school (collège International) under the same international school banner, the campus international de Fontainebleau, so students could follow an international education throughout their schooling.

== Notable people ==
=== Alumni ===
- Thad Carhart (born 1950) American writer
- Pierre Casiraghi (born 1987), member of the Monegasque Princely Family
- Antoine Frisch (born 1996), Irish,French and English rugby union player
- Paul Ji (born 2004), Chinese-American pianist
- Pascal Lecocq (born 1958), painter and set designer
- Enrico Macias (born 1938) Algerian-French singer, songwriter and musician
- Philippe Mahut (1956–2014), footballer
- Mark Maggiori (born 1977), French-American artist and member of the band Pleymo
- Roger Rabiniaux (1914-1986) writer and poet
- Marie Reno (born 1986), comedian and musician
- Pascal Thomas (born 1945), screenwriter and actor
- Luke Thompson (born 1988), English actor
- Laurent Tirard (born 1967), filmmaker
- Guy Debord (born 1931), philosopher

=== Faculty ===
- Joseph Zobel (1915–2006)

== Partner schools ==
- (Poland) Adam Mickiewicz High School Kraków VI
- (Germany) Alexander-von-Humboldt-Gymnasium, Konstanz
- (United States) Charter School of Wilmington
- (Sweden) Franska Skolan
- (United Kingdom) North London Collegiate School
- (Australia) St Philip's College
