= High Tone =

French dub band

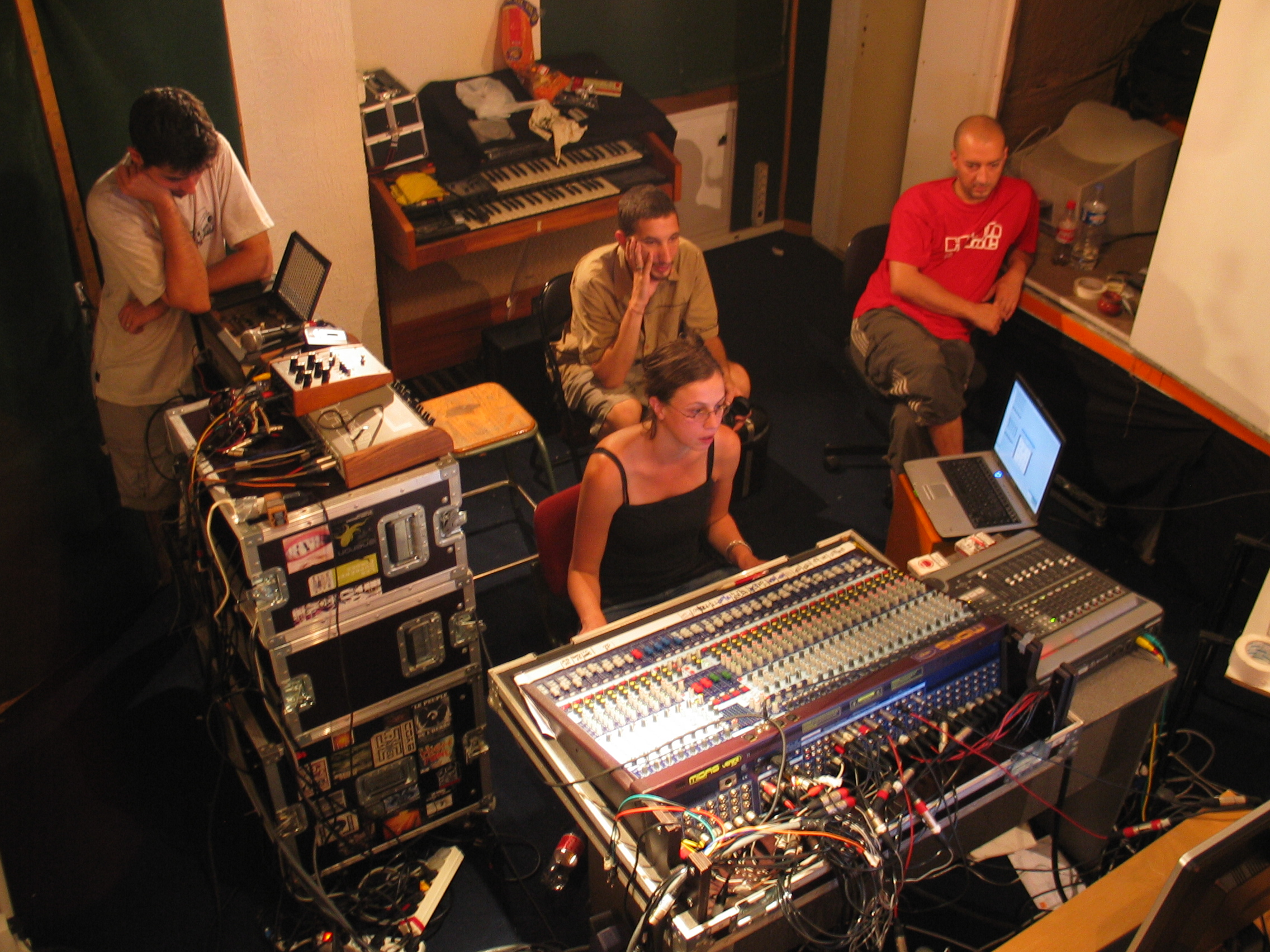
High Tone With Greg Aldea & Celine Frezza from "Studio de la Loge"

High Tone is a dub band from Lyon, France. Formed in 1997, the band came with an emergence of the French dub music Scene, with bands like Brain Damage, Kaly Live Dub, Le Peuple de l'Herbe, Improvisators Dub or Meï Teï Shô. Formed by five members, High Tone feeds their music with various influences, such as Drum'n'bass, Ambient, Trance, Vintage Dub with artists like King Tubby or Lee Perry. After a few self produced vinyl EPs, the band signed at the label Jarring Effects. High Tone members are now considered major actors in the French dub scene, and are known for numerous collaborations with other artists.

== Current line-up ==
- Aku Fen – guitar, samples
- Flaba Stone – bass guitar, synths
- Selecta Dino – drums
- DJ Twelve – scratches, samples
- Natural High – Keyboards

== Discography ==
- Opus Incertum (Jarring Effects, 2000)
- Bass Temperature (Jarring Effects, 2001)
- Acid Dub Nucleik (ADN) (Jarring Effects, 2002)
- Live (Jarring Effects, 2003)
- Kaltone: High Tone meets Kaly Live Dub (Jarring Effects, 2003)
- Higvisators: High Tone meets Improvisator Dub (Jarring Effects, 2004)
- Wave Digger (Jarring Effects, 2005)
- Wangtone: High Tone meets Wang Lei (Jarring Effects, 2005)
- Re-processed number 1 (Jarring Effects, 2005) (Remixes Album)
- Zentone: High Tone meets Zenzile (Jarring Effects, 2006)
- Underground Wobble (Jarring Effects, 2007)
- Dub Invaders (Jarring Effects, 2009)
- Out Back (Jarring Effects, 2010)
- High Damage: High Tone meets Brain Damage (Jarring Effects, 2012)
- Dub Invaders 2 (Jarring Effects, 2013)
- Ekphrön (Jarring Effects, 2014)
- Time Has Come (Jarring Effects, 2019)
