= The Mondrians =

Swiss indie rock band

- Origin: Monthey, Vevey; Switzerland
- Genres: Garage rock, Pop, Indie
- Years active: 2005 to Present
- Labels: Le Son du Maquis, Irascible
- Members: Maxime Antoine Martin; Alric Marchand; Louis Bernard Morisod; Laurent Kung
- Past members: Cedric Streuli

The Mondrians are a four-piece indie rock band from Switzerland. The band formed in the summer of 2005 after recording their first four-track home-made demo, including the songs "Pearl Of The Lake" and "The Shout."

Before recording an album, the Mondrians spent three years on the road, touring Switzerland, France, and the United Kingdom. They played in the Paléo and Eurockéennes festivals, among others, and opened for The Kooks in Zurich. In 2007, they recorded a high-quality demo in Bavois. In summer 2008, The Mondrians recorded their first album in Spain with producer Gordon Raphael. The Mondrians' album was released on November 5, 2009, and included the songs Reason to live, Fresh Music and Llew the kid.

In early 2010, Cedric left the band for his solo project, Buvette, and Laurent came on as the new drummer. In that summer, they played at the Café of the Montreux Jazz Festival. At this time, The Mondrians decided to stop playing live shows before recording new materials and 11 new songs were written for an up-coming album. In November 2011, the band released To The Happy Few only in Switzerland, with no label. The album was produced by Swiss producer and sound engineer Benjamin Bard, who had already been working with the band for several years as their live sound engineer. The album received generally good reviews from critics. Pat V from Überreel realised two short videos to announce the album and one for the promo of the song Rainbow.

In August 2014, the band is back in studio in Leysin to record new stuff with Benjamin Bard who produced the previous album, "To The Happy Few". The Mondrians finally mixed the tapes with Patrick Matthey who recorded their first home demo, "Reason To Live" in Bavois in 2007. New titled album "Avalanche" is released in October 2015 for the first time in vinyl and digital.

== Members ==
- Maxime – guitar, vocals
- Alric – guitar, keyboards, vocals
- Laurent – drums, keyboards, vocals
- Louis – bass, vocals

Old member:

- Cedric – drums, vocals (2004-2010 drummer)

== Discography ==
=== Demo recordings ===
- Pearl of the Lake (2005)
- Reason to Live (2006)
- Extra-time Monotony (2006)
- Bavois (2007)

=== Albums ===
- The Mondrians (2009)
- To the Happy Few (2011)
- Avalanche (2015)
