= The Mondrians (album) =

Studio album by The Mondrians
- Released: November 5, 2009
- Recorded: 2008 (Spain)
- Genre: Indie pop
- Length: 57:40
- Label: Le Son Maquis
- Producer: Gordon Raphael

The Mondrians chronology
Bavois (2007)	The Mondrians (2009)	To The Happy Few (2011)

The Mondrians is The Mondrians' debut album. It was released on November 5, 2009. The album was recorded in the summer of 2008, in Spain with Gordon Raphael.

== Production and release ==
The album was recorded in the summer of 2008 in Spain with producer Gordon Raphael, best known for his work with The Strokes. The extensive time lapse between the end of the recording and the album's release was probably due to the band's unsigned status, forcing them to find a distributor only after the album was finalized. It was ultimately released by Le Son Maquis, a French record label, on November 5, 2009.

The Mondrians performed two concerts on October 30 and 31 to support the album's release – one at the Bleu Lezard in Lausanne, the other in Martigny. They plan to tour Europe in support of the album.

== Track listing ==
All music is composed by The Mondrians

No.	Title	Length
1.	"Jesse James (the Gentle Borial of a Hero)"	3:06
2.	"Reason to Live"	3:37
3.	"Fresh Music"	2:51
4.	"I'm Not Like Everybody Else"	3:58
5.	"Sing It Aloud In the Country"	4:13
6.	"So What for Candide"	1:51
7.	"The Girl In the Movie"	2:51
8.	"Out of Bananas"	5:52
9.	"The Acrobat"	2:29
10.	"Llew the Kid"	3:37
11.	"Christmas On Your Window"	8:03
Total length:		57.4
