= Paul Cadieux =

Canadian film and television producer

Paul Cadieux is a Canadian film and television producer. He won the Genie Award for Best Motion Picture for The Triplets of Belleville (Les Triplettes de Belleville).

== Filmography ==
- Anatane: Saving the Children of Okura (2018) (executive producer)
- An Eye for an Eye (2016) (producer)
- Zixx Level One (2004) (executive producer)
- Les Triplettes de Belleville (2003) (co-producer)
- Beluga Speaking Across Time (2002) (executive producer)
- Mission banquise: le voyage immobile (2002) (co-producer)
- Oggy and the Cockroaches (2000–03) (executive producer)
- Rotten Ralph (1999) (executive producer)
- In Dreams: The Roy Orbison Story (1999)
- The Basque Whalers of Labrador (1985)
