= Chapelier Fou =

French musician (born 1984)

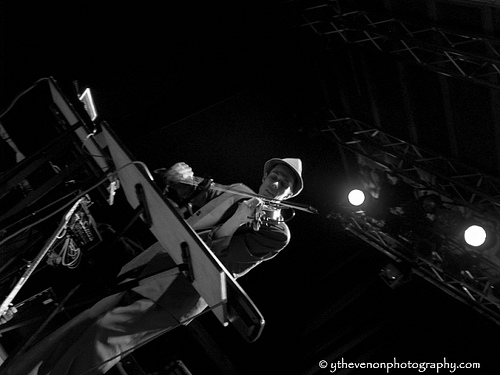
- Chapelier Fou performing in 2009

Background information
- Birth name: Louis Warynski
- Born: 6 January 1984 (age 41); Metz, France
- Genres: Electronic
- Occupation(s): Musician, songwriter
- Instrument: Multi-instrumentalist
- Years active: 2008–present
- Labels: Ici, d'ailleurs...
- Website: chapelierfoumusic.com/en

Louis Warynski (born 6 January 1984), better known by his stage name Chapelier Fou (Mad Hatter) is a French electronic musician from Metz. Since 2008, he has released five EPs and nine studio albums, all through the independent record label Ici, d'ailleurs...

== Life and career ==
Louis Warynski was born on 6 January 1984, in the French city of Metz. He entered the local conservatory at the age of six and went on to learn multiple instruments, including the violin and harpsichord. After graduating from high school, Warynski obtained a master's degree in musicology. He began working with electronic music, sampled lines by Lewis Carroll's Mad Hatter, and adopted the moniker as his stage name.

In 2008, Chapelier Fou performed at Printemps de Bourges, in the "Electro Discoveries" section. In 2009, the Nancy-based independent label Ici, d'ailleurs... released his first EP, Darling, Darling, Darling... That year, his performance at Eurockéennes de Belfort won him the Fabrice Ragris prize, awarded for young talent. His next EP, titled Scandale!, was released in November 2009. In 2010, the artist appeared at Les Francofolies de La Rochelle and later travelled to Hungary to perform at Sziget Festival, in Budapest. His debut full-length album, titled 613, came out in 2010.

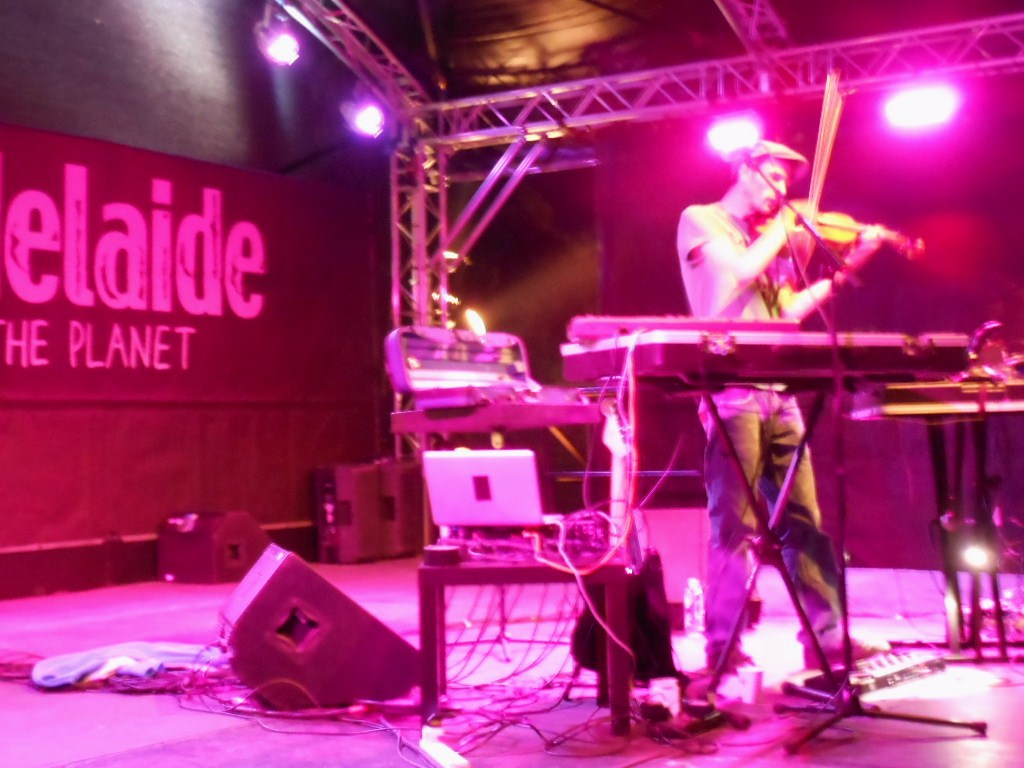
Chapelier Fou performing in 2012

In 2011, Chapelier Fou held a series of performances at the Centre Pompidou-Metz and later released the EP Al Abama. In 2012, he took part in the Celtic Connections music festival in Glasgow, Scotland. The same year, he travelled to Australia and New Zealand to play at WOMAD. His second studio album, Invisible, was released in March 2012. He promoted it with a number of shows across Europe, including at a Nuit Blanche in Paris. He returned to Australia for more performances the same year.

Chapelier Fou has since published the EPs Protest (2014) and Fuses (2015) as well as the full-length albums Deltas (2014), Kalia (2016), Muance (2017), ! (2017), Méridiens (2020), and Parallèles (2020).

Between 2014 and 2019, he performed with a group of musicians, including Maxime François (viola, synthesizers), Maxime Tisserand (clarinets, electronics), and Camille Momper (cello), before returning to a solo format in 2020.

In 2021, he formed the acoustic group Ensemb7e, which included Grégory Wagenheim (piano), Nicolas Stroebel (drums), Maxime Tisserand (clarinets), Camille Momper (cello), Maxime François (viola), and Marie Lambert (violin ). In 2021, Claire Moret replaced Momper. In 2022, the group released an eponymous studio album.

== Musical style ==
Chapelier Fou's compositions are mostly instrumental, combining acoustic instruments, including guitar and violin, with electronic instruments, synthesizers, and samplers. He began by sampling classical and world music, moving on to the use of acoustic instruments.

== Discography ==
Studio albums

- 613 (2010)
- Invisible (2012)
- Deltas (2014)
- Kalia (2016)
- Muance (2017)
- ! (2017)
- Méridiens (2020)
- Parallèles (2020)
- Ensemb7e (2022)

EPs

- Darling, Darling, Darling…' (2009)
- Scandale! (2009)
- Al Abama (2011)
- Protest (2014)
- Fuses (2015)
