= Two Tone Club =

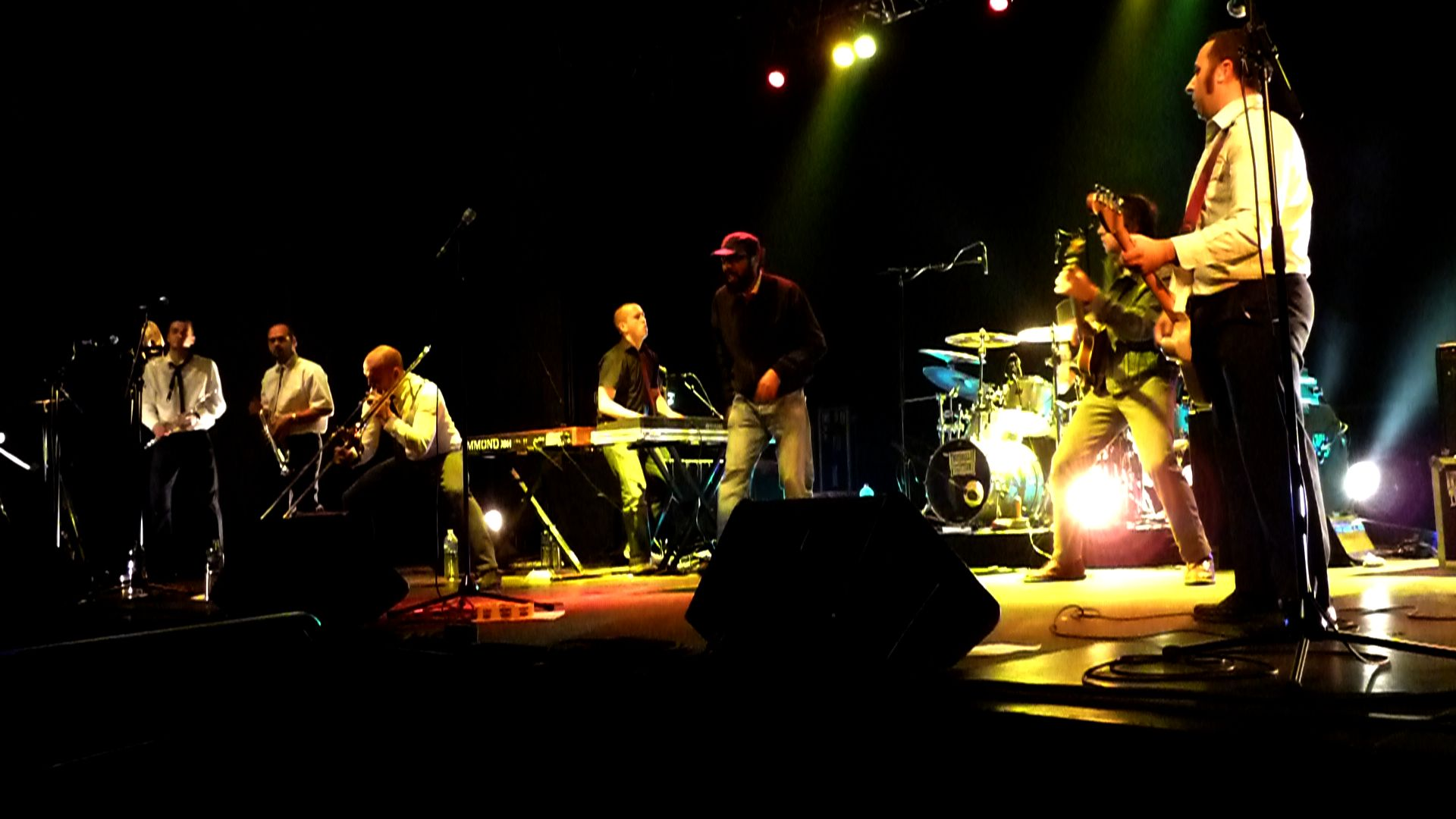
On stage.

Two Tone Club is a French ska band from Montbéliard. They are mainly influenced by 2 Tone ska, but also reggae and rocksteady. Their track "Club 69" pays homage to the roots of the skinhead movement.

The band released its debut studio album, Number 1, in 2002.

== Discography ==
- 2002 Number 1
- 2005 Turn Off (Big8Records/Grover)
- 2007 Now Is the Time
- 2018 Don't Look Back
