= Fabulous Trobadors =

Fabulous Trobadors are a band from Toulouse, France, founded in 1987. They have developed their own distinctive style based on Occitan folk music and the rhythms of northeastern Brazil.

Claude Sicre writes the lyrics and raps, while Ange B (real name Jean-Marc Enjalbert) raps and acts as a human beatbox, producing a wide range of sounds (beats, scratches, trumpet, guitar etc.) solely with his mouth.

Their first album, Èra pas de faire (In English, We shouldn't have done it), was released on Massilia Sound System's Roker Promocion label. Originally the lyrics to their songs were in the Occitan language, but they have since reached a wider audience with French-language lyrics.

They are noted for their political engagement, denouncing politicians such as Toulouse mayor Dominique Baudis, and particularly for their humour, wordplay, and constant puns. A major feature of their concerts is improvisation in the form of rap battles, verbal duels between the two rappers with each trying to outdo the other. These joutes verbales or duels de tchaches, as the band calls them, are inspired by the "tenson" of Occitan troubadours. The auditorium also forms part of the show, with numerous folk dances taking place.

The Fabulous Trobadors engage in their songs with the defence of cultural (notably Occitan) identity, decentralisation, and the fight against economic neoliberalism. Together with other artists they have promoted the idea of the Linha Imaginòt, an imaginary line linking like-minded people, towns and villages, "a symbol of a movement towards greater cultural democracy".

== Discography ==
- Èra pas de faire (1992)
- Ma Ville est le plus beau park (1995)
- On the Linha Imaginòt (1998)
- Duels de tchatche et autres trucs du folklore toulousain (2003)
