= Massilia Sound System =

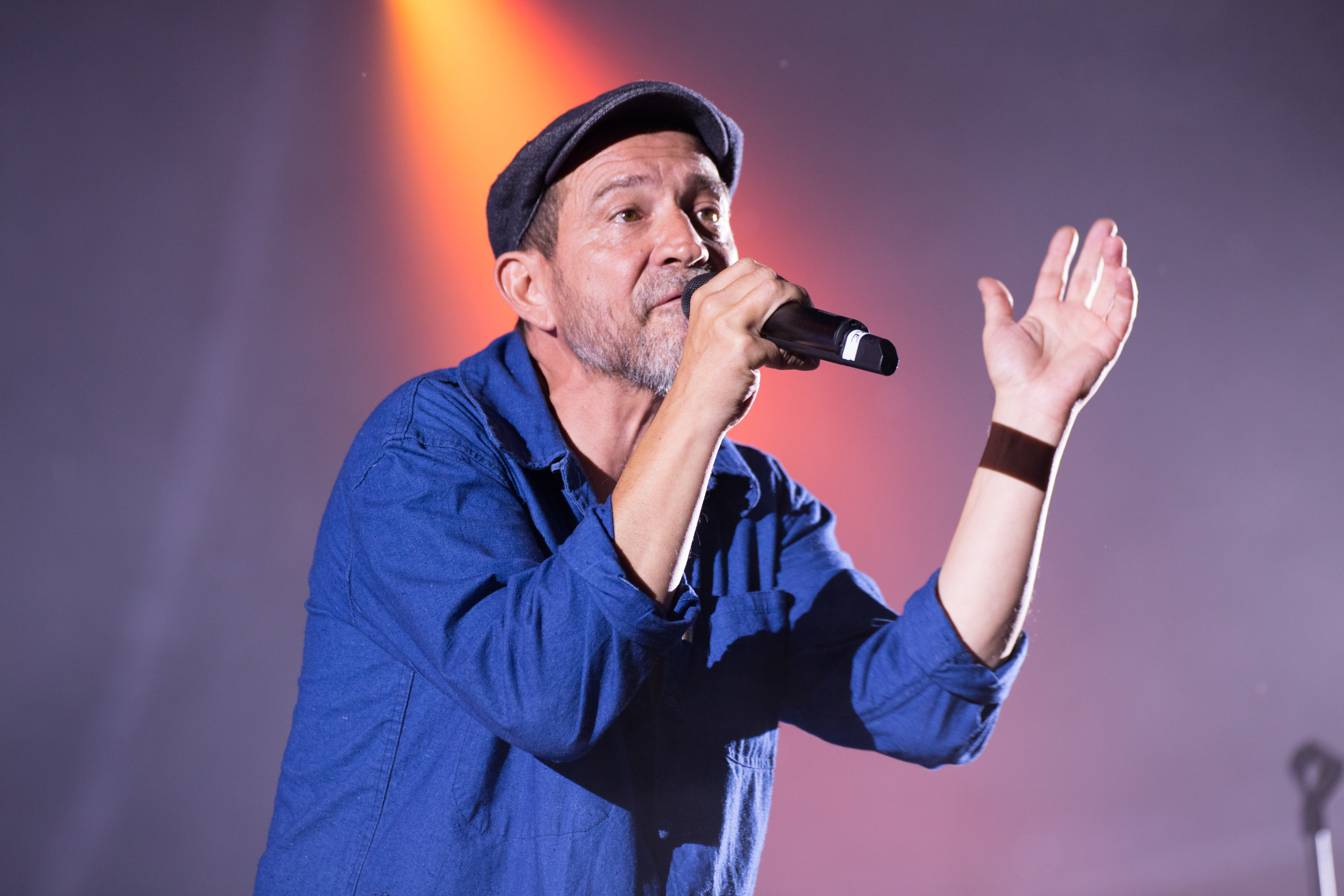
- Tatou, one of the singers of the band

Background information
- Origin: Marseille, Provence-Alpes-Côte d'Azur, France
- Genres: Reggae, ragamuffin, dancehall
- Website: massilia-soundsystem.com

Massilia Sound System is a French reggae band from Marseille, formed in the early 1980s.

== Musical style and politics ==
Band member Papet Jali has described the stylings of the band as including reggae, ragamuffin music, and dancehall music. The band's music has lyrics both in French and in Occitan, the traditional language of the region the band comes from. The band "promotes the conservation and vibrancy of [Occitan] and its dialects". Band member Tatou has said that the French government "still sees regional cultures that are not the language of the court of Versailles as exotic, folkloric, bizarre – cute but unimportant".

Their recent albums have incorporated more rock sounds, with deepening explorations into world music, such as the use of tabla, and make further incursions into drum and bass and hip-hop.

== History ==
The band was formed in the early 1980s, during a time of economic crisis in Marseille. In an interview with CNN, Papet Jali said that "The National Front with [Mr.] Le Pen came up strongly in Marseille, 28% in the local polls, which was shameful to us, and we reacted to that by singing." The band's name is derived from Massilia, the native Occitan name of Marseille. Their decision to sing in Occitan was inspired by hearing the music of Jamaicans singing in Jamaican Patois, which they admired as the Jamaicans "owning their heritage". Their debut album Parla Patois came out in 1992, and features lyrics relating to these themes.

Massilia Sound System re-popularized the city of Marseille in the 1990s, in conjunction with the success of Olympique de Marseille, the local soccer club. Intra-regional links were formed with other groups, such as Claude Sicre's Fabulous Trobadors in Toulouse, Les Nux Vomica in Nice, and other reggae groups using the culture and language of the region.

On 18 July 2008, Lux B, one of the singers of Massilia Sound System, died at the age of 47 after battling an illness for some time.

== Discography ==
- Rude et souple (demo cassette)
- Vive le PIIM (demo cassette)
- Parla Patois (1992)
- Chourmo (1993)
- Commando Fada (1995)
- On met le òai partout (live album) 1996)
- Aïolliwood (1997)
- Marseille London Experience (1999)
- 3968 CR 13 (2000)
- Occitanista (2002)
- Massilia fait tourner (live album) (2004)
- Òai e Libertat (2007)
- Massilia (2014)
- Sale Caractère (2021)
