= No One Is Innocent =

French rock band

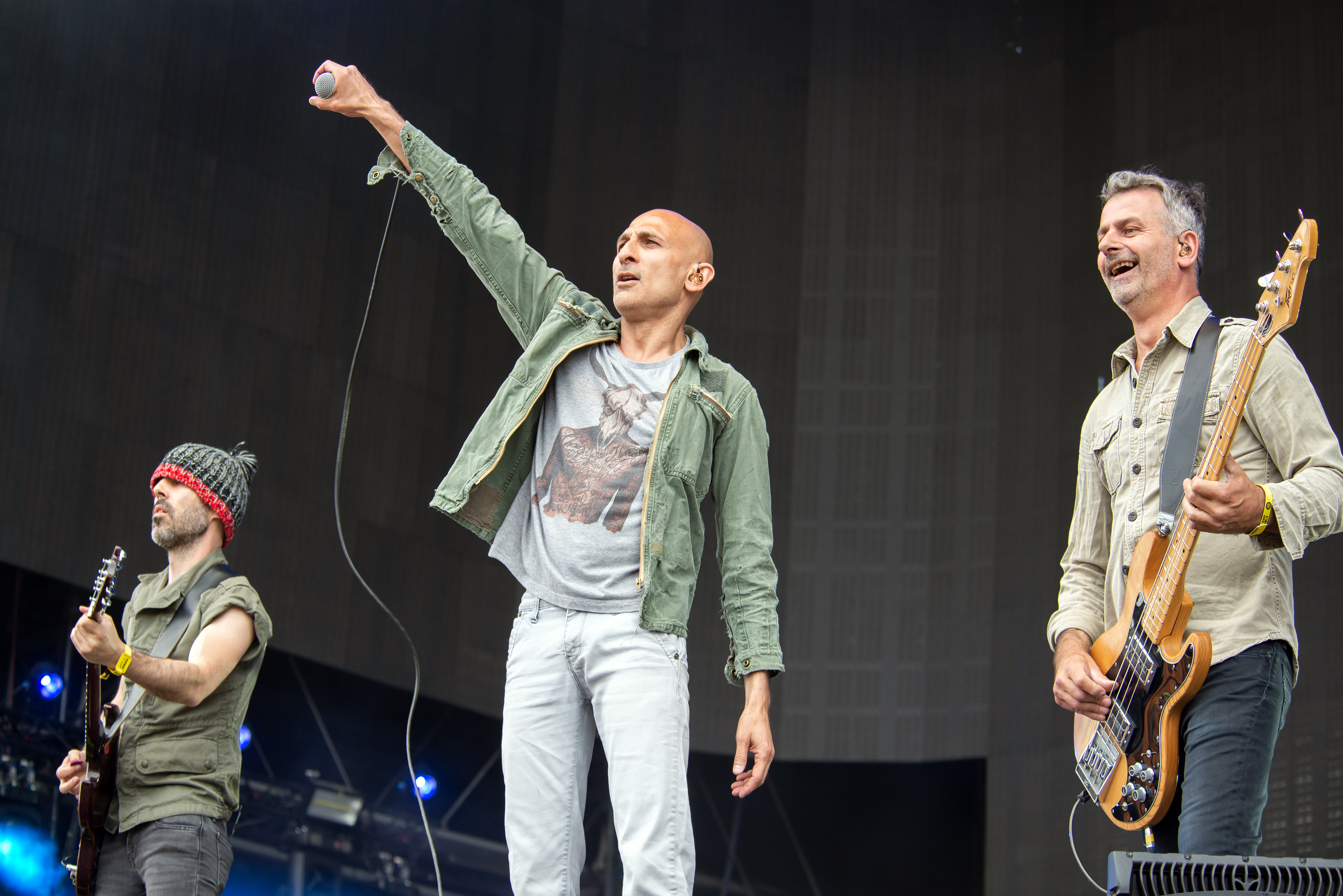
- No One Is Innocent at Hellfest 2019

Background information
- Origin: Paris, France
- Genres: Alternative metal, rap metal, funk metal, alternative rock
- Years active: 1994–present
- Labels: Island, Universal
- Members: Kémar Gulbenkian; Others: See formation section
- Website: nooneisinnocent.net

No One Is Innocent, stylized as [no one is innocent], is a French rock band originating from Paris featuring the French Armenian Kémar Gulbenkian as main vocalist. The band was established in 1994 charting with their 1994 hit "La peau". The band that saw a number of changes in its line-up has released five studio and two live albums.

== Formation ==
First formation

- Kémar Gulbenkian – vocals
- Jérome-David Suzat – bass, synthesizer, rhythm box, berimbau
- Thierry Molinier – drums
- Guy Perrot – 1st guitare
- Hakim Ouazad – guitar
- Matthieu Imberty – guitar
- David Defour – guitar
- Spagg – sampling

Second formation

- Kémar Gulbenkian – vocals
- Shanka (François Maigret) – guitar
- Djules (Julien Reymond) – bass
- Greg Jacks – drums
- Kmille – machines, production

Third formation

- Kémar Gulbenkian – vocals
- Shanka (François Maigret) – guitar
- Bertrand – bass
- Yann Coste – drums

Fourth formation

- Kémar Gulbenkian – vocals
- Shanka (François Maigret) – guitar
- Bertrand Dessoliers – bass
- Yann Coste – drums
- Ludovic Mazard – machines

== Discography ==
=== Albums ===
Studio albums

Year	Album	Peak positions	
Year	Album	FR	BEL (Wa)
1994	No one is innocent	–	–
1997	Utopia	17	–
2004	Revolution.com	23	97
2007	Gazoline	55	–
2011	Drugstore	113	–
2015	Propaganda	49	–
2018	Frankenstein	62	–
2021	Ennemis	74	–

Live albums

Year	Album	Peak positions
Year	Album	FR
2005	Suerte	91
2016	Barricades Live	98

=== Singles ===
Year	Album	Peak positions
Year	Album	FR
1994	"La peau"	32
