= The End of Time =

The End of Time may refer to:

== Film and TV ==
- The End of Time (2012 film), a 2012 Swiss-Canadian documentary
- The End of Time (2017 film)
- "The End of Time" (Doctor Who), a double episode of the Doctor Who television series.
- The End of Time, a three episode season finale in Power Rangers Time Force

== Music ==
- "End of Time" (Beyoncé song), 2011
- "End of Time" (Zara Larsson song), 2023
- "End of Time" (K-391, Alan Walker and Ahrix song), 2020
- "End of Time", a song by Gotthard from Homerun
- "End of Time", a song by Lindsey Buckingham from Seeds We Sow
- "End of Time", a song by Lacuna Coil from Dark Adrenaline
- "End of Time", a song by Motorhead from Aftershock
- "End of Time", a song by The Band Perry from Pioneer
- Quatuor pour la fin du temps (Quartet for the End of Time), composed by Olivier Messiaen

== Other uses ==
- The End of Time (book), 1999, non-fiction by Julian Barbour arguing that time is an illusion
- Ultimate fate of the universe, various scientific theories about the end of time in the universe
- A location in the video game Chrono Trigger

== See also ==
- End time (disambiguation)
- Year 2038 problem
- End of the world (disambiguation)
