= K2R Riddim =

- Origin: Cergy-Pontoise, France
- Genres: Reggae, dub
- Years active: 1992–2007
- Labels: Aïlissam Productions
- Members: Loïc; Lord Bitum; Dorothée; Tibo; Thierry; Christophe; Mano; Pat; Yvan; Meddhy

K2R Riddim is a French Reggae band from Cergy-Pontoise, France; who began their journey in Reggae/Dub/Ska music in 1992. K2R plays mostly reggae and Dub music; and primarily sing in French.

== Band members ==
- Loïc - Lead Vocals
- Lord Bitum - Lead Vocals
- Dorothée - Trumpet, Vocals
- Tibo - Guitars, Vocals
- Thierry - Bass, Double Bass
- Christophe - Saxophone, Flute
- Mano - Lead Drums
- Pat - Trombone
- Yvan - Drums
- Meddhy - Keyboards

== Discography ==
- K2 Airlines (2006)
- Bizness Classe (2006)
- Les Routes De 1 Indépendance (2005)
- Foule Contact (2005)
- Decaphonik (2004)
- Appel d'R (2001)
- Live (1999)
- Carnet de Roots (1998)
