= X-Vision =

Iranian electronics manufacturer

X.Vision
- Company type: Private
- Industry: Consumer Electronics
- Founded: 2008
- Headquarters: Tehran, Iran
- Products: Broad range
- Website: https://www.xvision.ir/

X.Vision (Persian ایکس.ویژن) is an Iranian consumer electronics manufacturer and a subsidiary of Maadiran Group.

== Regional markets ==
X.Vision's market is focused on the Middle East, primarily Iran.
