= Zaniboni =

Zaniboni is an Italian surname. Notable people with the surname include:

- Giuseppe Zaniboni (born 1949), Italian footballer
- Sergio Zaniboni (1937–2017), Italian comic artist and writer
- Tito Zaniboni, attempted assassin of Mussolini
