= For better or worse =

For better or worse, For better or for worse or For better, for worse may refer to:

- "For better for worse", a phrase from traditional English-language Christian marriage vows

== Film ==
- For Better, for Worse (1919 film), an American silent film
- For Better, for Worse (1938 film), a Swedish film
- For Better, for Worse (1954 film), a British film
- For Better, for Worse (1959 film), a Hong Kong film
- Honeymoon Academy (film), also titled For Better or for Worse, a 1990 film
- For Better or For Worse (1975 film) (Pour le meilleur et pour le pire), a Canadian comedy film
- For Better or For Worse (1993 film), a documentary
- For Better or Worse (film), a 1995 film

== Music ==
- For Better, or Worse, an album by John Prine
- Mood Muzik 3: For Better or for Worse, an album by Joe Budden
- "For Better or Worse" (song), a song by Debbie Gibson
- "For Better or Worse", a song from the Broadway play Jennie

== Other ==
- For Better, for Worse (play), a comedy play by Arthur Watkyn
- For Better or For Worse, a comic strip by Lynn Johnston
- "For Better or Worse", a comic strip by Tad Dorgan
- For Better or Worse, a book by Jane Cunningham Croly
- For Better or Worse (1959 TV series), an American soap opera
- For Better or Worse (2011 TV series), an American television series
- For Better or Worse (Big Love), an episode of the American TV series Big Love
- "For Better or for Worse" (Merseybeat), a 2001 television episode
- For Better or for Worse (radio series), a 1993–96 British radio series starring Gorden Kaye and Su Pollard

== See also ==
- For Better, For Worse, Forever, a novel by Lurlene McDaniel
