= Lofofora =

French metal band

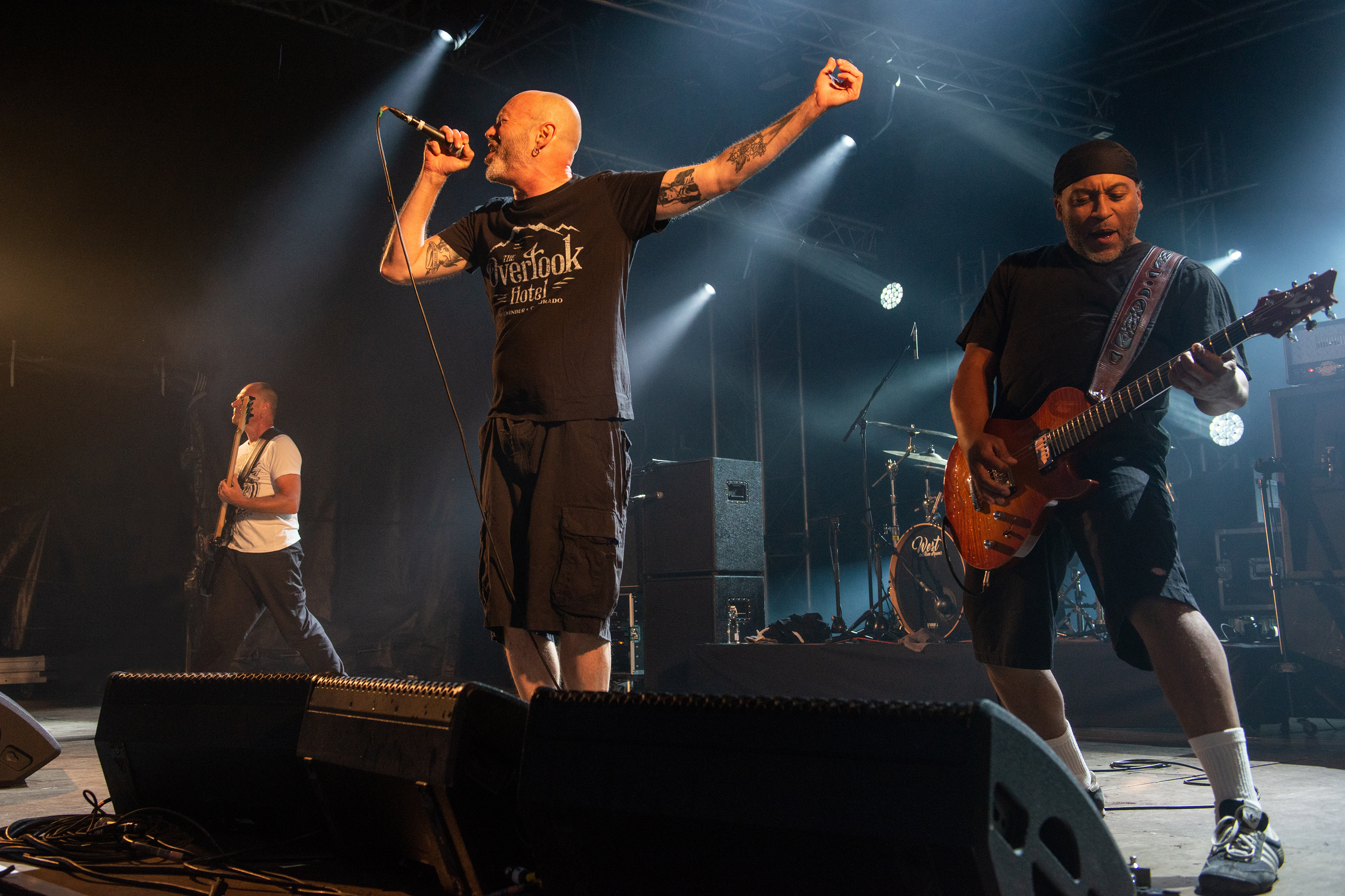
- Lofofora in 2021

Background information
- Origin: Paris, France
- Genres: Crossover metal; rap metal; hardcore punk; punk rock; heavy metal
- Years active: 1989-present
- Labels: Virgin (1994–1999), BMG (2001), M10 (2003), Sriracha Records (2004), At(h)ome (since 2005), Sriracha Sauce (1993–2006)
- Members: Reuno Wangermez; Phil Curty; Daniel Descieux; Vincent Hernault
- Website: www.lofofora.com

Lofofora is a French metal band from Paris. The band's name is taken from the peyote cactus' scientific name, Lophophora williamsii.

== History ==
Originating from the French alternative scene, Lofofora was formed in 1989 in Paris. The band has been considered one of the pioneering acts of the "crossover" (or "fusion") genre in France. Rooted in the punk subculture, their sound blends rap metal, hardcore punk, and heavy metal.

Lofofora's "target" is intolerance; Wangermez said, "Only sheep need a shepherd". They write songs of protest and denounce some of the failings of the French society. For example, the problems in the underdeveloped outskirts, the "hypocrisy of the politics of the French extreme right leagues", racism, liberalism, individualism, "stupidity" and the "colonization of minds by the media". Wangermez's lyrics, which he sang in his native language, are social chronicles, saying that he "fights to provoke thought or to stir up trouble. Hit the bull's-eye rather than shooting buckshot". Among their titles are "Buvez du cul" (English: "Drink from ass") and "No Facho".

Lofofora has participated at concerts to support the defense of the poorly housed people, undocumented migrants, AIDS orphans international and the anarchist federation. The band played concerts in France as well as in Belgium and Canada.

The Guardian and The Washington Post mentioned Lofofora in a feature about the French hardcore scene.

== Lineup ==
=== Current members ===
- Reuno Wangermez – vocals (1989–)
- Phil Curty – bass (1989–)
- Daniel Descieux – guitar (2001–)
- Vincent Hernault – drums (2009–)

=== Past members ===
- Karl – guitar (1989)
- Erik Rossignol – drums (1989–1992)
- Pascal Lalaurie – guitar (1990–1994)
- Edgar Mireux – drums (1992–2001)
- Farid Tadjene – guitar (1995–2001)
- Pierre Belleville – drums (2001–2009)

== Discography ==
- L'Oeuf (1993)
- Lofofora (1994) 5 tracks
- Lofofora (1995)
- Holiday in France (1995)
- Peuh! (1996)
- Dur Comme Fer (1999)
- K (1999) Single with Kabal (two songs)
- Double (2001) CD live + cover CD
- Le Fond Et La Forme (2003)
- Lames de Fond (2004) CD Live + DVD
- Les Choses Qui Nous Dérangent (2005)
- Mémoires de Singes (oct 2007)
- Monstre Ordinaire (2011)
- L'épreuve du contraire (2014)
- L'épreuve du concert (2015) CD live
- Simple Appareil (2018)
- Vanités (2019)
- Cœur de Cible (2024)
