= Les Infidèles =

- Origin: Lons-le-Saunier, France
- Genres: Rock
- Years active: 1990–1997; 2007–present
- Members: Jean Rigo; Jean-Cyril Masson; Jo Matiss; Fabrice Ragris
- Past members: Olivier Derudet; Annette Bailly

Les Infidèles is a French rock band, established in the early 1990s, disestablished in 1997 and reformed in 2007.

== History ==
The group was founded in Lons-le-Saunier (Jura, France). They published four albums from 1990 to 1997, and released fours singles. One of their songs, "Les Larmes des maux", was a hit in France, staying on the chart for 23 weeks. In 2007, after ten years of absence, they released a CD maxi named "Cirkus".

== Members ==
- Jean Rigo : guitar, vocals
- Olivier Derudet, replaced by Jean-Cyril Masson in 1997 : bass
- Jo Matiss : drums
- Annette Bailly, replaced by Fabrice Ragris in 1991 : keyboards

== Discography ==
=== Albums ===
- Rebelle (1990)
- Héritage (1993)
- Human Way of Life (1995)
- Ailleurs (1997)
- Turbulences (2010)

=== Singles ===
- "Rebelle" (1990) - #27 in France
- "Les Larmes des maux" (1992) - #9 in France
- "Comme une chatte" (1993)
- "Cirkus" (2007)
