= Pleymo =

French nu metal band

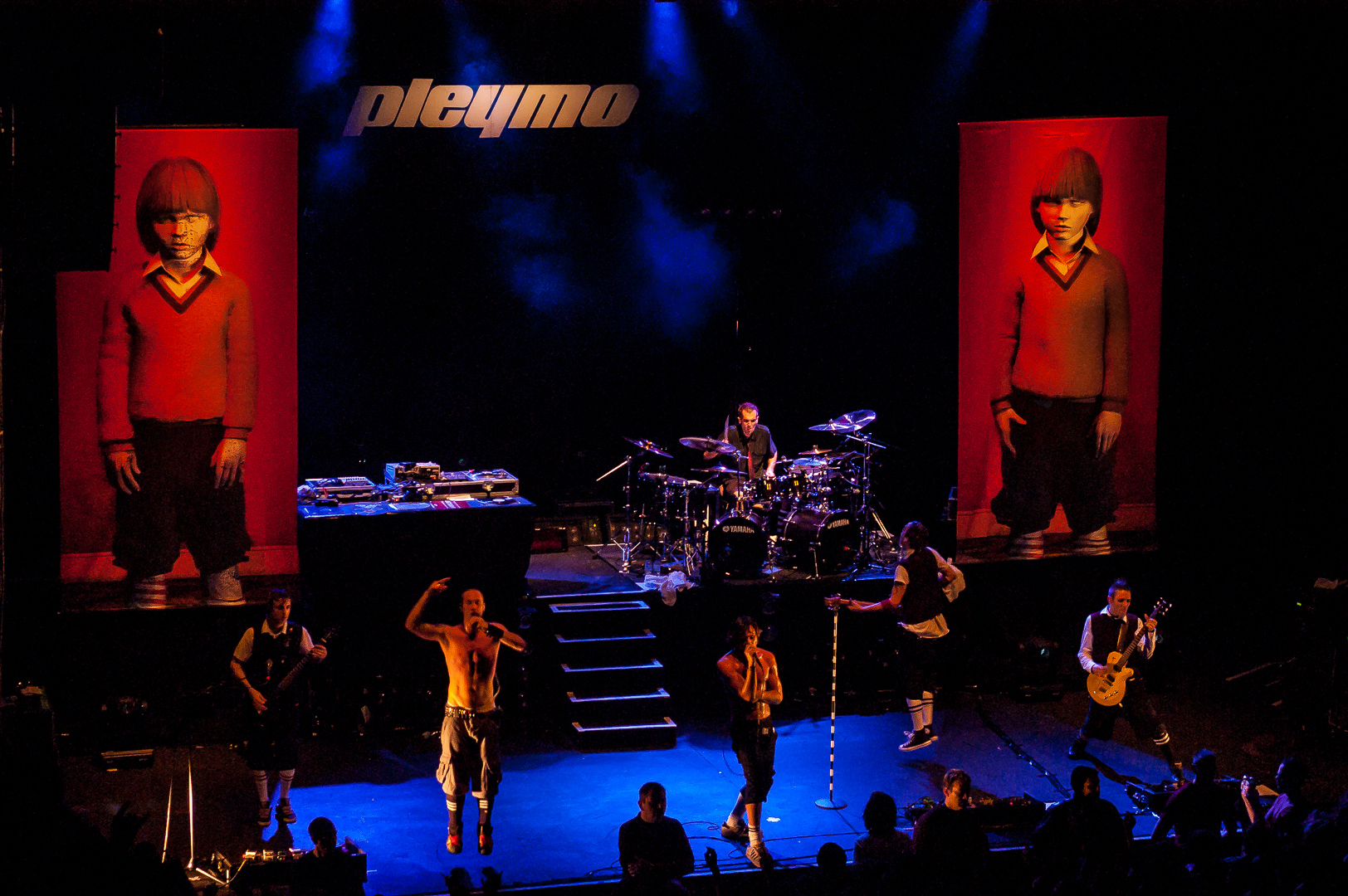
- Pleymo at the Olympia in 2004

Background information
- Origin: Paris, France
- Genres: Nu metal; rap metal; alternative metal
- Years active: 1997-2007; 2017–2018; 2026-present
- Members: Mark Maggiori; Erik De Villoutreys; Davy Portela; Benoît Julliard; Fred Ceraudo; Frank Bailleul
- Past members: Mathias Borronquet; Matthieu Gibson
- Website: www.pleymo.net

Pleymo is a French nu metal band formed by Mark Maggiori, Benoît Julliard, Fred Ceraudo, and Mathias Borronquet in Paris in 1997. Pleymo has sold over 100,000 albums to date. The band's name apparently originates from the lead singer once having a haircut as a child that was similar to that of Playmobil figures.

== History ==
=== Beginning, Keçkispasse? and record deal (1997–2000) ===
Pleymo started in 1997 under the name of "Pleymobill", but the name was eventually shortened to the name they have now when the band's lineup expanded to five due to the inclusion of turntablist DJ Frank (Frank Bailleul). The same year, Mathias, the guitarist at the time, exited the band and Erik De Villoutreys eventually replaced Mattias as the guitarist. Little by little the group was growing and then caught the attention of the producer Stéphane Kraemer. On 15 June 1999 they released their first album called Keçkispasse? signed to the label Wet Music.

Epic (a branch of Sony) offered the band a record deal in 2000.

=== Episode 2 : Medecine Cake (2001–2002) ===
In 2002, they released Episode 2: Medecine Cake, produced by Fabrice Leyni. Sales of Pleymo's second album topped the 50,000 mark, establishing the band as a major new French band. In August 2002, Pleymo went on to perform at the Summer Sonic Festival in Tokyo and also in Osaka, sharing the stage with major international stars such as The Offspring and No Doubt. With this, they were already well known in Belgium, Luxembourg, Switzerland, UK and also Japan (where they played a lot of concerts in 2002 and 2004). They also released an English version of this album, called Doctor Tank's Medicine Cake, with English lyrics.

In November 2002 the group released a six-track "(Ep)Live", recorded at Les Eurockéennes festival in Belfort.

=== Rock (2003–2004) ===
Their third album title, Rock, announced a major change of musical direction, with greater emphasis on melody and vocals. The members of the group stated that this third album was influenced by the work of bands like Pink Floyd and The Smashing Pumpkins. Rock is a concept album about a blind four-year-old boy and his imaginary double.

Sales of Rock topped the 50,000 mark in France and 18,000 in Japan. Pleymo were nominated in the "Best Pop/Rock Album of the Year" category at the "Victoires de la musique" Awards. Some of the band's older fans felt alienated at the perceived change in direction and sound.

In September 2004 recorded a duet with teen pop'n'rock idols Kyo, resulting in the single "On ne changera rien".

=== Alphabet Prison and hiatus (2005–2007) ===
On 9 October 2006 they returned with Alphabet Prison, an album that encompasses all that they have done until that date, and has slower and calm songs (Un parfum nommé 16 ans) and heavier songs (Zéphyr, Blockout).

In 2007, they announced that they were going on hiatus. Mark confirmed that in a concert. Mark was going to Los Angeles, where he was going to film a movie. Franck was going to the EUA to promote his brand Kill. Benoît was going to play in a new group called Empyr, that has members from Watcha, Vegastar and the former singer of Kyo. Fred was also going to play in a new group called Hewitt. Davy was to continue in the group Enhancer.

In 2008, the song "New Wave" from Medecine Cake was released as a downloadable track for the game Rock Band.

=== 20-year anniversary tour (2017–2018) ===
On 29 March 2017 Pleymo announced their reformation for a Pleymo Revival Tour celebrating the band's 20th anniversary. The first reunion show took place on 9 March 2018 in their native France. On 23 February 2018 the group released a limited edition vinyl. 500 copies will be sold out in less than 48 hours.

=== Reunification and new album (2026-) ===
On the 18th of february 2026 the band announce their comeback and that they are working on a new album.

== Influences ==
Their influences range from Rage Against the Machine to bands like Korn, Deftones and Primus.

== Members ==
=== Current members ===
- Mark Maggiori(Kemar) - lead vocals (1997-2007, 2017–present), Blue.
- Erik De Villoutreys (Riko) - guitars (1998-2007, 2017–present), Green.
- Davy Portela (Vost) - guitars (1999-2007, 2017–present), Yellow.
- Benoît Juillard (B1) - bass guitar (1997-2007, 2017–present), Red.
- Fred Ceraudo (Burns) - drums (1997-2007, 2017–present), White.
- Franck Bailleul (Kefran) - turntables, vocals (1998-2007, 2017–present), Black.

The nicknames and colors attribute to the "Medecine Cake" era.

=== Former members ===
- Mattias Borronquet - guitars (1997-1998)
- Matthieu Gibson - guitars (1998)

== Discography ==
- Keçkispasse? (1999)
- Episode 2: Medecine Cake (2002)
- Rock (2003)
- Alphabet Prison (2006)

== Videography ==
- Ce Soir C'est Grand Soir (2005, Live, Double DVD)

== Videoclips (music videos) ==
- Blöhm (2000)
- New Wave (2001)
- United Nowhere (2002)
- Divine Excuse (2003)
- Rock (2003)
- On Ne Changera Rien (2004)
- Moddadiction (2004)
- Adrenaline (2006)
- L'instinct et l'envie (2006)
