= Mark Maggiori =

French-American artist

- Born: June 16, 1977 (age 49); Fontainebleau, France
- Education: Académie Julian; Lycée International François-Ier
- Known for: Painting (oil) and Music
- Movement: Western art
- Spouse: Petecia Le Fawnhawk Maggiori
- Awards: William B. Travis Awards for Patrons Choice, 2016; Sam Houston Awards for Best Painting, 2017; Don B. Huntley Spirit of the West Award, 2018 and 2019
- Website: markmaggiori.com

Mark Maggiori (born June 16, 1977) is a French painter, graphic designer, draftsman, musician, music video director and lead vocalist of the nu metal band Pleymo. He is noted for paintings of American cowboys, Native Americans and the American Southwest.

== Early life and education ==
Maggiori was born in Fontainebleau in 1977. His father is Robert Maggiori, a French philosopher and journalist. At the age of 15, during his first visit to the United States, Maggiori went on a month-long road trip from New York City to San Francisco and visited several National Parks and other sites in the Southwestern United States. He later cited that trip as the beginning of his fascination with the Southwest and the inspiration behind his Western art.

Maggiori graduated from the Académie Julian in Paris, where he was formally trained in academic drawing.

== Music ==
From 1997 to 2007, Maggiori served as the lead vocalist, graphic designer, and music video director for his band, Pleymo. After signing with Epic Records the band released four studio albums and toured internationally. Pleymo went on a hiatus after 2007, but reunited in 2018 with Maggiori once again providing lead vocals. After the reunion tour announcement for the Paris concert the band had sold out Le Trianon in Paris in less than a day.

=== List of Pleymo music videos ===
- 2002 : « New Wave » (Episode 2 : Medecine Cake)
- 2002 : « United Nowhere » (Episode 2 : Medecine Cake)
- 2003 : « Divine Excuse » (Rock)
- 2004 : « Modaddiction » (Rock)
- 2004 : « On ne changera rien » (Rock [réédition])
- 2005 : « Rock » (Rock)
- 2006 : « Adrenaline » (Alphabet Prison)
- 2007 : « L'instinct et l'Envie » (Alphabet Prison)

=== Other music Videos ===
- 2008 : Like A Hobo de Charlie Winston
- 2009 : Apprends-Moi de Superbus
- 2010 : Laisse Aller de Vadel
- 2010 : I Love Your Smile de Charlie Winston
- 2010 : Help Myself (Nous ne faisons que passer) de Gaetan Roussel
- 2010 : Mes défauts de Superbus
- 2010 : La Vengeance d'une Louve de Brigitte
- 2010 : Ma Benz de Brigitte (Cover de NTM)
- 2010 : Battez-vous de Brigitte
- 2011 : I love you, mais encore des Starliners
- 2011 : This is a love song de Lilly Wood & The Prick
- 2012 : Drama Queen de Vadel
- 2012 : Des mots invincibles de Leslie
- 2013 : Paranoïak de Seth Gueko
- 2014 : Comment faire des Plastiscines

== Fine art ==
Maggiori began painting Western scenes in 2014. Since then, his works have been featured in Forbes, Flaunt, Art of the West, Southwest Art, Western Horseman and others. Maggiori has been noted in particular for the way he paints clouds in his landscape scenes, with Christopher Barker describing them as, "layered, textural monuments that both dwarf and magnify the subject with impossible detail."

In addition to published features, Maggiori's paintings have been exhibited in the Briscoe Western Art Museum in San Antonio, the Eiteljorg Museum of American Indians and Western Art in Indianapolis, the Autry Museum of the American West and the Maxwell Alexander Gallery in Los Angeles. In 2021, Maggiori exhibited paintings at the Couse-Sharp Historic Site in Taos, New Mexico.

Beginning in 2017, he began to work en plein air in New Mexico, Arizona and Wyoming. Maggiori's style and technique has drawn comparisons to Western artists Frederic Remington and Frank Tenney Johnson. Gallery owner Beau Alexander has noted that Maggiori's paintings are unique because of his outside perspective, having not grown up in the culture of the West and that "[He] goes to great lengths to have the cowboys depicted accurately...he will use colors and techniques learned in his photo and film days to create a more dramatic scene."

Maggiori moved to Taos, New Mexico in 2019 and created the Taos Pueblo Art Education Fund in 2021, which raises money for the Taos Day School's art programs.

== Personal life ==
Mark Maggiori was married to French singer-songwriter Aurélie Saada from 2000 to 2012, with whom he has two children. In 2012 he married American artist and designer Petecia Le Fawnhawk. The couple have a daughter together. His father is the French philosopher and literary critic Robert Maggiori.

== Controversies ==
In the early 2000s, Mark Maggiori worked on the visual development of Anatane: Saving the Children of Okura, an animated series openly inspired by Japanese animation. The project was created in collaboration with the French public broadcaster France 2 and the production company Les Films de la Perrine. Although development began in the early 2000s, the series was not broadcast until much later, airing in Canada in 2018 and in France in 2019.

In 2004, while the series was still in preproduction, the French animation website Catsuka published a report accusing Maggiori of plagiarizing background artwork from Studio Ghibli films. The images in question appeared in publicly accessible presentation materials used to pitch the project to broadcasters and potential funders, such as France 2 and the CNC. These materials were available online at the time, including on portfolio websites and production company pages.

These visuals were not included in the final series. However, they were used during the project's promotional phase to present Anatane as an original animated series. According to Maggiori, the illustrations were intended as placeholders. He also stated that during a visit to Studio Ghibli, he showed the images to Hayao Miyazaki, co-founder of the studio and one of Japan’s most renowned animation directors, and that Miyazaki reportedly reacted with amusement. The visuals were later removed from his portfolio.

Catsuka further reported that Maggiori’s earlier works — including his graduation film, several album covers, and a short film titled Pop made for French pop singer Pascal Obispo — featured visuals resembling Japanese anime and manga styles.

As a result of the controversy, the neologism maggiorisme emerged on French-speaking anime and design forums, where it has occasionally been used as a colloquial term for artistic plagiarism. Though informal, its appearance in multiple discussions reflects how the case resonated within parts of the animation community.
