= Meï Teï Shô =

French band

Meï Teï Shô is a French music band playing jazz, afrobeat, and dub.

== Band's name ==
Mei tei shō (酩酊症)

This Japanese term describes the trance-like state that follows the ingestion of too much rice. That's what the band is trying to obtain with their music: evolutive and repetitive.

== Musical description ==
Meï Teï Sho is a music to listen to as well as a music to dance to. It is the fruit of a multitude of cultures, reflected in the languages used, the lyrics, the style, the energy and the musicians themselves. Based on a repetitive pattern, the musicians add improvisations, instrumentals and vocals, producing this energetic musical style.

== Biography ==
=== Members ===
- Bruce Sherfield : singing
- Eric Teruel : Fender Rhodes
- Jean-Phi Chalte : machines
- Germain Samba : drums
- Boris Kulenovic : Bass guitar

== Discography ==
- Maxi (2000)
- Xam Sa Bop (2001)
- Live (2002)
- Remix mini LP (2002)
- Lô Bâ (2004)
