= Mr. J. Medeiros =

American rapper

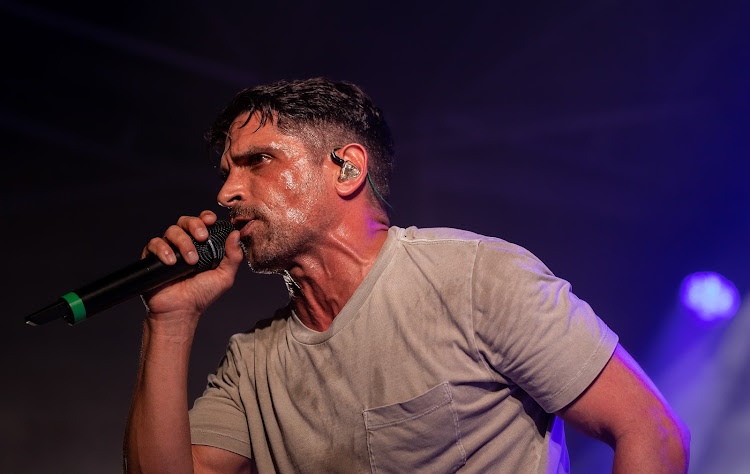
- Medeiros performing in 2017

Background information
- Also known as: Mr. J.
- Born: Jason Christopher Medeiros; Colorado Springs, Colorado, U.S.
- Genres: Hip hop, rock, electronic
- Occupations: Rapper, record producer, singer, songwriter
- Years active: 1998–present
- Labels: Basementalism, Rawkus, De Medeiros, Yotanka, On and On
- Website: mrjmedeiros.com

Jason Christopher Medeiros, professionally known as Mr. J. Medeiros, is an American rapper, record producer, and songwriter. He is a founding member of the hip hop group The Procussions, the vocalist in the electronic hip hop duo AllttA, and the frontman of the rap-rock band thebandknives.

== Music career ==
=== Beginnings (1996–1999) ===
Medeiros began his career in Colorado Springs' battle-rap and b-boy scenes. His first release was "Equipped", recorded as a member of Th'Jiggees for Blow Up the Spot, a compilation associated with The Spot, a Denver youth center whose music program served at-risk youth.

His first recording under the name Mr. J. Medeiros was "The Life of Brian", produced by Noel Zancanella. The song was later included as a bonus track on The Procussions' Japanese release Up All Night.

Medeiros's involvement in Colorado's battle-rap and b-boy scenes led to the formation of The Procussions, which brought together members of two local b-boy crews.

=== The Procussions (1998–2008; 2012–2014) ===
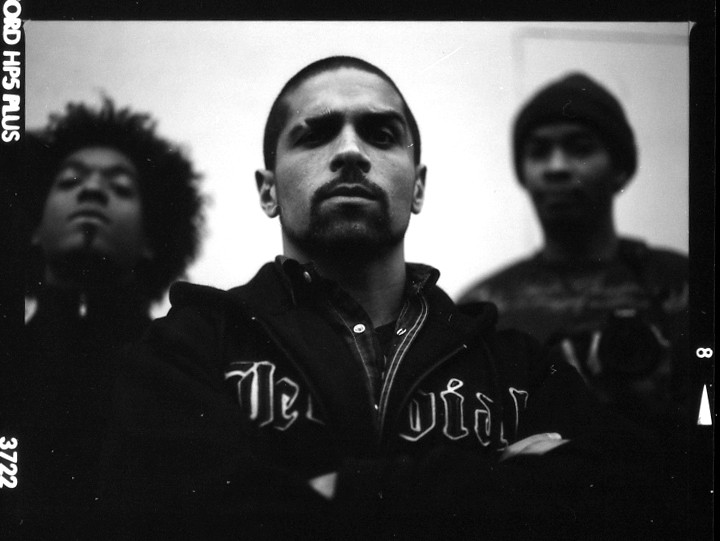
The Procussions: Stro Elliot, Rez, and Mr. J. Medeiros

The Procussions formed in Colorado Springs, Colorado, in 1998 from members of the local b-boy crews SOL and TSF. The original lineup consisted of Mr. J. Medeiros, Stro Elliot, Rez (originally Resonant), Qq, and Vise Versa, with DJ Vajra serving as the group's DJ. Qq later stopped performing after being diagnosed with multiple sclerosis.

During their early years, the group performed with artists including Run-D.M.C., The Pharcyde, De La Soul, and The Roots. They independently released the 12-inch singles "All That It Takes" and "Leave Her Alone." "All That It Takes" was distributed by ABB Records and reached the top ten on the CMJ national hip-hop chart.

The group subsequently relocated to Los Angeles. Vise Versa later left and formed Deux Process. In 2003, The Procussions released their debut album, As Iron Sharpens Iron, independently through Bassmentalism Records. The album reached No. 5 on the CMJ hip-hop chart. Their jazz-influenced EP Up All Night was released exclusively in Japan in 2004.

The group's collaborations with the French hip-hop group Hocus Pocus included "Hip Hop?" from 73 Touches and "Vocab!" from Place 54; the latter album was certified gold in France. Medeiros also appeared on "You" from 73 Touches, while Medeiros and Stro Elliot appeared on "Signes des Temps" from 16 Pièces.

In 2006, The Procussions became the first act signed to the relaunched Rawkus Records. Their second album, 5 Sparrows for 2 Cents, was the label's first release following its relaunch. The album included "Miss January", featuring Talib Kweli, and reached No. 8 on the Billboard Heatseekers Albums chart.

Following the album's release, the group headlined the Storm Tour alongside Aceyalone, Ugly Duckling, ¡Mayday!, and Wrekonize , followed by festival appearances outside the United States.

In a 2006 interview, Medeiros recalled that Ali Shaheed Muhammad personally invited The Procussions to tour after seeing them perform at the Brooklyn Hip-Hop Festival. The group subsequently joined A Tribe Called Quest and Rhymefest on the 2K Sports Bounce Tour, which marked A Tribe Called Quest's reunion after an eight-year hiatus.

Rez left the group in 2007 and returned to graphic design. Medeiros and Stro Elliot announced the end of The Procussions in January 2008.

Medeiros and Elliot reunited as The Procussions in 2012 and released the self-titled album The Procussions in 2013. It featured appearances by Shad, ¡Mayday!, 20syl, and trumpeter J. Kyle Gregory, and was released through Yotanka in Europe. Pro-Exclusive followed in 2014.

In 2017, Stro Elliot joined The Roots and began appearing with the band on The Tonight Show Starring Jimmy Fallon.

=== Solo career (2007–present) ===
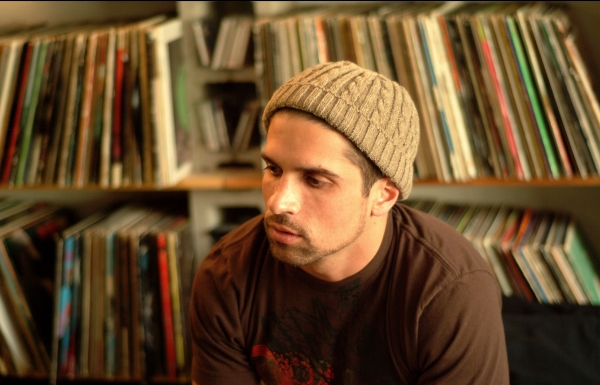
Mr. J. Medeiros in the studio

Medeiros released his debut solo album, Of Gods and Girls, through Rawkus Records in 2007. He produced four of the album's tracks, including "Constance", which addresses child sexual exploitation and human trafficking. The album received ratings of four-and-a-half out of five from HipHopDX, Okayplayer, and AllHipHop.

In 2009, he released The Art of Broken Glass and the album Friends Enemies Apples Apples, the latter produced by Stro Elliot.

Medeiros released Saudade in 2011. The video for its lead single, "Neon Signs", won the mtvU Freshman Video Challenge and was added to the channel's rotation.

His 2012 EP Pale Blue Dot included a remix of the title track produced by 20syl and featuring Shad. The remix won the Rap/Hip-Hop Performance category at the 2013 International Portuguese Music Awards.

His subsequent solo releases included The Rockies EP in 2013 and the album Milk and Eggs in 2016.

In 2017, Medeiros collaborated with French electronic producer Møme on the single "Let's Go". The collaboration was followed by the EP No Singles, released in 2019.

=== thebandknives ===
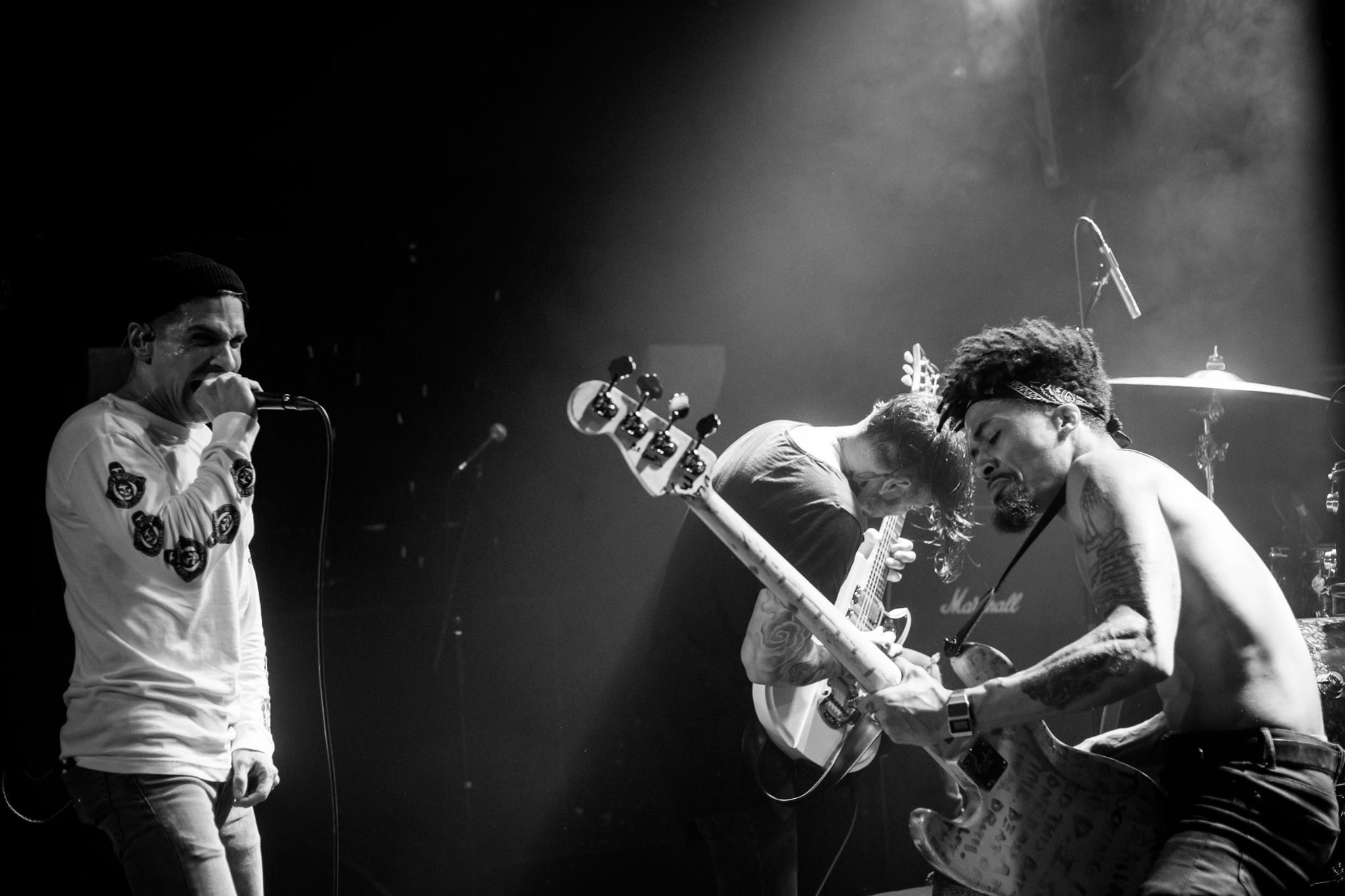
thebandknives performing live

Medeiros was the vocalist of the rap-rock band thebandknives, formed with guitarists Tim Stewart and Ricky Tillo. Stewart and Tillo were also members of Lady Gaga's touring band.

The band released its debut album, KNIVES, in 2018, followed by 11110 in 2019. KNIVES featured guest vocals from Mike Muir of Suicidal Tendencies. Its personnel included keyboardist Monte Neuble, guitarists Stewart and Tillo, bassist Jonny Goood, and drummers George "Spanky" McCurdy, Aaron Spears, Thomas Pridgen, and Chris Johnson .

Material for 11110 was developed while members of the band were touring with Lady Gaga.

=== AllttA (2015–present) ===
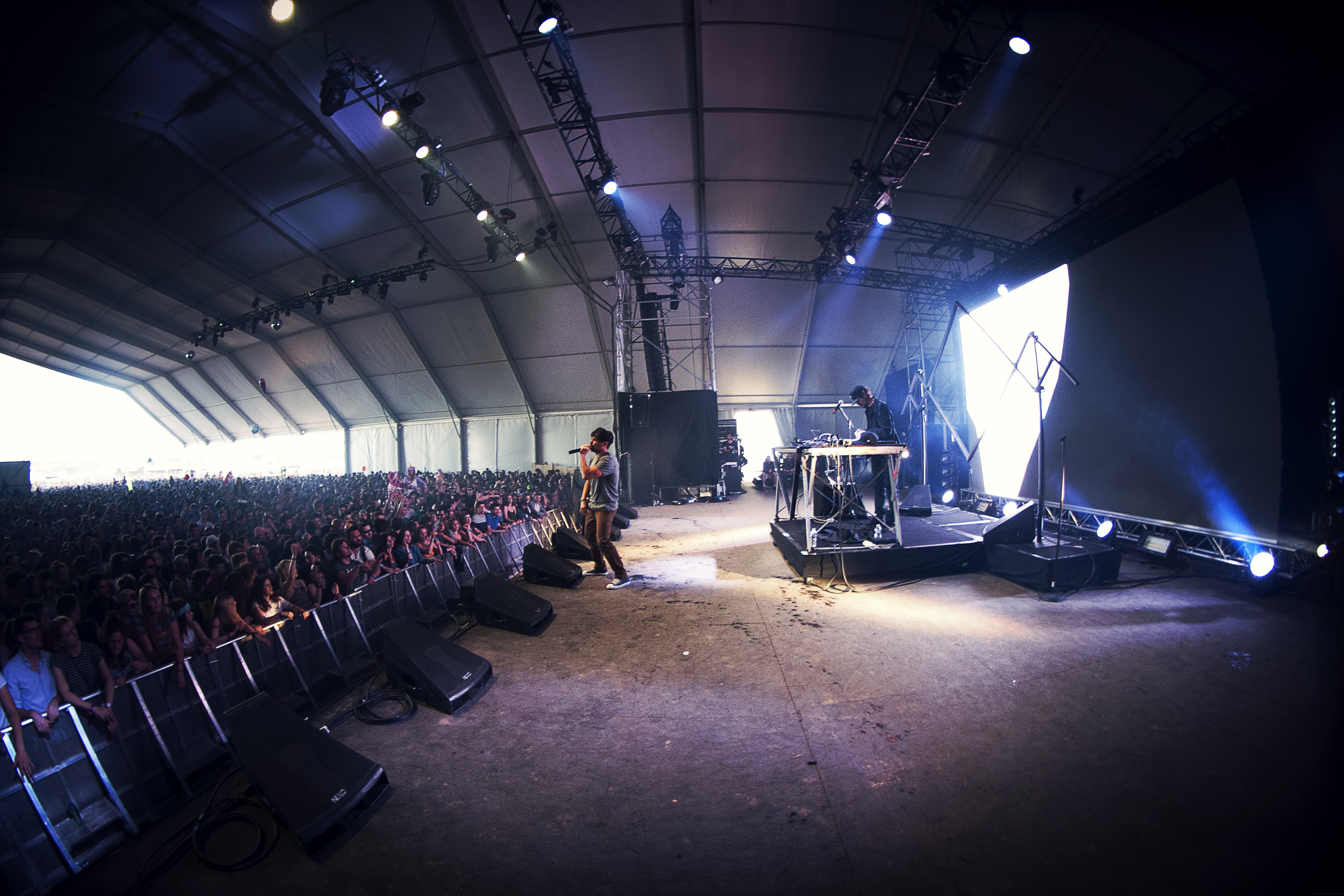
AllttA live at Solidays Festival

==== The Upper Hand and Facing Giants (2015–2017) ====
In 2015, Mr. J. Medeiros and 20syl formed the electronic hip hop duo AllttA, with 20syl as producer and Medeiros on vocals. Their first single, "Connery", was released in May 2016 through the Jakarta Records compilation Spring in Jakarta.

AllttA released their debut album, The Upper Hand, followed by Facing Giants. During this period, the duo played more than 100 live dates, including appearances at European festivals such as Vieilles Charrues, Solidays, and the Festival Internacional de Benicàssim.

==== "Savages" and artificial intelligence (2023) ====
In March 2023, AllttA attracted international attention with an experimental version of "Savages" that used artificial intelligence to synthesize the voice of rapper Jay-Z. Medeiros wrote the lyrics and performed the underlying vocal, which was transformed using an AI voice model and further processed by 20syl.

The experiment received widespread international coverage during the early emergence of AI voice synthesis in hip hop. The excerpt received nearly five million views on Twitter and was covered by publications including The New Yorker, Rolling Stone, Vibe, XXL, Complex, and Le Parisien.

Jay-Z's longtime engineer Young Guru publicly responded to the track, expressing concern about the implications of AI systems reproducing an artist's voice without permission and the need to protect artists' rights. Coverage of the track also addressed questions surrounding artificial intelligence, voice replication, and artists' rights in music.

The AI version of "Savages" was not commercially released. A version featuring Medeiros's original vocals, without the AI-generated Jay-Z voice, was subsequently released commercially.

==== Curio Parts I and II (2023) ====
In 2023, AllttA returned with the two-part Curio project, releasing Curio Part I in May followed by Curio Part II later that year. A special double-vinyl edition combining the two parts was limited to 100 numbered and signed copies and featured a multi-level embossed cover.

The duo toured in support of Curio in 2023 and performed at the Élysée Montmartre in Paris on November 29. Tsugi subsequently published a live report from the Élysée Montmartre performance.

AllttA's music has also been frequently featured in videos by American technology YouTuber Marques Brownlee, who has included multiple tracks by the duo in his MKBHD music playlists.

=== Film work ===
In 2024, Medeiros contributed to the soundtrack of the Netflix series Fiasco. He co-wrote and performed on "FIASCO BANGER – Générique Fin", released by Netflix Music as part of the series soundtrack.

Medeiros also wrote and performed "Independent" with Just Killed A Man for Pendant ce temps sur Terre, directed by Jérémy Clapin.

=== Collaborations ===
Medeiros has worked on collaborative projects outside his solo career and primary groups.

In 2018, he formed The Cutlery with French producers Blanka and Tigerz. The trio released the self-titled EP The Cutlery, featuring tracks including "Filet Mignon", "Reign Rain", "Loch Ness", and "La La Land". Music from the project was subsequently used in videos by technology YouTuber Marques Brownlee; his MKBHD music playlist includes "Filet Mignon" and "Reign Rain", while "Loch Ness" was used as the intro music for his review of the Samsung Galaxy S10e.

In 2023, Medeiros formed Mais Oui with Swiss producer GRAMM. The duo combines elements of funk, nu-disco, hip hop and electronic music. Their debut album, Ego Go Pop, was released through Archipel Records in May 2023. Mais Oui subsequently toured France alongside the French band Deluxe.

Medeiros has also appeared on recordings across several genres, collaborating with artists including film composer Éric Serra, hip hop producer Symbolyc One, indie-funk group Deluxe, electronic musician Thylacine, French electro-hip hop group La Fine Équipe, and electro-swing group Caravan Palace, for which he has also contributed as a songwriter.

== Discography ==
- 2003 The Procussions As Iron Sharpens Iron
- 2004 The Procussions Up All Night (Japanese Exclusive)
- 2006 The Procussions 5 Sparrows for 2 Cents
- 2007 Mr. J. Medeiros Of Gods and Girls
- 2009 Mr. J. Medeiros The Art of Broken Glass EP
- 2009 Mr. J. Medeiros Friends Enemies Apples Apples
- 2011 Mr. J. Medeiros Saudade LP
- 2012 Mr. J. Medeiros Pale Blue Dot EP
- 2013 Mr. J. Medeiros The Rockies EP
- 2013 The Procussions The Procussions
- 2014 The Procussions Pro-Exclusive EP
- 2016 Mr. J. Medeiros Milk and Eggs
- 2017 AllttA The Upper Hand
- 2017 AllttA Facing Giants
- 2018 thebandknives KNIVES
- 2018 The Cutlery The Cutlery
- 2019 thebandknives 11110
- 2020 thebandknives "Flagpole + Leviathan" Maxi-Single
- 2020 Mr. J. Medeiros x Møme No Singles EP
- 2020 The Cutlery "I'm An A.." Single
- 2020 AllttA "Ampersand" Single
- 2021 Mr. J. Medeiros x nl:Pomrad "Dena" Single
- 2021 Mr. J. Medeiros x 20syl "Sing That Oh!" Vinyl Exclusive
- 2023 Mr. J. Medeiros x DJ Prizewell "Portagee" Single
- 2023 Mais Oui Ego Go Pop
- 2023 AllttA "Savages" Single
- 2023 AllttA Curio Part I & II

== Featuring ==
=== The Procussions ===
- 2004 The Sound Providers "5 Minutes"
- 2004 DJ Tonk, "Innerspace"
- 2005 Illmind and Symbolyc One (S1) "High Powered"
- 2005 Ohmega Watts, "That Sound"
- 2005 One Block Radius, "Loud and Clear"
- 2005 DJ Tonk, "All Night"
- 2005 Headnodic, "The Drive"
- 2005 Hocus Pocus (group), "Hip Hop?"
- 2007 Hocus Pocus (group), "Vocab"
- 2007 Shin-Ski, "It's All Real"
- 2008 Dajla and Benji, "The Meaning of Life"
- 2008 Praxiz, "Ser Uno Mismo"
- 2008 Green Jade, "Diversity (Come With Us)"
- 2015 fr:Hippocampe Fou, "Dream"
- 2015 ja:Yoshi Blessed, "Hybrid Story"
- 2016 fr:Smokey Joe and the Kid, "Temptation"
- 2021 Jazz Spastiks, "Party People"

=== Mr. J. Medeiros ===
- 1997 Leer43 (?)
- 1998 Blow Up the Spot compilation, "Equipped"
- 2004 Othello (as producer), "Peace", "Conquered"
- 2004 Sharlock Poems (as producer), "Rock On", "Release", "Dead Beat Dad", "The Movement", "Sing", "Four", "Open Book", "Focus", "Shine"
- 2004 Deux Process (as producer), "Cover to Cover"
- 2005 Pigeon John (as producer), "Sleeping Giants" feat. The Grouch & Eligh, "Draw Me Closer"
- 2006 Hocus Pocus (group), "You"
- 2006 Presto, "Right Here" feat. Kim Hill
- 2007 Othello (as producer), "Shallow"
- 2007 Sharlock Poems (as producer), "Heart Art"
- 2008 Braille (musician), "Calculated Risk" feat. Manchild (rapper)
- 2009 Soulution, "Shine Through" feat. Bahamadia
- 2009 Andy Caldwell, "Fear My Pride" feat. Gina Rene, "Gotta Move" feat. Gina Rene (songwriter)
- 2009 Reverse, "Suicidal Eschatology"
- 2009 ja:Yoshi Blessed, "Daddy"
- 2009 ja:Yoshi Blessed (as producer), "Everybody Free"
- 2010 fr:Beat Torrent, "Target Market Remix"
- 2011 The Bodega Brovas, "Keep The Vibe"
- 2011 Hocus Pocus (group), "Signes des Temps"
- 2012 RationaL, "Dream On"
- 2012 Rel McCoy, "Valley"
- 2012 Hidetake Takayama, "Wind Shield"
- 2012 Robert de Boron, "Billy the Kid"
- 2013 Terrain, "Mind-Full"
- 2013 Ghost x Rocdwell, "Stand by My Side"
- 2013 Grace and Peace Records, "Spar"
- 2014 Alice Amelia, "11:11"
- 2014 Von Poe VII, "Paid Dues"
- 2014 Beleaf, "Depressed"
- 2014 Ledeunff, "Steam" (songwriter)
- 2015 fr:Pumpkin & Vin'S da Cuero, "Bye Bye Madeleine"
- 2016 RationaL, "Hell or High Water"
- 2016 pl:Pawbeats Orchestra, "Sign"
- 2017 Ghostnaut, "Rain Drops"
- 2017 Møme, "Let's Go"
- 2017 Sound The What, "High Note"
- 2017 Imperial & K.I.N.E.T.I.K., "One Life"
- 2017 Sapient, "State of the Union"
- 2017 Yusuke Hirado Prospect, "Soap Opera"
- 2018 Cleambeatz, "Out Your Mind"
- 2018 Ghostnaut, "Once Again", "Must Be Love"
- 2018 Todiefor, "Forever Young"
- 2018 Anser, "Fearless"
- 2018 fr:La Fine Équipe (groupe de musique), "What Eva"
- 2019 Deluxe (musical group), "F__k Life"
- 2019 fr:Thylacine (musicien), "4500m"
- 2019 Caravan Palace, "Plume", "Waterguns", and "Leena" (contributing songwriter)
- 2019 Dead Hippies, "Resister"
- 2019 FORM, "F__ks On Zero"
- 2019 Miscellaneous & RVDS, "Darwinism"
- 2019 Parrad, "Flag Pole"
- 2020 Palastic, "Picx"
- 2020 ELEVNS, "Get Back"
- 2020 20syl, "Ampersand"
- 2020 JVNO, "Bring Me Back To Life"
- 2020 Ghostnaut, "Anchors" feat. Raw Collective & Blazino
- 2020 Thaïs Lona, "Till I Know" (contributing songwriter)
- 2020 Slim & the Beast, "Pasadena" (Aedan Remix)
- 2021 Pampa Folks, "Felt Like" (contributing songwriter)
- 2021 Syra, "Sandman" (contributing songwriter)
- 2021 Rob Giano, "Conquer the World" prod. by Symbolyc One
- 2021 Ledeunff, "Sun & Shade" for PARAGES x P[ART]AGES (songwriter)
- 2022 Alligatorz, "Bang Bang" & "Bubbly"
- 2022 The Stoops, "On My Mind"
- 2023 Coeur Nwar & Miscellaneous feat. 20syl, "Bump This"
- 2024 Klem H, "Le Noir"
- 2024 Thaïs Lona, "Dreams" (contributing songwriter)
- 2024 Fiasco, "FIASCO BANGER – Générique Fin"
- 2024 fr:Pendant ce temps sur Terre, "Independent" w/ Just Killed A Man
- 2024 de:Magalí Datzira, "La salut i la bellesa"
- 2024 Grand Turn, "Burning The Sky" feat. Éric Serra
- 2024 JVNO, "I Can't Stay The Night", "Fitness Girl", "Keep Me Up", and "Feel The Rise"
- 2024 Tony Paeleman, "Octopus"
- 2025 Miscellaneous & Degiheugi, "Paris Is Burning"
