= Place 54 =

Studio album by Hocus Pocus
- Released: 2007
- Genre: Rap
- Length: 64:08
- Label: Motown France
- Producer: 20Syl

Hocus Pocus chronology
73 Touches (2005)	Place 54 (2007)	16 Pièces (2010)

Professional ratings
Review scores
Source	Rating
Allmusic	link

Place 54 (pronunciation: PLAHS cen-KAHNT KAHTR as it is a French-language title) is the third studio album by Nantes-based rap group Hocus Pocus, released in 2007. The album title refers to a seat in a passenger train car.

Some of the tracks feature other artists such as Malik Mezzadri ("Quitte á t'aimer"), Omar ("Smile"), Fred Wesley and Stro the 89th Key ("Recyclé"), T-Love & The Procussions ("Vocab!"), Dalja and C2C ("Move On"), Elodie Rama and Tribeqa ("Touriste"), and Taïriq Keda, who produced "Je la Soul". The track "Quitte á t'aimer" is a re-recording of a song from Cesária Évora, a Cape Verdean artist, from her 1995 album Cesária.

Translations of song titles include "Quitte á t'aimer" (At the risk of loving you), "Recyclé" (recycled), "Tournée" (tour), "Touriste" (tourist), "Histoire d'une VHS" (story of a VHS tape), and "Voyage immobile" (unmoving trip).

== Track listing ==
No.	Title	Length
1.	"Place 54"
2.	"Quitte à t’aimer" (feat. Malik Mezzadri)
3.	"Smile" (feat. Omar)
4.	"Recyclé" (feat. Fred Wesley & Stro the 89th Key)
5.	"Normal"
6.	"Vocab! (prelude)"
7.	"Vocab!" (T-Love & The Procussions)
8.	"Mr. Tout Le Monde"
9.	"Tournée"
10.	"Move On" (feat. Dajla & C2C)
11.	"Touriste" (feat. Elodis Rama & Tribeqa)
12.	"Je la Soul" (feat. Taïriq Keda)
13.	"Histoire d'une VHS"
14.	"Voyage immobile"
15.	"Smile (acoustic)" (feat. Omar)

== Accolades ==
The album was nominated under the category Best Urban Music Album at the 2008 Victoires de la Musique.
