= Friends Enemies Apples Apples =

Studio album by Mr. J. Medeiros
- Released: Sept 20, 2009
- Genre: Underground hip hop
- Label: DeMedeiros
- Producer: Stro Elliot

Mr. J. Medeiros chronology
The Art of Broken Glass EP (2009)	Friends Enemies Apples Apples (2009)	Saudade LP (2011)

Professional ratings
Review scores
Source	Rating
URB.com	4/5 stars
Okayplayer.com	4/5 stars
Potholesinmyblog.com	4.5/5 stars

Of gods and girls is the solo album by rapper producer Mr. J. Medeiros. It was released in 2007.

== Track listing ==
1. "Children" (featuring Tara Ellis)
2. "Last Stars"
3. "My Own"
4. "Target Market"
5. "Holding On" (featuring Tara Ellis)
6. "K38"
7. "Apples Apples"
8. "W.A.N.T.S." (featuring Tara Ellis)
9. "Smile"
10. "Left Me" (featuring Tara Ellis)
11. "Brutus"
12. "The Balance" (featuring Tara Ellis)
