= RationaL =

Canadian rapper

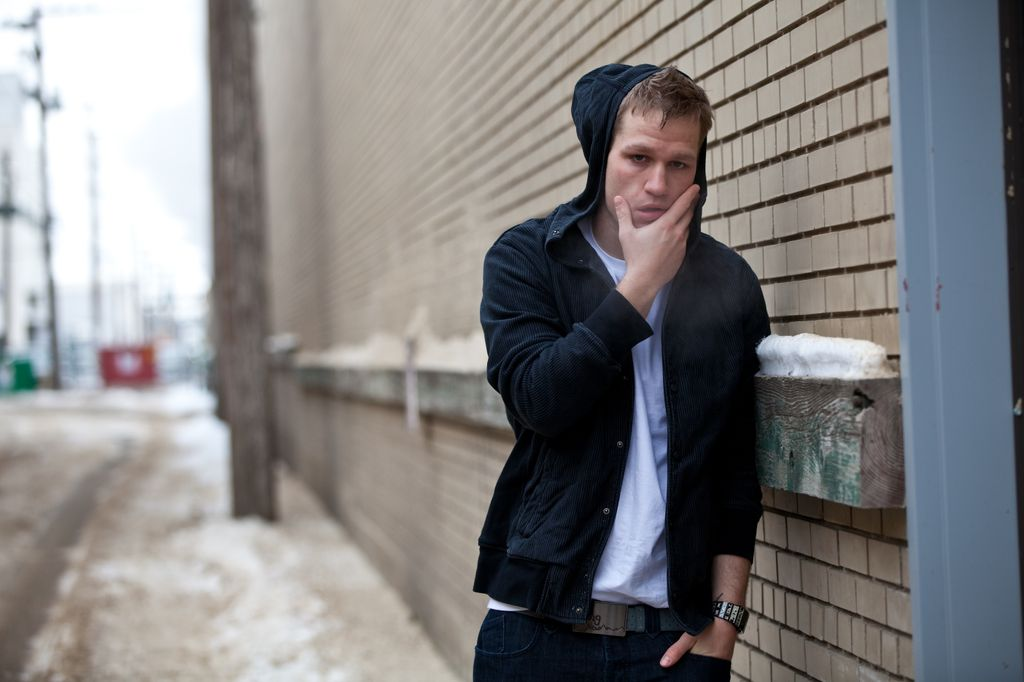

Background information
- Also known as: RationaL
- Born: Matthew Cameron Brotzel
- Origin: Saskatoon, Saskatchewan
- Genre: Canadian hip-hop
- Occupations: Rapper; songwriter
- Instrument: Vocals
- Years active: 2005-present
- Label: Ear RationaL Music
- Website: www.spreadtherash.com

Matthew Cameron Brotzel, better known as RationaL, is a Canadian rapper from Saskatoon, Saskatchewan. On March 30, 2010, RationaL released his debut single "Cocaine Cowboy" off of his upcoming debut album, The BirthWrite LP. The song garnered a 2010 Sphere of Hip-Hop award for "Song of the Year", co-winning the honor alongside 2011 Juno Award winner and fellow Canadian rapper Shad ("Rose Garden"). On July 17, 2012, he released The BirthWrite LP under his own independent imprint, Ear RationaL Music. The album featured guest appearances from Quannum Projects recording artist Pigeon John, former Rawkus Records artist and member of The Procussions, Mr. J. Medeiros, Relic, Theory Hazit and Ohmega Watts.

In the fall of 2007, RationaL began the writing and recording process for his debut album, The BirthWrite LP. The album charted as high as #2 on the !earshot hip-hop charts. Although The BirthWrite LP is officially considered RationaL's debut album, there was a free promotional album released on July 20, 2010 entitled Hard Labor: The BirthWrite Prequel that circulated locally and was made available online. The BirthWrite LP is most notable for the award-winning lead single "Cocaine Cowboy".

== 2013–present ==
On July 23, 2013, RationaL reached an exclusive agreement with the Toronto Blue Jays and Major League Baseball to release his new single, "A Swing and a Belt", dedicated to the late Hall of Fame voice of the Blue Jays, Tom Cheek. Cheek called a Major League record 4,306 consecutive games for 28 straight seasons on the Toronto Blue Jays Radio Network from April 7, 1977, to June 2, 2004. Produced by Imperial, "A Swing and a Belt" received high-praise from former World Series hero Joe Carter. Former Jays manager and current Sportsnet play-by-play man Buck Martinez also raved about the song. Martinez stated, "RationaL has captured everything that Tom Cheek was in regards to baseball. He had his passion, he understood his love of the game, he understood all the great moments in Tom Cheek's broadcasting career. He weaves them into "A Swing and a Belt" in such a way that it brings back so many memories for fans, baseball people and media people that really captures the essence of Tom Cheek's career with the Blue Jays. I don't think it could have been done any better." In addition, Sportsnet aired a clip of the song during the Blue Jays game versus the Houston Astros on July 27, 2013. "A Swing and a Belt" is also the lead single from RationaL's upcoming album entitled Hell or High Water, scheduled for release soon on Ear RationaL Music. Confirmed collaborators for the record thus far include Mr. J. Medeiros, Factor Chandelier, Imperial, Josh Palmer and Juno Award-winning producer and emcee, Relic.

=== Guest appearances ===
Artist	Title	Album	Year
The Battery (Jurny Big & Peace 586)	"Cuddit" (feat. Sev Statik, RationaL & DJ Kair One)	Two EP	2013
Cas Metah	"Truly Cinematic" (feat. MotionPlus, Lyriz, Mouf Warren, RationaL, WonderBrown & Re:Flex the Architect)	Old Fashioned	2015
Fab da Eclectic	"3000 Miles to Graceland" (feat. RationaL & Shortop)	Last Call	2008
Fresh I.E.	"Live On" (feat. RationaL)	The Warren Project	2007
Kaboose	"Can't Call It" (Remix) (feat. RationaL & The Gaff)	Bits & Pieces	2009
Kwest	"El Dorado" (feat. RationaL)	Metropolitan Monastery	2010
Mr. J. Medeiros	"Tri Cycle" (feat. Relic & RationaL)	Digital Single	2013
Parab & Hesam-I-Am	"Meant to Fly" (feat. RationaL)	Digital Single	2013
Relic aka Rel McCoy	"Family Man" (feat. RationaL, Fresco P, Sean Prominent & New Breed MC)	Miles to Go	2012
Relic aka Rel McCoy	"Part of the Plan" (feat. RationaL)	A Different Crown	2019
Skizza	"Stage Lights" (feat. RationaL)	Clark Kent Glasses	2013
Skizza	"Lord Mercy" (feat. RationaL)	Championship Season 2	2023
Skizza	"Geometry" (feat. RationaL)	Winter Classic	2025
Terrain	"Cliché" (feat. RationaL & Relic)	Connected	2013
Terrain	"Ascension" (feat. RationaL)	Ignition	2014

== Discography ==
"Cocaine Cowboy" - Single (2010)

The BirthWrite LP (2012)

"A Swing and a Belt" - Single (2013)

Hell or High Water (2017)
