= An Evening with the Sound Providers =

Studio album by The Sound Providers
- Released: February 24, 2004
- Recorded: 1998–2004
- Genres: Hip-hop• instrumental hip-hop
- Length: 59:30
- Labels: Quarternote• ABB Records
- Producer: The Sound Providers

The Sound Providers chronology
An Evening with the Sound Providers (2004)	Looking Backwards: 2001-1998 (2005)

Singles from An Evening with the Sound Providers
- 1. "The Throwback / Braggin' & Boasting" Released: 2004; 2. "For Old Time's Sake / The Throwback (Remix)" Released: 2004

An Evening with the Sound Providers is the debut studio album by American production duo The Sound Providers (Jason Skills and Soulo). It was released by Quarternote and ABB Records on February 24, 2004. The album features guest appearances from Asheru, Procussions, Wee Bee Foolish, Maspyke and Little Brother.

== Critical reception ==
Professional ratings
Review scores
Source	Rating
AllHipHop	4/5
Pitchfork	7/10
RapReviews	7/10

Noel Dix of Exclaim! said "An Evening is a smooth blend of instrumentals and interludes, but it's the full-on lyrical excursions that make you take notice and give more life to the Sound Providers craftsmanship."

James Durig of IGN claimed "there is not a sub-par guest performance in the bunch, and each adds an extra something to the show. The instrumentals are all unique, although some get repetitive."

Mosi Reeves of Miami New Times noted that "looping lies at the heart of the album", and said "their beats blissfully distend the same loops over several minutes, adding breakdowns and miscellaneous effects, until they swell with reverberating bass lines and sharp drum patterns."

== Track listing ==
All tracks produced by Jason Skills and Soulo

No.	Title	Length
1.	"Intro"	0:55
2.	"Live at the Spot 1"	0:47
3.	"For Old Time's Sake" (vocals by Asheru)	4:15
4.	"Night Steps"	4:54
5.	"5 Minutes" (vocals by Procussions)	3:20
6.	"Only Moments Ago"	2:58
7.	"Autumns Evening Spring"	3:57
8.	"Live at the Spot 2"	0:24
9.	"It's Gonna Bee (Alright)" (vocals by Wee Bee Foolish)	4:18
10.	"Jazz at the Cove"	5:28
11.	"The Throwback" (vocals by Maspyke)	3:53
12.	"Live at the Spot 3"	0:37
13.	"The Prodigal Return"	4:11
14.	"Live at the Spot 4"	0:29
15.	"Pacific Vibrations"	4:00
16.	"Live at the Spot 5"	0:43
17.	"Braggin' & Boasting" (vocals by Little Brother)	4:38
18.	"Never Judge" (vocals by Soulo)	3:59
19.	"Live at the Spot 6"	0:50
20.	"Outro"	1:24
21.	"The Throwback (Remix)" (vocals by Maspyke)	3:30
Total length:		59:30
