= 20syl =

French rapper, record producer, and disc jockey

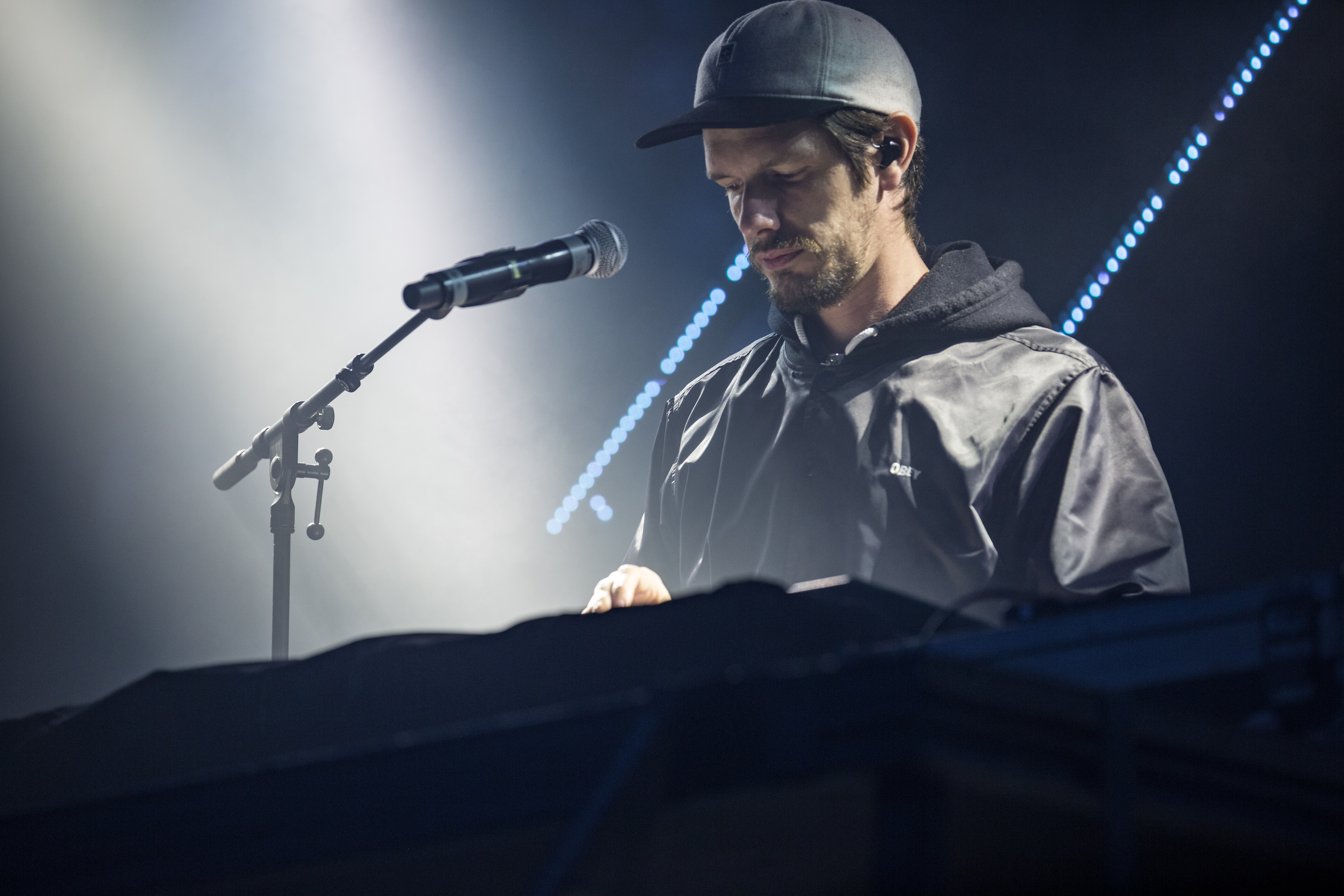
- 20syl performing for AllttA during the 2017 Natural Games in Millau, France.

Background information
- Born: Sylvain Richard; 17 February 1979 (age 47); Nantes, France
- Genres: Hip hop, French rap, jazz rap, turntablism, electronic music
- Occupations: Rapper, disc jockey, composer, beatmaker, producer, graphic designer
- Years active: 1995–present
- Member of: Hocus Pocus, C2C, AllttA

Sylvain Richard (born February 17, 1979), better known by his stage name 20syl (pronounced "vain-seel", French: [vɛ̃sil]), is a French rapper, disc jockey, and producer. He is a composer and MC in the group Hocus Pocus, a member of the beatmaker collective of DJs C2C, one half of the Hip-Hop/electronic duo AllttA, and the quadruple world champion DMC Team. He published his first EP, Motifs, in 2014, followed by Motifs II in 2015.

During his career, he also produced for artists and groups such as Diam's, Disiz, Kohndo, Slum Village, Fabe, Scred Connexion, Nakk, and Sully Sefil and was involved in projects such as Just Us vol.1 or Original Bombattak.

== Biography ==
Richard, originally a graphic designer, graduated from the Graduate School of Fine Arts in Nantes Métropole. He began his musical career in his bedroom at his parents' house in Rezé.

In 1995, Richard and Cambia released their first mixtape, Première Formule. Recorded in a makeshift studio, the first self-produced cassette was sold in the courtyard of their school. In 1997, they team up with DJ Greem, a high school friend of Richard's, to form the group Hocus Pocus, and released their first album as a trio, Seconde Formule, in 1998. Hocus Pocus mixes elements specific to hip-hop (scratches, samples, and rap) with an instrumental sound influenced by jazz, soul, and funk. Alongside Hocus Pocus, they created, in collaboration with DJ Atom and DJ Pfel, a group called C2C (also known as "Coups2Cross"). C2C was the world champion DMC team four years in a row, from 2003 to 2006. They found the collaboration of two MCs and a DJ did not work on stage and went their separate ways; Richard continued his production as 20syl, and DJ Greem invested specifically in C2C.

In 2001, Richard worked again with DJ Greem and Cambia on stage as Hocus Pocus. The same year, they created the label On & On and released the maxi Sick, which sold around 4000 copies. Three years later, they released the album 73 Touches (in reference to the number of piano keys). Largely influenced by jazz, they refer to Miles Davis and Billie Holiday. Mathieu Lelièvre on keyboard, Hervé Godard on bass, and David Le Deunff on guitar complement the trio. The same album was reissued in 2006 with a new version of Sick and six new titles.

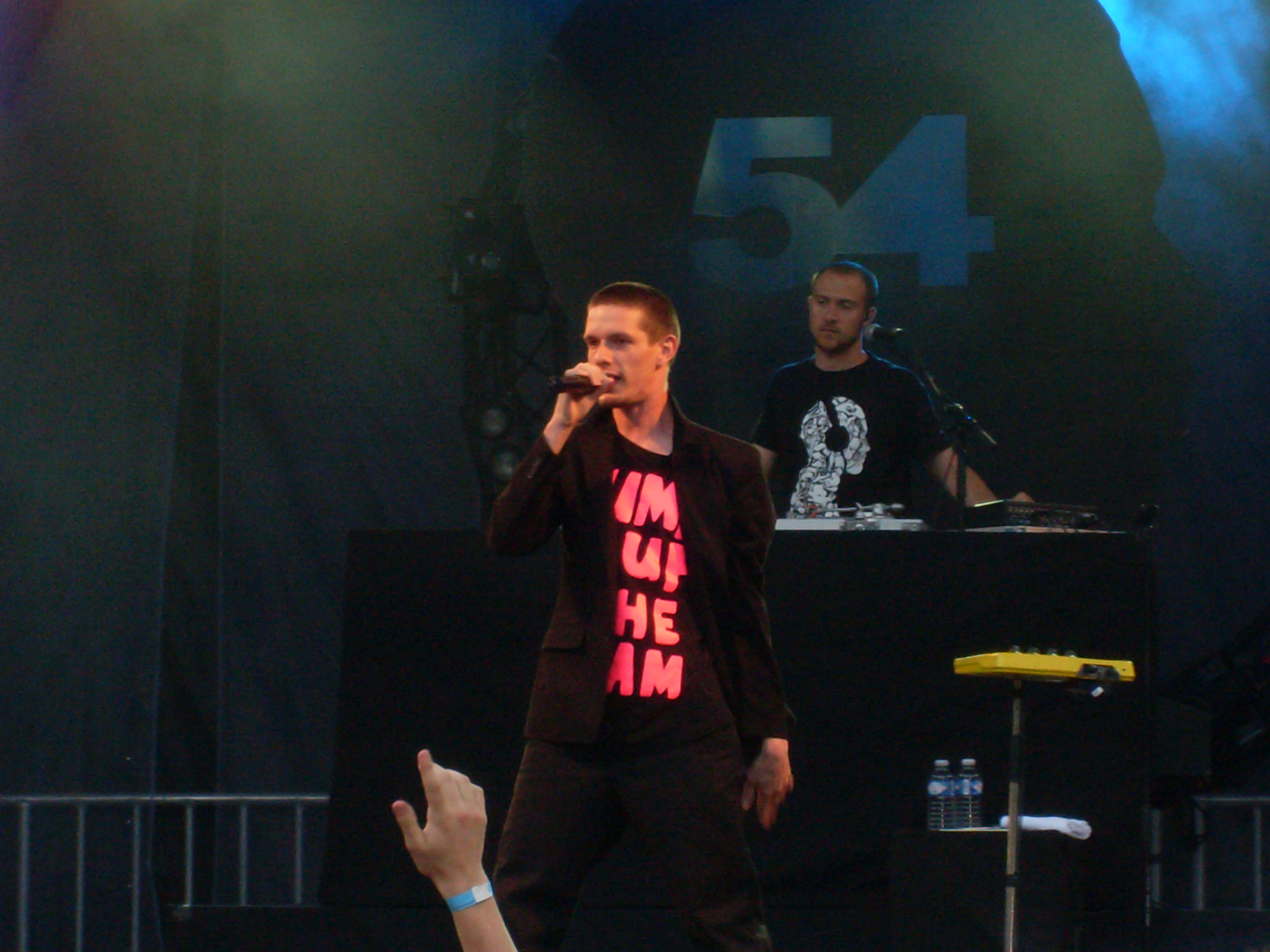
20syl performing with DJ Greem in 2008

The album Place 54, released in October 2007, increased their willingness to create acoustic hip-hop. For this album, they signed with the label Motown France to promote and distribute it. The album was well received and attracted interest from mainstream TV and radio. In 2008, Hocus Pocus was nominated for a Victoires de la Musique award in the category "Urban Music Album of the Year".

Richard published his first solo EP, Motifs, on June 9, 2014; the site sourdoreille.net considers this EP "a real gem", while wordplaymagazine.com praises Richard's style as "frankly remarkable". His second EP, Motifs II, was published on May 11, 2015. Regarding the cover of Motifs II, Richard explains: "For the first volume, I played on the contrast between the zebra and the checkerboard. For this one, I wanted another animal. I like animals with a solemn air, which release an aesthetic force. When I came across this owl, I found him mysterious and chic. I also chose the motif of the opposition in the checkered plumage. It is a way to symbolize the two aspects of my music: electronic and organic. This refined and enigmatic image raises questions."

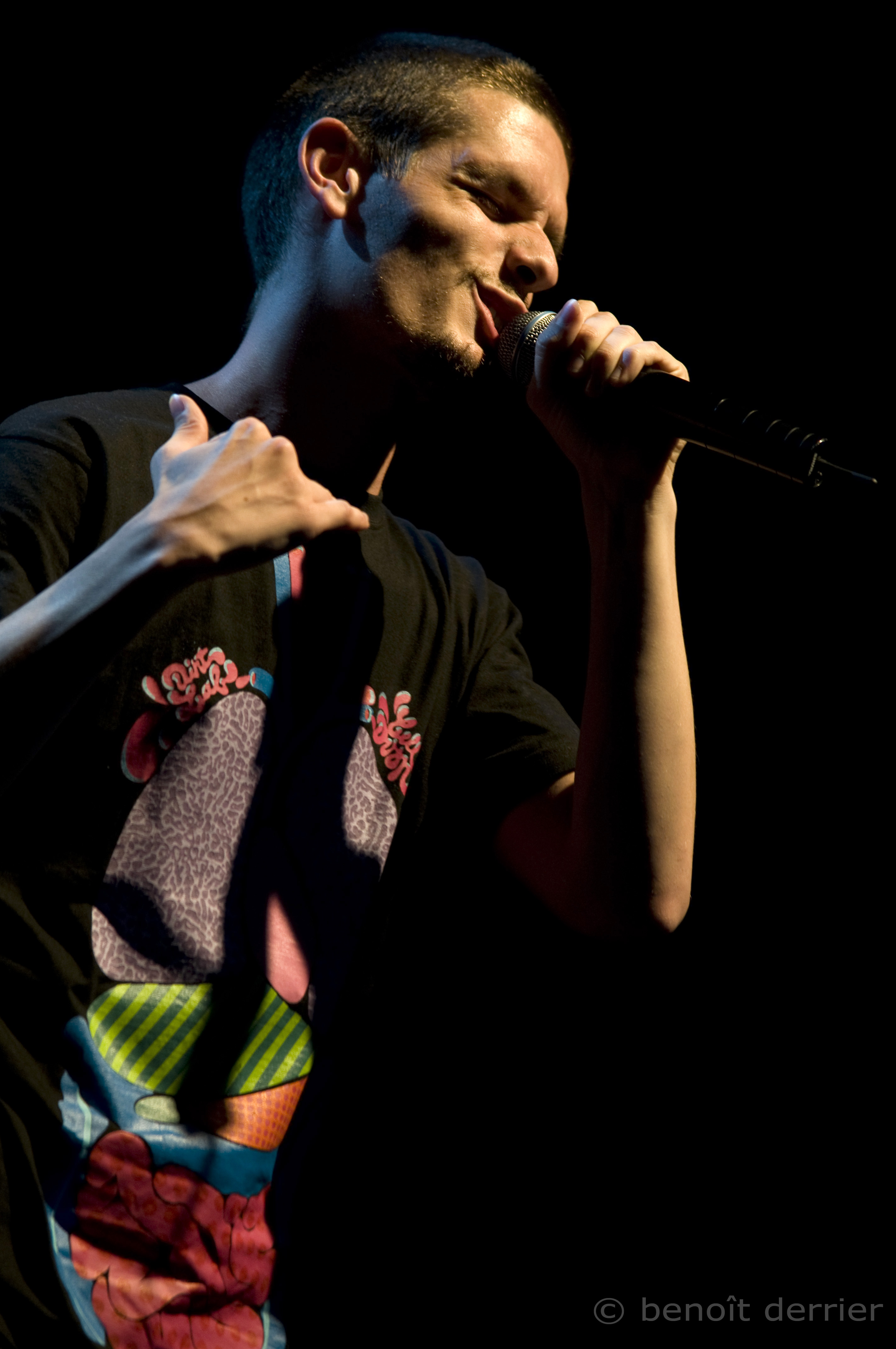
20syl live at Aux Zarbs festival 2008

In July 2015 in Nantes, Richard presented the U, an interactive musical skateboard ramp (in collaboration with the collective Herrmutt Lobby). herrmuttlobby.com says regarding U "The skater is the musician and the ramp is the instrument. He composes and decomposes the rhythm, he breaks down initial binary arrangements, making the digital human again for a moment." In September 2015, The Apple Keynote used a piece of Richard's music to promote the functionality of Siri on the Apple Watch in their "Choose Colorfully" advertisement. In late 2015, Richard published a remix of the PLPS song How I Feel. In January 2016, he published his first-year production entitled Inertia. Also in January 2016, he published a remix of the song Walk Walk by Yael Naim.

In 2015, he formed the group AllttA (A Little Lower Than The Angels) with the Californian rapper Mr. J. Medeiros. Their debut album, titled The Upper Hand, was released on February 17, 2017. Their sophomore album, titled Facing Giants, was released on December 1, 2017. The first part of their third album, Curio, was released on May 12, 2023, with the second coming on September 29, 2023.

== Discography ==
=== Singles ===
- 2016 : "Inertia (for the charity compilation AMAL)"
- 2021 : "Bagarre"

=== EPs ===
- 2014 : Motifs
- 2015 : Motifs II

=== Albums ===
- 2020 : 36 (Beats & Types)
- 2024 : Sula Bassana (with Christophe Panzani)

=== Remix albums ===
- 1999 : 20syl's Remix Tape

=== Collaborations and remixes ===
- 2002 : 20syl – "On and On" (from the mixtape 1son2rue by Cut Killer)
- 2006 : Sixième Sens feat. 20syl, Prince d'arabee, Orelsan, Gringe – "Herbes de Provinces"
- 2007 : Mr. J. Medeiros feat. 20syl – "Amelie" (from the album Of Gods and Girls by Mr. J. Medeiros)
- 2012 : Mr. J. Medeiros feat. Shad – "Pale Blue Dot" (20syl Remix)
- 2012 : Oxmo Puccino feat. Orelsan, Greg Frite, Busta Flex, Grodash, Youssoupha, Dabaaz, 3010 & 20syl – "Le sucre pimenté" (Remix)
- 2013 : Kraked Unit – "Chinese Puzzle" (20syl Remix)
- 2013 : Rihanna – "Stay" (20syl You Can't Be Serious Remix)
- 2013 : Gush – "Sieblings" (20syl Remix)
- 2013 : Moongaï – "Cosmofamille" (20syl Remix)
- 2013 : "Game, Set & Match"
- 2013 : Electro Deluxe – "Devil" (20syl Remix)
- 2013 : "Blitz the Ambassador" feat. 20syl, Emicida & Y'akoto – Respect Mine
- 2013 : Elodie Rama – "City of Hope" (20syl Version)
- 2013 : Dtwice – "Devil's Tune" (20syl Remix)
- 2013 : "Misteur Valaire" – Don't Get Là (20syl Remix)
- 2013 : "Room Bang" (Grems feat. 20syl)
- 2013 : "My Heart"(Letters to the Sun feat. 20syl)
- 2014 : Gregory Porter – "Liquid Spirit" (20syl Remix)
- 2014 : 20syl & Kafutchino – "Kouign Amann" (from the album La Boulangerie, Vol. 3 – La Fine Equipe & Friends by La Fine Equipe)
- 2014 : Ed Sheeran – "Thinking Out Loud" (20syl Remix)
- 2014 : Shuko feat. CL Smooth & 20syl – "The Same"
- 2014 : "Yelle" – Complètement fou (20syl Remix)
- 2014 : Game Set & Match II (created for the 2014 BNP Paribas Masters international tennis tournament)
- 2014 : V052 V1M (Jakarta Records album Summer In Jakarta)
- 2014 : Coin Banks feat. 20syl, Tab-One, Anders & The Ruby Horns – "Thomas Lawrence" (from the EP Heads by Coin Banks)
- 2014 : Pigeon John – "Boomerang" (feat. 20syl)
- 2014 : "Bet Dap Goom Bown" (BoomBap Festival Beat)
- 2014 : "The Drops" – Atalante (20syl Remix)
- 2014 : "Obsession" (Fixpen Sill & 20syl)
- 2014 : Schoolboy Q – "The Purge / Rapfix Cypher" (20syl Remix)
- 2014 : Kyla La Grange – "Cut Your Teeth" (20syl Remix)
- 2014 : "10YRS" (Hip OPsession 10th Anniversary Track)
- 2014 : Seinabo Sey – "Younger" (20syl Remix)
- 2014 : King Krule – "Easy Easy" (20syl Remix)
- 2014 : Kendrick Lamar – "Sing that Shit" (20syl Juicy Remix)
- 2015 : "Yellow" (from the soundtrack to the film Yellowbird)
- 2015 : Moar & Sarsha Simone – "Gonna Do Me" (20syl Remix)
- 2015 : Ibrahim Maalouf – "Red and Black Light" (20syl Remix)
- 2015 : PLPS – "How I Feel" (20syl Remix)
- 2016 : Yaël Naim – "Walk Walk" (20syl Remix)
- 2016 : ODESZA – "It's Only" (feat. Zyra) (20syl Remix)
- 2016 : The Geek x Vrv feat. Mirror Signal – "I Don't Wanna Know" (20syl Remix)
- 2016 : Everydayz, Phazz – "Almeria" (20syl Remix)
- 2018 : AllttA – "Bucket" (20syl Remix)
- 2018 : thebandknives & AllttA – "thebandknives x AllttA"
- 2018 : Electro Deluxe – "Keep my Baby Dancing" (20syl Remix)
- 2018 : Inüit – "Tomboy" (20syl Remix)
- 2019 : La Fine Équipe, Grems & 20syl – "Nobu" (from the album 5Th Season by La Fine Equipe)
- 2019 : Electric guest – "Dollar" (20syl Remix)
- 2019 : Parrad feat. AllttA – "Flag Pole"
- 2020 : AllttA – "Ampersand"
- 2020 : Thaïs Lona – Best Part (Daniel Cesar cover) (20syl Remix)
- 2021 : Brent Faiyaz – "Circles" (20syl Remix)
- 2021 : AvA – "Regarde Moi" (Prod. 20syl & Grégoire Vaillant)
- 2022 : La Chica – "Agua" (20syl Remix)
- 2022 : Too Many T's & 20syl – "Roots"
- 2022 : Beyoncé – "Break My Soul" (20syl Remix)
- 2022 : Thaïs Lona – "B.N.D" (20syl Remix)
- 2023 : Miscellaneous & Coeur Nwar feat. 20syl & Mr. J. Medeiros – "Bump This" (from the album Chiaroscuro by Miscellaneous & Coeur Nwar)
- 2023 : Alligatorz – "Pra Ver Você Sambar" (20syl Remix)
- 2023 : AllttA – "Savages" (contains AI-generated feature by Jay-Z)

=== Collaborative albums ===
- 1996 : Première Formule (mixtape, with Hocus Pocus)
- 1998 : Seconde Formule (self-produced album, with Hocus Pocus)
- 2001 : Flyin' Saucer (with C2C)
- 2002 : Flyin' Saucer II (with C2C)
- 2002 : Acoustic HipHop Quintet (maxi, with Hocus Pocus)
- 2002 : Conscient (maxi, with Hocus Pocus)
- 2002 : On and On Part II (maxi, with Hocus Pocus)
- 2003 : Flyin' Saucer III (with C2C)
- 2005 : 73 Touches (with Hocus Pocus)
- 2007 : Place 54 (with Hocus Pocus)
- 2010 : 16 pièces (with Hocus Pocus)
- 2012 : Down the Road (EP, with C2C)
- 2012 : Tetra (LP, with C2C)
- 2016 : Touch Down, Pt. I (EP, with AllttA)
- 2016 : The Woods (EP, with AllttA)
- 2016 : AllttA (EP with AllttA)
- 2017 : The Upper Hand (LP, with AllttA)
- 2017 : Facing Giants (LP, with AllttA)
- 2020 : Ampersand (Single, with AllttA)
- 2023 : Curio Part I (LP, with AllttA)
- 2023 : Curio Part II (LP, with AllttA)
