= AllttA =

Franco-American hip hop group

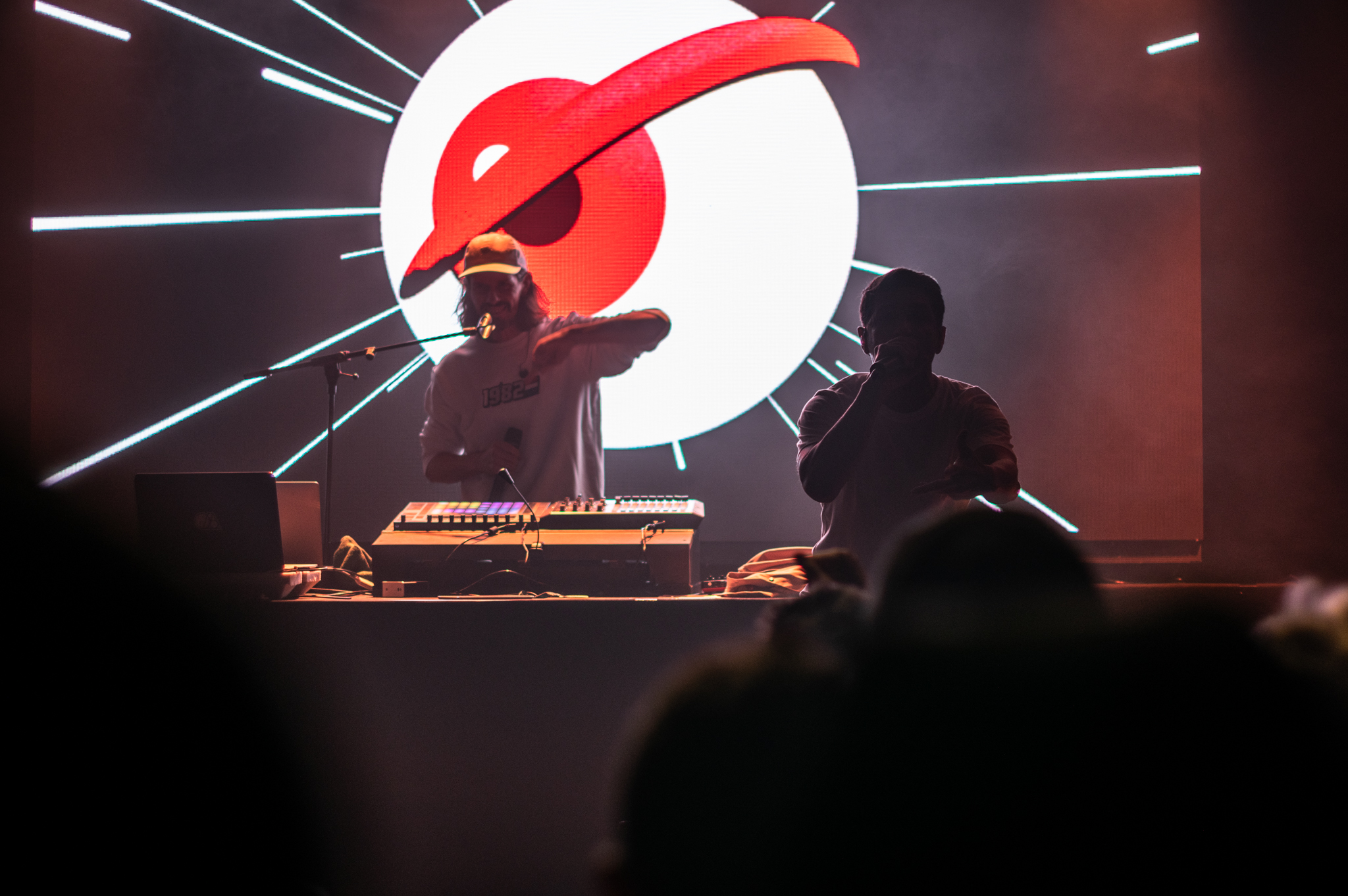

Background information
- Origin: Nantes, France, Los Angeles, U.S.
- Genres: hip hop; electro; alternative hip hop; progressive rap
- Years active: 2015–
- Label: On and On Records
- Members: Mr. J. Medeiros, 20Syl
- Website: alltta.com

AllttA is a French-American electronic hip hop duo formed in 2015, consisting of producer 20syl and American rapper Mr. J. Medeiros. The duo's music blends electronic beats with elements of hip hop, exploring various themes and styles. Short for "A little lower than the Angels" a reference Psalm 8:5

== Career ==
=== The Upper Hand & Facing Giants ===
In 2016, AllttA released their debut album The Upper Hand, which they performed at the Vieilles Charrues and Solidays festivals. The following year, they released the Facing Giants single series, releasing nine tracks, including the standout "Muggsy Bogues".

==== "Muggsy Bogues" video ====
The 2017 music video for "Muggsy Bogues," part of the Facing Giants series, featured a documentary-style approach exploring the experiences of young people with hearing impairments. The technology used in the video allowed viewers to feel vibrations from the music. It received praise for its unique portrayal of the hearing-impaired community.

==== "Savages" single ====
In 2023, AllttA released "Savages," which used artificial intelligence (AI) to recreate the vocal style of rapper Jay-Z. The track raised ethical questions about AI in music.

=== Curio Parts 1 & 2 ===
In 2023, AllttA released Curio Parts 1 & 2, an album series accompanied by a limited edition embossed vinyl. The duo also headlined at Paris's Élysée Montmartre in the same year.

==== Collaborations ====
AllttA frequently collaborates with tech YouTuber Marques Brownlee, whose videos often feature the duo's music.

== Discography ==
- 2016 The Upper Hand
- 2017 Facing Giants
- 2020 "Ampersand" Single
- 2023 "Savages" Single
- 2023 Curio Part l & ll
