= Looking Backwards: 2001-1998 =

Looking Backwards 2001-1998

Compilation album by The Sound Providers
- Released: September 17, 2005
- Recorded: 1998–2001
- Genre: Hip-hop
- Length: 52:41
- Labels: Quarternote• ABB Records
- Producer: The Sound Providers

The Sound Providers chronology
An Evening with the Sound Providers (2004)	Looking Backwards 2001-1998 (2005)	True Indeed (with Surreal) (2006)

Singles from Looking Backwards: 2001-1998
- 1. "Dope Transmission / The Field" Released: 1998; 2. "Get Down / No Time" Released: 1999; 3. "The Difference / Yes Y'all" Released: 2000; 4. "Who Am I" Released: 2001

Looking Backwards 2001-1998 is the second album by American production duo The Sound Providers (Jason Skills and Soulo) and rapper Profile. It was released by Quarnernote and ABB Records on September 17, 2005. The album is a compilation of songs made when Profile was still a member of the group, some of which were released as 12" singles from 1998-2001. The album also includes a number of previously unreleased songs.

== Critical reception ==
Professional ratings
Review scores
Source	Rating
AllMusic	4.5/5 stars
RapReviews	8/10

Noel Dix of Exclaim! said "Looking Backwards is some classic material from a very good West coast crew when they were in their prime."

Max Herman of XLR8R credited Profile as "one of the most distinct voices around" that was "perfectly complimented by Soulo and Jay Skills easygoing jazz-and funk-driven beats", albeit with a "somewhat redundant lyrical approach".

== Track listing ==
All tracks produced by Jason Skills and Soulo

No.	Title	Length
1.	"Intro"	1:30
2.	"Dope Transmission"	4:26
3.	"The Field"	3:41
4.	"J Rocc Radio Promo"	1:37
5.	"Get Down"	4:38
6.	"No Time"	3:15
7.	"Choc Promo"	1:47
8.	"Breath Testing"	2:58
9.	"The Difference"	4:09
10.	"Yes Y'all"	4:32
11.	"That's It"	3:55
12.	"Who Am I"	4:23
13.	"7L Promo"	1:23
14.	"Fresh Rhymes"	4:12
15.	"DL Promo"	1:42
16.	"Who Am I" (remix)	4:33
Total length:		52:41
