= C2C (group) =

French musical group

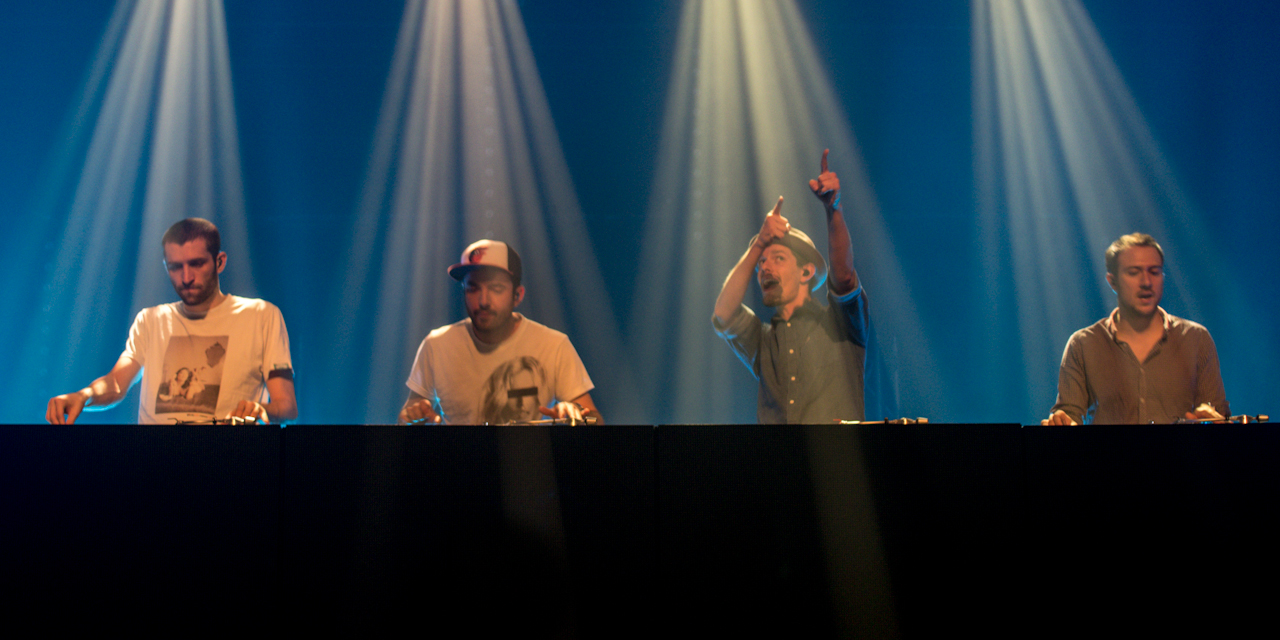
- C2C performing in 2012

Background information
- Also known as: Coups2Cross
- Origin: Nantes, France
- Genres: Electronica; trip hop; electro soul; alternative hip hop
- Years active: 1998–present
- Labels: On and On Records
- Members: 20syl; DJ Greem; DJ Atom; DJ pFeL
- Website: c2cmusic.fr

C2C (also known as Coups2Cross) is a French musical group formed in 1998 in the city of Nantes. The collaboration group consists of four French DJs: Atom and pFeL from Beat Torrent and 20Syl and Greem from Hocus Pocus. Each member of the group uses his turntable as an instrument, recreating in turn drums, bass guitars, scratching a guitar riff, or simulating a brass instrument.

They met during their high school years and as teens they were fascinated by the work of DJ Qbert and DJ Shadow, innovators in the art of turntablism. They set off to make a name for themselves at the turn of the millennium and soon started developing their own unique performing style.

== Musical career ==
In September 2006, C2C won their fourth DMC (Disco Mix Club) team world championship title in a row. With their previous victories in 2003, 2004, and 2005, they achieved a first quadruple. They also won the ITF team championship in 2005 and the Hip Hop World Challenge title. These successes allowed them to perform all around the world with DJ Qbert, A-Trak, DJ Kentaro, Scratch Perverts, and DJ Vadim.

Both 20syl and Greem are founders of Hocus Pocus. One of their albums, released on Motown France, has earned them two nominations at the Victoires de la Musique, France's equivalent of the Grammys. DJ Atom and pFeL, founders of Beat Torrent, have performed almost one thousand concerts and have been featured in each other's album releases.

The group released their first EP "Down the Road" on 23 January 2012, and their first album, "Tetra"(stylized as Tetr4), on 3 September 2012. The cover art of this album was done by design agency LVL Studio, and features a photograph by Wang Chien-Yang. The single "Down the Road" was voted into 88th place in the annual Triple J's Hottest 100 of 2012.

Their album "Tetra" earned them 4 trophies out of 4 nominations during the 2013 edition of Victoires de la Musique, including “Best New Artist”, “Best Music Video”, and “Best Live Show”.

C2C are winners of the 2013 European Border Breakers Awards, which honor the best new music acts in Europe. The award ceremony takes place at the Eurosonic Noorderslag music festival in Groningen, Netherlands.

Their song "Down the Road" was used in the 6th episode of the first season of The 100, as well as in the credits of season 5 episode 2 of Silicon Valley.

Their song “Happy (feat. Derek Martin)” was used in a Macy's TV commercial, "Celebrate," in 2016. The song was used again in a Macy's TV commercial, "Celebrate: Spring," in 2017.

=== Live performance ===
The band uses tailor-made LED-display systems to provide a dynamic visual representation of their performances. During the summer of 2012, the group toured around Europe performing in many sold-out events. In early 2013, they received two European Border Breakers Awards, one as the laureate for France, the other being the Public Choice award.

During their AV tour they included original ideas for enhancing their live performances. “Every time we drop a sound there will be a visual,” says pFeL. “It brings another dimension to the show.”

=== Music videos ===
C2C has released 6 music videos for their tracks featured on "Tetra": “F.U.Y.A.”, released on 7 December 2011, and features C2C in a castle corridor, with numerous duplicates, performing the various beats and sound-effects for the song in the video; “Down the Road”, originally released just as an official song video on YouTube on 22 January 2012, was re-released as a music video on 8 June 2012, featuring pro-skateboarder Richie Jackson interacting with a reality-bending skateboard; “The Beat”, released on 21 June 2012, features rotoscoped images of the C2C members playing the song to a variety of flashing shapes; “Arcades”, released on 8 August 2012, features a woman dancing with some mirrored and multi-patterned images; “Happy (feat. Derek Martin)”, released on 12 December 2012, features a black and white film about a group of men joyously dancing at a roadside tent-church; and “Delta”, released on 25 September 2013, features an animated story of a civilization of blue aliens trying to fight against an inverted pyramid.

All of the videos have received at least a million views on YouTube; as of 5 May 2024, “F.U.Y.A.” has 1.1 million as an official audio and 12.7 million as a music video respectively, “Down the Road” has 34 million as an official audio and 13 million as a music video respectively, “The Beat” has 3.8 million as an official audio and 2.1 million as a music video respectively, “Arcades” has 4 million as an official audio and 3.9 million as a music video respectively, “Happy (feat. Derek Martin)” has 1.6 million as an official audio and 24.9 million as a music video respectively, and “Delta” has 4.4 million as an official audio and 48.5 million as a music video respectively.

== Members ==
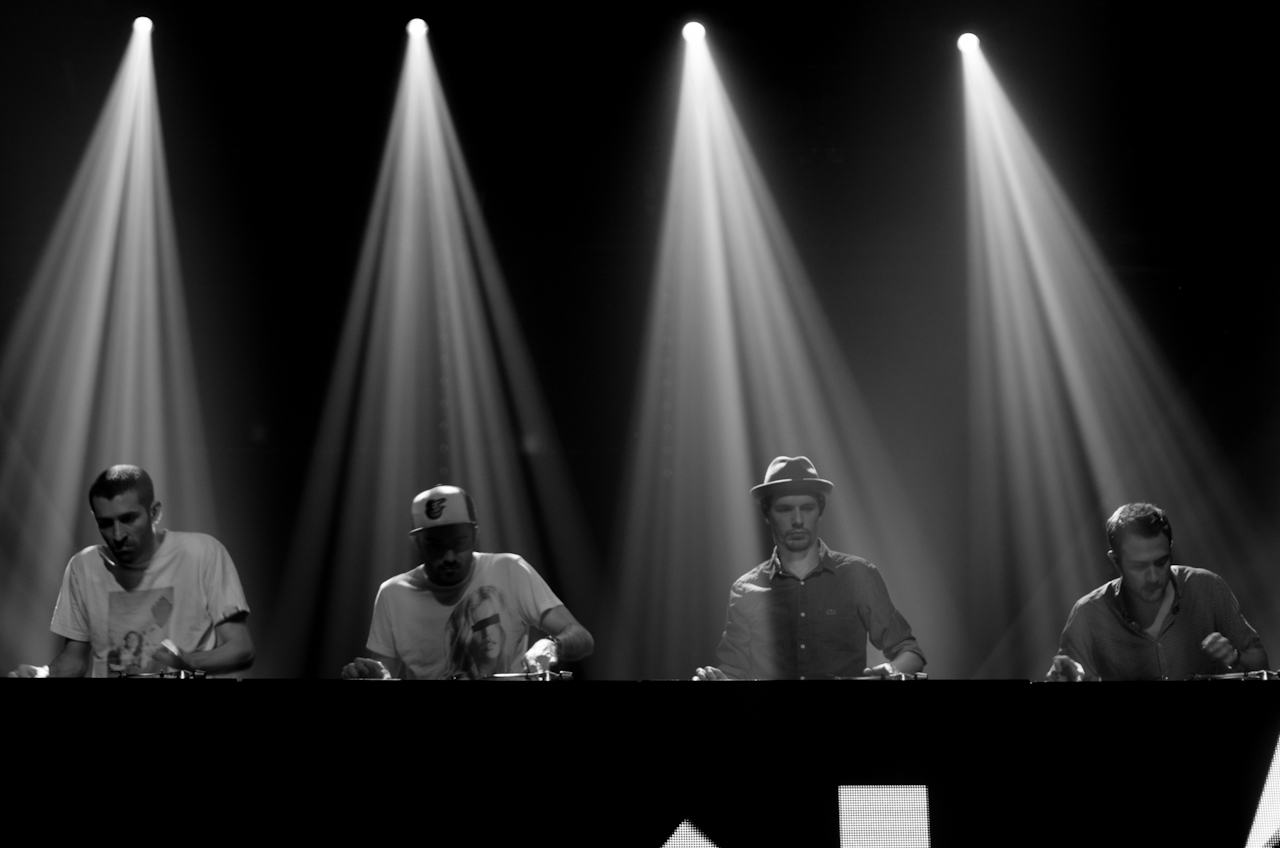
C2C - Le chabada - Sept 2012. From left to right: DJ Atom, DJ pFeL, 20syl, and DJ Greem

Name	Background	Instruments
DJ Greem (Guillaume Jaulen)	Hocus Pocus DJ, Vinyl Addict radio host, Ex Tribeqa DJ	engineering (studio), bass (live)
20syl (Sylvain Richard)	Hocus Pocus MC & founding member, member of AllttA	MC (studio & live), guitar (live)
DJ Atom (Thomas Le Vexier)	Beat Torrent founding member, producer at Soul Square	Turntables, keyboards, programming (studio & live)
DJ pFeL (Pierre Forestier)	Beat Torrent founding member, ex Beat Assailant DJ	Drums (studio & live)

== Discography ==
=== Studio albums ===
Title	Tracks	Album details	Peak chart positions					Certifications
Title	Tracks	Album details	FRA	BEL (Vl)	BEL (Wa)	NL	SWI	Certifications
Tetra	The Cell Down the Road Kings Season (feat. Rita J & Moongaï) Because of You (feat. Pigeon John) Delta Who Are You (feat. Oliver Day Soul) Happy (feat. Derek Martin) Give Up the Ghost (feat. Jay-Jay Johanson) The Beat Genius (feat. Gush) Together (feat. Ledeunff & Blitz The Ambassador) Arcades Le Banquet (feat. Tigerstyle, Netik, Rafik, Vajra & Kentaro) F.U.Y.A.	Released: 3 September 2012; Label: On And On Records; Format: CD, LP, cassette, digital download	1	87	12	74	35	SNEP: 2× Platinum

=== Extended plays ===
Title	Tracks	Album details	Peak chart positions
Title	Tracks	Album details	FRA
Down the Road EP	Down the Road Arcades Someday The Beat F.U.Y.A.	Released: 23 January 2012; Label: On And On Records; Format: CD, digital download	18

=== Singles ===
Title	Year	Peak chart positions						Album
Title	Year	FRA	BEL (Vl)	BEL (Wa)	NL	SWI	CAN	Album
"Down the Road"	2012	1	103	9	97	36	66	Tetra
"Happy" (feat. Derek Martin)	2012	13	73	10	76	60	—	Tetra

=== Other charted songs ===
Title	Year	Peak chart positions		Album
Title	Year	FRA	BEL (Wa)	Album
"Delta"	2012	120	93	Tetra
"The Cell"	2012	128	—	Tetra
"Who Are You" (feat. Olivier Day Soul)	2012	167	—	Tetra
"Because Of You" (feat. Pigeon John)	2012	182	—	Tetra
"Genius" (feat. Gush)	2012	193	—	Tetra
"Arcades"	2012	199	—	Tetra
"F.U.Y.A."	2013	106	—	Tetra
