= Bodega Brovas =

- Origin: Dallas, Texas, U.S.
- Genres: Hip hop,
- Years active: 2007–Present
- Members: Keynote; Travii the 7th Headkrack
- Website: Official Site

Bodega Brovas is a three-member Hip-Hop collective. Members Travii the 7th and Headkrack whom are from Chicago and Bronx, NY, respectively formed the group with Keynote in his hometown of Dallas, Texas.

Getting their start in 2009, The Bodega Brovas began touring in the European countries and in 2012, the group was included in the American Graffiti Tour along with Playdough, Koncept, and Tanya Morgan. By 2013 The Bodega Brovas had made two appearances on AllHipHop's Top 50 Underground lists and made an appearance on Sway In The Morning in 2015. In As part of the line up on "The 'MoDega' Europe 2012 Tour" The Bodega Brovas have performed alongside Tanya Morgan, Souls of Mischief and the Artifacts in countries that include France, Ireland, Germany and the UK.

Collaborations with The Bodega Brovas include Mr. J Medeiros, Jean Grae, Astronautalis, and former Nice & Smooth rapper, MC Greg Nice.

Both Headkrack and Keynote have an extensive history in radio. Keynote being on 97.9FM KBFB and Headkrack appearing on Dish Nation via the Rickey Smiley Morning Show, working with Rickey Smiley.

In 2010, Headkrack appeared as a contestant during Red Bull's and Eminem's collaborative event RedBull EmSee: The Road to 8 Mile National Finals at Detroit's Saint Andrew's Hall.

== Discography ==
- Fancy Anthrax (2011)
- Festivus: A Beginner's Guide To Believing In Bodega (2014)
- Who Run It (2016)
- LGA (Loaded Guns and Alcohol) (2016)
