= The Procussions =

American hip hop group

- Origin: Colorado Springs, Colorado; Los Angeles, California
- Genres: Hip hop
- Years active: 1998–2008, 2012–2014
- Labels: Bassmentalism Records; Rawkus Records
- Members: Mr. J. Medeiros; Stro Elliot
- Past members: Rez; Qq; Vise Versa
- Website: theprocussions.com

The Procussions are an American hip hop group based in Los Angeles, California, consisting of rapper Mr. J. Medeiros and rapper-producer Stro Elliot (Stro the 89th Key) and rapper Resonant. Known for their eclectic production, socially conscious lyricism, and dynamic live show, the group recorded two albums – one with the reborn Rawkus Records – and an EP before disbanding in 2008 to pursue solo efforts. The group reformed in 2012, funding a new recording via Indiegogo. The resulting self-titled album was released on September 24, 2013.

== Career ==
=== 1998–2002 ===
The Procussions were formed in Colorado Springs, Colorado in 1998 when two competing b-boy crews – SOL and TSF – decided to combine forces. The group began with five members: Mr. J. Medeiros, Stro (the 89th Key) Elliot, Rez (originally Resonant), Vise Versa and Qq (pronounced 'Q'). The group became a quartet two years later when Qq stepped down after his collapse on stage at their first Denver show led to a diagnosis of multiple sclerosis. The group continued to perform throughout Colorado, opening for acts such as Run DMC, The Pharcyde, and Common, and released two 12-inch singles,""All That It Takes" and "Leave Her Alone", which gained distribution through ABB Records. "All That It Takes" reached No. 9 on the College Music Journal hip hop charts, and cracked the top 10 and 20 charts with Urban Networks and Insomniac, while "Leave Her Alone" reached No. 4 on the Rap Attack DJ charts.

Based on this momentum, Mr J convinced the group to relocate from Colorado Springs to Los Angeles in an attempt to make their music a full-time career. Shortly after, Vise Versa left The Procussions to form the group Deux Process.

=== 2003–2007 ===
==== As Iron Sharpens Iron ====
Once in Los Angeles, The Procussions independently released their first album, As Iron Sharpens Iron, through Bassmentalism Records on October 28, 2003. The album rose to No. 5 on the CMJ Hip-Hop charts.

==== Up All Night ====
In early 2004, The Procussions entered the studio with producer-engineer Jason Skills of The Sound Providers, recording an 8-hour overnight jam session that featured Stro on drums and Rhodes piano, and spoken word and freestyle rhymes from Rez and Mr J. The session formed the basis of their jazz-flavoured EP, Up All Night, which saw exclusive release in Japan on September 20, 2004.

==== 5 Sparrows For 2 Cents ====
In 2006, the group recorded their second full-length, 5 Sparrows For 2 Cents, featuring production from Stro and art direction by Rez. After discussions with several record labels, they became the first band to sign with the newly resurrected Rawkus Records. 5 Sparrows served as Rawkus' first post-reboot release, hitting stores on May 30, 2006, and reaching No. 8 on the Billboard Heatseekers chart. The release coincided with the launch of their first national, co-headlining tour.

==== Touring ====
As their albums gained attention, The Procussions worked to expand their fan base and reputation with constant touring throughout the US, Canada, Japan, Australia, and Europe. They became known for high-energy shows which incorporated live drums and DJ Vajra on turntables. Over the course of their three releases, they opened for and toured with several high-profile acts including The Roots, Sound Tribe Sector 9, and Talib Kweli. Following the release of 5 Sparrows For Two Cents, The Procussions embarked on The Storm Tour with Aceyalone, Ugly Duckling, ¡Mayday! and Wrekonize, playing 40 cities in six months. They also returned to Europe for a series of festival dates. After one US show, they were approached by Ali Shaheed Muhammad of A Tribe Called Quest, who had been following their career and wanted to have them join Tribe on 2K Sports' 2006 Bounce Tour. The Procussions were subsequently added to the bill, playing 15 cities with Tribe & Rhymefest.

While touring France in 2004, The Procussions connected with French hip hop group Hocus Pocus, beginning a longstanding relationship which has seen continued collaboration between the two groups. The Procussions have featured on two tracks with Hocus Pocus, "Hip Hop?" (from their 2005 release, 73 Touches), and "Vocab!" (from their gold-selling 2007 album, Place 54). Mr J. and Stro also featured on their 2010 release, 16 Pièces, contributing to the tracks "Signes de Temps" and "I Wanna Know." 20Syl from Hocus Pocus has featured on and remixed a track for Mr J's solo work, and guests on the track "Phantasm" from The Procussions' 2013 eponymous release.

=== 2007–2008 ===
In 2007, The Procussions took a break to allow members to pursue solo interests. During this period, Mr J. released his solo debut, Of Gods and Girls, on Rawkus on July 24, 2007, and Rez left the group to pursue his interests in graphic design, web design, and photography. In early 2008, Mr J and Stro decided to officially disband The Procussions and continue with their solo work.

=== 2009–2012 ===
In the years that followed, Mr. J. actively pursued a solo career, forming his own label, De Medeiros, in 2009. That year he released an EP, The Art of Broken Glass, featuring production from Boonie Mayfield, and his second album, Friends Enemies Apples Apples, with production from Stro Elliot. In 2011, he released Saudade, which he co-produced with Stro Elliot and Luke Atencio as "The Stare". They again collaborated on his 2012 EP, Pale Blue Dot, which included a remix of the title track by 20Syl of Hocus Pocus featuring Canadian rapper Shad, for which Mr J. received a 2013 International Portuguese Music Award. In 2012 he released a series of singles: "The Rockies" (a tribute to his home state of Colorado), "Two Light Beams," "I Hate My Job" (featuring Stro), "The Marquee,"and "Tricycle" (featuring Relic and Rational). The singles were produced by Stro and later collected as The Rockies EP.

Aside from his collaborations with Mr J., Stro continued working as an independent producer, providing beats to artists such as Raashan Ahmad, Sareem (Sharlok) Poems, One Block Radius, Wrekonize, Phonte, and Othello. On July 26, 2011, he released Stro's Old Beat Farm, a collection of 18 hip hop instrumentals composed from 2004 to 2011. In 2012 he provided the score for a short film, Victor, by filmmaker Hilton Carter. He is also providing scores for a series of short animations by Carter called Lessons.

=== 2012-2014 ===
In 2012, after several offers from promoters and requests from friends, family and fans, Mr J. and Stro reunited as The Procussions for a show in Colorado. When the show generated renewed interest from fans internationally and in the US, they began to discuss recording a new album. On September 12, 2012, they launched an Indiegogo campaign to raise the needed funds. The campaign raised nearly double its intended goal, and on April 11, 2013, the self-titled album was released to the campaign's supporters. On April 24, 2013, five tracks from the album were made available as The Procussions EP on limited edition vinyl and by digital download. The album contains features from Shad, ¡Mayday!, 20Syl (of Hocus Pocus), and Italian trumpeter J. Kyle Gregory. The album saw public release in Europe via Yotanka on September 16, 2013, and in the US on September 23, 2013. Since completing the recording, The Procussions have continued to perform, completing two European tours with DJ Manwell and announcing the booking of a US tour for late 2013 and early 2014. In 2014 The Pro-Exclusive EP was released featuring six previously unreleased songs and their instrumentals.

=== 2015-Present ===
Mr. J. Medeiros formed an Electronic Hip Hop group with 20Syl called AllttA and is also working as lead vocalist/songwriter in Punk-Rap group KNIVES.

Stro Elliot is releasing solo material and also working with a number of artists/projects including The Roots, The Hamilton Mixtape, J. Period, and Jazzy Jeff.

== Discography ==
=== Studio albums ===
Title	Album details
As Iron Sharpens Iron	Release date: October 28, 2003; Label: Basementalism
5 Sparrows for 2 Cents	Release date: May 30, 2006; Label: Rawkus
The Procussions	Release date: September 23, 2013; Label: Procussions

=== EPs ===
Title	EP Details
Up All Night	Release date: September 20, 2004; Label: Miclife
The Procussions EP	Release date: April 24, 2013; Label: Procussions

=== Singles ===
Year	Single	Album
2002	"Leave Her Alone"	As Iron Sharpens Iron
2002	"All That It Takes"	As Iron Sharpens Iron
2004	"Celebration"	As Iron Sharpens Iron
2006	"The Storm"	5 Sparrows for 2 Cents
2006	"Miss January"	5 Sparrows for 2 Cents
2013	"Today"	The Procussions
2013	"The Fringe"	The Procussions
2013	"On A Mountain"	The Procussions

== In other media ==
The Procussions have had their music included in TV, film, and video games. In 2026, their song “The Storm” was included on Netflix’s “Man on Fire” season 1, episode 2. In 2006, their song "Little People" was included on the soundtrack for the film American Gun. In 2010, it also appeared (along with "The Storm") in the television series Blue Mountain State (misidentified as "Sounds of the T.V." and "The War"). Their song "Shabach" was included on the soundtrack for 2K Sports' College Hoops 2K7, and "Fight Here" appeared in EA's Facebreaker. In 2006, Mr J. Medeiros appeared on the T.V. program Miami Ink, speaking about The Procussions and his song "Constance", and receiving an upper back tattoo reading "Forgive Us".
