= Saudade LP =

Studio album by Mr. J. Medeiros
- Released: September 1, 2011
- Genre: Underground hip hop
- Label: DeMedeiros
- Producer: Mr. J. Medeiros, Stro Elliot, Luke Atencio

Mr. J. Medeiros chronology
Friends Enemies Apples Apples (2009)	Saudade LP (2011)	Pale Blue Dot EP (2012)

Professional ratings
Review scores
Source	Rating
Wordisbond.com	4.25/5 stars
Okayplayer.com	4.5/5 stars
URB.com	4/5 stars

Saudade LP is a solo album by rapper producer Mr. J. Medeiros. It was released in 2011.

== Track listing ==
1. "Fear and Safety" (featuring Bekah Wagner)
2. "Saudade"
3. "The Weak End"
4. "Nothing Without Providence"
5. "Depression is a Liar"
6. "Stand Down" (featuring A Mouse Named Wolf)
7. "I'll Take It"
8. "Swallow" (featuring Logan)
9. "The Sailor"
10. "So" (featuring J Kyle Gregory)
11. "Neon Signs" (featuring Stro Elliot)
12. "Serious" (featuring Stro Elliot)
13. "THis is Not a Home"
14. "Shower Curtains (featuring J Kyle Gregory)
