= Of Gods and Girls =

Studio album by Mr. J. Medeiros
- Released: July 24, 2007
- Genre: Underground hip hop
- Label: Rawkus Records
- Producer: Mr. J. Medeiros, Illmind, Stro Elliot, 20syl, Joe Beats, Headnodic, Ohmega Watts

Mr. J. Medeiros chronology
Of Gods and Girls (2007)	The Art of Broken Glass EP (2009)

Professional ratings
Review scores
Source	Rating
HipHopDX.com	4.25/5 stars
Okayplayer.com	4.5/5 stars
Allhiphop.com	4.5/5 stars

Of Gods and Girls is a solo album by rapper and producer Mr. J. Medeiros. It was released in 2007.

== Track listing ==
1. "Amelie" (featuring 20syl)
2. "Silent Earth"
3. "Strangers"
4. "Constance"
5. "Change" (featuring Strange Fruit Project and Rez)
6. "King of Rock Bottom"
7. "Half A Dream" (featuring Marty James)
8. "Keep Pace"
9. "Money" (featuring Pigeon John)
10. "Her Wings"
11. "Apathy"
12. "Call You"
13. "Honest Mans Hustle"
14. "Constance (Joe Beats Remix)"
15. "Silent Earth (Ohmega Watts Remix)"
16. "Keep Pace (Stro Remix)"
