= Down the Road (C2C song) =

Single by C2C

from the album Tetra
- Released: 25 June 2012
- Recorded: 2012
- Length: 3:25
- Label: On And On, Mercury
- Songwriter(s): Sylvain Richard, Guillaume Jaulin, Thomas Le Vexier, Pierre Forestier et Arnaud Fradin

Music video
- "Down the Road" on YouTube

"Down the Road" is a song by the French electronic music band C2C that was released on 25 June 2012 on the On And On. Taken from the same-titled EP Down the Road (2012), the song was written by Sylvain Richard, Guillaume Jaulin, Thomas Le Vexier, Pierre Forestier and Arnaud Fradin. The single reached the top of the SNEP chart, the official French Singles Chart. It was also a hit in Belgium and the Netherlands. The single also appears on the band debut album Tetra also released in 2012.

C2C sampled the vocals from Eddie Cusic's, “You Don't Have to Go” for "Down the Road".

== Music video ==
The music video features New Zealand pro skateboarder Richie Jackson.

== Charts ==
=== Weekly charts ===
Chart (2012–13)	Peak position
Belgium (Ultratip Bubbling Under Flanders)	53
Belgium (Ultratop 50 Wallonia)	9
Canada (Canadian Hot 100)	66
France (SNEP)	1
Netherlands (Single Top 100)	97
Switzerland (Schweizer Hitparade)	36
US Hot Dance/Electronic Songs (Billboard)	25
US Alternative Airplay (Billboard)	27

=== Year-end charts ===
Chart (2012)	Position
Belgium (Ultratop Wallonia)	46
France (SNEP)	16
Chart (2013)	Position
France (SNEP)	87
US Hot Dance/Electronic Songs (Billboard)	65
