= Tetra (album) =

Studio album by C2C
- Released: 3 September 2012
- Recorded: 2012
- Genre: Trip hop, electronica
- Length: 60:45
- Label: On and On
- Producer: Damien Bolo

C2C chronology
| Down the Road (EP) | Tetra |

Singles from Tetra
- 1. "Down the Road" Released: 25 June 2012; 2. "The Cell" Released: 2012; 3. "Happy (feat. Derek Martin)" Released: 2012

Tetra (stylised as Tetr4) is the first album from the French electronic music group C2C. It was released on September 3, 2012 off the On And On label. The album reached the top of the French chart from September 3, 2012 to September 9, 2012 and "Down the Road" peaked at 27 on Hot Modern Rock Tracks.

== Track listing ==
1. "The Cell" - 4:59
2. "Down the Road" - 3:27
3. "Kings Season (feat. Rita J. & Moongaï)" - 3:51
4. "Because of You (feat. Pigeon John)" - 3:42
5. "Delta" - 3:44
6. "Who Are You (feat. Olivier Daysoul)" - 4:51
7. "Happy (feat. Derek Martin)" - 3:55
8. "Give Up the Ghost (feat. Jay-Jay Johanson)" - 5:24
9. "The Beat" - 3:32
10. "Genius (feat. Gush)" - 4:10
11. "Together (feat. Ledeunff and Blitz the Ambassador)" - 4:51
12. "Arcades" - 4:24
13. "Le Banquet (feat. Tigerstyle, Netik, Rafik, Vajra & KENTARO)" - 4:56
14. "F-U-Y-A" - 5:05

=== Deluxe Edition bonus tracks ===
The deluxe edition includes four remix tracks.

1. "Together" (Neck Breakin' Edit) - 4:31
2. "Down the Road" (Acoustic Cover) (featuring Bernhoft) - 4:50
3. "Shout" (C2C Remix) (featuring Bernhoft) - 4:33
4. "Give Up the Ghost" (Vintage Edit) (featuring Jay-Jay Johanson) - 4:01

== Charts ==
=== Weekly charts ===
| Chart (2012–13) | Peak position |
|---|---|
| Belgian Albums (Ultratop Flanders) | 87 |
| Belgian Albums (Ultratop Wallonia) | 12 |
| Dutch Albums (Album Top 100) | 74 |
| French Albums (SNEP) | 1 |
| Swiss Albums (Schweizer Hitparade) | 35 |

=== Year-end charts ===
| Chart (2012) | Position |
|---|---|
| French Albums (SNEP) | 25 |
| Chart (2013) | Position |
| Belgian Albums (Ultratop Wallonia) | 137 |
| French Albums (SNEP) | 59 |
