= Stro Elliot =

American multi-instrumentalist in The Roots

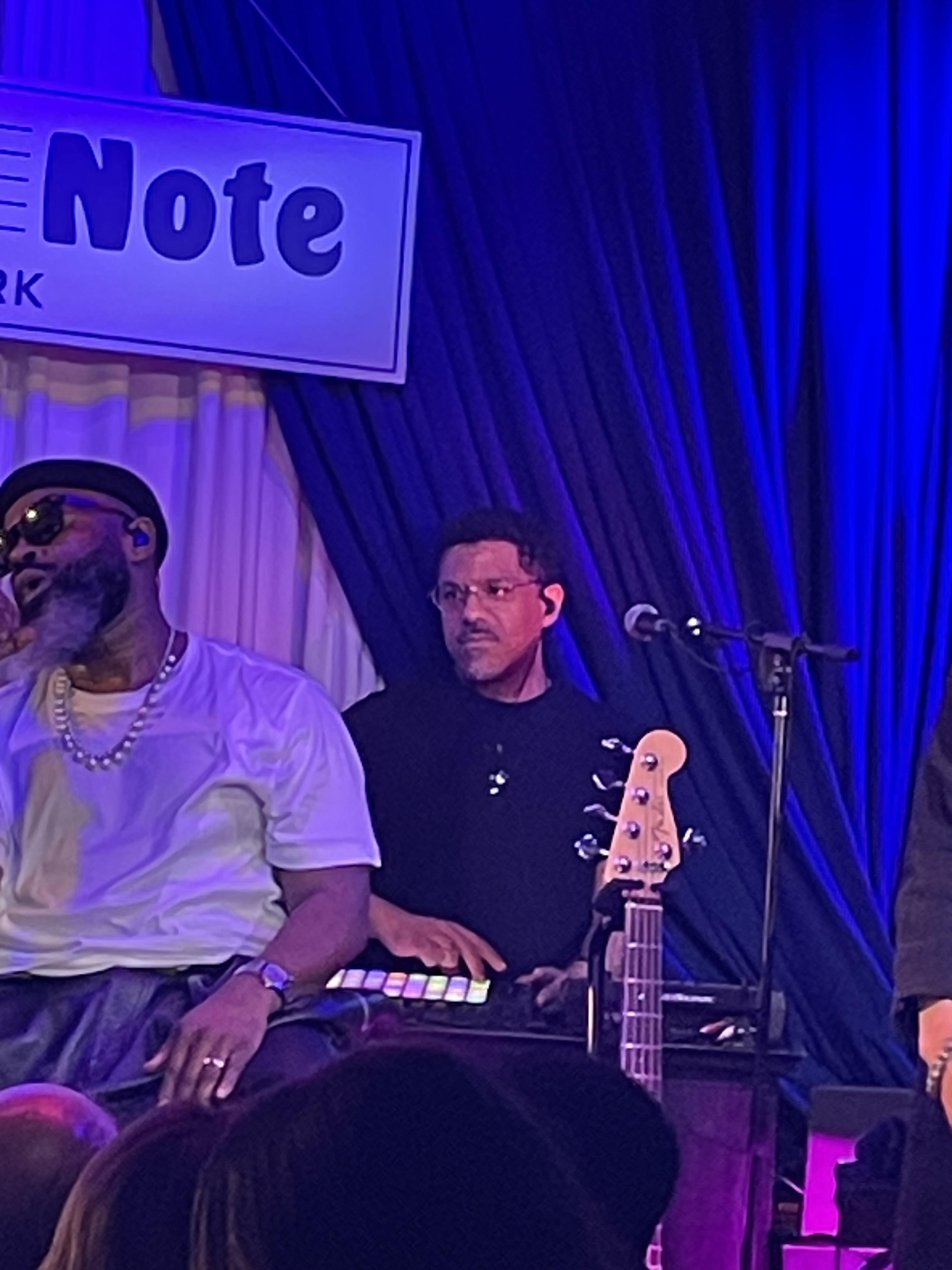
- Stro Elliot (right) with Black Thought and The Roots at The Blue Note NYC in 2025

Background information
- Also known as: The 89th Key
- Born: Brian Roberson
- Genres: Hip hop; Neo soul; Funk; Jazz; Jazz fusion; Rock
- Occupation: Musician
- Member of: The Roots, The Tonight Show Band
- Formerly of: The Procussions
- Website: www.stroelliot.com

Brian Roberson, known professionally as Stro Elliot, is an American record producer and multi-instrumentalist. He is currently a member of the hip hop band The Roots, having joined the band in 2017. Elliot plays keyboards, percussion, and does sampling with The Roots in the house band for The Tonight Show Starring Jimmy Fallon. As a multi-instrumentalist, Stro employs elements of beatbox, percussion, sampling, tambourine, finger drumming, and keyboards.

Elliot was living in Los Angeles, CA for fifteen years before joining The Roots in 2017 after being invited by Questlove. He has cited DJ Jazzy Jeff as one of his mentors, who encouraged him to take the job on The Tonight Show.

Stro Elliot was an original member of The Procussions, an underground rap group that formed in 1998 in Colorado Springs, along with Mr. J. Medeiros, Resonant (aka Rez), Qq, and Vise Versa. The Procussions toured with Common, the Pharcyde, Xzibit, Talib Kweli, Mos Def, Run-DMC and Ugly Duckling.

Elliot is a classically trained musician, who grew up playing guitar, piano, trumpet, and drums.

== Discography ==
=== Albums ===
- La Villa, Def Pressé Editions, 2023
- Black & Loud: James Brown Reimagined by Stro Elliot, Republic Records, 2022
- Stro's Old Beat Farm, Street Corner Music, 2022
- Stro Elliot, Street Corner Music, 2016

=== As featured on ===
- "Stay Alive (Interlude)" (J.Period and Stro Elliot), On The Hamilton Mixtape, Atlantic, 2016

== See also ==
- The Procussions
- The Roots
