= The Sound Providers =

American hip-hop group

- Origin: San Diego, California, United States
- Genres: Hip-hop instrumental hip-hop
- Years active: 1998–2010
- Labels: Quarternote; ABB Records
- Members: Jason Skills; Soulo; Profile

The Sound Providers was an American record production duo composed of Jason Skills and Soulo. Formed in 1998 in San Diego, California, it originally included a third member, a rapper named Profile, who left the group shortly after they were signed by ABB Records.

== Career ==
The Sound Providers produced a number of singles before releasing their debut album An Evening with the Sound Providers in 2004 on Quarternote/ABB Records. The album features guest appearances from Asheru, The Procussions, Wee Bee Foolish, Maspyke and Little Brother.

In 2005 they released another album titled Looking Backwards: 2001-1998, which is a compilation of songs made when Profile was still a member of the group, some of which were released as 12" singles from 1998-2001. The album also includes a number of previously unreleased songs.

In 2006, The Pros released a collaboration album with rapper Surreal titled True Indeed. The first single "Just Gettin' Started/Place To Be" was released in June of the same year.

Also in 2006, The SP’s remixed the Kero One track "Give Thanks" (featuring Niamaj). The remix was released as a B-side to Kero One's “In All The Wrong Places” single.

== Discography ==
Albums

- An Evening with the Sound Providers (2004)
- Looking Backwards: 2001-1998 (2005)
- True Indeed (with Surreal) (2006)
- An Instrumental with The Sound Providers (2010)

Singles

- "Dope Transmission" / "The Field" (1998)
- "Get Down" / "No Time" (1999)
- "The Difference" / Yes Y'all" (2000)
- "Who Am I" (2001)
- "The Throwback" / "Braggin and Boastin" (2004)
- "Street Keys" / "Apples" (2004)
- "For Old Times Sake" / "The Throwback (Remix)" (2004)
- "The Blessin" / "Who Said What" (featuring Blest) (2004)
- "Its Gonna Bee Part II" / "5 Minutes (Remix)" (2005)
- "Just Gettin' Started" / "Place To Be" (with Surreal) (2006)
- "Nuff Said" / "They Call Me" (with Surreal) (2007)
