= Møme =

French DJ from Nice (born 1989)

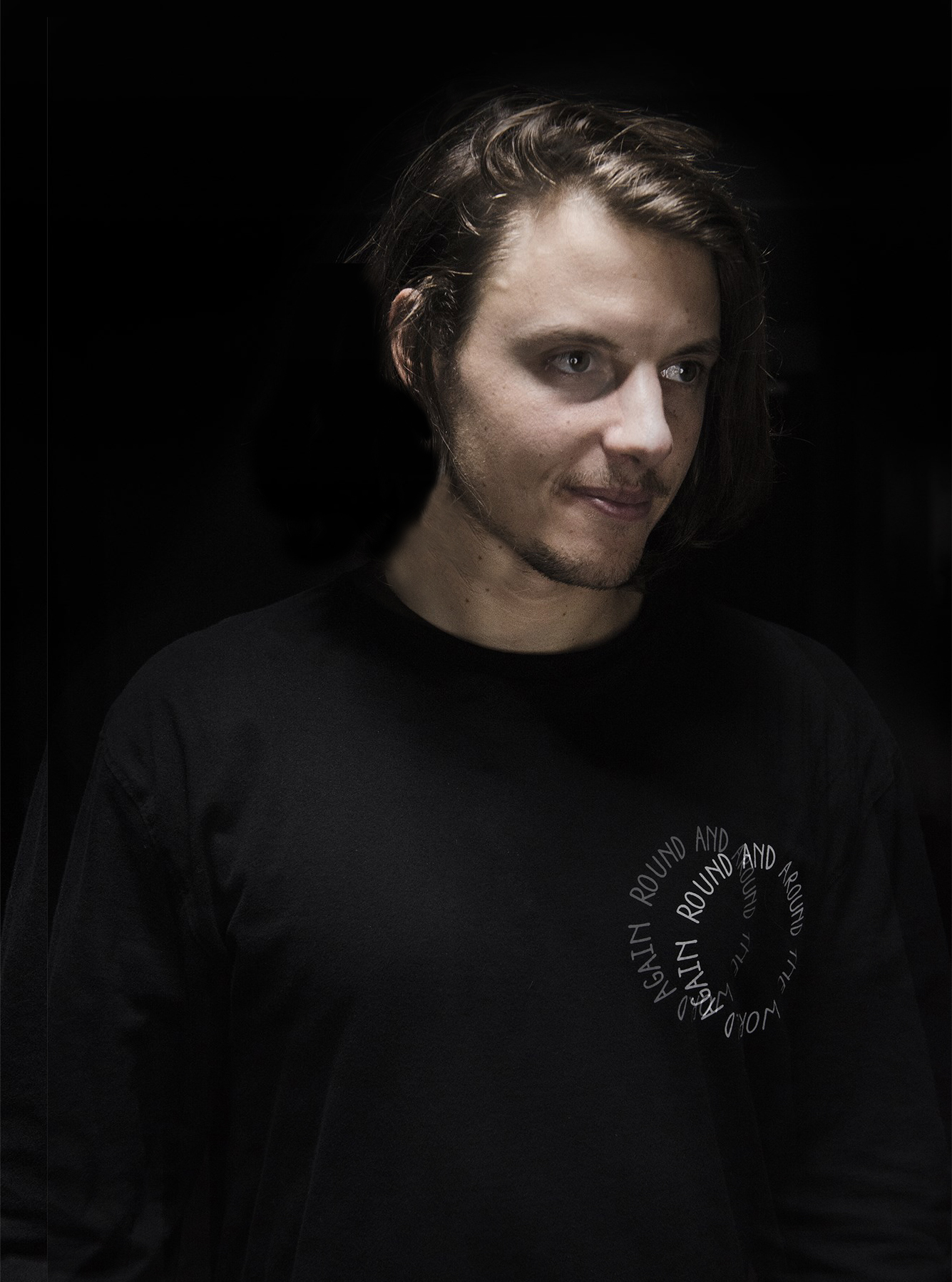

Møme (born 28 July 1989 as Jérémy Souillart) is a French DJ from Nice. His most successful single was "Aloha", which charted at a peak of 10 in France. In October 2016, Møme was confirmed to play at the 31st edition of Eurosonic Noorderslag in Groningen, NL.

== Discography ==
=== Albums ===
Title	Year	Peak chart positions		
Title	Year	FRA	BEL (FL)	SWI
Panorama	2016	85	169	—
Flashback FM (with Ricky Ducati)	2021	—	—	—

=== Singles ===
Title	Year	Peak chart positions			Album
Title	Year	FRA	BEL (FL)	SWI	Album
"Aloha" (featuring Merryn Jeann)	2015	9	1	43	Non-album singles
"Hold On" (featuring Dylan Wright)	2016	58	—	—	Non-album singles
"Playground"	2016	161	—	—	Panorama
"Alive" (vs. Midnight to Monaco)	2016	122	—	—	Panorama
"Take Off (Coca-Cola Summer 2017)"	2017	193	—	—	Non-album singles
"Gravitation" (with Petit Biscuit featuring Isaac Delusion)	2017	24	—	—	Presence

=== Promotional Singles ===
Title	Year	Peak chart positions			Album
Title	Year	FRA	BEL (FL)	SWI	Album
"Ezio's Family" (Møme Remix)	2022	—	—	—	Non-album singles
