= Grems =

- Born: Michaël Eveno; 25 October 1978 (age 47)
- Origin: Bordeaux
- Genres: French hip hop
- Occupations: Rapper, record producer, designer, graffiti artist
- Website: http://www.gremsindustry.com/

Michaël Eveno, better known by his stage name Grems (born 25 October 1978), is a French rapper and producer of French hip hop and a designer.

He made his debut in the group Hustla alongside Le Jouage (of the band Gravité Zéro) and Dj Steady.

== Discography ==
=== Solo albums ===
- 2004: Algèbre (De Brazza Records)
- 2006: Airmax (Deephop)
- 2009: Sea, Sex And Grems (Deephop)
- 2010: Brokabilly (Grems Industry)
- 2011: Algèbre 2.0
- 2013: Vampire
- 2014: Buffy
- 2016: Green Pisse
- 2018: Sans Titre #7
- 2024: Algèbre 3.0

=== Hustla ===
- 2001: Paris-Bordeaux-Vitry
- 2002: Sonophrologie
- 2015: Ascenseur Émotionnel

=== Olympe Mountain ===
- 2005: La Montagne Ça Vous Gagne

=== Rouge à Lèvres ===
- 2005: Maquille-Toi
- 2008: Démaquille-Toi

=== PMPDJ ===
- 2011: Pour Ma Paire De Jordan
- 2012: Haterville

=== Klub Sandwich ===
- 2011: Les Valcheuzes

=== Mixtape ===
- 2012: 1978-5713

=== Singles ===
- 2002: Microbe
- 2004: Merdeuse
- 2004: Fonkyclapin' feat. Booba Boobsa
- 2005: Le Masque Et La Plume feat. Olympe Mountain
- 2005: Reste Beatum feat. Rouge à Lèvres
- 2005: Ouai Ouai feat. Rouge à Lèvres
- 2006: Pisse De Flûte feat. Sept & Le Jouage
- 2006: Rakaille Numerik
- 2006: Airmax
- 2007: J'te Baise feat. Gero
- 2007: Gash feat. Disiz La Peste & Orifice Vulgatron
- 2007: Casse Ton Boule
- 2008: Deepkho feat. Rouge à Lèvres
- 2008: Hit That G@sh (Primecuts Re-Rub)
- 2009: Guedin feat. NT4
- 2009: Sec Ma Gueule feat. Set&Match
- 2009: Dimanche
- 2010: Rencontre Avec Un Ballon
- 2010: Bisou
- 2010: Guacha feat. Micro Coz, Son Of Kick, Disiz & Natalia Clavier
- 2010: Miki
- 2010: Broka Billy feat. Foreign Beggars
- 2010: Boloss feat. Ill
- 2011: My Name Is Michael Barbu
- 2011: Joli Village feat. Klub Sandwich
- 2011: Voodoo feat. Kussay, Bunk & Greg Frite
- 2011: Usla feat. PMPDJ
- 2011: A Nous Les Manettes feat. Djunz, Kussay & Nemir
- 2011: Hummer feat. Didaï & Rimcash
- 2011: Les Vrais feat. Nekfeu
- 2011: Klub Sandwich feat. Klub Sandwich
- 2011: Toast feat. Starlion
