= Deluxe (band) =

French musical band

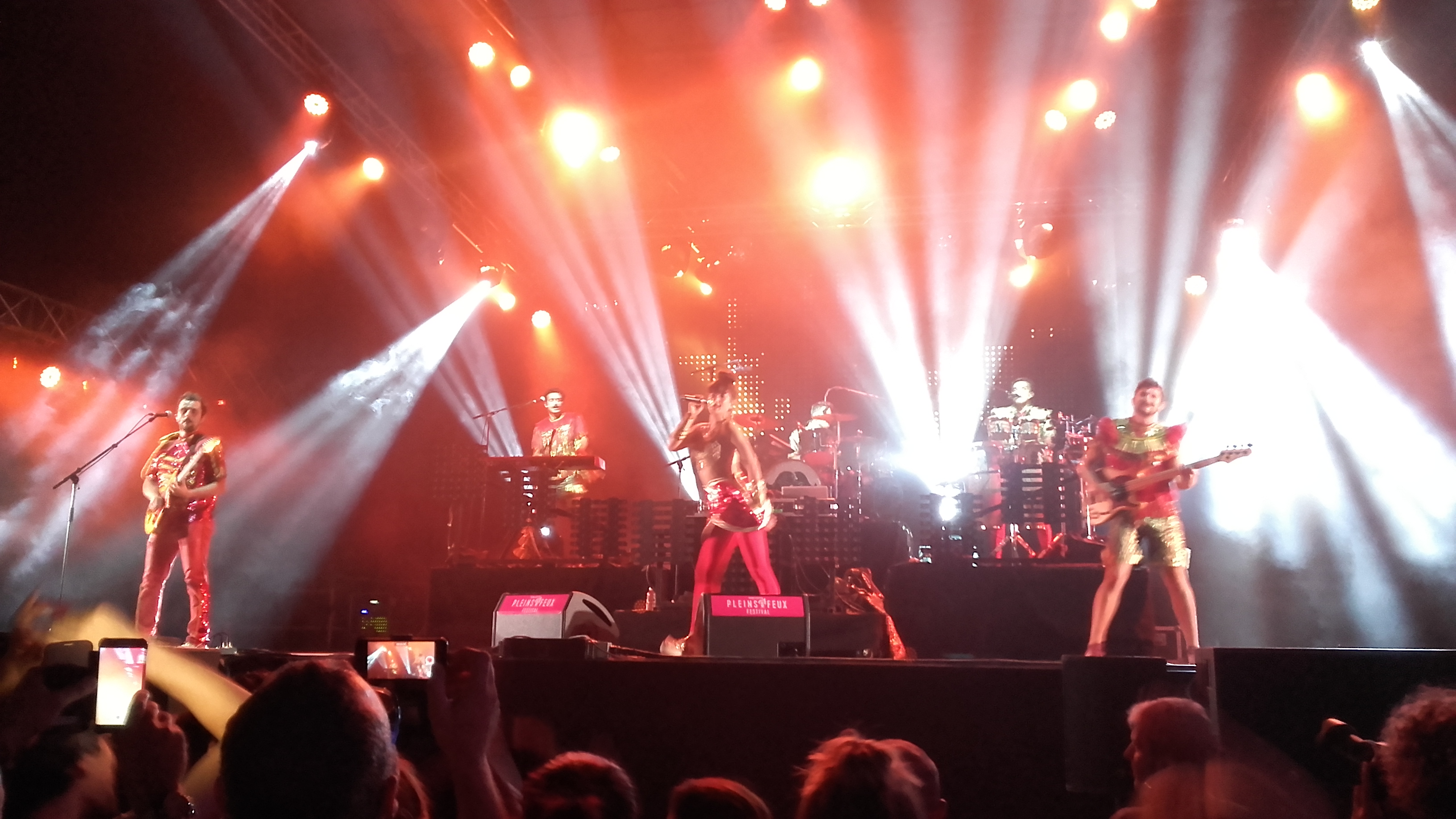
- Deluxe in 2016

Background information
- Also known as: Deluxe Moustache
- Origin: Aix-en-Provence, France
- Genres: Electro; hip hop; pop; funk; jazz; electro swing
- Years active: 2007–present
- Labels: Nanana Production, Polydor Records , Chinese Man
- Members: Kaya (Simon Caillat); Pépé (Clément Barba); Pietre (Pierre Coll); Lili Boy (Elisa Pascale Poublan); Soubri (Sacha Bertocchi); Kilo (Vianney Elineau)

Deluxe is a French band formed in 2007 in Aix-en-Provence.

== Biography ==
Deluxe was discovered by the band Chinese Man in 2007 in Aix-en-Provence, where they were performing on public streets. Deluxe started as 3 childhood friends, guitarist Pierre Coll, bassist Simon "Kaya" Caillat and drummer Vianney "Kilo" Elineau who were passionate about music, and eventually became a group of five after adding saxophonist and keyboardist Sacha "Soubri" Bertocchi and percussionist Clément "Pepe" Barba to the lineup the same year. In December 2010 the band met a singer/rapper named Elisa Pascale Poublan aka "Liliboy" with whom they collaborated, and eventually added to the band's lineup full-time. With the addition of Liliboy, the band became a more successful live act in France and other nearby European countries. The band lists their influences as "Beat Assailant, The Roots, General Elektriks, Cannonball Adderley, Matthieu Chedid, Gainsbourg and many more". Their live performances are characterized by using many different instruments and working each one into the mix. "Rhodes, guitar, bass, horns, you can expect a really complete live music experience when you see us on stage." They have moustaches for a symbol—all the boys have moustaches and Liliboy usually wears a moustache-shaped skirt. During the COVID-19 pandemic, Deluxe recorded an album of live songs selected from previous albums and performed from their homes during the isolation and released it as En Confinement in July 2020. Deluxe's newest single "Michael" was released to streaming services on February 14th, 2025

== Band members ==
Current members

- Liliboy (Elisa Pascale Poublan) – vocals (2010–present)
- Kaya (Simon Caillat) – bass, MPC (2007–present)
- Kilo (Vianney Elineau) – drums, turntables (2007–present)
- Pietre (Pierre Coll) – guitar, keyboards (2007–present)
- Soubri (Sacha Bertocchi) – miscellaneous percussion, MPC MIDI (2007–present)
- Pepe (Clément Barba) – saxophone, trumpet, keyboards (2007–present)

== Discography ==
=== Studio albums ===
- The Deluxe Family Show (Chinese Man Records, 2013)
- Stachelight (Chinese Man Records, 2016)
- Boys & Girl (NANANA Production, 2019)
- Boys & Girl (Suite et fin) (NANANA Production, 2020)
- Moustache Gracias (Polydor, 2022)
- Ça fait plaisir (NANANA Production, 2025)

=== Live albums ===
- Live à l'Olympia (Chinese Man Records, 2016)
- En Confinement (NANANA Production, 2020)
- Live au Zénith Paris : La Vilette (NANANA Production, 2024)

=== EPs ===
- Polishing Peanuts (Chinese Man Records, 2011)
- Daniel (Chinese Man Records, 2012)
