= Chris Karns =

American turntablist (born 1979)

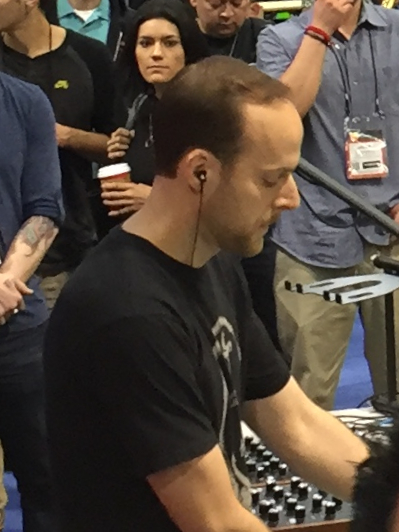
- Chris Karns at 2016 NAMM Show (Rane Corporation booth)

Background information
- Also known as: DJ Vajra
- Born: Christopher Karns; January 25, 1979 (age 47); Colorado, United States
- Origin: Denver, Colorado
- Genres: Dubstep, Funk, Hip hop, Moombahton, Trap, Turntablism
- Occupations: Disc jockey, Producer, Remixer
- Instruments: Turntable, Sampler
- Years active: 1996–present
- Label: Colemine Records
- Website: www.chriskarns.com

Christopher Karns (born January 25, 1979) is an American turntablist, who won the 2011 DMC World DJ Championships. He has also won the 2002 WSTC World Championships, six DMC Regional Championships, and three Redbull Thre3style Championships.

He has produced songs for Method Man, Ahmad, Mayer Hawthorne and many more. Chris has also shared stages around the world with industry legends such as Run-D.M.C., A Tribe Called Quest, Common, Mos Def, Wu-Tang, and many others. He is formerly the official touring DJ for Yelawolf and is a former official band member for Pretty Lights.

In April 2013, he auditioned as one of the nineteen contestants for the third season of VH1's DJ reality show, Master of the Mix. Karns was one of 3 finalist, ultimately placing 2nd in the finals.
