= Solidays =

French music festival

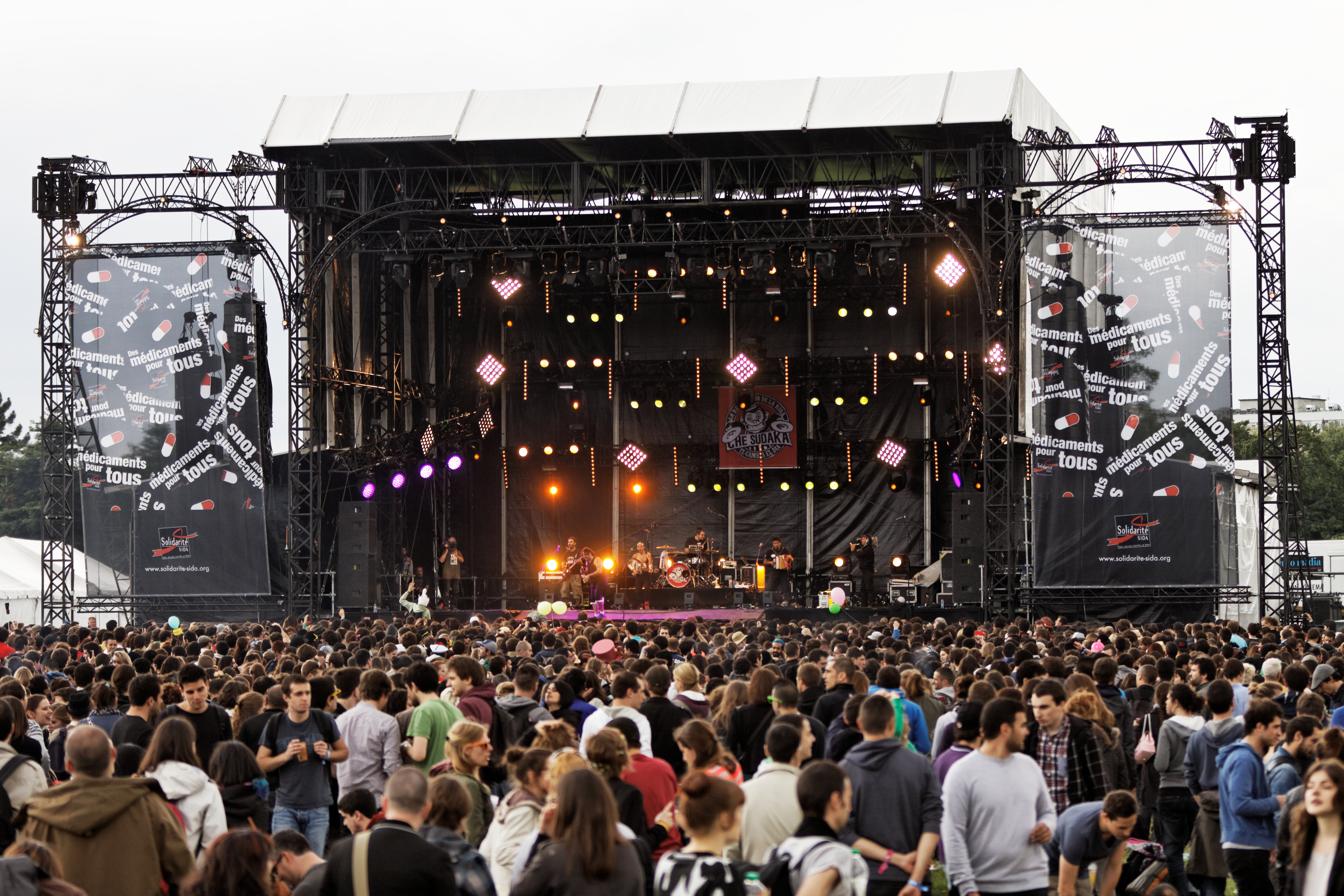
- Main stage of the 2013 edition
- Dates: Mid-June
- Locations: Longchamp Racecourse, Paris, France
- Years active: 1999 – present
- Founders: Luc Barruet
- Website: www.solidays.org//

Solidays (/ˈsɒlɪdeɪz/) is a French annual music festival that takes place at the Longchamp Racecourse in Paris at the end of June. Organized by Solidarité sida (a French HIV/AIDS awareness group for youth), the event brings together more than 150 artists and 170 000 festival-goers for three days (Friday, Saturday and Sunday). The proceeds from the festival are donated to organisations fighting against HIV/AIDS, especially for those focusing on the African continent.

The festival has been held since 1999. The performers involved in Solidays accept a reduced fee or appear for free as a sign of their solidarity. The 2013 edition raised over 2 million euros. The festival also features bungee jumping in addition to the music. The 2022 festival happened on June 24-26.

Over the years, many French and foreign artists have appeared at Solidays, including DJ Snake, Bigflo & Oli, Kungs, Mac Miller, Vanessa Paradis, M83, Synapson, Paul Kalkbrenner, Bénabar, Madeon, Shaka Ponk, David Guetta, Kool & the Gang, Stromae, Louis Bertignac, Lily Allen, Louise Attaque, Grand Corps Malade, Earth, Wind & Fire and Diplo.

== 2020 edition and COVID-19 pandemic ==
On 13 April 2020, the festival announced on its website that the 2020 edition of the festival would be cancelled because of the ongoing COVID-19 pandemic. Luc Barruet, the founder of the festival, asked festival goers not to ask for reimbursement because he said that the cancellation was putting the festival in danger.
