= Hocus Pocus (group) =

French hip hop group

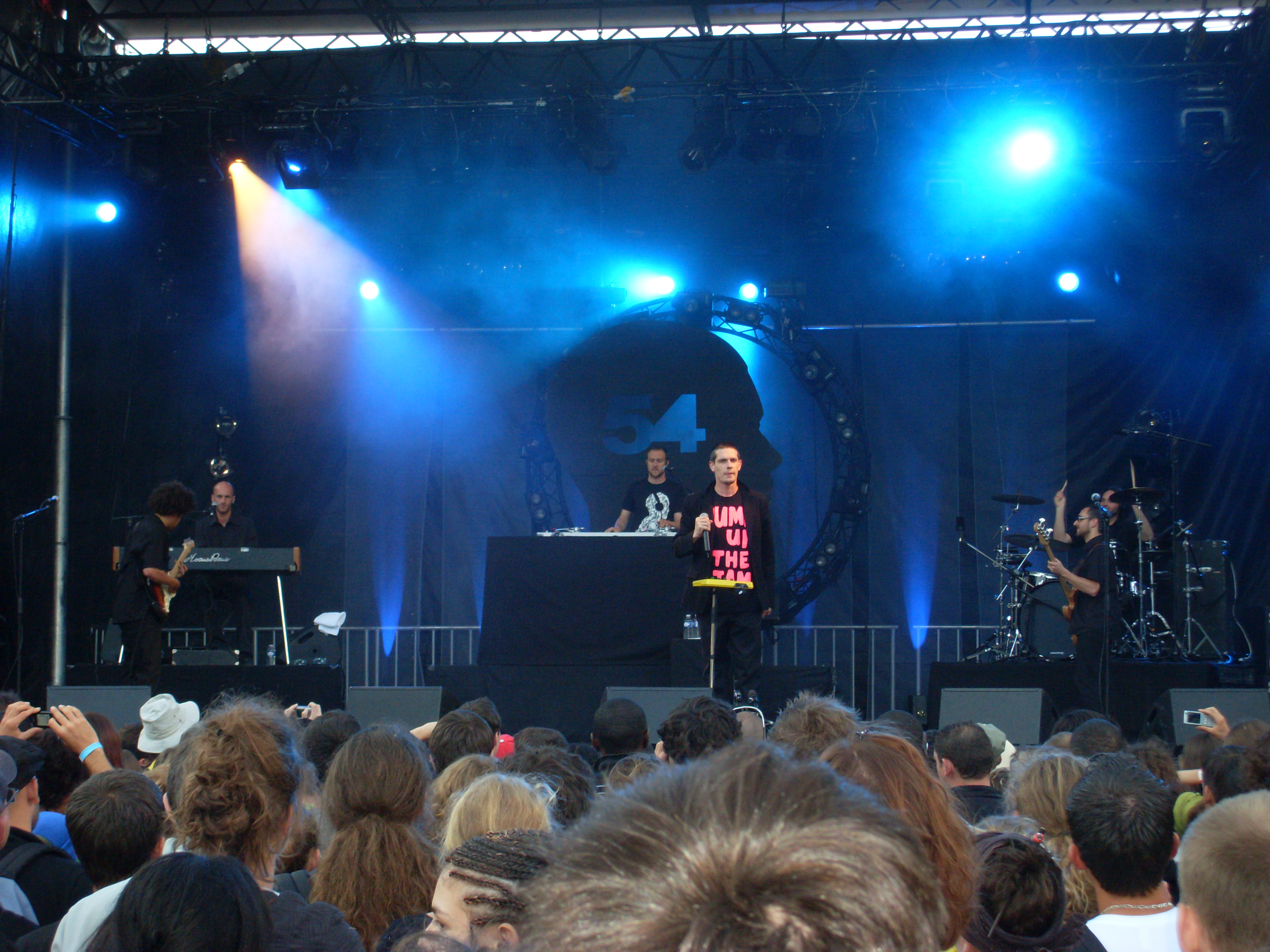

Background information
- Origin: Nantes, France
- Genres: Hip hop, jazz, soul, funk
- Years active: 1995–present
- Labels: On and On Records
- Members: 20syl DJ Greem; David Le Deunff; Antoine Saint-Jean; Hervé Godard; Matthieu Lelièvre
- Past members: Cambia; Yves-Dominique Richard; Yannick Busi

Hocus Pocus is a French hip hop / jazz band from Nantes. Formed in 1995, their music is a mix of hip hop, jazz, soul and funk. Originally being 20syl's brainchild, Hocus Pocus was formed in 1995, and gradually gained attention in the late '90s. The band, however, reached significant commercial and critical success in 2006 with the re-release of 2005 LP 73 Touches, the "Hip Hop?" single (featuring The Procussions) having hooked many listeners who were curious about its blend of French, English, and acoustic/electronic elements. Though quite far removed from legendary bands evolving in that same category (like The Roots), Hocus Pocus' more radio-friendly recipe happened to be very effective. The band came back in 2007 with a mixed live/studio LP, Place 54, featuring more international collaborations and another hit single, "Vocab!".

== Members ==
=== 20syl ===
20syl (real name Sylvain Richard), the MC of the band, got his name from switching the "syl" and "vain" in his name to form "vainsyl". The number 20 in French, "vingt", pronounced "vain", was then substituted in for "vain", creating "20syl". He has also worked on individual projects, including the release of a solo EP Motifs in 2014, which included his collaboration with Oddisee, resulting in a charting single, "Ongoing Thing". Motifs II was released in 2015.

=== Members ===
- 20syl
- Matthieu Lelièvre – guitar
- Hervé Godard – bass
- Antoine Saint-Jean – drums
- DJ Greem – DJ

Earlier members included Cambia, Yves-Dominique Richard and Yannick Busi.

== Discography ==
=== Albums ===
Year	Album	Peak positions			Certification
Year	Album	FR	BEL (Wa)	SWI	Certification
1998	Seconde Formule	–	–	–	
2002	Acoustic Hip Hop Quintet	–	–	–	
2005	73 Touches	103	–	–	
2007	Place 54	13	–	–	
2010	16 Pièces	13	76	59	

=== Maxi singles ===
- "On and On" (October 2001)
- "Conscient" (January 2003)
- "On and On – Part 2" (December 2004)

=== Collaborations ===
Year	Single	Peak positions	Album
Year	Single	FR	Album
2010	"À mi-chemin" (feat. Akhenaton & Ben l'Oncle Soul	70	

== Discography: 20syl ==
=== EPs ===
Year	Album	Peak positions
Year	Album	FR
2014	Motifs (EP)	102
2015	Motifs II (EP)	113

=== Singles ===
Year	Single	Peak positions	Album
Year	Single	FR	Album
2014	"Ongoing Thing" (feat. Oddisee)	172	Motifs (EP)
