= Rock en Seine =

Annual music festival in France

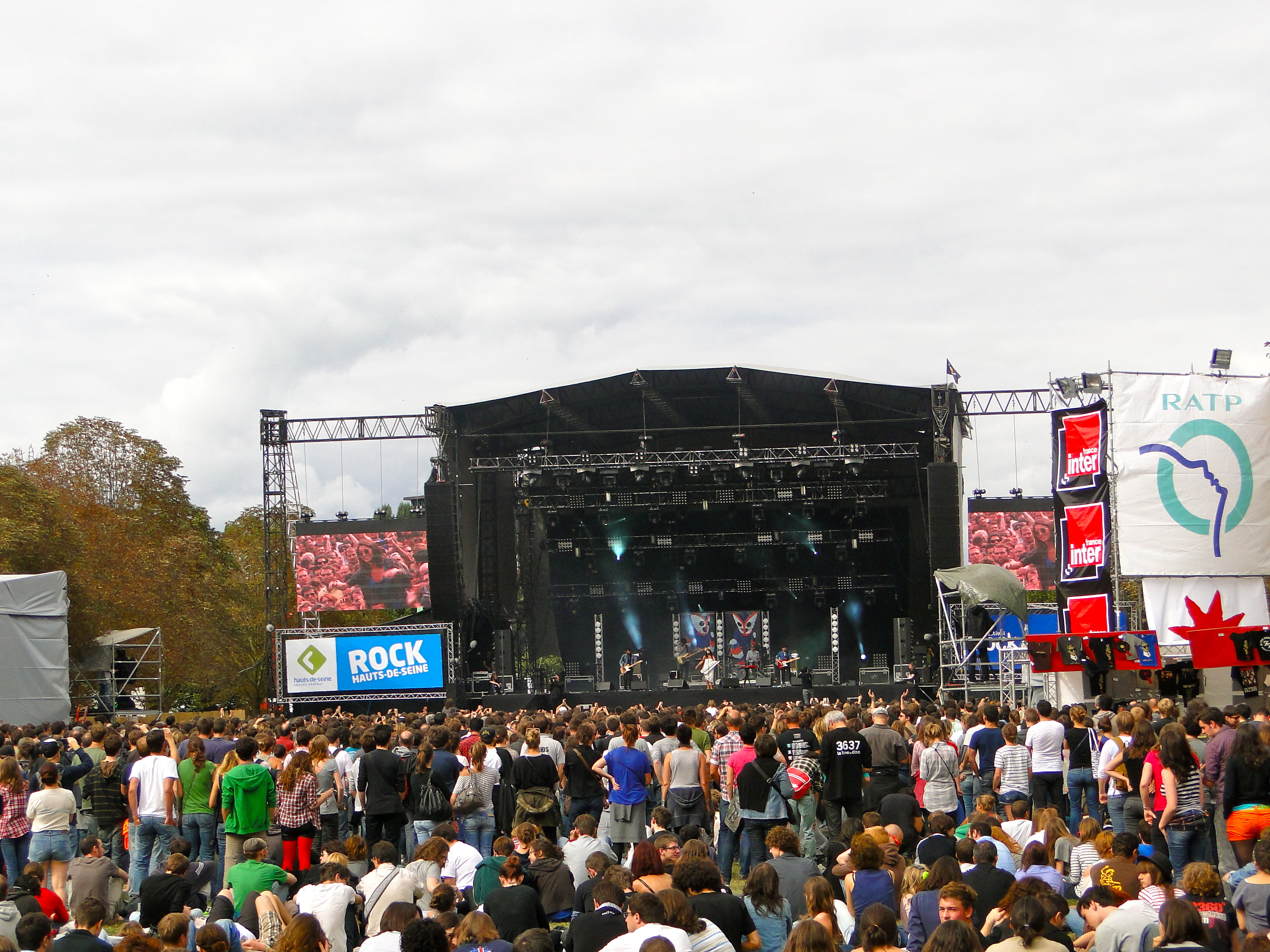
- Dates: Annually, end of August
- Location: Parc de Saint-Cloud
- Years active: 2003–present
- Founders: François Missonnier; Salomon Hazot; Christophe Davy
- Attendance: 40,000 a day since 2013
- Website: rockenseine.com

Rock en Seine (French pronunciation: [ʁɔk ɑ̃ sɛn]) is a multiple-day rock music festival, held at Domaine National de Saint-Cloud, the Château de Saint-Cloud's park, west of Paris, inside the garden designed by André Le Nôtre.

== Name ==
The name is a pun, based on exactly the same pronunciation in French of the words scène meaning 'stage' and Seine (the river separating Saint-Cloud from Central Paris after which the Hauts-de-Seine département is called).

== History ==
- 2003: Birth of Rock en Seine on 27 August, with two stages and ten bands.
- 2004: The festival extends over two days. It welcomes new artistic forms with Rockfolio, Rock en Strophes and Rock en Clips.
- 2005: The festival site gets bigger: the third stage appears, as well as a campsite.
- 2007: The festival extends over three days.
- 2010: 105 000 people attending to this edition.
- 2011: The fourth stage is emerging.
- 2014: 120 000 people attending to this edition. The new stage named "Ile-de-France" hosts the Avant-Seine's bands.
- 2017: Sarah Schmitt becomes the new director of the festival. The festival welcomes a "Firestone" stage.

=== COVID-19 pandemic: 2020 and 2021 editions ===
On 12 May 2020, it was announced that the 2020 edition of the festival would be cancelled because of the ongoing COVID-19 pandemic. The 2021 edition was also cancelled due to the same reason.

== Previous years ==
- 2003: 1st year, 2 stages, 10 artists, 22,000 spectators
- 2004: 2nd year, extended to Two days, 22 artists, 48,000 spectators
- 2005: 3rd year, Three stages, 30 artists, 46,000 spectators
- 2006: 4th year, Three stages, 30 artists, 57,000 spectators
- 2007: 5th year, extended to Three days, 45 artists, 68,000 spectators
- 2008: Three stages, 34 artists, 76,000 spectators
- 2009: Three stages, 47 artists, 97,000 spectators
- 2010: Three stages, 47 artists, 105,000 spectators
- 2011: Four stages, 63 bands, 105,000 spectators
- 2012: Four stages, 62 artists, 108,000 spectators
- 2013: Four stages, 56 artists, 110,000 spectators
- 2014: Five stages, 65 artists, 120,000 spectators
- 2015: Five stages, 66 artists, 110,000 spectators
- 2016: Five stages, 65 artists, 110,000 spectators
- 2017: Six stages, 78 artists, 110,000 spectators
- 2018: Six stages, 78 artists, 90,000 spectators (to confirm)
- 2019: Five stages, 62 artists, 100,000 spectators
- 2022: Five stages, 58 artists, 150,000 spectators

== The venue ==
The festival takes place in the down of the Park of "Domaine national de Saint-Cloud", a historical place at the gates of Paris, and five minutes from the nearest subway station, métro Boulogne - Pont de Saint-Cloud.

The park and the garden were designed by Le Nôtre in the 17th century, and it is the first park to be classed as a Monument historique in 1994. It is a 4.6 km^{2} park, and there are gardens and forest with basins, thickets, cascades, and statues.

== Avant-Seine ==
In 2005, for its third edition, and with the support of Ile-de-France, Rock en Seine inaugurated "Avant-Seine", a selection of bands from Ile-de-France which join the official programming of the festival. Every year, six selected groups are playing on a stage, and one of their tracks is published on a compilation spread for free.

- 2005: Stuck in the Sound, Flying Pooh, HushPuppies, Herman Düne, Sayag Jazz Machine, Hopper.
- 2006: Rhesus, Dead Pop Club, Daddy Longlegs, Neïmo, French Paradoxe, Fancy.
- 2007: Housse de Racket, Hey Hey My My, Nelson, Pravda, Rodeo Massacre, I Love UFO.
- 2008: Narrow Terence, Brooklyn, The Latitudz, Molecule, Da Brasilians, Fortune.
- 2009: Lilly Wood & The Prick, Hindi Zahra, Cheveu, Gush, Jil Is Lucky, The Tatianas.
- 2010: Success, King of Conspiracy, I Am Un Chien, Quadricolor, Viva & the Diva, Roken is Dodelijk.
- 2011: Frànçois and The Atlas Mountains, Concrete Knives, The Feeling of Love, Myra Lee, Beat Mark, Birdy Hunt.
- 2012: Granville, Owlle, Yeti Lane, The Lanskies, Versus, Hyphen Hyphen.
- 2013: FAUVE, Team Ghost, FI/SHE/S, J.C. Satàn, St. Lô, Wall Of Death.
- 2014: ALB, Dorian Pimpernel, Feu! Chatterton, Jessica93, PEGASE, Petit fantôme.
- 2015: DBFC, VKNG, Forever Pavot, We Are Match, Jeanne Added, Last Train.
- 2016: KillASon, O, Adrien Soleiman, Kaviar Special, Maestro, Théo Lawrence & The Hearts.
- 2017: Inuït, Barbagallo, 99Plajo, Gracy Hopkins, Lysistrata, Therapie Taxi, Rendez-Vous.
- 2018: 8 In Bloom, La Veine, Lily, Yanse, The Cage, Moons

== Musical Acts ==
=== Edition 2003 ===
	Grande Scene	Petite Scene
Wednesday 27 August	K's Choice; Morcheeba; Beck; PJ Harvey; Massive Attack	Uncut; Electric 6; Tanger; Tom McRae; Eagle-Eye Cherry; Keziah Jones

=== Edition 2004 ===
	Grande Scene	Scene de la Cascade
Friday 27 August	Yann Destal; Flogging Molly; The Roots; Sonic Youth; The White Stripes; The Chemical Brothers	Blanche; Wax Poetic; Electrelane; Daniel Darc; Joss Stone
Saturday 28 August	Nosfell; Hoggboy; Buck65; Radio 4; Melissa Auf der Maur^{[A]}; Muse	Kaolin; Colour of Fire; Mr. Vegas; Zero 7; Archive

^{A} Replaced Black Rebel Motorcycle Club

=== Edition 2005 ===
	Grande Scene	Scene de la Cascade	Scene de l'Industrie
Friday 25 August	Michael Franti & Spearhead; Fort Minor; Arcade Fire; Queens of the Stone Age; Pixies	The Subways; Athlete; The Sunday Drivers; Hot Hot Heat; Jurassic 5	Stuck in the Sound; Flying Pooh; HushPuppies; Alkaline Trio; Vitalic
Saturday 26 August	La Phaze; Amp Fiddler; Saïan Supa Crew; Foo Fighters; Franz Ferdinand	Asyl; Goldfrapp; Baby Shambles; Feist; Robert Plant and the Strange Sensation	Hopper; Herman Dune; The Departure; The Film; Sayag Jazz Machine

=== Edition 2006 ===
	Grande Scene	Scene de la Cascade	Scene de l'Industrie
Friday 25 August	Calexico; Nada Surf; Dirty Pretty Things; Patrice; Morrissey	Wolfmother; India Arie; Clap Your Hands Say Yeah; Kasabian ^{[A]}; The Raconteurs	Dead Pop Club; Neïmo; French Paradoxe; TV on the Radio; DJ Shadow
Saturday 26 August	Taking Back Sunday; Phoenix; The Dead 60s; Beck; Radiohead	Broken Social Scene; Xavier Rudd; Skin; The Rakes; Editors	Fancy; Daddy Longlegs; Rhesus; Grand Corps Malade; Tokyo Ska Paradise Orchestra

^{A} Replaced Richard Ashcroft

=== Edition 2007 ===
	Grande Scene	Scene de la Cascade	Scene de l'Industrie
Friday 24 August	Dizzee Rascal; Mogwai; The Shins; The Hives; Arcade Fire	Rock and Roll; Dinosaur Jr; M.I.A.; Émilie Simon; 2 Many DJ's	Rodeo Massacre; Hey Hey My My; Biffy Clyro; The Noisettes; Unkle
Saturday 25 August	The Fratellis; Cold War Kids^{[A]}; Jarvis Cocker; The Jesus and Mary Chain; Tool	Puppetmastaz; Hellogoodbye; Erik Truffaz; C.S.S.; Les Rita Mitsouko	I Love UFO; Pravada; Calvin Harris; Terry Poison; Alpha
Sunday 26 August	Daby Toure^{[B]}; Mark Ronson; Kings of Leon; Faithless; Björk	Bat for Lashes; Devotchka; Kelis; Just Jack; Craig Armstrong	Housse de Racket; Nelson; Albert Hammond Jr.; Bromheads Jacket; Enter Shikari

^{A} Replaced Amy Winehouse
^{B} Replaced The Horrors

=== Edition 2008 ===
	Grande Scene	Scene de la Cascade	Scene de l'Industrie
Wednesday 20 August	Blood Red Shoes; Lostprophets; Mix Master Mike; Rage Against the Machine	N/A	N/A
Thursday 28 August	Apocalyptica; Hot Chip; Serj Tankian; Kaiser Chiefs; R.E.M.	Infadels; These New Puritans; The Do; Dirty Pretty Things; Tricky	The Latitudz; Da Brasilians; Narrow Terence; Plain White T's; Wax Tailor
Friday 29 August	Louis XIV; Scars on Broadway; The Roots; The Raconteurs; The Streets	dbClifford; Jamie Lidell; The Jon Spencer Blues Explosion; Kate Nash; Justice	Molecule; Fortune; Brooklyn; Black Kids

^{A} Were meant to play on the Scene de l'Industrie but were added to the Grande Scene when Amy Winehouse cancelled at the last minute for unknown reasons. She never arrived to the festival site, despite her support musicians being there.

=== Edition 2009 ===
	Grande Scene	Scene de la Cascade	Scene de l'Industrie
Friday 28 August	Just Jack; Asher Roth; Amy Macdonald; Vampire Weekend; Madness^{[A]}	James Hunter; Keane; Yeah Yeah Yeahs; Madness; Bloc Party; Vitalic	The Tatianas; Gush; Passion Pit; Bill Callahan; Oceana
Saturday 29 August	Noisettes; Ebony Bones; Billy Talent; The Offspring; Faith No More	Kitty, Daisy & Lewis; The Asteroids Galaxy Tour; Dananananaykroyd; The Horrors; Calvin Harris; Birdy Nam Nam	Cheveu; Jil Is Lucky; Zone Libre^{[B]}; Yann Tiersen; School of Seven Bells
Sunday 30 August	Baaba Maal; Macy Gray; Eagles of Death Metal; MGMT; The Prodigy	Metric; Robin McKelle; Sliimy; Le Petit Pois; Klaxons	Lilly Wood and the Prick; Hindi Zahra; Sammy Decoster; Veto; Patrick Wolf

^{A} Madness, who played earlier, replaced headliners Oasis, after a fight between the Gallagher brothers backstage which lead to the band's disbandment.
^{B} Replaced Esser

=== Edition 2010 ===
	Grande Scene	Scene de la Cascade	Scene de l'Industrie
Friday 27 August	All Time Low; Kele; Skunk Anansie; Cypress Hill; Blink-182	Minus The Bear; Band Of Horses; Foals; -The Kooks: Black Rebel Motorcycle Club; Underworld	Roken is Dodelijk; Kings of Conspiracy; Beast; French Cowboys; Deadmau5
Saturday 28 August	K'naan; Stereophonics; Paolo Nutini; Queens of the Stone Age; Massive Attack	Chew Lips; Plan B; Two Door Cinema Club; Jonsi; LCD Soundsystem; 2 Many DJ's	Viva and the Diva; Quadricolor; Martina Topley Bird; Naive New Beaters; Jello Biafra
Sunday 29 August	The Temper Trap; Eels; Beirut; The Ting Tings; Arcade Fire	Wallis Bird; Black Angels; Wayne Beckford; Fat Freddy's Drop; Roxy Music	Succes; I Am Un Chien!!; Rox; Wave Machine; Crystal Castles

=== Edition 2011 ===
	Grande Scene	Scene de la Cascade	Scene de l'Industrie	Scene Pression Live
Friday 26 August	Smith Westerns; Odd Future; CSS; The Kills; Foo Fighters	Biffy Clyro; Herman Dune; Kid Cudi; General Elektriks; Paul Kalkbrenner	Beat Mark; The Feeling Of Love; Funeral Party; Big Audio Dynamite; Yuksek	Edward Sharpe and the Magnetic Zeroes; Seasick Steve; Wolfgang^{[A]}; Grouplove; Jamaica; Death in Vegas
Saturday 27 August	HushPuppies; Blonde Redhead; The Streets^{[B]}; Interpol; Arctic Monkeys	The Black Box Revelation; -Cage the Elephant: BB Brunes; Cocorosie; Death From Above 1979; Etienne de Crecy	Myra Lee; Birdy Hunt; Austra; Keren Ann; Sexy Sushi	Pollock; Gruff Rhys; Le Corps Mince De François; The Jim Jones Revue; Wu Lyf; -The Wombats
Sunday 28 August	The Vaccines; Simple Plan; My Chemical Romance; Deftones; Archive	Crocodiles; Lilly Wood & The Prick; The La's; Anna Calvi; Nneka	Frànçois & the Atlas Mountains; Concrete Knives; Miles Kane; Tinie Tempah; Lykke Li	The Naked and Famous; Cat's Eyes; Cherri Bomb; The Horrors; Trentemoller

^{A} Replaced Young the Giant
^{B} Replaced Q Tip

=== Edition 2012 ===
	Grande Scene	Scene de la Cascade	Scene de l'Industrie	Scene Pression Live
Friday 24 August	Billy Talent; Asteroids Galaxy Tour; Dionysos; Bloc Party; Placebo	Citizens!; Get Well Soon and l'Ondif; The Shins; Sigur Ros; C2C	Owlle; Yeti Lane; The Knux; Para One; Miike Snow	Crane Angels; Grimes; Beth Jeans Houghton; Dark Dark Dark; Gesaffelstein, Brodinski & Club Cheval
Saturday 25 August	Of Monsters and Men; Maxïmo Park; Deus; Noel Gallagher's High Flying Birds; The Black Keys	Speech Debelle; Alberta Cross; Caravan Palace; The Temper Trap; EODM; Agoria	Granville; Hyphen Hyphen; Deap Vally; The Bewitched Hands; The Black Seeds	Ume; Toys; The Bots; Bass Drum of Death; Mark Lanegan Band
Sunday 26 August	Bombay Bicycle Club; Stuck in the Sound; The Dandy Warhols; Social Distortion; Green Day	BRNS; Family of the Year; The Waterboys; Grandaddy; Foster the People	Versus; The Lanskies; Little Boy; Little Dragon; DOPE D.O.D	Friends; Kimbra; Passion Pit; Avant Seine All-Stars; Beach House

=== Edition 2013 ===
	Grande Scene	Scene de la Cascade	Scene de l'Industrie	Scene Pression Live
Friday 23 August	Chance the Rapper; Belle and Sebastian; Tame Impala; Franz Ferdinand; Paul Kalkbrenner	Savages; Tomahawk; Alt-J; Kendrick Lamar	Big Black Delta; Team Ghost; Johnny Marr; The Pastels; Hanni El Khatib	Skaters; Daughter; DIIV; Alex Hepburn; !!!
Saturday 24 August	Eugene McGuinness; Black Rebel Motorcycle Club; Nine Inch Nails; Phoenix	Hola a Todo el Mundo; La Femme; Patrice; Vitalic VTLZR	Fi/She/Is; J.C Satan; Kid Noize; Jackson and His Computerband; Fritz Kalbrenner	In The Valley Below; Laura Mvula; Wavves; Valerie June; Fauve
Sunday 25 August	Temples; The Computers; Eels; The Bloody Beetroots; System of a Down	Surfer Blood; Mac Miller; Skip the Use; Major Lazer	St.Lô; Wall of Death; Is Tropical; Lianne La Havas; V.V. Brown	Polica; Ms Mr; Parquet Courts; Chvrches; Tricky

=== Edition 2014 ===
	Grande Scene	Scene de la Cascade	Scene de l'Industrie	Scene Pression Live	Scene de L'île de France
Friday 22 August	Cage the Elephant; Gary Clark Jr.; Jake Bugg; The Hives; Arctic Monkeys	Kitty, Daisy & Lewis; Wild Beasts; Blondie; Die Antwoord	Jessica93; Pegase; Crystal Fighters; Mac Demarco; Trentmoller	Tiger Bell; TRAAMS; Hozier; Royal Blood; Etienne de Crecy	Camp Claude; Velvet Veins; Alice Lewis
Saturday 23 August	St. Paul and The Broken Bones; The Ghost of a Saber Tooth Tiger; Portishead; The Prodigy	Junip; Thee Oh Sees; Emilie Simon; Flume	Dorian Pimpernel; ALB; Cheveu; Joey Bada$$; The Horrors	Giana Factory; Clean Bandit; Lucius; Frànçois & the Atlas Mountains; St.Vincent	Jean Jean; Agua Roja; Encore!
Sunday 24 August	Blood Red Shoes; Airbourne; Selah Sue; Lana Del Rey; Queens of the Stone Age	Cloud Nothings; Warpaint; Janelle Monáe; La Roux	Feu! Chatterton; Petit Fantôme; Brody Dalle; Tinariwen; Kavinsky	To Kill A King; Fat White Family; Thurston Moore; Stephen Malkmus; Cut Copy	Jeanne Added; Forever Pavot; T.I.T.S

=== Edition 2015 ===
	Grande Scene	Scene de la Cascade	Scene de l'Industrie	Scene Pression Live	Scene de L'île de France
Friday 28 August	Ghost; John Butler Trio; Rodrigo y Gabriela; The Offspring; Kasabian	Thrones + The Shines; Benjamin Clementine; FFS; Fauve	VKNG; Jeanne Added; Jacco Gardener; Miossec; Handbraekes (Boys Noize & Mr Oizo)	Kae Tempest; Wolf Alice; Catfish and the Bottlemen; Wand; Son Lux	Lewis Evans; Inigo Montoya; Clea Vincent
Saturday 29 August	The Maccabees; Ben Howard; Stereophonics; Interpol; The Libertines	Balthazar; Marina & The Diamonds; Gramatik; Étienne Daho	Forever Pavot; DBFC; Young Thug; Bianca Casady & The C.i.A.; Jamie xx	Cardiknox; Mini Mansions; Glass Animals; Years & Years; Shamir	Sparky In The Cloud; Lomepal; La Mverte
Sunday 30 August	Kadavar; My Morning Jacket; Hot Chip; Tame Impala; The Chemical Brothers	Juan Wauters; Fuzz; Jungle; Alt-J	We Are Match; Last Train; Seinabo Sey; Mark Lanegan Band; Run The Jewels	Pond; Natalie Prass; Here We Go Magic; Parquet Courts; N'To	Maestro; Marietta; Billie Brelok

=== Edition 2016 ===
	Grande Scene	Scene de la Cascade	Scene de l'Industrie	Scene Pression Live	Scene de L'île de France
Friday 26 August	Bombino; Caravan Palace; Bastille; Two Door Cinema Club; The Last Shadow Puppets	Logic; Anderson .Paak; Damian Jr. Gong Marley; Birdy Nam Nam	Theo Lawrence & The Hearts; Adrien Soleiman; Brian Jonestown Massacre; Clutch; Breakbot	The Strumbellas; Slaves; Jack Garratt; Royal Republic; Flavien Berger	Einleit; Djeuhdjoah & Lieutenant Nicholson; Rendez-Vous
Saturday 27 August	Beach Slang; Wolfmother; Bring Me the Horizon; Edward Sharpe & The Magnetic Zeros; Massive Attack	The Underachievers; Casseurs Flowters; La Femme; Sigur Rós	Kaviar Special; O; Grand Blanc; L7; Naive New Beaters	Joy Cut; Beau; Papooz; The Temper Trap; Half Moon Run	Tim Dup; Nusky & Vaati; The Psychotic Monks
Sunday 28 August	Blues Pills; Editors; Sum 41; Iggy Pop; Foals	Kevin Morby; Gregory Porter; Ghinzu; Cassius	Maestro; KillASon; Miike Snow; Chvrches; Soulwax	Imarhan; Bibi Bourelly; Little Simz; Aurora; Peaches	Tiwayo; Pogo Car Crash Control; JP Manova

=== Edition 2017 ===
	Grande Scene	Scene de la Cascade	Scene de l'Industrie	Scene Pression Live	Scene de L'île de France	Scene Firestone
Friday 25 August	Frank Carter & The Rattlesnakes; The Pretty Reckless; At The Drive In; Franz Ferdinand; Flume	Cabbage; The Pharcyde Live Band; The Jesus & Mary Chain; MØ	Inüit; Barbaglio; FKJ; 99Plajo; Hercules & Love Affaire; The Shins	Caballero & Jeanjass; Beach Fossils; Grouplove; Allah-Las; Black Lips	Gunwood; No Money Kids; Josman	Témé Tan; Cannibale; MNNQNS
Saturday 26 August	Ibibio Sound Machine; Band Of Horses; Jain; The Kills; PJ Harvey	DBFC; Girls In Hawaii; Little Dragon; Lee Fields & The Expressions; Fakear	Therapie Taxi; Lysistrata; Timber Timbre; Vince Staples; Frustration	Ulrika Spacek; Peter Peter; Her; Columbine; Sleaford Mods	Lastyjack; Dragon's Daughters; The Lizard's Epitaph; Bryan's Magic Tears; Karoline Rose	Elements 4; The Jacques; Fuzzy Vox
Sunday 27 August	King Khan & The Shrines; Deluxe; Mac Demarco; Cypress Hill; The XX	Car Seat Headrest; Ty Segall; George Ezra; Rone	Gracy Hopkins; Rendez-Vous; Denzel Curry; The Lemon Twigs; Formule / The Shoes	Amber Run; Romeo Elvis x Le Motel; Rejjie Snow; Slowdive; Panda Dub	Djmawi Africa; Clara Luciani; Villejuif Underground	Brodka; Douchka; Arnaud Rebotini

=== Edition 2018 ===
	Grande Scene	Scene de la Cascade	Scene de l'Industrie	Scene du Bosquet	Scene de L'île de France	Scene Firestone
Friday 24 August	Attaque 77; First Aid Kit; Mike Shinoda; Die Antwoord; PNL	Josman; Dirty Projectors; Nick Murphy; Parcels	Terrenoire; MNNQNS; Stefflon Don; The Limiñanas; Carpenter Brut	Noname; Yellow Days; George FitzGerald Live; SOPHIE; Yelle	DJAM; Fang the Great; Gothkine	West Thebarton; The Orielles; Deaf Havana
Saturday 25 August	Theo Lawrence & The Hearts; Cigarettes After Sex; King Gizzard & the Lizard Wizard; Liam Gallagher; Thirty Seconds to Mars	Sg Lewis; Anna Calvi; Black Star; Charlotte Gainsbourg	The Psychotic Monks; Malik Djoudi; Octavian; PLK; Casual Gabberz	Onyx Collective; Tamino; Insecure Men; Fat White Family; Yota Youth of the Apocalypse	8 in Bloom; La Veine; LILY; Moussa; Quai Stephane	Waste; Welshly Arms; Royaume
Sunday 26 August	Ady Suleiman; Confidence Man; Wolf Alice; Macklemore; Justice	The Regrettes; Mashrou' Leila; IDLES; Post Malone	Lord Esperanza; Halo Maud; Otzeki; Jessica93; Bonobo	Haute; Ezra Furman; Bicep; The Black Angels	Yanse; The Cage; Moons; Sein; Form	Johan Papaconstantino; Belako; Mourn

=== Edition 2019 ===
	Grande Scene	Scene de la Cascade	Scene des 4 vents	Scene Firestone	Scene de L'île de France
Friday 23 August	Balthazar; Jeanne Added; The Cure	Alice Merton; MNNQNS; Eels; Kompromat	Love Supreme; Silly Boy Blue; We Hate You Please Die; Johnny Marr; Bagarre	Lee-Ann Curren; Let's Eat Grandma; SÜEÜR	Reverse; Nouk's; Biche; Metro Mirage
Saturday 24 August	Catastrophe; Louis Cole Big Band; Alpha Wann; Jorja Smith; Major Lazer	Celeste; Girl in Red; Polo & Pan; Jungle	Zed Yun Pavarotti; 7 Jaws; Tommy Genesis; Mahalia; Mungo's Hi Fi featuring Charlie P. & Marina P.	Kitchies; Mathilda Homer; Peter Cat Recording Co.	Cheshire; Ruby in the Rough; Nomolas x Mo le J; Fils Cara; 404Billy
Sunday 25 August	Cannibale; Two Door Cinema Club; Bring Me the Horizon; Royal Blood; Aphex Twin	Mini Mansions; Sam Fender; Deerhunter; Foals	La Chica; Le Villejuif Underground; Clairo; Weval; Agar Agar	Decibelles; The Murder Capital; Boy Azooga	Foxxes; Half-Pipe; Mauvais Oeil; Calling Marian

=== Edition 2022 ===
Day	Grande Scene	Scene Cascade	Scene du Bosquet	Scene Firestone	Scene de L'île de France
Thursday, 25 August	Arctic Monkeys; Idles; Yungblud; Gayle	Fontaines D.C.; Inhaler; Yard Act	Priya Ragu; Beabadoobee; Requin Chagrin	Dehd; Baby Queen; NewDad	UTO; Ravage Club
Friday, 26 August	Nick Cave and the Bad Seeds; London Grammar; The Limiñanas; Aldous Harding	Kraftwerk; James Blake; DIIV; Jehnny Beth	Trentemøller; Squid; Los Bitchos; Zaho de Sagazan; Gwendoline	Animal Triste; Klangstof; Lucy Blue; Donna Blue	Anna Majidson; HSRS; The Initiativ; She'slate
Saturday, 27 August	Tame Impala; Jamie xx; La Femme; Malik Djoudi; Lucy Dacus	The Blaze; Izïa; Lewis OfMan; Robert Glasper; Perfume Genius	Lala &ce; Crystal Murray; November Ultra; Bryan's Magic Tears; Kids Return	Hey Djan; Lulu Van Trapp; Mr. Giscard; Oracle Sisters	Walter Astral; YSE; Going Forward; Lena Maegden
Sunday, 28 August	Stromae; Parcels; Aurora; Nu Genea Live Band; Holly Humberstone	FKJ; Fred again..; Vendredi sur Mer; Griff; Imarhan	Channel Tres; Joy Crookes; Skullcrusher; Michelle Blades; Ottis Cœur	Blu Samu; Shaga; Olivia Dean; Renard Tortue	Quasi Qui; Yoa; Mitty; Crys

=== Edition 2023 ===
Day	Grande Scene	Scene Cascade	Scene du Bosquet	Scene Firestone	Scene de L'île de France
Wednesday, 23 August	Billie Eilish; Girl in Red; Tove Lo; Lucie Antunes	—N/a		Nieve Ella; Hannah Grae; Mae Stephens	—N/a
Friday, 25 August	Placebo; Christine and the Queens; Boygenius; Bertrand Belin; Upsahl	Fever Ray; Flavien Berger; Viagra Boys; Turnstile	Romy; Avalon Emerson & The Charm; Silly Boy Blue; En Attendant Ana; The Big Idea	Dalle Béton; Pogo Car Crash Control; Glauque; Premier Métro	Bracco; Théa; Shmiska; Feather Aid
Saturday, 26 August	The Chemical Brothers; Cypress Hill; L'Impératrice; Altın Gün; Chromeo	Charlotte de Witte; Yeah Yeah Yeahs; Tamino; Noga Erez; Ethel Cain	Overmono; Brutus; Dry Cleaning; Social Dance; Uzi Freyja	Ada Oda; Coach Party; The Amazons; Rose Rose; Parlor Snakes	Ditter; NKA; Human Eyes; Venythia
Sunday, 27 August	The Strokes; Foals; Amyl and the Sniffers; Snail Mail; Nova Twins	Bonobo; Wet Leg; The Murder Capital; Gaz Coombes; Angel Olsen	Young Fathers; Zed Yun Pavarotti; Blumi; Jan Verstraeten	Be Your Own Pet; The Reytons; Julie; Gigi Perez	Spoink; Marguerite Thiam; Tessa Galli; SG Corp
