= Main Square Festival =

Annual music festival in Arras, France

Coordinates: 50.2825°N 2.7592°E

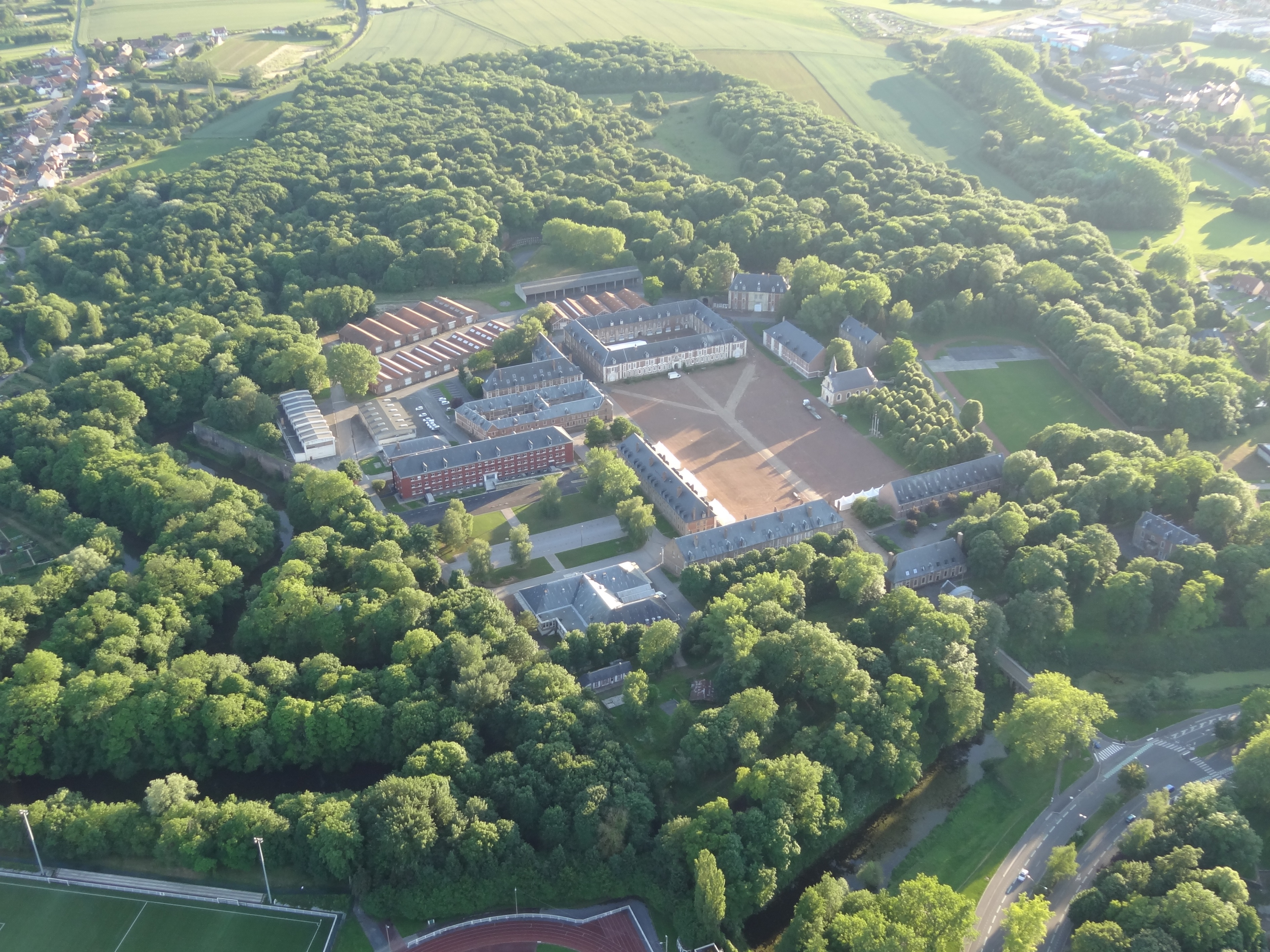
- Aerial view of the festival site (c.2012)
- Genre: Rock, indie rock, alternative rock, electronic, pop
- Dates: 1st weekend in July
- Locations: Arras, France: Grand-Place d'Arras (2004-09); Citadelle d'Arras (2010-present)
- Years active: 2004–present
- Founders: France Leduc Productions
- Organiser: Live Nation
- Website: Festival Website

The Main Square Festival is an annual international music festival organized by Live Nation which takes place in the first week-end of July in Arras, France.

Created in 2004 by France Leduc Productions, the festival rose to one of the major music events of the country, attracting worldwide famous bands and stars like Coldplay, Depeche Mode, Placebo, Muse, Indochine, and Pearl Jam.

== 2004 ==
The first edition of the Main Square Festival took place on 3 July 2004 on the Grand-Place d'Arras. Gomm performed during the opening act and the headliner was Placebo. 15,000 spectators were present.

== 2005 ==
In 2005, Kyo & Sum 41 were the headliners on 3 July. This edition gathered 9,000 spectators.

== 2006 ==
The 2006 edition gathered around 45,000 people for a two-day festival on the Grand-Place d'Arras. Depeche Mode, Goldfrapp, Muse, The Kooks & Second Sex were present. During their live show, Muse broadcast live Thierry Henry's goal for France against Brazil in the 2006 World Cup quarter-finals.

== 2007 ==
The 2007 edition took place on 30 June and 1 July. The line-up was mainly composed of French artists, including headliners Indochine and Tryo, but also Ayọ, The Sunshiners, Air & Peter von Poehl.

== 2008 ==
The 2008 edition marked the beginning of the partnership with Live Nation and a three-day-format. The festival was organized from 4 to 6 July. The line-up was denser and more prestigious than the previous years. The 2008 edition gathered more than 60,000 people on the Grand-Place d'Arras. The Chemical Brothers, Underworld and Justice headlined the first day of the festival alongside Boys Noize and 2 Many DJ's. On the second day, Mika, The Kooks and BB Brunes were the headliners and The Hoosiers, Digitalism and Panic! at the Disco also performed. The final day was headlined by Radiohead while Sigur Rós, The Dø, Vampire Weekend, and The Wombats also performed.

On 7 July, a concert of Quebec star Celine Dion was organized on the Grand-Place d'Arras by Live Nation. Arras, Paris and Nice were the only three French cities on her "Taking Chances World Tour".

On 14 August, Live Nation organized another concert on the Grand-Place d'Arras. The entertainment company brought American heavy metal band Metallica for a show that lasted over two hours.

== 2009 ==
In 2009, the festival took place from 2 to 5 July. The four-day-festival was headlined by Coldplay, Kanye West, Placebo and Lenny Kravitz. Despite the prestigious line-up, the tickets were tough to sell. The 4-day pass cost 175€. A few days before the festival, the organizers decided to apply a 40% discount on the tickets.

Other performers included The Ting Tings, Amy Macdonald, M. Ward, Lily Allen, Phoenix, Birdy Nam Nam, Yuksek, Boys Noize, Kaiser Chiefs, Bloc Party, Gossip, Ghinzu, Expatriate, Crookers, Moby, Franz Ferdinand, Duffy, Katy Perry, Justin Nozuka & Michael Franti.

== 2010 ==
The 2010 edition is the first that was held at the Citadelle d'Arras, a UNESCO listed site. The capacity of the new venue is doubled and a new stage is added.

=== Main Square Festival ===
110,000 tickets were sold for the 2010 edition. The headline acts were The Black Eyed Peas, Pearl Jam, Rammstein, and Pink. Many other artists performed, including David Guetta, Jamiroquai, Pony Pony Run Run, La Roux, Vitalic, The Bloody Beetroots, Curry & Coco, Something A La mode, Ben Harper, M, Phoenix, Coheed and Cambria, Julian Casablancas, Gomez, Taylor Hawkins and the Coattail Riders, TV Glory, Gush, Angus & Julia Stone, Hawkins, Art Point M, Gossip, Stereophonics, Florence and the Machine, Yeasayer, Skip The Use, The Bewitched hands, Patrick Watson & Delphic.

=== Main Square Special ===
On 9 July 2010, Live Nation produced a show which featured Prince, Larry Graham et Mint Condition. 22 000 tickets were sold for the show.

== 2011 ==
The second edition at the Citadelle d'Arras is known as one of the best pop rock lineup of the festival. The three-day festival gathered around 100 000 spectators during the three days.

Headline acts performed on the Main Stage and included The Chemical Brothers, Linkin Park, Queens Of The Stone Age, Limp Bizkit, Shaka Ponk, The Gaslight Anthem, The Pretty Reckless, Moby, Arcade Fire, The National, Kaiser Chiefs, White Lies, Yodelice, Triggerfinger, Coldplay, Portishead, PJ Harvey, Elbow, Bruno Mars, Charles Bradley, Rival Sons.

Other artists performed on a smaller stage called Greenroom: Martin Solveig, Beady Eye, Eels, Selah Sue, Tame Impala, Jenny & Johnny, Warpaint, Welling Walrus, The Shoes, Kasabian, Two Door Cinema Club, Jimmy Eat World, Fleet Foxes, Aloe Blacc, Everything Everything, Mai, Underworld, Magnetic Man, Cold War Kids, Julian Perretta, Puggy, I Blame Coco, Evaline, Manceau.

== 2012 ==
The 2012 edition took place from 29 June to 1 July 2012. This edition gathered 25% less spectators than the previous one (75,000). The line-up was criticized for being too "pop".

	Friday 29 June	Saturday 30 June	Sunday 1 July
Main Stage	(United Kingdom) The Maccabees (United Kingdom) The Subways (United Kingdom) Simple Minds (United Kingdom) Garbage (United Kingdom) Kasabian (United Kingdom) The xx (France) Justice	(United States) X (France) Skip the Use (Netherlands) Within Temptation (United Kingdom) The Kooks (United Kingdom) Florence + The Machine (United States) Pearl Jam (France) Birdy Nam Nam	(United States) The All-American Rejects (United Kingdom) Gaz Coombes (United States) Wiz Khalifa (United States) Incubus (France) Shaka Ponk (United States) Blink-182 (France) Etienne de Crécy
Greenroom	(France) Lolito (France) Greenshape (France) Stuck In The Sound (United States) Electric Geust (France) Brigitte (United Kingdom) Editors (United Kingdom) Metronomy (United Kingdom) Chase & Status	(France) La Moustache de Martin PinPin (United States) Kreayshawn (United Kingdom) Velvet Revolver, (United Kingdom) Miles Kane (Japan) Miyavi (France) Izia (United States) The Rapture (United Kingdom) The Zombie Kids	(France) Girl's Toys (United Kingdom) Michael Kiwanuka (United States) Beat Assailant (United Kingdom) Noah and the Whale (United Kingdom) Ben Howard (United States) The Mars Volta (France) M83 (Israel) The Young Professionals

== 2013 ==
In 2013, the Main Square Festival took place from 5 to 7 July. The line-up included Green Day, The Hives, Biffy Clyro, The Prodigy, Bloc Party, Sting, Indochine, Thirty Seconds To Mars, Modestep, Netsky, Mike + The Mechanics, Alt-J, Damien Saez, Of Monsters and Men, Madeon, Stereophonics, Lou Doillon, Modest Mouse.

== 2014 ==
The Main Square Festival celebrated its 10th anniversary in 2014. For this occasion, the festival announced an attractive line-up on four days. The first day was dedicated to heavy metal with Iron Maiden as headline act alongside Alice in Chains, Mastodon, and Ghost. Other days included performances from The Black Keys, Franz Ferdinand, Imagine Dragons, Stromae, Paul Kalkbrenner, David Guetta, James Arthur and many more.

The 2014 edition gathered a record-number of 135,000 spectators.

July 3

- Iron Maiden
- Alice in Chains
- Mastodon
- Ghost

July 4

- The Black Keys
- Franz Ferdinand
- Skrillex
- Imagine Dragons
- Woodkid
- Gesaffelstein
- Triggerfinger

July 5

- Stromae
- Paul Kalkbrenner
- Jack Johnson
- MGMT
- Foals
- Disclosure
- John Butler Trio
- Yodelice
- Arsenal

July 6

- David Guetta
- -M-
- Detroit
- Rodrigo y Gabriela
- London Grammar
- Girls in Hawaii
- Bakermat
- James Arthur

== 2015 ==
For the 2015 edition, the festival went back to its three-day format. Headline acts included Muse, Lenny Kravitz and Pharrell Williams.

July 3

- Lenny Kravitz
- Shaka Ponk
- The Script
- Hozier
- George Ezra
- Rone
- Lindsey Stirling
- Kodaline
- Patrice
- Sheppard

July 4

- Muse
- Skip the Use
- Royal Blood
- Madeon
- Fakear (Live)
- James Bay
- BØRNS
- Circa Waves

July 5

- Pharrell Williams
- Sam Smith
- Mumford & Sons
- Lilly Wood and the Prick
- IAM
- The Avener
- Tiken Jah Fakoly
- Oscar & The Wolf
- Rudimental (Live)
- ILoveMakonnen

== 2016 ==
The 2016 edition took place from 1 to 3 July. The festival was headlined by Iggy Pop, Disclosure, Macklemore & Ryan Lewis, and Les Insus.

	1 July	2 July	3 July
Main Stage	Disclosure; Iggy Pop; Louise Attaque; Ellie Goulding; Jake Bugg	Birdy Nam Nam; Macklemore & Ryan Lewis; The Offspring; Walk off the Earth; Mass Hysteria; Lonely the Brave	Les Insus; Editors; Ghinzu; Band of Horses; Last Train; The Struts
Greenroom	Boys Noize; Flume; Jeanne Added; Yelawolf; The London Souls; Cayman Kings	Salut C'est Cool; Nekfeu; X Ambassadors; Marina Kaye; Nathaniel Rateliff & The Night Sweats; Bear's Den; Cardri	Odesza; Years & Years; L.E.J; A-Vox; Tiggs Da Author; Evrest

== 2017 ==
The 2017 edition gathered 36 artists for a three-day festival. Radiohead was the main act and performed during a 2h30 show on the last day.

30 June

- System of a Down
- Above & Beyond
- Biffy Clyro
- Soulwax
- Vitalic ODC (Live)
- Machine Gun Kelly
- Frank Carter & The Rattlesnakes
- Don Broco
- The Inspector Cluzo
- The Noface

1 July

- Major Lazer
- Die Antwoord
- Kungs
- Jain
- Kaleo
- Dirtyphonics
- Xavier Rudd
- Rag'n'Bone Man
- Vald
- Cage the Elephant
- Talisco
- Walking on Cars

2 July

- Radiohead
- Savages
- Seasick Steve
- La Femme
- Mark Lanegan Band
- Highly Suspect
- Thylacine
- The Lemon Twigs
- Naive New Beaters
- Spoon
- Kensington

== 2018 ==
36 artists were present for the 2018 edition. Headline acts were Queens of the Stone Age, Depeche Mode and Orelsan.

6 July

- Queens of the Stone Age
- Nekfeu
- Gojira
- Paul Kalkbrenner
- The Breeders

7 July

- Depeche Mode
- Liam Gallagher
- Oscar & The Wolf
- Feder
- The Blaze
- BB Brunes
- Wolf Alice

8 July

- Jamiroquai
- Orelsan
- IAM
- Portugal. The Man
- Girls in Hawaii
- Loïc Nottet

== 2019 ==
The 2019 edition took place in La Citadelle d'Arras from 5 July to 7 July 2019. It was the 15th edition. On 5 July, the line-up included various artists including DJ Snake, Christine & the Queens, Damso, Cypress Hill, Angèle, Lizzo, Miles Kane. On 6 July, Martin Garrix, Skip The Use, Masego among others performed. On 7 July, the line-up included John Butler Trio, Bigflo & Oli, Editors, Jain, Ben Harper and others.

== 2020 & 2021 ==
2020 and 2021 editions were cancelled due to COVID-19 pandemic.

== 2022 ==
The 2022 edition took place from 30 June to 3 July 2022, with four days of festival. The headline acts were DJ Snake, Sting, Black Eyed Peas, and Twenty One Pilots. The Pixies were originally scheduled to play on 2 July but they cancelled due to a Covid-19 infection in the group. They were replaced by French band Inspecteur Cluzo.

== 2023 ==
The 2023 edition took place from 30 June to July 2 2023, going back to a three-day-format. The organisation increased the prices of the tickets, three-day passes went from 129€ in 2022 to 155€ in 2023. The line-up included artists such as Aya Nakamura, David Guetta, Macklemore, Maroon 5, John Butler, Kungs, Tiakola.

== 2024 ==
In 2024, the Main Square Festival will celebrate its 20th anniversary. However, the 2024 edition will not be the 20th as two editions were cancelled in 2020 and 2021.
