= List of Ultratop 50 number-one singles of 2018 =

These hits topped the Ultratop 50 in 2018.

Flanders
Issue date	Song	Artist
6 January	"Perfect" (including "Perfect Duet" and "Perfect Symphony")	Ed Sheeran (with Beyoncé / with Andrea Bocelli)
13 January	"Perfect" (including "Perfect Duet" and "Perfect Symphony")	Ed Sheeran (with Beyoncé / with Andrea Bocelli)
20 January	"Perfect" (including "Perfect Duet" and "Perfect Symphony")	Ed Sheeran (with Beyoncé / with Andrea Bocelli)
27 January	"Perfect" (including "Perfect Duet" and "Perfect Symphony")	Ed Sheeran (with Beyoncé / with Andrea Bocelli)
3 February	"Perfect" (including "Perfect Duet" and "Perfect Symphony")	Ed Sheeran (with Beyoncé / with Andrea Bocelli)
10 February	"Crazy"	Lost Frequencies and Zonderling
17 February	"Crazy"	Lost Frequencies and Zonderling
24 February	"Crazy"	Lost Frequencies and Zonderling
3 March	"Crazy"	Lost Frequencies and Zonderling
10 March	"Crazy"	Lost Frequencies and Zonderling
17 March	"Zoutelande"	BLØF featuring Geike Arnaert
24 March	"Zoutelande"	BLØF featuring Geike Arnaert
31 March	"Zoutelande"	BLØF featuring Geike Arnaert
7 April	"Zoutelande"	BLØF featuring Geike Arnaert
14 April	"Zoutelande"	BLØF featuring Geike Arnaert
21 April	"Zoutelande"	BLØF featuring Geike Arnaert
28 April	"One Kiss"	Calvin Harris and Dua Lipa
5 May	"One Kiss"	Calvin Harris and Dua Lipa
12 May	"One Kiss"	Calvin Harris and Dua Lipa
19 May	"One Kiss"	Calvin Harris and Dua Lipa
26 May	"One Kiss"	Calvin Harris and Dua Lipa
2 June	"One Kiss"	Calvin Harris and Dua Lipa
9 June	"One Kiss"	Calvin Harris and Dua Lipa
16 June	"One Kiss"	Calvin Harris and Dua Lipa
23 June	"One Kiss"	Calvin Harris and Dua Lipa
30 June	"One Kiss"	Calvin Harris and Dua Lipa
7 July	"One Kiss"	Calvin Harris and Dua Lipa
14 July	"One Kiss"	Calvin Harris and Dua Lipa
21 July	"One Kiss"	Calvin Harris and Dua Lipa
28 July	"Ellie"	Regi featuring Jake Reese
4 August	"Ellie"	Regi featuring Jake Reese
11 August	"Ellie"	Regi featuring Jake Reese
18 August	"Ellie"	Regi featuring Jake Reese
25 August	"Ellie"	Regi featuring Jake Reese
1 September	"Ellie"	Regi featuring Jake Reese
8 September	"Ellie"	Regi featuring Jake Reese
15 September	"Shotgun"	George Ezra
22 September	"Shotgun"	George Ezra
29 September	"Shotgun"	George Ezra
6 October	"Shotgun"	George Ezra
13 October	"Shotgun"	George Ezra
20 October	"Shotgun"	George Ezra
27 October	"Shotgun"	George Ezra
3 November	"Be Alright"	Dean Lewis
10 November	"Shotgun"	George Ezra
17 November	"Promises"	Calvin Harris and Sam Smith
24 November	"Be Alright"	Dean Lewis
1 December	"Sweet but Psycho"	Ava Max
8 December	"Sweet but Psycho"	Ava Max
15 December	"Sweet but Psycho"	Ava Max
22 December	"Sweet but Psycho"	Ava Max
29 December	"Sweet but Psycho"	Ava Max

Wallonia
Issue date	Song	Artist
6 January	"Perfect" (including "Perfect Duet" and "Perfect Symphony")	Ed Sheeran (with Beyoncé / with Andrea Bocelli)
13 January	"Perfect" (including "Perfect Duet" and "Perfect Symphony")	Ed Sheeran (with Beyoncé / with Andrea Bocelli)
20 January	"Perfect" (including "Perfect Duet" and "Perfect Symphony")	Ed Sheeran (with Beyoncé / with Andrea Bocelli)
27 January	"Perfect" (including "Perfect Duet" and "Perfect Symphony")	Ed Sheeran (with Beyoncé / with Andrea Bocelli)
3 February	"Perfect" (including "Perfect Duet" and "Perfect Symphony")	Ed Sheeran (with Beyoncé / with Andrea Bocelli)
10 February	"Perfect" (including "Perfect Duet" and "Perfect Symphony")	Ed Sheeran (with Beyoncé / with Andrea Bocelli)
17 February	"Hit Sale"	Therapie Taxi featuring Roméo Elvis
24 February	"Hit Sale"	Therapie Taxi featuring Roméo Elvis
3 March	"Hit Sale"	Therapie Taxi featuring Roméo Elvis
10 March	"Crazy"	Lost Frequencies and Zonderling
17 March	"Hit Sale"	Therapie Taxi featuring Roméo Elvis
24 March	"Hit Sale"	Therapie Taxi featuring Roméo Elvis
31 March	"Crazy"	Lost Frequencies and Zonderling
7 April	"La même"	Maître Gims featuring Vianney
14 April	"La même"	Maître Gims featuring Vianney
21 April	"La même"	Maître Gims featuring Vianney
28 April	"La même"	Maître Gims featuring Vianney
5 May	"La même"	Maître Gims featuring Vianney
12 May	"La même"	Maître Gims featuring Vianney
19 May	"La même"	Maître Gims featuring Vianney
26 May	"La même"	Maître Gims featuring Vianney
2 June	"La même"	Maître Gims featuring Vianney
9 June	"La même"	Maître Gims featuring Vianney
16 June	"La même"	Maître Gims featuring Vianney
23 June	"Smog"	Damso
30 June	"One Kiss"	Calvin Harris and Dua Lipa
7 July	"One Kiss"	Calvin Harris and Dua Lipa
14 July	"One Kiss"	Calvin Harris and Dua Lipa
21 July	"One Kiss"	Calvin Harris and Dua Lipa
28 July	"One Kiss"	Calvin Harris and Dua Lipa
4 August	"One Kiss"	Calvin Harris and Dua Lipa
11 August	"One Kiss"	Calvin Harris and Dua Lipa
18 August	"One Kiss"	Calvin Harris and Dua Lipa
25 August	"One Kiss"	Calvin Harris and Dua Lipa
1 September	"Solo"	Clean Bandit featuring Demi Lovato
8 September	"Solo"	Clean Bandit featuring Demi Lovato
15 September	"Solo"	Clean Bandit featuring Demi Lovato
22 September	"Solo"	Clean Bandit featuring Demi Lovato
29 September	"In My Mind"	Dynoro and Gigi D'Agostino
6 October	"In My Mind"	Dynoro and Gigi D'Agostino
13 October	"In My Mind"	Dynoro and Gigi D'Agostino
20 October	"In My Mind"	Dynoro and Gigi D'Agostino
27 October	"In My Mind"	Dynoro and Gigi D'Agostino
3 November	"In My Mind"	Dynoro and Gigi D'Agostino
10 November	"In My Mind"	Dynoro and Gigi D'Agostino
17 November	"In My Mind"	Dynoro and Gigi D'Agostino
24 November	"Rêves bizarres"	Orelsan featuring Damso
1 December	"In My Mind"	Dynoro and Gigi D'Agostino
8 December	"In My Mind"	Dynoro and Gigi D'Agostino
15 December	"In My Mind"	Dynoro and Gigi D'Agostino
22 December	"Tout oublier"	Angèle featuring Roméo Elvis
29 December	"Tout oublier"	Angèle featuring Roméo Elvis

Flanders ranking of most weeks at number 1
Position	Artist	Weeks #1
1	Calvin Harris	14
2	Dua Lipa	13
3	George Ezra	8
4	Regi	7
4	Jake Reese	7
5	BLØF	6
5	Geike Arnaert	6
6	Ed Sheeran	5
6	Beyoncé	5
6	Andrea Bocelli	5
6	Lost Frequencies	5
6	Zonderling	5
6	Ava Max	5
7	Dean Lewis	2
8	Sam Smith	1

Wallonia ranking of most weeks at number 1
Position	Artist	Weeks #1
1	Maître Gims	11
1	Vianney	11
1	Dynoro	11
1	Gigi D'Agostino	11
2	Calvin Harris	9
2	Dua Lipa	9
3	Ed Sheeran	6
3	Beyoncé	6
3	Andrea Bocelli	6
3	Roméo Elvis	6
4	Therapie Taxi	5
5	Clean Bandit	4
5	Demi Lovato	4
6	Lost Frequencies	2
6	Zonderling	2
6	Damso	2
6	Angèle	2
7	Orelsan	1

== See also ==
- List of number-one albums of 2018 (Belgium)
- 2018 in music
