= Adé (singer) =

French musician and singer

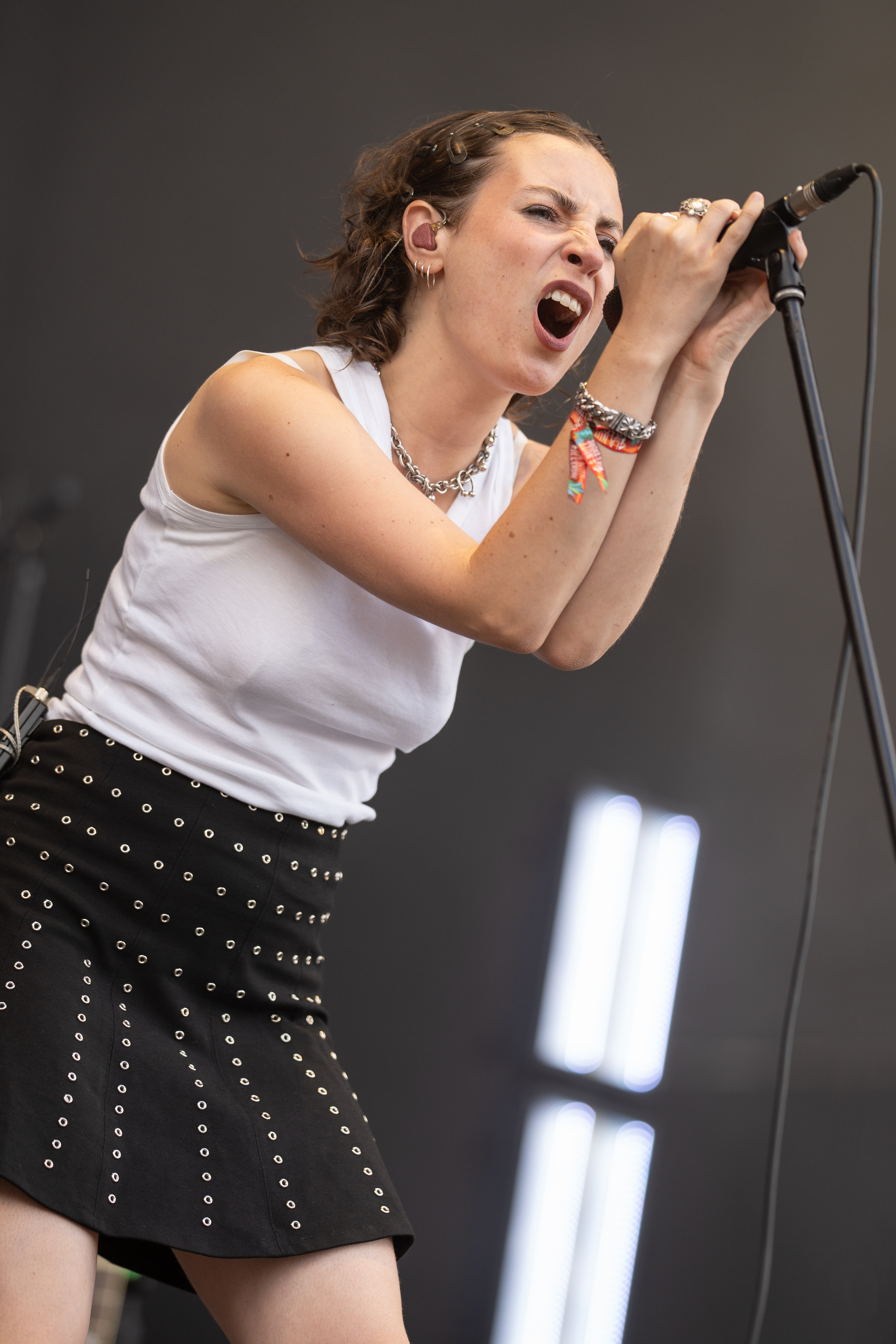
- Adé in concert, 2025

Background information
- Born: Adélaïde Chabannes de Balsac; April 23, 1995 (age 31); France
- Genres: Pop music, Country music
- Instruments: Vocals, guitar, harmonica
- Years active: 2013 – present
- Label: Tôt ou Tard
- Formerly of: Therapie Taxi
- Website: adeofficiel.com

Adélaïde Chabannes de Balsac, known professionally by her stage name Adé, is a French musician and singer of several genres, including folk-pop. Previously a member of the French band Therapie Taxi, in 2022 she began a solo career with her debut album, Et Alors?.

== Biography ==
Balsac was born on April 23, 1995.

In 2013, Adé formed the pop rock band Therapie Taxi along with Raphaël Faget-Zaoui, whom she had met performing a cover of "Jimmy" by Moriarty, when she was seventeen. In 2017, having expanded the band to four members with the addition of Félix Gros and Renaud Bizart, the band released its first single, Salope. From then until the band's breakup in 2021, Balsac worked on two albums, Hit Sale and Exquisite Corpse, releasing a final EP Shit Breakup in 2020. During this time, Balsac also participated in two tours – on in 2019, ending at Zénith Paris, and a second which was cancelled due to the COVID-19 pandemic in France. Adé cited a lack of creative freedom for her dissolving the band, wanting a "clean slate".

After leaving Therapie Taxi, Adé created several songs in collaboration with other artists, in with Benjamin Biolay, for Parc fermé (2021), with Nolwenn Leroy for the album La Cavale (2021) as well as with Louane for the song Pleure (2020).

In April 2022, she released her first single: Tout savoir, followed by her 13-song début album So What? (French: Et alors?) on September 23, 2022, under the label Tôt ou Tard. The album was written during the COVID-19 pandemic, and contrary to the previous music she had produced in Therapie Taxi, is country folk and inspired by American country music – Adé travelled to Nashville, Tennessee to record parts of the album, wanting to experience an "American fantasy", taking a road trip across the country after the album's completion. In January 2023, Balsac began a domestic tour for the album, performing in cities including Paris, Bordeaux, and Nantes, ending at the Printemps de Bourges. The album received positive feedback, with Balsac being named the "new cowgirl of French pop" by Le Soir.

Tout savoir achieved success, reaching number 5 on the French Singles Chart on October 2, 2022. The song had an accompanying music video, released on YouTube, which was directed by Stéphane Barbato and produced in collaboration with Warner Chappell Music France. As of May 2023, the video had received over seven million views.

In 2022, Adé was nominated for two categories in the NRJ Music Award – Francophone Breakthrough of the Year and Francophone Video of the Year (the latter being for the music video of Tout savoir).

== Discography ==
=== Studio albums ===
- 2022: Et alors ???
- 2024: INSIDE OUT MVMT

=== Singles ===
- "Tout savoir" released 19 April 2022 – peaked at No. 5
- "Sunset" released 24 August 2022
- "Q" released 23 September 2022
