= The Echo Show =

Studio album by Yeti Lane
- Released: 5 March 2012
- Recorded: Planète Sun Studios, Paris, France
- Genre: Psychedelic rock, shoegaze
- Label: Sonic Cathedral (UK); Clapping Music (Europe)
- Producer: Yeti Lane & Antoine Gaillet

Yeti Lane chronology
Yeti Lane (2009/2010)	The Echo Show (2012)	L'Aurore (2016)

Singles from The Echo Show
- 1. "Sparkling Sunbeam" Released: 12 March 2012

The Echo Show is the second studio album by French band Yeti Lane, released on 5 March 2012.

== Critical reception ==
Professional ratings
Review scores
Source	Rating
BBC Music	favourable
Drowned in Sound	8/10
MusicOMH	4.5/5 stars
NME	8/10
Q	4/5 stars
Uncut	4/5 stars

Reviews for the album were mostly positive. MusicOMH was enthusiastic, saying "Each part of the duo brings their particular expertise to the table, allowing them to collectively create something that is more often than not, rather magical... It's the duo’s capacity to work together and utilise their independent strengths for the good of the song that makes The Echo Show such a strong album. The balance between melody and chaos is in perfect equilibrium, creating a truly epic piece of work." Several reviewers noted the influence of Krautrock bands such as Kraftwerk and Neu!: Q described the record as "accentuating their irregular orbit between space Krautrock & 60s pop... The Echo Show sparkles with energy and verve", while Uncut said the album "offers Jean Michel Jarre meets Neu! '75 with everything turned up to 11. In the nicest possible way, it's monstrous". NME said "layers of bubbling synths build on top of krautrock-leaning rhythms and some otherworldly guitar sounds. The end result is stunning – like Grandaddy's The Sophtware Slump reimagined by Kraftwerk and Kevin Shields". Drowned in Sound noted the leap forward from the band's debut album, saying "there's an unerring tenacity about this record which suggests its real intention was to herald a new beginning. And more importantly, it succeeds on every level." BBC Music said "there's a seductively majestic quality always at play".

== Track listing ==
All tracks written and composed by Yeti Lane.

1. "Analog Wheel" – 7:56
2. "The Echo Show" – 4:10
3. "Warning Sensations" – 4:03
4. - – 0:27
5. "Logic Winds" – 4:01
6. "Strange Call" – 3:21
7. -- – 0:30
8. "Alba" – 5:03
9. --- – 1:37
10. "Dead Tired" – 4:32
11. "Sparkling Sunbeam" – 5:11
12. "Faded Spectrum" – 6:48
13. ---- – 1:04
- The four tracks represented by dashes are untitled and consist of mostly instrumental pieces of music.

== Personnel ==
- Ben Pleng – vocals, guitars, bass, keyboards, programming
- Charlie B – drums, keyboards, programming
- David-Ivar Herman Dune – vocals on "Sparkling Sunbeam"
- Jane Mosconi – backing vocals on "Alba"
- Barbara Silverstone – backing vocals on "Alba"
