= Shoegazing Kids =

Studio album by Stuck in the Sound
- Released: 26 January 2009
- Recorded: 2008
- Genre: Indie rock, shoegaze
- Length: 45:16
- Language: English
- Label: Discograph

Stuck in the Sound chronology
Nevermind the Living Dead (2006)	Shoegazing Kids (2009)	Pursuit (2012)

Singles from Shoegazing Kids
- 1. "Ouais" Released: 1 December 2008; 2. "Shoot Shoot" Released: 29 June 2009

Shoegazing Kids is the second studio album by French indie rock band Stuck in the Sound. Released on 26 January 2009 through Discograph Records, the album was available as both a physical release and download in their home country of France, but exclusively as a download in a number of other countries. The songs on the album were all recorded in the same studio and the record was mixed in New York City by producer Nick Sansano and mastered by Ted Jensen. The record contains a mixture of indie rock and shoegaze genres, and the track "Ouais" was in particular hailed for its Britpop style. The album featured the first instrumental track to be released by the band and has been described as more ambitious and experimental than Stuck in the Sound's previous effort, Nevermind the Living Dead.

In France, the album sold over 10,000 copies in its first three months and achieved a peak position of #69 on the French albums chart. Two singles have so far been released from the record; "Ouais" was released in December 2008 and "Shoot Shoot" was released in June 2009. The album was accompanied by a European tour and following its release the band made a number of festival appearances. Upon its release the album received mostly positive reviews and was described by one critic as "really exciting", although it was also criticised for relying too heavily on its influences, and was branded as unpleasant by one reviewer.

== Background and recording ==
Stuck in the Sound wrote the songs for Shoegazing Kids in their home country of France before travelling to New York in 2008 to work with American producer Nick Sansano. The band were effusive in their praise of Sansano, saying "we'd come up with an image or a colour for each track and Nick retranscribed our ideas perfectly, adding his own personal touch along the way". The band themselves felt that thanks to the fact they had worked together in one studio to produce the album, the tracks on Shoegazing Kids were more coherent than those on their previous record. Stuck in the Sound bassist Arno Bordas explained: "All the tracks were recorded in the same place, written more or less around the same period and mixed by the same person. So there's a real unity of time and place". The record was mastered by Grammy Award winner Ted Jensen.

== Musical style ==
The band's first commercially released album, Nevermind the Living Dead, was—according to the band—"about showing off what we could do". Conversely, Shoegazing Kids has been described as a more subtle, ambitious and experimental record. The album contains references to a number of musical genres, including indie rock, shoegazing and pop rock. The cover art features a girl staring at her shoes in front of a blue background, and this was designed to reflect the theme of the album. Arno Bordas described the record as having "a sort of blue-ish tone lingering... all the way through". Lead singer José Reis Fontao said that the band "staked everything on emotion on this album, on the way the songs are delivered". The opening track, "Zapruder", is an instrumental, the first released by the band. The indie rock style of Shoegazing Kids garnered comparisons to bands such as The Pixies, The Smiths and Nirvana, and Fontao's vocals on the album were likened to those of Muse frontman Matt Bellamy. Despite the band being from France, the songs on the album are entirely sung in English, to enable the meanings of the lyrics to be more abstract.

== Release ==
The album was released on the Paris-based Discograph label on 26 January 2009. In the band's home country of France, the album was released as a compact disc, an LP and as a digital download. The album was also released as a download around the world on iTunes and other download services. Shoegazing Kids was the group's first album to place on the French albums chart, reaching a peak position of #69 on the week of its release and staying in the chart for six weeks. The album was Stuck in the Sound's biggest-selling record to date, selling over 10,000 copies in France in the first three months after its release.

Two tracks have to date been released from the album as singles – "Ouais" was brought out on 1 December 2008, over a month before the release of the album itself, and "Shoot Shoot" was released on 29 June 2009. "Ouais" received some airplay, but both singles failed to chart. The release of the record was accompanied by a tour of Europe, which started on 23 January 2009 and included a number of dates in France and neighbouring Germany. The band also appeared at a number of music festivals during the summer of 2009, including Francofolies and Solidays.

== Critical reception ==
Professional ratings
Review scores
Source	Rating
Albumrock	2/5 stars
Fluctuat	5/5 stars
Le Choix	3/5 stars
Mediacult	3/4 stars
Soundmag	7/10 stars

Shoegazing Kids was generally well received by critics who praised the energy and ability of the band. In his review of the album, Iain WhiteTapes lauded Stuck in the Sound's "extreme technical skill", and called the album a "revelling journey through stories of failed relationships, fleeting romances and long nights in Paris bars". Another critic also praised the album, calling it "good pop that is for everyone, both terribly accessible and really exciting". Thomas Lhuillery of Rock'n'France applauded the record's "catchy choruses and intoxicating riffs", and hailed the track "Ouais" as "a perfect illustration of [the band's] frenzied Britpop". In her review, Rita Carvalho of Fluctuat praised the guitar work on "Dirty Waterfalls", comparing it to the style of The Cribs guitarist Johnny Marr. She also commented positively on the arpeggiation on "Teen Tale" and "Playback A.L.". The Soundmag reviewer complimented the "exploding energy" of the two singles, and called the album a "colourful bouquet of fine tunes". Marine Bienvenot described the song "I Love You Dark" as a "pop gem", and stated that the band had succeeded in their combination of melodic power pop and rock guitars, and that this was aided by Fontao's vocals.

However, the album also received negative criticism. The reviewer from Albumrock rated the album two out of five, accusing it of sounding too similar throughout, with the songs being described as "unpleasant". In the same review, the record was likened to "a piece of frozen mutton". Another critic wrote that while none of the tracks stood out as being particularly bad, the album relied too heavily on its influences, claiming that the band needed "a dose of decadence" to distinguish them from their predecessors.

== Track listing ==
All songs written and composed by Stuck in the Sound.

No.	Title	Length
1.	"Zapruder"	3:43
2.	"Ouais"	4:59
3.	"Utah"	3:22
4.	"Shoot Shoot"	3:44
5.	"Teen Tale"	5:25
6.	"Playback A.L."	4:18
7.	"Beautiful Losers"	3:00
8.	"What?!"	1:45
9.	"Dirty Waterfalls"	2:39
10.	"Erase"	3:48
11.	"Gore Machine"	3:32
12.	"I Love You Dark"	5:01

== Chart positions ==
Chart	Peak position
French album chart (SNEP)	69

== Personnel ==
Stuck in the Sound

- José Reis Fontao – lead vocals, electric guitar
- François Ernie – drums, backing vocals
- Emmanuel Barichasse – electric guitar, acoustic guitar, piano, keyboards
- Arno Bordas – bass guitar

Additional personnel

- Stuck in the Sound – production
- Romain Della Valle – recording
- Nick Sansano – mixing, production
- Ted Jensen – mastering
