= Nevermind the Living Dead =

Studio album by Stuck in the Sound
- Released: 6 November 2006
- Recorded: 2006
- Genre: Indie rock
- Length: 56:38
- Language: English
- Label: Discograph

Stuck in the Sound chronology
Stuck in the Sound (2004)	Nevermind the Living Dead (2006)	Shoegazing Kids (2009)

Nevermind the Living Dead is the first studio album from French indie rock band Stuck in the Sound. Released on 6 November 2006 on the Discograph label, the record was the first by the band to be commercially released. It followed their self-titled 2004 debut and included a number of songs from the previous record. It was released as a compact disc in France, and as a download in a number of other countries. The album was generally well received and has been praised in particular for its sharp melodies and punchy guitars. The record garnered comparisons to bands such as At the Drive-In and Pixies. By the band's own admission, Nevermind the Living Dead was about showing off what they could do.

== Track listing ==
All songs written and composed by Stuck in the Sound.

No.	Title	Length
1.	"I Shot My Friend"	4:55
2.	"Toy Boy"	4:25
3.	"Cramp, Push and Take It Easy!"	3:34
4.	"Delicious Dog"	5:09
5.	"Waste"	4:15
6.	"Don't Break the Bar Please Dumbo!"	2:29
7.	"Don't Go Henry"	5:13
8.	"Nevermind the Living Dead"	5:02
9.	"Never on the Radio"	2:51
10.	"I Travel the World"	4:17
11.	"It's (Friday)"	3:01
12.	"Third Eyed Girl"	4:37
13.	"You Ain't For Me"	6:55
