= Granville (band) =

French musical group

- Origin: Caen, France
- Genres: Pop
- Years active: 2011–present
- Labels: East West
- Members: Mélissa Dubourg; Sofian El Gharrafi; Arthur Allizard

Granville is a French pop band formed in Caen in January 2011 and made up of Mélissa Dubourg (vocals), Sofian El Gharrafi (singer-songwriter, guitar, keyboards), Nathan Bellanger (bass) and Arthur Allizard (drums). Sofian and Nathan, were earlier in the band Chocolate Donuts. The name is a tribute Granville, Manche in Lower Normandy where all members find attachment. They play mostly 1960s-influenced music described by Le Point as a mix of "Anglo-saxon rock-garage music and melodies of French yéyé revisited". Another magazine Les Inrockuptibles called their music "disc pop very precisely American charm that brought a West Coast wind, it is a dozen romantic and naive ballads".

They became popular taking part in many festivals and music events. In 2012, Granville performed at Festival Papillons de nuit and Rock en Seine. Their debut single was "Jersey" that was released on 6 June 2012, a tribute to the island of Jersey near Normandie. Signed to the label East West, owned by Warner Music, they released their debut album Les Voiles on 4 February 2013.

== Discography ==
=== Albums ===
Year	Album	Chart peak FR	Certification
2013	Les voiles	80	

=== Singles ===
Year	Single	Chart peak FR	Certification	Album
2012	"Jersey"	–		Les voiles
