= Yeti Lane (album) =

Studio album by Yeti Lane
- Released: 17 September 2009 (Europe); 25 January 2010 (UK)
- Label: Clapping Music (Europe); Sonic Cathedral (UK)
- Producer: Yeti Lane

Yeti Lane chronology
Yeti Lane (2009)	The Echo Show (2012)

Professional ratings
Review scores
Source	Rating
Drowned in Sound	7/10 stars
MusicOMH	4/5 stars
NME	9/10 stars

Yeti Lane is the debut studio album by French band Yeti Lane, released on 17 September 2009 in Europe on Clapping Music, and on 25 January 2010 on Sonic Cathedral in the UK.

== Track listing ==
All tracks written and composed by Yeti Lane.

1. "First-Rate Pretender" – 3:35
2. "Twice" – 4:48
3. "Black Soul" – 4:05
4. "Think It's Done" – 4:12
5. "Tiny Correction" – 3:21
6. "Only One Look" – 4:27
7. "Lucky Bag" – 4:00
8. "Lonesome George" – 3:43
9. "Solar" – 4:06
10. "Heart's Architecture" – 4:49

== Personnel ==
- Ben Pleng – lead and backing vocals, electric and acoustic guitars, monophonic analog synth, cheap keyboards and laptop
- LoAc – lead and backing vocals, electric and acoustic guitars, electric bass, monophonic and polyphonic analog synths, digital keyboards, laptop, organ and mellotron
- Charlie B – drums and percussions, laptop, drum boxes and samplers, monophonic analog synths and organ
- Etienne "Zombie Zombie" Jaumet – alto sax on "Tiny Correction"
- Lori Sean Berg "Sans Nipple" – trumpet on "Tiny Correction"
- Cyann – piano, polyphonic analog synth, mellotron, backing vocals on "Solar" and "Heart's Architecture"
