= List of number-one albums of 2018 (Belgium) =

The Belgian Albums Chart, divided into the two main regions Flanders and Wallonia, ranks the best-performing albums in Belgium, as compiled by Ultratop.

== Flanders ==
Issue date	Album	Artist	Reference
6 January	Love Cruise	K3	
13 January	÷	Ed Sheeran	
20 January	÷	Ed Sheeran	
27 January	÷	Ed Sheeran	
3 February	÷	Ed Sheeran	
10 February	Man of the Woods	Justin Timberlake	
17 February	Man of the Woods	Justin Timberlake	
24 February	De kerk van Melculy	Fleddy Melculy	
3 March	Een ander spoor	Karen Damen	
10 March	Een ander spoor	Karen Damen	
17 March	Violence	Editors	
24 March	Een ander spoor	Karen Damen	
31 March	Night Prayer	Jasper Steverlinck	
7 April	Levenslied	Frans Bauer	
14 April	The Deconstruction	Eels	
21 April	Levenslied	Frans Bauer	
28 April	Levenslied	Frans Bauer	
5 May	10 jaar	Lindsay	
12 May	Beerbongs & Bentleys	Post Malone	
19 May	Tranquility Base Hotel & Casino	Arctic Monkeys	
26 May	Tranquility Base Hotel & Casino	Arctic Monkeys	
2 June	Shawn Mendes	Shawn Mendes	
9 June	Dertig	Niels Destadsbader	
16 June	Liefde voor muziek	Various artists	
23 June	Dertig	Niels Destadsbader	
30 June	Dertig	Niels Destadsbader	
7 July	High as Hope	Florence and the Machine	
14 July	Dertig	Niels Destadsbader	
21 July	Dertig	Niels Destadsbader	
28 July	Dertig	Niels Destadsbader	
4 August	Dertig	Niels Destadsbader	
11 August	Astroworld	Travis Scott	
18 August	Dertig	Niels Destadsbader	
25 August	Sweetener	Ariana Grande	
1 September	Country	Laura Lynn	
8 September	Kamikaze	Eminem	
15 September	Kamikaze	Eminem	
22 September	Kamikaze	Eminem	
29 September	2	Bazart	
6 October	Golden Classics in Symphony	Helmut Lotti with the Golden Symphonic Orchestra	
13 October	Golden Classics in Symphony	Helmut Lotti with the Golden Symphonic Orchestra	
20 October	Golden Classics in Symphony	Helmut Lotti with the Golden Symphonic Orchestra	
27 October	Amir	Tamino	
3 November	Golden Classics in Symphony	Helmut Lotti with the Golden Symphonic Orchestra	
10 November	Dertig	Niels Destadsbader	
17 November	We begrijpen mekaar	Tourist LeMC	
24 November	Roller Disco	K3	
1 December	Roller Disco	K3	
8 December	Roller Disco	K3	
15 December	Dertig	Niels Destadsbader	
22 December	Dertig	Niels Destadsbader	
29 December	Dertig	Niels Destadsbader	

== Wallonia ==
Issue date	Album	Artist	Reference
6 January	Les 50 plus belles chansons	Johnny Hallyday	
13 January	Les 50 plus belles chansons	Johnny Hallyday	
20 January	Les 50 plus belles chansons	Johnny Hallyday	
27 January	Raw	Typh Barrow	
3 February	Solune	Slimane	
10 February	Xeu	Vald	
17 February	Solune	Slimane	
24 February	Solune	Slimane	
3 March	Solune	Slimane	
10 March	Solune	Slimane	
17 March	Les Enfoirés 2018: Musique!	Les Enfoirés	
24 March	Les Enfoirés 2018: Musique!	Les Enfoirés	
31 March	Ceinture noire	Maître Gims	
7 April	Ceinture noire	Maître Gims	
14 April	Ceinture noire	Maître Gims	
21 April	Ceinture noire	Maître Gims	
28 April	Ceinture noire	Maître Gims	
5 May	Ceinture noire	Maître Gims	
12 May	Ceinture noire	Maître Gims	
19 May	Tranquility Base Hotel & Casino	Arctic Monkeys	
26 May	Ceinture noire	Maître Gims	
2 June	Je reviens à toi	Marc Lavoine	
9 June	Double hélice 3	Caballero & Jeanjass	
16 June	Je reviens à toi	Marc Lavoine	
23 June	Lithopédion	Damso	
30 June	Lithopédion	Damso	
7 July	Lithopédion	Damso	
14 July	Lithopédion	Damso	
21 July	Lithopédion	Damso	
28 July	Lithopédion	Damso	
4 August	Lithopédion	Damso	
11 August	Lithopédion	Damso	
18 August	Lithopédion	Damso	
25 August	Sweetener	Ariana Grande	
1 September	Au bout de nos rêves	Kids United Nouvelle Génération	
8 September	Amigo	Kendji Girac	
15 September	Amigo	Kendji Girac	
22 September	Amigo	Kendji Girac	
29 September	Chris	Christine and the Queens	
6 October	Désobéissance	Mylène Farmer	
13 October	Brol	Angèle	
20 October	Brel	Maurane	
27 October	Mon pays c'est l'amour	Johnny Hallyday	
3 November	Mon pays c'est l'amour	Johnny Hallyday	
10 November	Mon pays c'est l'amour	Johnny Hallyday	
17 November	Simulation Theory	Muse	
24 November	Mon pays c'est l'amour	Johnny Hallyday	
1 December	Mon pays c'est l'amour	Johnny Hallyday	
8 December	Mon pays c'est l'amour	Johnny Hallyday	
15 December	Mon pays c'est l'amour	Johnny Hallyday	
22 December	Mon pays c'est l'amour	Johnny Hallyday	
29 December	Mon pays c'est l'amour	Johnny Hallyday	

== See also ==
- List of Ultratop 50 number-one singles of 2018
