= Yeti Lane =

- Origin: Paris, France
- Genres: Indie pop, psychedelic rock, shoegazing, krautrock
- Years active: 2008—present
- Labels: Sonic Cathedral, Clapping Music
- Members: Charlie Boyer; Ben Pleng
- Past members: Loïc Carron
- Website: yetilane.com

Yeti Lane are a French rock band from Paris, formed in 2008 and consisting of Ben Pleng (vocals/guitars/keyboards/programming) and Charlie B (drums/percussion/keyboards/programming).

== History ==
The members of the band were originally in the quartet Cyann & Ben. When singer Cyann quit the band early in 2008, the remaining three members renamed themselves Yeti Lane and guitarist/keyboard player Ben Pleng took over on vocals. The name comes from records by two of their favourite groups, Yeti by Amon Düül II and "Penny Lane" by the Beatles. Their eponymous debut album was released in France in 2009, and in the UK the following year. Shortly after the album's release, Loïc Carron (aka LoAc) also left the band, leaving Pleng and Charlie Boyer (aka Charlie B) to carry on as a duo. The band altered their musical direction, moving away from indie pop to a more experimental "shoegazing" psychedelic rock sound. The first release from the duo was the Twice EP, released in May 2010 and featuring a re-recorded version of the track on their debut album. Their second full-length album, The Echo Show, was released on 5 March 2012, and their third full-length album, L'Aurore, was released on 4 March 2016.

== Discography ==
=== Albums ===
- Yeti Lane (2009 in Europe, 2010 in the UK)
- The Echo Show (2012)
- L'Aurore (2016)

=== EPs ===
- Twice (2010)

=== Singles ===
- "Lonesome George" (2009)
- "First-Rate Pretender" (2010)

=== Compilations ===
- Stoned - Psych Versions of the Rolling Stones (2015) with the song "Sway"
