= Rendez-Vous (band) =

French band

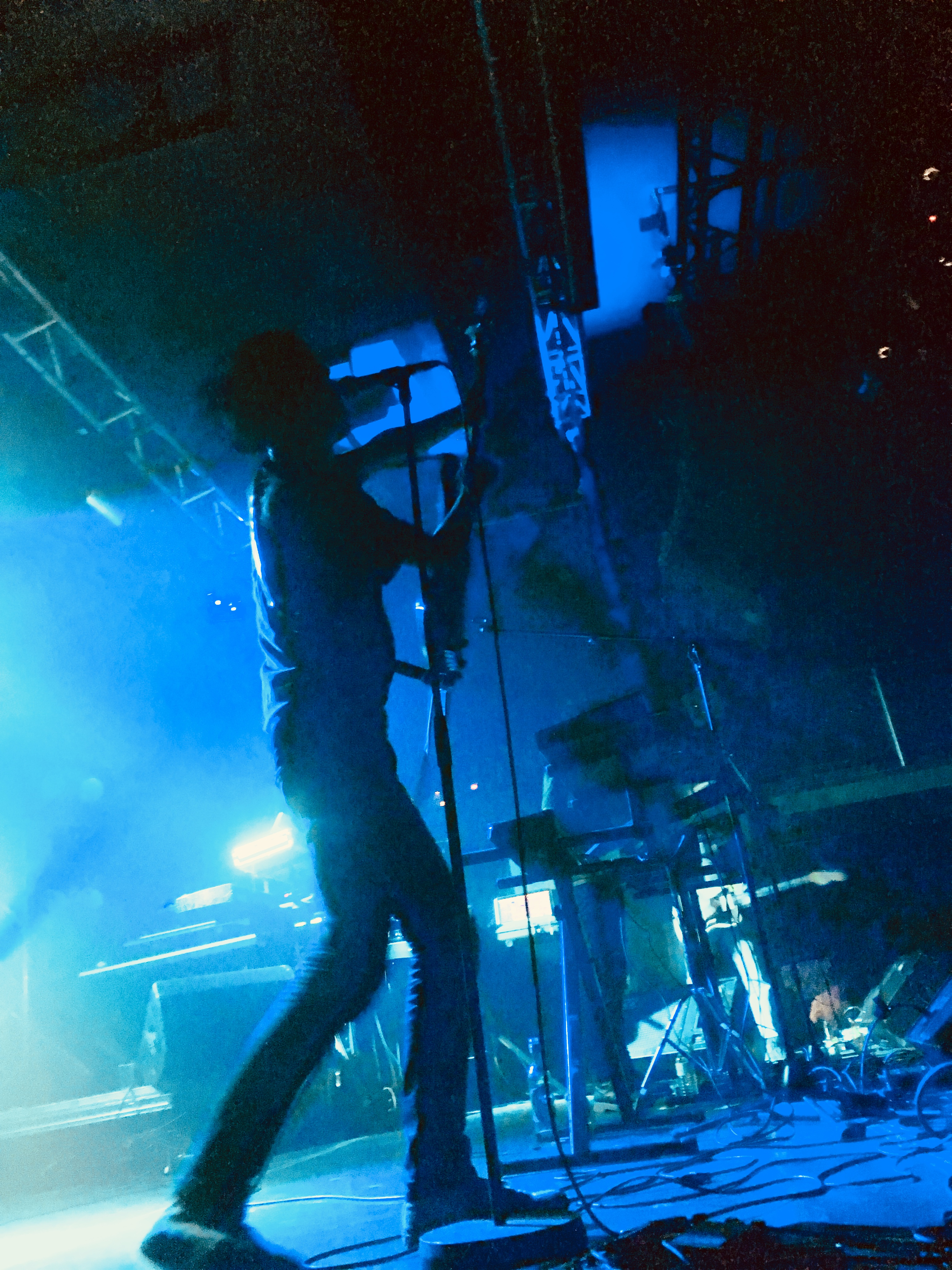
- Rendez-Vous performs at Machine du Moulin Rouge in Paris

Background information
- Origin: Paris, France
- Genres: Post-punk, Dark wave
- Years active: 2012–present
- Labels: Zappruder Records, AVANT! Records, Crybaby, Wedge, ATF
- Members: Francis Mallari; Elliot Berthault; Maxime Gendre; Simon Dubourg

Rendez-Vous is a French post-punk band from Paris, France, formed in 2012.

== History ==
Rendez-Vous was founded in 2012 by Francis Mallari and Elliot Bethault. A few months later, they added Maxime Gendre and Simon Dubourg. The band released their first EP in 2014, Rendez-Vous, for Zappruder Records. The band started touring across Europe in the summer of 2015.

In 2016, Rendez-Vous released a second EP, Distance, mixed by Ben Greenberg from The Men, for their new label AVANT! Records. The self-titled single "Distance" was included in Les Inrockuptibles magazine's "100 best songs of the year".

In 2017, the single "The Others" was used by Burger Records to represent France for the Burger World Compilation.

In June 2018, Rendez-Vous released "Double Zero", extracted from their first LP, Superior State. The title track was released on September 14. On October 24, it released "Sentimental Animal" with a video clip in which members of the band appeared for the first time. Clash named it track of the day.

== Superior State ==
Rendez-Vous' first album, Superior State, was released on 26 October 2018 on the group's own label, Artefact, in co-production with the Parisian label CryBaby.

Superior State ranked number 1 in Post-Punk.com's list of the best albums of 2018. Les Inrockuptibles ranked the album third in its 2018 "TOP 20 Chansons". Rendez-Vous is the first French group in this ranking.

== Discography ==
Rendez-Vous (2014)
| No. | Title | Length |
|---|---|---|
| 1. | "The Others" | 3:41 |
| 2. | "Plasticity" | 3:11 |
| 3. | "White Dress" | 3:26 |
| 4. | "Donna" | 4:31 |
| 5. | "Youth" | 5:04 |
| Total length: | | 18:26 |

Distance (2016)
| No. | Title | Length |
|---|---|---|
| 1. | "Distance" | 3:28 |
| 2. | "Workout" | 4:34 |
| 3. | "Foreseen Death" | 4:40 |
| 4. | "Euroshima" | 3:42 |
| 5. | "Demian" | 3:44 |
| 6. | "Ignorance & Cruelty" | 4:49 |
| Total length: | | 26:28 |

Superior State (2018)
| No. | Title | Length |
|---|---|---|
| 1. | "Double Zero" |
| 2. | "Paralysed" |
| 3. | "Sentimental Animal" |
| 4. | "Last Stop" |
| 5. | "Superior State" |
| 6. | "Crisis" |
| 7. | "Middle Class" |
| 8. | "Lakes" |
| 9. | "Exuviæ" |
| 10. | "Order Of Baël" |
| Total length: | | 42:16 |

Downcast (2024)
| No. | Title | Length |
|---|---|---|
| 1. | "aiw777" | 4:39 |
| 2. | "Sheer" | 2:54 |
| 3. | "Downcast" | 4:04 |
| 4. | "Dye And Retry" | 2:37 |
| 5. | "Ur Cross" | 3:20 |
| 6. | "Nothing." | 4:37 |
| 7. | "Smoke'Em Heads" | 3:23 |
| 8. | "Top Range DNA" | 2:49 |
| 9. | "The House Has Burned Down" | 3:04 |
| 10. | "Stay A Rat" | 3:26 |
| 11. | "Carry The Zero" | 4:36 |
| Total length: | | 39:33 |
