= Hit Sale =

Single by Therapie Taxi featuring Roméo Elvis

from the album Hit Sale
- Released: 2017
- Recorded: 2017
- Genre: Pop, electropop
- Label: Panenka Music; Wagram
- Songwriters: Roméo Elvis; Raphael Faget-Zaoui; Adelaide Chabannes de Balsac; Renaud Bizart; Félix Gros

Roméo Elvis singles chronology
"Méchant" (2017)	"Hit Sale" (2018)	"Dessert" (2018)

Music video
- "Hit Sale" on YouTube

"Hit Sale" is a French language hit by the French band Therapie Taxi featuring additional vocals by Belgian rapper Roméo Elvis. The song is also the lead track of the same titled album Hit Sale released by Therapie Taxi. The single has topped Ultratop's Wallonia Singles Chart in addition to charting in France.

== Charts ==
=== Weekly charts ===
Chart (2017–2018)	Peak position
Belgium (Ultratop 50 Wallonia)	1
France (SNEP)	18

=== Year-end charts ===
Chart (2018)	Position
Belgium (Ultratop Wallonia)	8

== Certifications ==
Region	Certification	Certified units/sales
Belgium (BRMA)	Gold	10,000^{‡}
France (SNEP)	Diamond	333,333^{‡}
^{‡} Sales+streaming figures based on certification alone.

== See also ==
- List of Ultratop 50 number-one singles of 2018
