= Fauve (musician) =

Nicolas Julliard better known by his stage name Fauve (born in Geneva, Switzerland on 21 March 1972) is a Swiss musician and singer.

He studied art history in addition to learning classic guitar and in 1999, launched his own record label Snowcat Records, with his first release being the single "Graceland" under the pseudonym Sombre. He was also part of Illford, a post-rock band based in Lausanne, where he was a guitarist.

Taking the stage name Fauve, in May 2006, he released his debut self-titled solo album Fauve on the Lausanne-based Gentlemen Records. After joining French singer Dominique A in carte blanche during Fnac Indétendances festival at Paris-Plages, in July 2007, her appeared in Montreux Jazz Festival, under the billing Fauve & Raphelson featuring Erik Truffaz, Sophie Hunger, John Parish and the Lausanne Sinfonietta. A double CD and DVD of the concert titled An Evening At The Montreux Jazz Festival 2007 was released by Gentlemen Records in November 2007.

In 2008, Fauve wrote and performed a soundtrack for the Alfred Hitchcock silent film The Lodger: A Story of the London Fog and in 2010, accompanied the Swiss singer Olivia Pedroli in her tour and remixed for électro artist POL and in 2011, collaborated with the electro artist Xewin in two tracks of Xewin's second album followed by his ow studio album Clocks'n'Clouds again on Two Gentlemen label.

== In popular culture ==
- In 2004, the French music magazine Les Inrockuptibles included one of the tracks of Julliard under his pseudonym Sombre for its second annual compilation album CQFD 2004 (standing for Ceux qu'il faut découvrir meaning those that need to be discovered).
- In 2012, Fauve created the soundtrack for the Fribourg International Film festival (FIFF).

== Discography ==
Studio albums

- 2006: Fauve
- 2011: Clocks'n'Clouds
- 2020: Covers & Leftovers 2003-2014

Live albums

- 2007: An Evening at the Montreux Jazz Festival 2007 (with Raphelson)

EP and maxis

- 2001: Graceland EP
- 2004: Acoustica #1

Remixes

- 2010: Stupid Folked-Up remix (for POL)
- 2011: You Caught Me remix (for Olivia Pedroli)

Appearances

- 2004: "Cyberite" (credited as Sombre) in CQFD 2004 (Ceux qu'il faut découvrir) - compilation du magazine Les Inrockuptibles
- 2006: FNAC Indétendances
- 2006: "Beyond Thirty" on Amazon Grace
- 2007: "Retreat" on The Pet Series Volume 6
- 2011: "Johnny Guitar" on Le Lustre
- 2012: "Skull" in tribute album A Tribute to Sebadoh's Bakesale
- 2013: "Between My Legs" in The LP Collection Vol. 1
