= Therapie Taxi =

French musical band

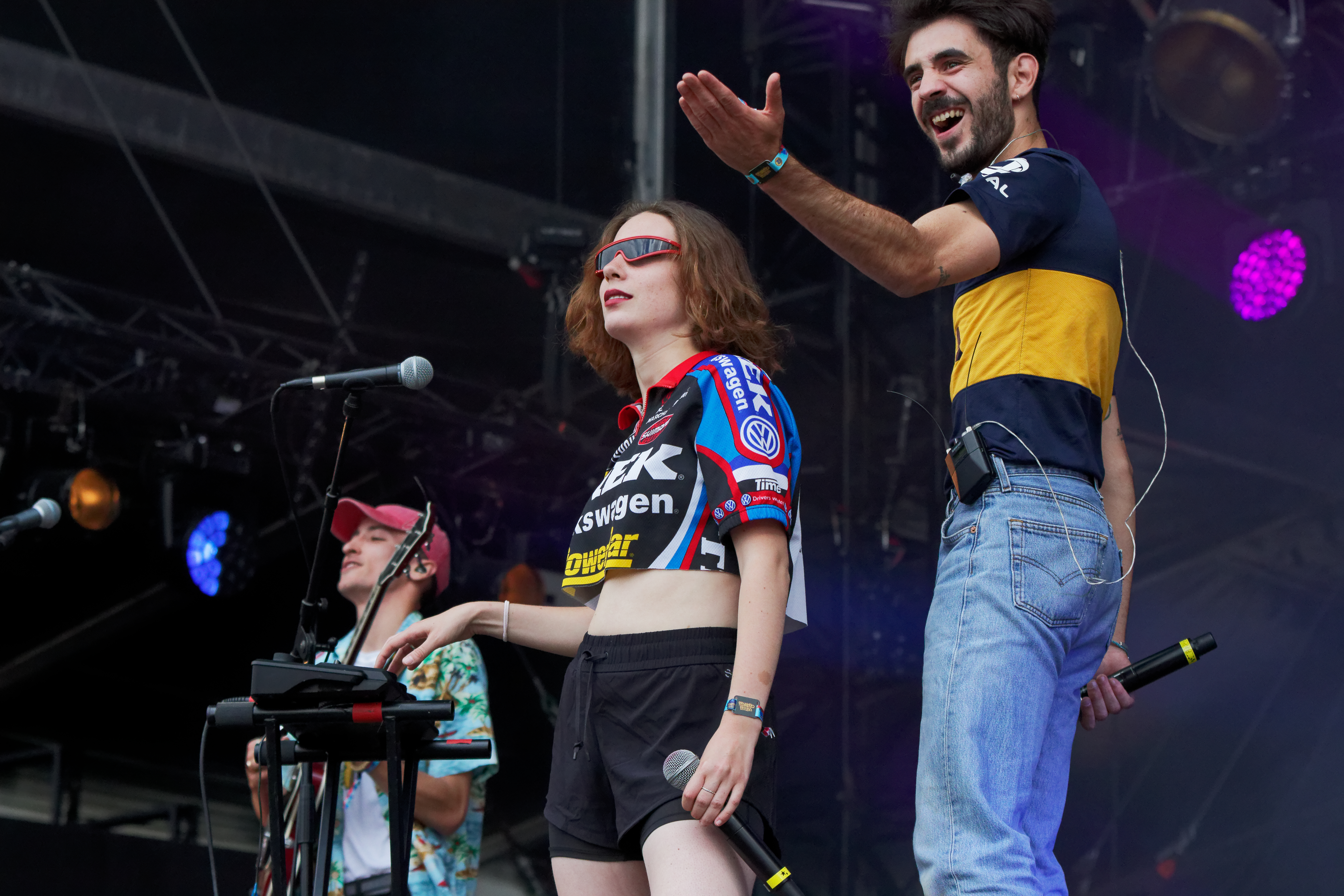
- Therapie Taxi at Festival Vielles Charrues, 2018

Background information
- Origin: Paris, France
- Genres: Rock, Pop, hip hop
- Years active: 2016-2021
- Labels: Panenka, Wagram
- Past members: Adélaïde Chabannes de Balsac (singer); Raphaël Faget-Zaoui (singer); Renaud Bizart; Vincent Duteuil; Ilan Rabaté; Félix Gros; Joseph Signoret
- Website: www.therapietaxi.com

Therapie Taxi (sometimes stylized as Therapie TAXI) was a French musical group mixing many genres including pop, rock and hip-hop formed in 2016. They released two albums, two EPs, and a number of singles, most notably "Hit Sale". They announced their break-up in 2020.

== Career ==
In December 2012, Adélaïde Chabannes posted an ad on EasyZic, a social media site for musicians seeking bandmates. Raphaël Faget-Zaoui responded and they collaborated establishing the band Milky Way. In 2016 they added Félix Gros (guitar and keyboards) and Renaud Bizart (drums) to the line-up and launched Therapie Taxi. Their debut single was "Salop(e)", released with Panenka Music.

In March 2017, they released their self-titled EP and promoted it at local gigs and festivals like Rock en Seine. Their collaboration with Roméo Elvis, single "Hit Sale", gave them their biggest known hit. The music video also proved very popular. The song was certified gold both in France and in French Belgian markets. It was the titular single from their album Hit Sale, released in 2018, accompanied by a tour and a prestigious appearance at la Maroquinerie, a famous venue in Paris. The album proved popular and a new edition of the album was launched on 16 November 2018 with additional eight tracks and two remixes by Yuksek and Contrefaçon.

In 2019, they engaged in a grand tour that also culminated in a concert at the Zenith in Paris and various appearances including at Solidays and Garorock. At the end of the tour, the departure of touring musicians Vincent Duteuil and Ilan Rabaté was announced. In 2019, they were nominated for the "Revelation Live" category during Victoires de la musique 2019.

Cadavre exquis was their 16-track second studio album, released on 6 December 2019. The tour associated with the release was cancelled because of the COVID-19 pandemic.

The group bid farewell with a 7-track EP Rupture 2 Merde, a single, "Été 90", and a music video.

== Discography ==
=== Albums ===
Year	Album / Mixtape	Peak positions			Certification
Year	Album / Mixtape	FRA	BEL (Wa)	SWI	Certification
2018	Hit Sale	23	27	–	SNEP: 3xPlatinumx
2019	Cadavre exquis	22	53	95	

=== EPs ===
Year	Album / Mixtape	Peak positions		Certification
Year	Album / Mixtape	FRA	BEL (Wa)	Certification
2017	Therapie Taxi - EP	–	–	
2021	Rupture 2 merde	5	7	

=== Singles ===
Year	Album / Mixtape	Peak positions		Album / Mixtape
Year	Album / Mixtape	FRA	BEL (Wa)	Album / Mixtape
2017	"Hit Sale"	12	1	Hit Sale
2021	"Été 90"	22	6 (Ultratip*)	Rupture 2 merde

*Did not appear in the official Belgian Ultratop 50 charts, but rather in the bubbling under Ultratip charts.

=== Other songs ===
Year	Album / Mixtape	Peak positions		Album / Mixtape
Year	Album / Mixtape	FRA	BEL (Wa)	Album / Mixtape
2018	"Salop(e)"	163	Tip	Hit Sale
2018	"Avec ta zouz"	185	–	NRJ Music Awards 2018 - 20th Edition
2018	"Chula"	191	–	
2019	"Egotrip"	166	–	Cadavre exquis
2019	"Candide Crush"	125	9 (Ultratip*)	Cadavre exquis

*Did not appear in the official Belgian Ultratop 50 charts, but rather in the bubbling under Ultratip charts.
