= Naive New Beaters =

French electronic pop band

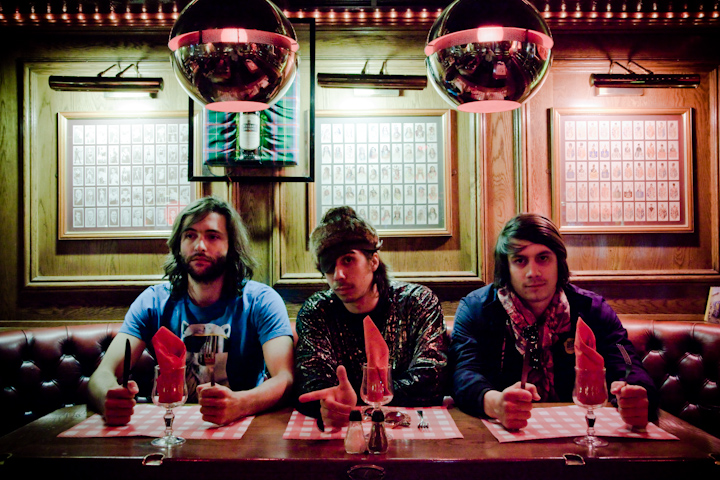
- Naive New Beaters

Background information
- Origin: Paris, France
- Genres: Electronic music, pop, rock, hip hop
- Years active: 2000s–present
- Label: Cinq7, Capitol
- Members: David Boring; Martin Luther B.B. King; Eurobelix

Naive New Beaters are a French electronic pop band from Paris, consisting of David Boring (vocals), Martin Luther B.B. King (guitar) and Eurobelix (keyboards and electronic instruments). Their music combines elements of electronic music, pop, rock and hip hop.

The three members met while attending high school in Paris. The band released Wallace in 2009, followed by La Onda (2012), À la folie (2016), Fun Hours (2019) and FVTVRVM (2024).

== History ==
=== Early career and Wallace ===
David Boring, Martin Luther B.B. King and Eurobelix met while attending high school in Paris. The group developed a style combining electronic music, rock, pop and hip hop. In 2009, Le Monde profiled the band while it was touring France, describing its music as a mixture of hip hop and electro-rock and noting that the group performed primarily in English.

The same year, Télérama devoted an edition of its electronic-music programme Bien ou bien to Naive New Beaters ahead of the band's summer festival appearances.

Their album Wallace was released in 2009 on Cinq7. The band subsequently toured extensively in France and abroad.

=== "La Onda" ===
Naive New Beaters released La Onda on 24 September 2012. The album included the songs "Jersey", "La Onda" and "Shit Happens".

During this period, the group also presented La Onda Radio Show on French rock radio station OÜI FM. The programme was among several projects undertaken by the band alongside touring, and OÜI FM also reported the release of the collaborative mixtape The Guest List, which featured guests including Oxmo Puccino and Adrien Gallo.

The band also performed as a support act for The Smashing Pumpkins during the latter's French tour in 2013.

=== À la folie ===
The band's third studio album, À la folie, was released in 2016. Le Parisien reviewed the album positively, characterising its music as electro-pop and noting a more melancholic element than in the band's earlier work.

One of the album's principal singles was "Heal Tomorrow", a collaboration with French singer Izïa. Its music video used an interactive 360-degree format.

"Heal Tomorrow" was certified diamond in France by the Syndicat national de l'édition phonographique (SNEP).

À la folie was certified gold in France by the SNEP.

Naive New Beaters performed at Rock en Seine in August 2016.

=== Fun Hours ===
The band's fourth studio album, Fun Hours, was released in 2019. Writing about the album, Le Point described Naive New Beaters as an established presence in the French pop scene following "Heal Tomorrow".

The album included "Make Way", featuring Belgian rapper JeanJass, as well as "Addicted to Joy" and "I See Fire", featuring Ana Zimmer.

=== FVTVRVM ===
After a five-year gap between studio albums, Naive New Beaters released their fifth studio album, FVTVRVM, in June 2024. The album retained the band's mixture of electronic music, pop and rock, while incorporating longer introductions and less conventional song structures.

The album included "Dancing" and "Ye Kou Si Kuo", a collaboration with the Beninese group Star Feminine Band.

The animated music video for "Ye Kou Si Kuo", directed by Lola Lefèvre, received the MV Award at the 2024 Feinaki Beijing Animation Week.

Naive New Beaters toured in support of FVTVRVM, including a concert at the Olympia in Paris on 26 November 2024.

In June 2024, David Boring, who also works as an actor under the name Estéban, discussed his work with Naive New Beaters in a 58-minute interview on France Culture.

== Musical style ==
Naive New Beaters' music combines elements of electronic music, pop, rock and hip hop. Le Monde described the band's early sound as a combination of hip hop and electro-rock, while Le Parisien characterised À la folie as electro-pop.

The band's visual presentation and stage personas have also been a recurring part of its work. The three musicians perform under the names David Boring, Martin Luther B.B. King and Eurobelix.

== Members ==
- David Boring – vocals
- Martin Luther B.B. King – guitar
- Eurobelix – keyboards, electronic instruments

== Discography ==
=== Studio albums ===
- Wallace (2009)
- La Onda (2012)
- À la folie (2016) – SNEP: Gold
- Fun Hours (2019)
- FVTVRVM (2024)

=== Selected singles ===
- "Live Good" (2007)
- "Bang Bang" (2007)
- "Get Love" (2009)
- "Just Another Day" (2010)
- "Jersey" (2012)
- "La Onda" (2012)
- "Shit Happens" (2013)
- "Run Away" (2015)
- "Heal Tomorrow" featuring Izïa (2016) – SNEP: Diamond
- "Montecristo" (2016)
- "Make Way" featuring JeanJass (2019)
- "Addicted to Joy" (2019)
- "I See Fire" featuring Ana Zimmer (2019)
- "One Way to Go" (2020)
- "Dancing" (2023)
- "Ye Kou Si Kuo" with Star Feminine Band (2024)
- "Such a Waste" (2024)
