= Skip the Use =

French music band

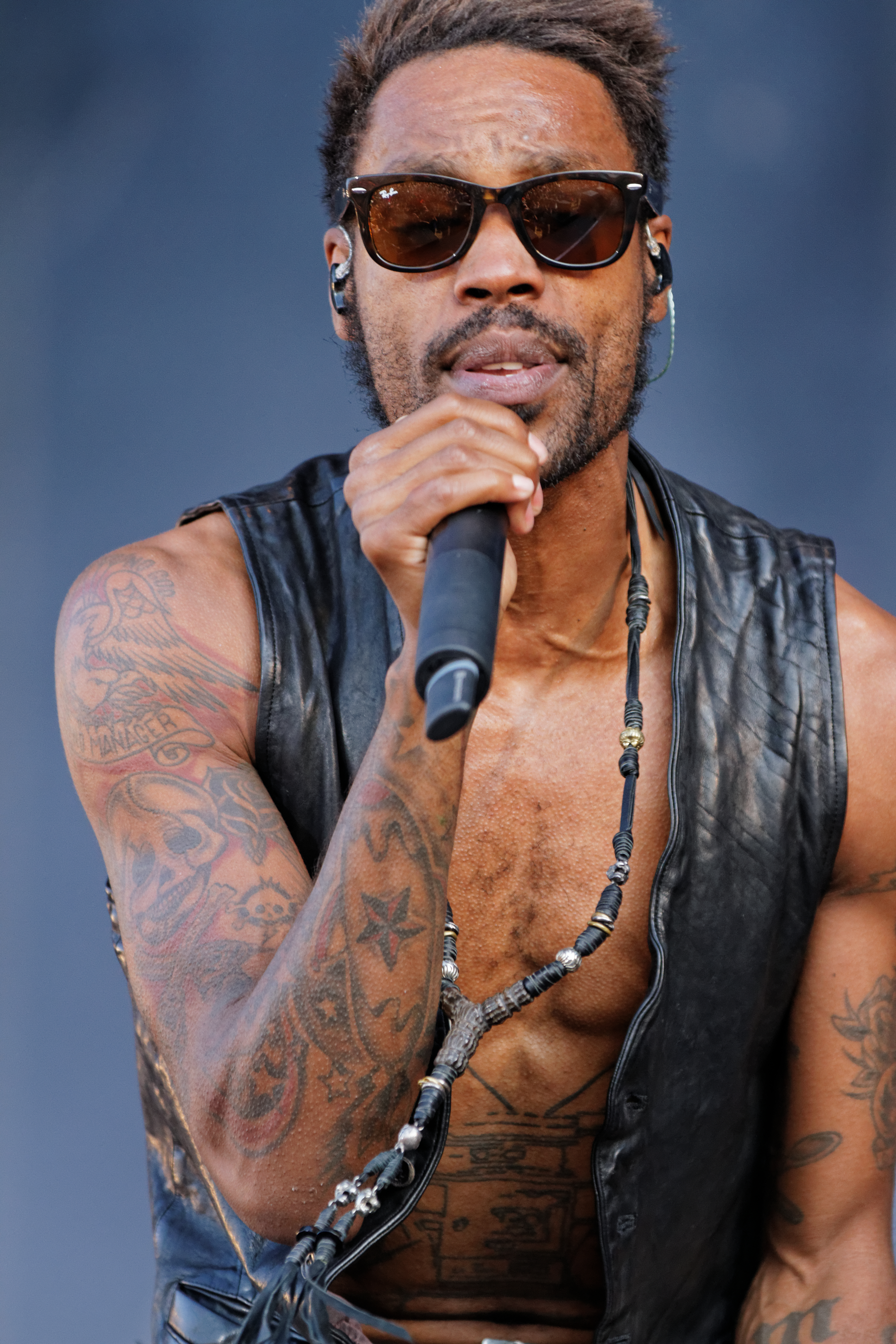
- Skip the Use in concert on the Kerouac stage during the 2014 Vieilles Charrues festival.

Background information
- Origin: Ronchin, Hauts-de-France, France
- Genres: Rock, punk rock, electro
- Years active: 2008–2016, 2018–present
- Labels: Polydor; Universal Music Group
- Spinoff of: Carving
- Members: Mat Bastard; Yan Stefani; Nelson Martins; Enzo Gabert
- Past members: Jay Gimenez; Lio Raepsaet; Manamax Catteloin
- Website: skiptheuse.fr

Skip the Use is a French band with electro funk, rock and punk influences founded in 2008 with musicians from Ronchin, near Lille and made up of Mat Bastard (vocals), Yan Stefani (guitar), Nelson Martins (bass) and Enzo Gabert (drums). The band is signed with Polydor and has distribution arrangement with Universal Music.

== Career ==
The five members used to play in punk band Carving. They released their debut eponymous album Skip the Use produced by CALYSTA and NPE. The latter also organized their French tour and other tours in countries such as Canada, Belgium, Germany, Hungary, Lithuania for the promotion of their album recorded in YellowSub studios with Yves Jaget and Manu Guiot member of NPE, and released 5 October 2009. They also took part in a string of music festivals allowing them to gain fame.

In early 2011, they launched a well-followed blog and a single "Give Me Your Life" accompanied by a music video and in October of same year the EP Sound from the Shadow on Polydor with 5 tracks made available on digital download although limited edition CD was made of the EP but available only at live concerts of the band.

In January 2012, they were nominated for 'best live group or artist revelation of the year' at Victoires de la musique. "Ghost" launched at French TV entertainment show Taratata accompanied by a choir. This was a prerelease for their album Can Be Late released on 6 February 2012. A limited edition also offered an 8-track of live renditions during a concert at Paris' Moulin Rouge La Machine venue on 27 October 2011.

== In popular culture ==
- The music of "Give Me", a Skip the Use track was used in promoting Noel dernier cri for Canal +
- The same song "Give Me" also became the tune for June TV's show Bienvenue dans la Ruche

== Members ==
- Mat Bastard - vocals, guitar, keyboards, programming
- Yan Stefani - guitar, keyboards, backing vocals
- Nelson Martins - bass, backing vocals
- Enzo Gabert - drums

== Former Members ==
- Jay Gimenez - bass, backing vocals
- Lio Raepsaet - keyboards, synthesizers, samples, laptop computer, saxophone, backing vocals
- Manamax Catteloin - drums

== Discography ==
=== Albums ===
Studio

Title	Details	Peak chart positions		Certification	Notes
Title	Details	BEL (Wa)	FRA	Certification	Notes
Skip the Use	Released: 5 October 2009; Label: CALYSTA music / NPE; Format: CD	—	—		
Can Be Late	Released: 6 February 2012; Label: Polydor; Format: CD	80	35		With limited edition bonus, a 2nd CD of 8-track live show at Paris' Moulin Rouge La Machine venue
Little Armageddon	Released: 24 February 2014; Label: Polydor; Format: CD	17	8	FRA: Gold	
Past & Future	Released: 18 October 2019; Label: Polydor; Format: Digital download, streaming	—	57		

Live

Title	Details	Peak chart positions
Title	Details	FRA
Little Armageddon Tour	Released: 9 February 2015; Label: Polydor; Format: CD	62

=== EPs ===
Title	Details	Peak chart positions	Notes
Title	Details	FRA	Notes
Sound from the Shadow	Released: October 2011; Label: Polydor; Format: Digital download CD (limited edition)	197	Limited edition CD format available only at band's live concerts

=== Singles ===
Year	Single	Peak chart positions		Album
Year	Single	BEL (Wa)	FRA	Album
2012	"Ghost"	46	24	Can Be Late
2012	"Give Me Your Life"	—	173	Can Be Late
2013	"Cup of Coffee"	—	72	Can Be Late
2013	"Nameless World"	58*	42	Little Armageddon
2014	"The Story of Gods and Men"	—	149	Little Armageddon

*Did not appear in the official Belgian Ultratop 50 charts, but rather in the bubbling under Ultratip charts. Added 50 position to actual Ultratip position.
