= Stuck in the Sound =

French Indie Rock band

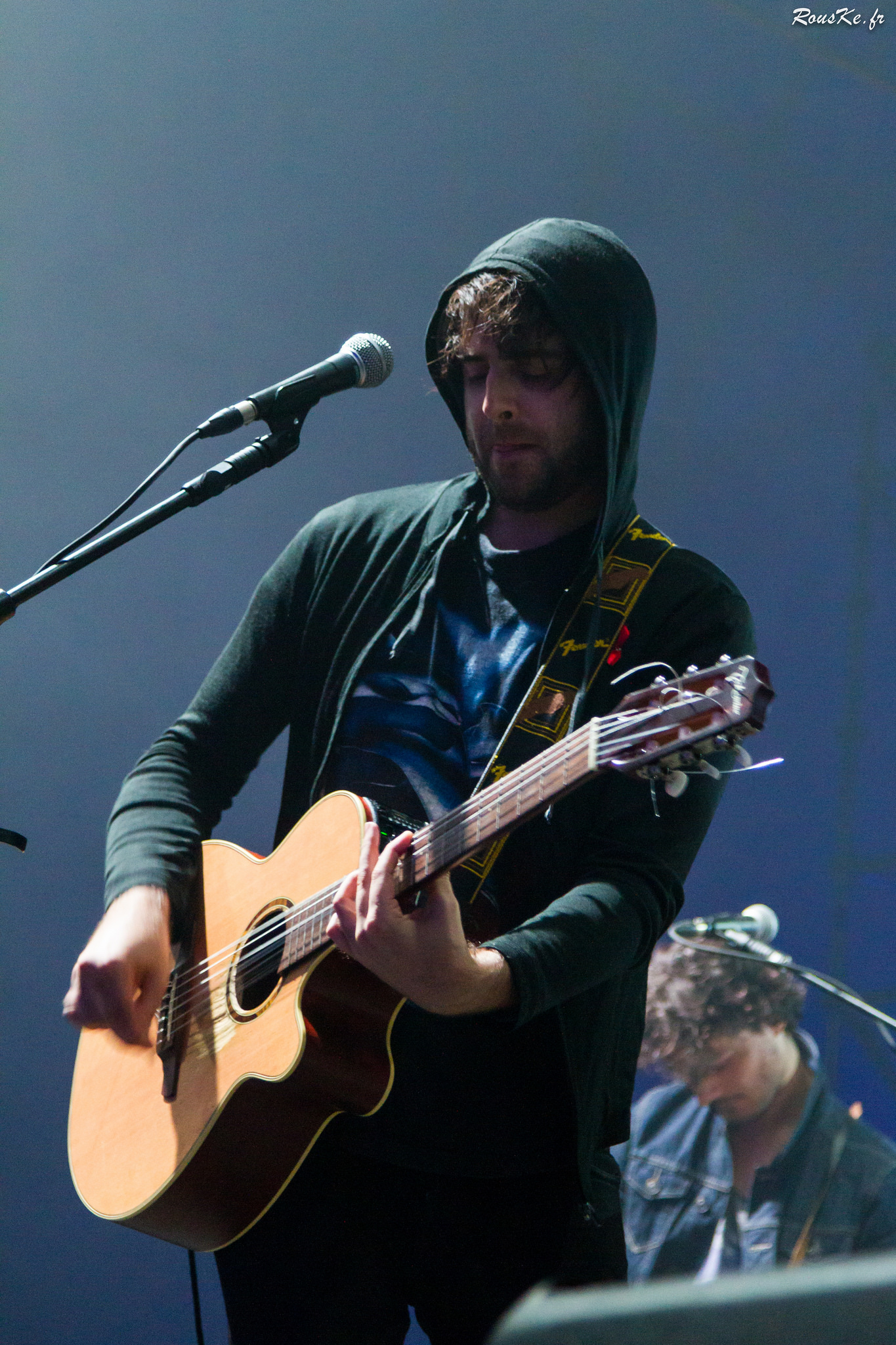
- José Pedro Fontão of Stuck In The Sound, 2012.

Background information
- Origin: Paris, France
- Genre: Indie rock
- Years active: 2001–present
- Labels: Stuck Records; It's Record; Discograph; Upton Park
- Members: José Pedro Fontão; Emmanuel Barichasse; François Ernie; Romain Della Valle
- Past members: Arno Bordas; Lucas Barbier
- Website: http://www.stuckinthesound.com/

Stuck in the Sound is a French indie rock band formed in Paris in 2001. The current band line up consists of José Pedro Fontão (lead vocals and guitar), Emmanuel Barichasse (lead guitar and piano), Marine Danet (bass guitar), Romain Della Valle (guitar, keyboards, occasional vocals) and François Ernie (drums and backing vocals). The group are presently signed to Discograph Records and have to date released six studio albums; their first commercially released album Stuck In The Sound was released in 2004 and their most recent album, 16 Dreams A Minute, was released in 2024. During June 2023, the band decided to dismiss Arno Bordas, the founder bass player, following artistic and relation discrepancies.

== History ==
Stuck in the Sound were formed in Paris in 2001. The four group members shared a love of the band Nirvana and its lead singer Kurt Cobain. The name "Stuck in the Sound" came from the fact that when the band first started they locked themselves in a cellar and made music, so they were literally "stuck in the sound". The group released their eponymous début studio album on 1 October 2004, on a compact disc produced by the band's own record label, Stuck Records. Some time after this, the band were signed by French record label Discograph. On 6 September 2006 the band released their first extended play, the Toy Boy EP, which contained four tracks, three of them from their second album.

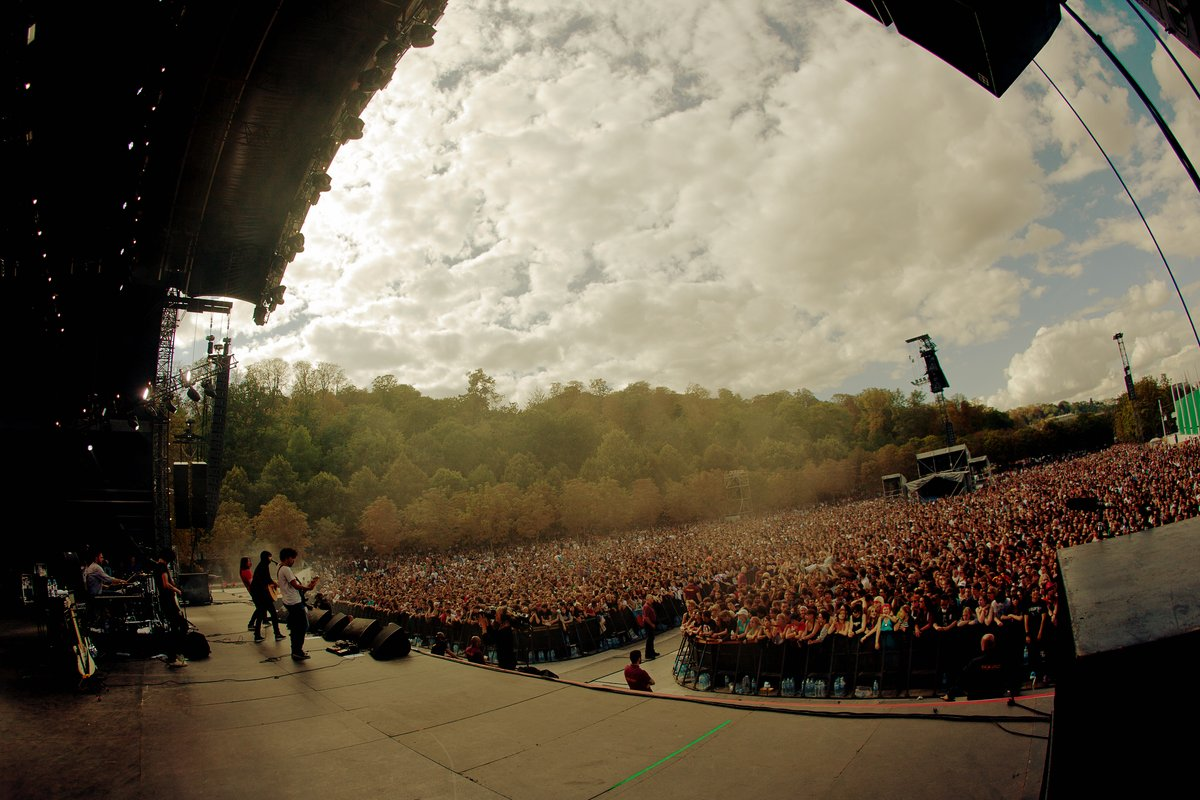
Stuck In The Sound performing at Rock En Seine Festival in 2012.

Two months to the day after the release of the EP their second, although first commercially released, studio album Nevermind the Living Dead was released as a download, CD and LP in France and as a download in a number of other countries. Despite the album failing to enter any national charts, a number of tracks from Nevermind the Living Dead were featured on various compilation albums; "Never On the Radio" appeared on the Les Inrockuptibles Made In France compilation and "Toy Boy" was included on EMI France's L'Alternative Rock collection. In 2008, the song "Toy Boy" was included on the soundtrack of the video game Guitar Hero World Tour.

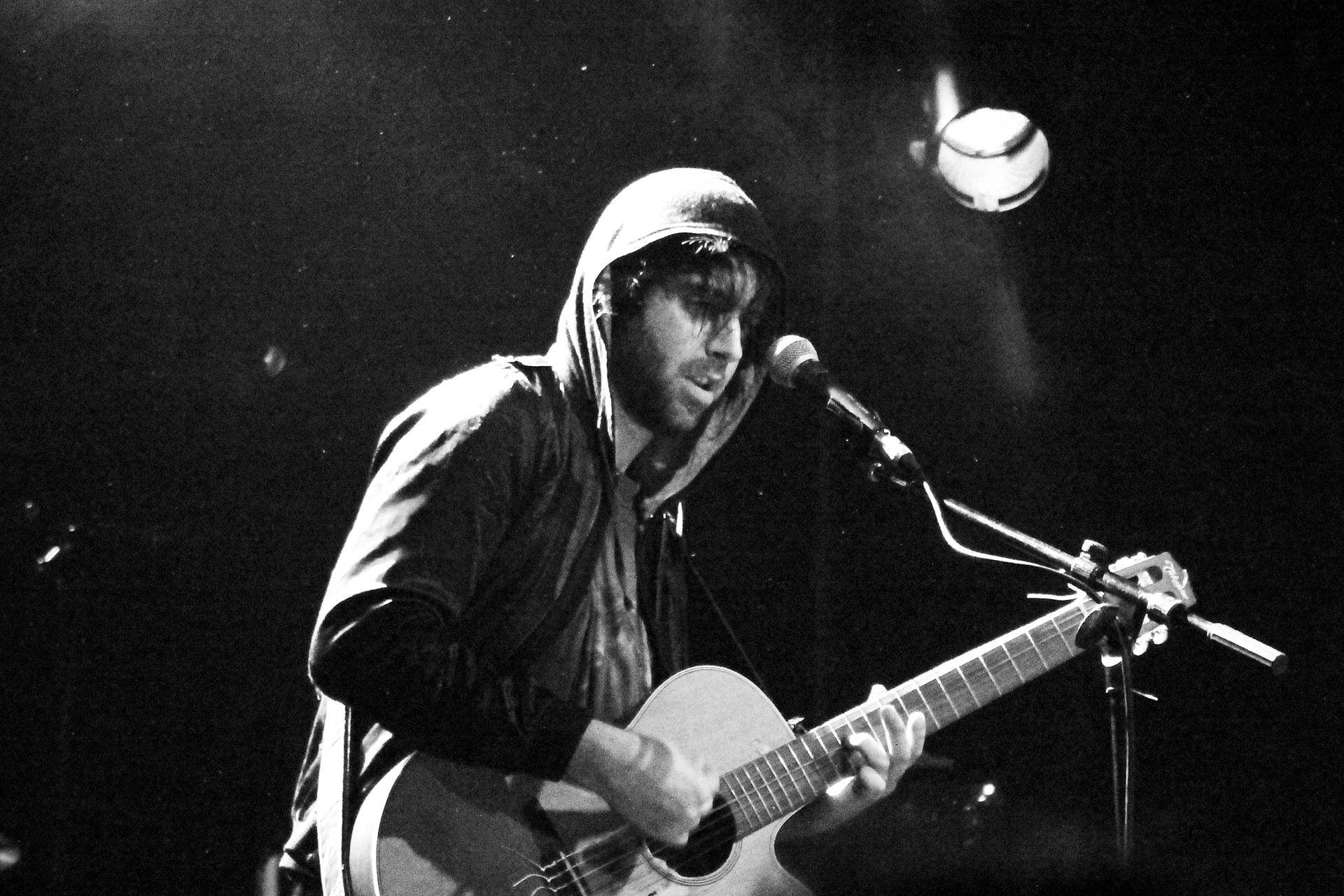
Stuck In The Sound performing in 2012.

During the same year, the band began recording their third studio album. They released the single "Ouais" on 1 December 2008 to precede the album and on 26 January 2009, Shoegazing Kids was released to moderate commercial success, achieving a peak position of No. 69 on the French album chart and staying in the Top 200 for a total of six weeks. In France, the album sold over 10,000 copies. "Shoot Shoot", the second single from Shoegazing Kids was brought out on 29 June 2009. It helped establish a reputation and paved the way for a major international tour (France, Switzerland, Belgium, Germany, Austria).

With the 2012 album "Pursuit", the band introduced a style of composition which focused on a more solid, hard-rock basis, as opposed to their previous indie sound. 2016's "Survivor" (the first album to feature longtime collaborator Romain Della Valle) shifted the music of Stuck in the Sound - fully assumed in the mantle of pop, proffering a well-polished album.

Their fifth album, "Billy Believe", was released in March 2019. The album had elements of indie pop rock, and the video for lead single Alright has more than 4 million views on YouTube.

In June 2021, the singer José Pedro Fontão released his first solo album "Primeiro Disco". The total commercial failure of this LP led the band's return to the studio for a new LP and a new artistic direction.

In June 2023, the four remaining members decided to dismiss the band founder Arno Bordas after working together for 22 years. Arno Bordas has been bass player, uncredited recording sound engineer and mixer. He's built 2 recording studios and since 2001, was one of the most active members of the band. He has since been replaced by Marine Danet, who has performed with the band throughout their 2024 tour, and performs additional vocal parts live.

2024's "16 Dreams A Minute" completely shifted the band's style - they swapped instruments and essentially experimented with whatever alternate style of music was at interest. Much of the album has a pop sound, yet numerous tracks mirror elements of sounds heard on previous records, and a handful of songs carry a heavy rock sound.

== Discography ==
=== Studio albums ===
- Stuck in the Sound (2004)
- Nevermind the Living Dead (2006)
- Shoegazing Kids (2009)
- Pursuit (2012)
- Survivor (2016)
- Billy Believe (2019)
- 16 Dreams a Minute (2024)

=== Extended plays ===
- Toy Boy (2006)
