= List of gothic country artists =

Gothic country is a genre of country music rooted in early jazz, gospel, Americana, gothic rock, and post-punk. Its lyrics often focus on dark subject matters.

== Artists ==
- 16 Horsepower
- The Builders and the Butchers
- Ethel Cain
- Johnny Cash
- Clover-Lynn
- Delaney Davidson
- DeVotchKa
- Bobbie Gentry
- The Gun Club
- The Handsome Family
- Heathen Apostles
- Iron & Wine
- Legendary Shack Shakers
- Mercury Rev
- Murder by Death
- O'Death
- The Protomen
- Will Oldham
- Slim Cessna's Auto Club
- Smog
- Jesse Sykes
- Tarnation
- Those Poor Bastards
- Adia Victoria
- Wovenhand
