= Grant Lee Buffalo =

American rock band

- Grant Lee Buffalo, 1996

Background information
- Origin: Los Angeles, California, United States
- Genres: Alternative rock, Alternative country, Country rock, Americana
- Years active: 1991–1999, 2010–2014
- Labels: Slash, Chrysalis
- Past members: Grant-Lee Phillips; Paul Kimble; Joey Peters
- Website: grantleebuffalo.com

Shiva Burlesque
- Origin: Los Angeles, California, United States
- Genres: Rock
- Years active: 1987–1990
- Labels: Fundamental Records; Ripple Effect
- Past members: Grant-Lee Phillips; Jeffrey Clark; James Brenner; Joey Peters

Grant Lee Buffalo was an American rock band based in Los Angeles, California. Formed in 1991 from the dissolution of the earlier band Shiva Burlesque, the group's core lineup consisted of Grant-Lee Phillips (vocals and guitar), Paul Kimble (bass), and Joey Peters (drums). The band has been noted for their folk-infused rock sound, lyricism, and engagement with American historical and contemporary themes.

In the late 1980s, Jeffrey Clark, Grant-Lee Phillips, James Brenner, and Joey Peters started the rock music group Shiva Burlesque in Los Angeles, California. They released two studio albums: the self-titled Shiva Burlesque in 1987 with Nate Starkman & Son Records, and Mercury Blues, released in 1990 through Fundamental Records. Matt Snow from Q magazine highlighted The Doors and Echo & the Bunnymen as influences and described their last album as "great late-night uneasy listening". In 1991, the band changed its name to Grant Lee Buffalo. Jeffrey Clark left the band and Kimble replaced Brenner on bass guitar.

The band's early influences included a mix of 1970s rock, folk, and country; however, Phillips' interest in American history, landscapes, and personal narratives shaped the band's lyrical direction.

During the 1990s, the band released four studio albums on Slash Records, achieved broader recognition with the debut-album titled single "Fuzzy". Grant Lee Buffalo disbanded in early 1999, but reunited for a limited series of live performances in the early 2010s.

== Career ==
In the 1990s, Grant Lee Buffalo released four albums, all of which were issued through Slash Records.

The single, "Truly, Truly", received extensive airplay on American radio. The full album, Jubilee, received positive critical responses, but comparatively limited airplay:

"The celebrational spirit of Jubilee actually brought a renewed optimism to me personally. The album was well received and understandably the expectations at the label were high, probably too high. Although the highly refined Jubilee had brought the band considerable success at radio with 'Truly, Truly,' a shift within the industry was well underway. The label's constant nagging about 'Call-out Response' was both a new term and a bewildering concept to our ears. The basic strategy: a radio station arranges to call up a listener who is asked to consume about 30 songs over the phone, perhaps 20 seconds of each. In this remote encounter, the listener will then proceed to judge the material. Poor call-out response was a big reason that Jubilee hardly got a shot at Warners. Grant Lee Buffalo tunes are often like an old car or an old amp that needs a few seconds to get warmed up, but when it does... look out! Meanwhile, a new crop of young record buyers, the largest since the Baby Boomer era, were now being targeted to the exclusion of Gen-Xers, like myself, still waiting for the Pixies to reform."

In 2001, a compilation of singles, album tracks, and rarities called Storm Hymnal was released.

== Sound and vision ==
Music critics have compared Grant Lee Buffalo's sound to that of Neil Young and John Stewart, particularly in discussions of the band's approach to Americana-influenced rock. Phillips writes that their first album "would galvanize the sound of Grant Lee Buffalo, i.e., the acoustic feedback howl of overdriven 12-string guitars, melodic distort-bass, tribal drum bombast, the old world churn of pump organs and parlor pianos."

Lyrically, the band frequently referenced American history as well as contemporary events. For instance, "Lone Star Song" from Mighty Joe Moon references the Waco siege and "Crackdown" from Copperopolis references the murder of Yoshihiro Hattori as well as the Oklahoma City bombing.

== Live ==
Following a 12-year hiatus, Grant Lee Buffalo reunited in May 2011 for a limited tour with stops in Los Angeles, Dublin, London, Brussels, Copenhagen, and Oslo. On August 8, 2011, the band performed at Dranouter Festival in Belgium, and on August 9 performed in Copenhagen. The band also played at the German Haldern Pop Festival in August 2012.

== Publication ==
In October 2017, Chrysalis Records acquired Grant Lee Buffalo's back catalog from Slash Records. Chrysalis/Blue Raincoat CEO Jeremy Lascelles had previously signed the band to the label's publisher in the 1990s.

== Solo careers ==
Phillips has had his own solo career, starting in 2000. He explains:

"As for Grant Lee Buffalo, I sensed they were beginning to wonder if we'd ever get through finishing school. Before that could happen, band and label parted as did Peters and myself. The scenery was changing and I was looking for new explorations. I'm sure we all were. Perhaps we always will be."

He was signed to the Boston-based indie label Rounder Records and launched a solo career, issuing Ladies' Love Oracle online in 2000. The recording was later more widely released. His first full-length album, Mobilize, was released in 2001. Phillips has released eleven albums between 2000 and 2022.

== Discography ==
=== Studio albums ===
List of studio albums, with selected details and chart positions
| Title | Album details | Peak chart positions | | | | | | |
| Title | Album details | UK | AUS | BEL | NOR | NZ | SWE | US Heat. |
|---|---|---|---|---|---|---|---|---|
| Fuzzy | Released: 23 February 1993; Label: Slash / London; Format: CD, LP, cassette, digital download | 74 | 164 | 157 | — | — | — | — |
| Mighty Joe Moon | Released: 20 September 1994; Label: Slash / London / Reprise / Liberation; Format: CD, LP, cassette, digital download | 24 | 48 | — | 8 | 23 | 38 | 16 |
| Copperopolis | Released: 4 June 1996; Label: Slash / London / Reprise; Format: CD, cassette, digital download | 34 | 59 | 43 | 9 | 28 | 27 | 16 |
| Jubilee | Released: 9 June 1998; Label: Slash / London / Polydor; Format: CD, cassette, digital download | — | 147 | — | — | — | — | 18 |

=== Singles ===
List of singles, with selected chart positions
| Title | Year | Peak chart positions | | | | Album |
| Title | Year | UK | AUS | NLD | US Mod. | Album |
|---|---|---|---|---|---|---|
| "Fuzzy" | 1993 | 83 | 182 | 42 | — | Fuzzy |
| "America Snoring" | 1993 | 82 | — | — | — | Fuzzy |
| "Jupiter and Teardrop" | 1993 | — | — | — | — | Fuzzy |
| "Lone Star Song" | 1994 | — | 101 | — | — | Mighty Joe Moon |
| "Mockingbirds" | 1994 | 86 | 115 | — | 14 | Mighty Joe Moon |
| "Honey Don't Think" | 1995 | — | | — | — | Mighty Joe Moon |
| "Homespun" | 1996 | 94 | 127 | — | — | Copperopolis |
| "Truly, Truly" | 1998 | — | — | — | 11 | Jubilee |

=== Music videos ===
| Year | Song / Video | Album | Director |
|---|---|---|---|
| 1993 | "Fuzzy" | Fuzzy | Carlos Grasso |
| 1993 | "America Snoring" | Fuzzy | Angus Cameron |
| 1994 | "Lone Star Song" | Mighty Joe Moon | Carlos Grasso |
| 1994 | "Mockingbirds" | Mighty Joe Moon | Anton Corbijn |
| 1994 | "Honey Don't Think" | Mighty Joe Moon | Carlos Grasso |
| 1994 | "El Dorado Motorhome" (Mighty Joe Moon Promo) | Mighty Joe Moon | Carlos Grasso |
| 1996 | "Homespun" | Copperopolis | Carlos Grasso |
| 1998 | "Testimony" | Jubilee | Jason Smith |
| 1999 | "Circuit DVD Music Magazine #1" (Jubilee Promo) | Jubilee | Jodi Wille |

=== Soundtracks ===
| OST release date / Episode air date | Song | Composer | Film / TV series |
|---|---|---|---|
| 22 March 1994 | "Fuzzy" | Grant-Lee Phillips | With Honors (OST) |
| 13 June 1995 | "Mockingbirds" | Grant-Lee Phillips | Mad Love (OST) |
| 26 September 1995 | "In My Room" | Brian Wilson, Gary Usher (The Beach Boys) | Friends (OST) |
| 3 November 1998 | "The Whole Shebang" "Bitter's End" (performed by Paul Kimble and Andy Mackay) "Living Proof"* "Lo' and Behold"* "Make Your Own Little Heaven"* | Grant-Lee Phillips Bryan Ferry (Roxy Music) Grant-Lee Phillips Grant-Lee Phillips Grant-Lee Phillips | Velvet Goldmine (OST) |
| 2 February 1999 | "Testimony" | Grant-Lee Phillips | I Still Know What You Did Last Summer (OST) |
| 9 April 2001 | "Jupiter and Teardrop" | Grant-Lee Phillips | Trigger Happy TV (OST to Series 2) |
| 19 April 2005 | "Happiness" | Grant-Lee Phillips | House TV Series (Babies & Bathwater episode) |

(*) – soundtrack demos only, not on the OST.

== See also ==
- If I Were a Carpenter
