= Fuzzy (album) =

Studio album by Grant Lee Buffalo
- Released: February 23, 1993
- Studios: Machine Elf (North Hollywood, California); Brilliant (San Francisco, California)
- Genres: Alternative country; gothic country
- Length: 48:31
- Label: Slash
- Producer: Paul Kimble

Grant Lee Buffalo chronology
| Fuzzy (1993) | Mighty Joe Moon (1994) |

Singles from Fuzzy
- 1. "Fuzzy" Released: 1993; 2. "America Snoring" Released: 1993; 3. "Jupiter and Teardrop" Released: 1993

Fuzzy is the debut studio album by American rock band Grant Lee Buffalo, released in 1993 by Slash Records. According to the band's website, "Fuzzy would galvanize the sound of Grant Lee Buffalo, i.e., the acoustic feedback howl of overdriven 12-string guitars, melodic distorto-bass, tribal drum bombast, the old world churn of pump organs and parlor pianos."

R.E.M.'s Michael Stipe praised Fuzzy as "the best album of the year hands down".

== Critical reception ==
Professional ratings
Review scores
| Source | Rating |
|---|---|
| AllMusic | 4.5/5 stars |
| Chicago Tribune | 3/4 stars |
| The Encyclopedia of Popular Music | 4/5 stars |
| NME | 8/10 |
| The Philadelphia Inquirer | 4/4 stars |
| Q | 4/5 stars |

The Indianapolis Star wrote that "Phillips is decidedly melancholy, be it with nice acoustic melodies ('The Hook') or ear-shredding guitar numbers ('Jupiter and Teardrop')." Music critic Dave Thompson called the record "[l]oose and evocative Americana" and said its "seemingly simple playing and production camouflag[e] dynamic strengths which trail from Neil Young to Jefferson Airplane, without ever once looking backwards".

== Track listing ==
All tracks are written by Grant Lee Phillips.

| No. | Title | Length |
|---|---|---|
| 1. | "The Shining Hour" | 3:53 |
| 2. | "Jupiter and Teardrop" | 5:57 |
| 3. | "Fuzzy" | 4:59 |
| 4. | "Wish You Well" | 3:30 |
| 5. | "The Hook" | 4:13 |
| 6. | "Soft Wolf Tread" | 2:52 |
| 7. | "Stars 'n' Stripes" | 4:43 |
| 8. | "Dixie Drug Store" | 5:07 |
| 9. | "America Snoring" | 3:39 |
| 10. | "Grace" | 6:15 |
| 11. | "You Just Have to Be Crazy" | 3:35 |

== Personnel ==
- Grant Lee Phillips – electric and acoustic guitars, vocals
- Paul Kimble – bass, vocals, piano, keyboards
- Joey Peters – drums, percussion

== Charts ==
Chart performance for Fuzzy
| Chart (1993) | Peak position |
|---|---|
| UK Albums (Official Charts) | 74 |

2023 chart performance for Fuzzy
| Chart (2023) | Peak position |
|---|---|
| Belgian Albums (Ultratop Flanders) | 157 |
