= Peter Wolf (disambiguation) =

Peter Wolf (born 1946) is an American musician, vocalist of The J. Geils Band.

Peter Wolf may also refer to:

- Peter Wolf (producer) (born 1952), Austrian keyboard player
- Peter M. Wolf (born 1935), American author, investment manager, and philanthropist
- Peter Wolf, who played for Austria national basketball team

== See also ==
- Peter Wolfe (disambiguation)
- Peter Wolff (disambiguation)
- Peter and the Wolf (disambiguation)
