= Beyond the Bloodhounds =

Studio album by Adia Victoria
- Released: May 13, 2016
- Genres: Swamp blues; folk; garage punk; gothic folk; punk blues; Southern Gothic
- Length: 43:33
- Label: Atlantic

Adia Victoria chronology
Beyond the Bloodhounds (2016)	Silences (2019)

Professional ratings
Aggregate scores
Source	Rating
Metacritic	82/100
Review scores
Source	Rating
AllMusic	4/5 stars
Flood Magazine	5/10

Beyond the Bloodhounds is the debut studio album by American singer-songwriter Adia Victoria. It was released in May 2016 under Atlantic Records.

== Track listing ==
No.	Title	Length
1.	"Lonely Avenue"	0:46
2.	"Dead Eyes"	2:21
3.	"Out of Love"	2:52
4.	"Mortimer's Blues"	4:17
5.	"Sea of Sand"	5:15
6.	"And Then You Die"	4:23
7.	"Howlin' Shame"	3:21
8.	"Horrible Weather"	4:00
9.	"Head Rot"	4:05
10.	"Invisible Hands"	4:29
11.	"Stuck in the South"	3:07
12.	"Mexico Blues"	4:37
