= Truly, Truly =

Single by Grant Lee Buffalo

from the album Jubilee
- Released: May 18, 1998
- Genre: Alternative rock; Americana
- Length: 3:58
- Label: Slash/Warner Bros.
- Songwriter(s): Grant-Lee Phillips
- Producer(s): Paul Fox

Grant Lee Buffalo singles chronology
| "Mr. Know It All" (1996) | "Truly, Truly" (1998) | "Testimony" (1998) |

"Truly, Truly" is a song by American rock band Grant Lee Buffalo. It was released in May 1998 as the lead single from their fourth album, Jubilee. Written by Grant-Lee Phillips and produced by Paul Fox, the single peaked at number 11 on the Billboard Modern Rock Tracks chart.

== Composition and recording ==
According to Grant Lee Buffalo drummer Joey Peters, he and Grant-Lee Phillips began work on "Truly, Truly" in 1996 while touring with The Smashing Pumpkins. As Phillips and Peters began demoing tracks for what would become the Jubilee album, bassist and producer Paul Kimble did not participate because, Peters recalled, "it was kind of obvious he was in a different space, musically and creatively". Kimble left the group the following year.

Phillips explained in a 1998 Musician magazine article that "Truly, Truly" began with a bass part. "And then it was a matter of setting that to a metronome and then filling in the chords around it — finding you could set majors or minors to whatever melody is being played in the bass."

The song's tone changes, Phillips said, have to do with running through different amplifiers, including a Marshall JCM900 and a Vox AC30. Phillips added, "The guitar part was played straight through, but we recorded all the amps on separate tracks, giving us up to four very distinct sounds to manipulate during the mix."

== Release ==
"Truly, Truly" was sent to modern rock, mainstream rock, and triple-A radio stations in May 1998. The song features on a promotional four-track extended play (EP) titled Yours Truly which Warner Bros. Records sent to commercial and college radio and press. The EP was also packaged with an issue of Alternative Press magazine. A three-track cassette tape featuring "Truly, Truly" was made available during a club tour prior to the album release.

== Credits and personnel ==
Credits adapted from liner notes and Discogs.

Locations

- Recorded at A&M Studios in Hollywood, California
- Mixed at South Beach Studios in Miami Beach, Florida
- Mastering at Precision Mastering in Los Angeles, California

Personnel

- Grant Lee Phillips – vocals, guitar
- Joey Peters – drums, tambourine, shaker
- Dan Rothchild – bass
- Rami Jaffee – organ
- Andrew Williams – additional vocals

== Chart positions ==
| Chart (1998) | Peak position |
|---|---|
| US Alternative Airplay (Billboard) | 11 |
