= Silences =

Studio album by Adia Victoria
- Released: February 22, 2019
- Studio: Long Pond Studios, New York, USA
- Genre: Blues; indie rock; Southern gothic
- Length: 42:13
- Label: Atlantic
- Producer: Aaron Dessner

Adia Victoria chronology
| Beyond the Bloodhounds (2016) | Silences (2019) | A Southern Gothic (2021) |

Professional ratings
Aggregate scores
| Source | Rating |
|---|---|
| Metacritic | 85/100 |
Review scores
| Source | Rating |
| AllMusic | 4/5 stars |
| DIY Mag | 4/5 stars |
| Pitchfork | 7.7/10 |
| PopMatters | 9/10 |

Silences is the second studio album by American singer-songwriter Adia Victoria and co-produced by Aaron Dessner. It was released in February 2019 under Atlantic Records.

== Track listing ==
| No. | Title | Length |
|---|---|---|
| 1. | "Clean" | 1:53 |
| 2. | "Bring Her Back" | 3:15 |
| 3. | "Pacolet Road" | 3:08 |
| 4. | "The City" | 3:18 |
| 5. | "Different Kind of Love" | 3:24 |
| 6. | "Devil Is a Lie" | 4:28 |
| 7. | "The Needle's Eye" | 3:33 |
| 8. | "Cry Wolf" | 4:16 |
| 9. | "Heathen" | 3:25 |
| 10. | "Nice Folks" | 4:11 |
| 11. | "Dope Queen Blues" | 3:06 |
| 12. | "Get Lonely" | 4:18 |
