= Jay Munly =

American musician

Munly J. Munly
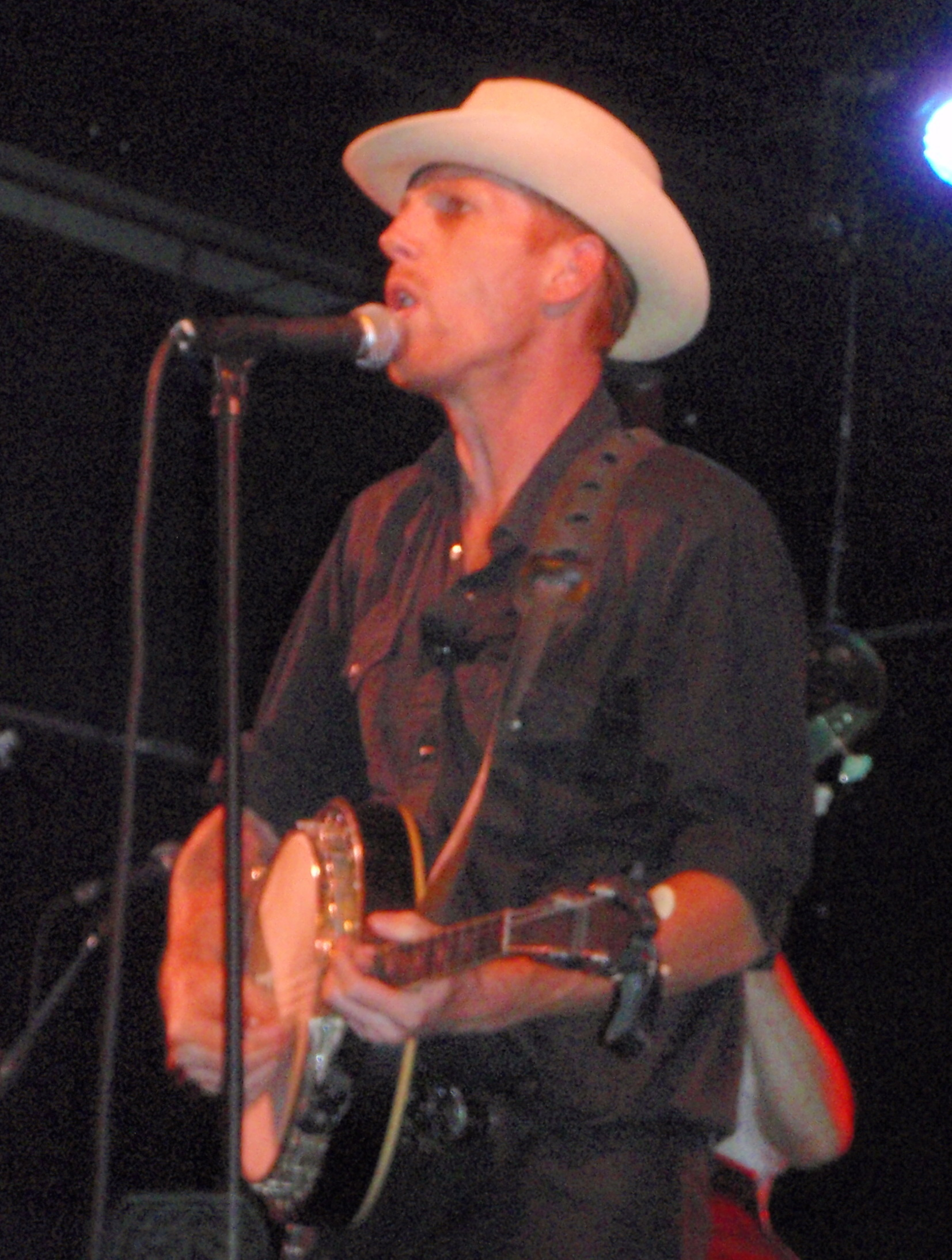
- Munly performing with Slim Cessna's Auto Club at Lee's Palace in Toronto in 2009

Background information
- Also known as: Munly; Munly Munly (Note: Munly Munly is his primary name when working as part of Slim Cessna's Auto Club and Denver Broncos UK (DBUK).); Jay Munly
- Origin: Denver, Colorado, U.S.
- Genres: Gothic country; alternative country
- Occupations: Singer; songwriter; musician; author
- Instruments: Vocals; banjo; guitar
- Years active: 1995–present
- Labels: SCAC Unincorporated; Glitterhouse; Smooch (former); Alternative Tentacles (former); W.A.R.? (former); Pesanta Urfolk (former)

Jayson Thompson, who goes by the stage name Jay Munly or Munly, is an American singer, songwriter and musician based in Denver, Colorado. He is known for his role in the development of the Denver Sound, which is music that mixes elements of country, gothic, folk and gospel native to that city. He is a member of Slim Cessna's Auto Club, Munly and the Lupercalians, and The Denver Broncos UK (DBUK). He was a founding member of Munly and the Lee Lewis Harlots, active from 2000 to 2007. He was also a member of The Road Home in 2015.

== Early life ==
Munly was born to Ohio natives Bruce A. Thompson and Geraldine Ann Manley. His father was an exploration geologist and the founder of Skull Creek Oil. He describes his childhood as being raised in a "stereotypical Catholic" upper-middle class household. He spent parts of his childhood in Quebec, Canada, Colorado, and Ohio. His family had summer retreats in Ellsworth, Ohio. He also played ice hockey.

Munly's interest in music began in childhood, while he was recovering from an ice hockey injury. He also had some familial ties: his father and grandfather owned and played banjos, and his father also made a dulcimer for his mother as a gift, although she did not play it. While recuperating from said injury, Munly taught himself how to play his father's 19th century-era banjo, which was technically off-limits to handle, although his mother knew what was going on. She eventually bought him a guitar which he taught himself to play as well. He played both instruments in the same fashion and only played his own songs.

When he was older, presumably in his 20s, he moved to Boulder, Colorado before eventually moving to Denver. In a 2009 interview, he said that he identifies more with being an American from Denver than with being a Canadian from Quebec. Prior to becoming a musician, it has been rumored that Munly worked as a summer camp counselor and as a record store clerk. According to an interview with good friend Andrew Murphy of Smooch Records, he may have worked at "Albums on the Hill" in Boulder, Colorado, since that is where Murphy and Munly first met and where Munly helped him get a job.

In the late 1990s, he attended Columbia University in Manhattan, New York, where he earned a Master's degree in Modern English Literature.

== Solo career ==
Munly started out his music career in the 1990s. He had toured with The Reejers before releasing his first album. He also shared a 7-inch vinyl album with Roger Manning, though the song featured on the record is unknown. However, he does appear on a 1998 cassette by Joe Folk & the Soho Valley Boys, a Manning side-project, titled "Chyeah". He performed a spoken-word piece on Side 2, Track 11: "Bohemia Blues/ Poetic Hwy Vision #63/ Starry Eyed Blues".

He has worked with several musicians that are featured on his albums, such as John Ellison of The Reejers and Chris Mars of The Replacements. However, he makes a point of not listing the exact musical contributions of each member in liner notes, preferring the simplicity of the 'Modern Library book' aesthetic.

Although Munly is the primary vocalist and lyricist on each of his albums, he hesitated to call himself a "singer-songwriter":

"It's kind of rough being a solo artist. [...] If you're a male and you're from Boulder and you have a guitar, people automatically want to compare you to all that singer-songwriter crap. The papers are like, `Hmmm, the guy warming up? Let's see. He's a solo guitarist, so let's call him singer-songwriter Munly.' Until they actually hear me, that is."

— Interview with Westword (1995)

He was signed to What Are Records? and released his debut solo album, Blurry, in 1996 through Top Notch, an imprint of W.A.R. Munly de Dar He and Galvanized Yankee were also released through Top Notch in 1997 and 1999, respectively. His fourth and final solo album, Jimmy Carter Syndrome, was released through Smooch Records in 2002.

=== Blurry ===
Blurry is Munly's debut studio album. It was released through Top Notch, an imprint of W.A.R., on February 6, 1996. It is the only album of his which incorporates elements of pop music rather than the sounds and lyrics of gothic country that he is mainly known for.

The album was originally titled "Blurry Polaroids", but Munly was forced to shorten the name by the Polaroid Corporation.

John Ellison, Rob Dread, and Craig Winzelberg performed on this album. Munly provided vocals and guitar and Ellison performed on bass. The exact contributions of Dread and Winzelberg are unknown.

The album was re-mastered by producer Bob Ferbrache at Absinthe Studios in Denver. It was given a limited-edition re-release, with new cover art and an updated track listing, through Smooch Records on June 27, 2006. Only 1,000 copies were printed due to "licensing restrictions."

Little is known about how the album was received by critics. However, there were apparently a few songs that reached popularity in Perth, Australia.

The first track, "Virgin of Manhattan", was used during a sex scene on an episode of the television series Melrose Place.

The second track, "Baptists & Barbiturates", was featured on a 1996 compilation album titled More Than Mountains: A Benefit For Colorado Conservation, released by W.A.R.

=== Munly de Dar He ===
Munly de Dar He (or de Dar He) is his second studio album, released on November 15, 1997. It was distributed through Top Notch Records, an imprint of W.A.R. Musically, this album features a more robust instrumental backing than his previous effort, Blurry. A variety of instruments are used: strings such as the banjo, cello, and violin, horns such as the tuba and trumpet, as well as others, such as the accordion and various forms of percussion.

Munly collaborated with musicians Nick Urata (of later DeVotchKa fame), Matthew Brown, Michael Crow, Tom Echols, and Channing Lewis to form the 'de Dar He' band. However, the exact contributions of each member are unknown. The album was recorded "in an abandoned semi-trailer" in Denver, Colorado.

Following a move from Denver, Colorado to Austin, Texas in 1997, the band appeared on the MTV sitcom "Austin Stories". Members Crow and Lewis quit shortly thereafter, leading the band to split up permanently.

The album was re-mastered by Bob Ferbrache at Absinthe Studios in Denver. It was given a limited-edition re-release through Smooch Records on July 18, 2006. Only 1,000 copies were printed due to "licensing restrictions."

Little is known about how the album was received by critics. However, in 1998, Michael Roberts of Westword rated the album as one of the best to be released by Colorado locals in 1997:

"The previous offering by singer-songwriter Jayson Munly Thompson, who recently moved from Colorado to Austin, was a solo disc, the wonderfully odd Blurry. This time around, he's part of a full-sized band that adds heft to his tunes without muting his idiosyncracies. The music has a roots feel that occasionally recalls 16 Horsepower; it's simple yet varied, tuneful yet moody. But Munly's unhinged vocals and lyrics epitomized by song titles such as 'Seven Warts on Pa's Belly' give it personality. Weird never sounded so good."

=== Galvanized Yankee ===
Galvanized Yankee is Munly's third studio album, released on January 5, 1999. It was distributed by Top Notch Records, an imprint of W.A.R. This is the first album that leans into the gothic country genre that he is known for. Reviewer Jeremy Salmon of AllMusic looks at the album as a "compendium of tales" – a concept album loosely held together by the theme of war. In fact, the album title "Galvanized Yankee" is a historical term that dates to the American Civil War era. (Munly, with his father, shared an interest in this period of American history, which may have heavily influenced this album.) Many of the songs deal with life, death, and religion and are laden with images of "desolate farmlands, of Hollywood ghost towns, of deserted battlefields, filled with corpses and the detritus of war."

The album mostly contains covers of traditional American songs, many from the Civil War era. It also contains a live version of "Virgin of Manhattan" featuring actor Patrick Stewart and a recorded radio advertisement for "Math Made Easy", a math tutoring program for children.

The album was recorded in New York, between 1998 and 1999, while Munly was attending Columbia University. Performance credits include: W.H. Auden, William Bowen, Monica Dreidemie, Dan Joeright, Joseph Lesage, M. Outland, Patrick Stewart, and Rob Wilson. The guitar, mandolin, and fiddle are the most prominent instruments on the album.

The album was re-mastered by Bob Ferbrache and re-released by Smooch Records on February 13, 2007.

=== Jimmy Carter Syndrome ===
Jimmy Carter Syndrome is Munly's fourth and final solo studio album, released in 2002. This was the first album to be distributed through Smooch Records.

He asserts that prizefighter Gerry Cooney was his babysitter as a child. The song "Cooney vs. Munly" on Jimmy Carter Syndrome (2002) was written as a tribute to him. In fact, the Jimmy Carter Syndrome album may have been named as such (in part) due to the way both he and former U.S. president Jimmy Carter were brought up: "We grew up similarly...he had a nanny who sort of raised him. I was in that situation, more than my parents raising me. So there are some similarities."

The song "Spill the Wine" was featured on Tyr: Myth-Culture-Tradition, Vol. 2 in 2004.

== Bands ==
=== Slim Cessna's Auto Club ===
Munly joined Slim Cessna's Auto Club in 1998, around the same time as Lord Dwight Pentecost, after being friends with Slim Cessna for a few years. This was during the time that Munly was recording Galvanized Yankee in New York. Part of the reason he agreed to join was that he liked how the band was operated by existing members. Since then, he has been the band's primary songwriter and shares frontman/vocalist duties with Cessna. Always Say Please and Thank You (2000) is the first SCAC album that Munly appears on.

The satirical song "SCAC 101" on Cipher (2008) alludes to how Munly came to join the band.

Munly and Slim Cessna were featured in a segment of "Seven Signs: Music, Myth, and the American South" (2008), a film by JD Wilkes of Th' Legendary Shack Shakers. Munly recited the original story titled "Döder Made Me Do It" and joined Slim in performing "Children of the Lord" by Slim Cessna's Auto Club.

=== Munly and The Lee Lewis Harlots ===
'Munly and the Lee Lewis Harlots' was a six-piece gothic country band with mostly stringed instruments. According to a Munly fansite, the band was active between 2000 and 2006. However, there are concert videos on YouTube that were recorded in February 2007. They also made an appearance at Westword's Denver Music Showcase in June 2007.

Besides Munly (vocals, banjo, guitar), the original 'Lee Lewis Harlots' were: Elin Palmer (violin, nyckelharpa, string arrangements), Frieda Stalheim (violin), and Rebecca Vera (cello). Paul Bradley (upright bass), and Jeff Linsenmaier (drums) were later additions. Jay Shewman replaced Paul Bradley on bass some time in 2007. Some members have also contributed backing vocals.

According to the band's former MySpace page, Munly and Vera met Palmer in 2000, on the set of the "Clogger" music video by 16 Horsepower. Palmer brought in violinist Stalheim, her best friend at the time, then brought in drummer Linsenmaier after meeting him on a European tour with 16 Horsepower and The Czars. Bassist Bradley randomly showed up to a practice with his instrument, ready to play.

In July 2006, Munly and the Lee Lewis Harlots was voted the best band in Colorado by over 100 music experts in the Denver Post Underground Music Poll.

Their only album, Munly & The Lee Lewis Harlots, has received much critical acclaim. The original album was initially released in August 2004 through Alternative Tentacles. A combined CD/DVD double-album was released in October 2004 as a joint release between Alternative Tentacles and Smooch Records. It came with additional features such as: the original album in surround sound, three additional bonus tracks, lyrics read by Munly, and photos of the band. Of the three bonus tracks, only one is a previously unreleased Harlots track: "Rufus Wainwright, I'm Coming After You". The album was re-released on vinyl in August 2013 through the label Pesanta Urfolk. It contained a booklet of lyrics and updated cover art by Benjamin A. Vierling.

They recorded a version of "Everyone Is Guilty #2" for the Smooch Records compilation album, Crossbreeding Begins At Home (2004). It would later become an 'Auto Club' song, released on Cipher in 2008.

"Amen Corner", from their self-titled record, was featured on another Smooch Records compilation, Radio 1190: Local Shakedown, Vol. 2 (2004), and "Old Service Road" was featured on the Alternative Tentacles compilation album, Sonic Terror Surge 2007.

=== Munly and The Lupercalians ===
'Munly and the Lupercalians' is Munly's second side project, which was started around 2006–2007. The original lineup of the band included many, if not all, members of the Lee Lewis Harlots. The current lineup contains most of the current members of Slim Cessna's Auto Club: Munly, Slim Cessna, Lord Dwight Pentecost, Rebecca Vera, and Andrew Warner. On stage, each band member, except for Munly, wears a costume that identifies them as a member of the fictional town of 'Lupercalia.'

The goal is to produce a multi-album set tentatively titled The Kinnery Of Lupercalia, which is all about the town and its colorful residents. Its residents have been described as "families who interact with each other" and Lupercalia as an "imagined community of Legions & clans where we are not sure who is a deity and who is not."

Although an unauthorized demo album was released in 2009, the first official album by the band, Petr & the Wulf, was released in October 2010 through Alternative Tentacles. It was re-released through their own independent record label, SCAC Unincorporated, around 2015. The work is loosely based on the Peter and the Wolf composition by Sergei Prokofiev, and is said to be a prequel to the stories of Lupercalia told over a span of four albums.

The song "Grandfather" was featured on the Smooch Records compilation album Radio 1190: Local Shakedown, Vol. 3 (2009) and on Rodentagogue: The Best of Dark Roots Music Volume II, released by Devil's Ruin Music in 2010.

In September 2019, BandWagon Magazine reported that the Lupercalians were recording a new album, although most of it was actually already written in 2012, perhaps earlier. According to an interview with the Denver Post, 36 songs were written as of 2006.

In February 2020, Westword announced that the new album would be titled Kinnery of Lupercalia: Undelivered Legion and would be released in the latter half of 2020, most likely through SCAC Unincorporated Records, although the release date was delayed due to the COVID-19 pandemic.

On March 24, 2022, the band posted the vinyl album cover art for Kinnery of Lupercalia: Undelivered Legion and announced that it would be available to pre-order until the official release date of May 13, 2022. The first single, "Ahmen", was released on March 21, 2022.

The band also stated that this would be the only KOL album recorded by them; the other two will be recorded and released by Slim Cessna's Auto Club and DBUK. On May 24, 2024, Slim Cessna's Auto Club released Kinnery of Lupercalia: Buell Legion.

=== Denver Broncos UK ===
The Denver Broncos UK is an experimental folk quartet that began touring together in 2012. They are now commonly referred to as DBUK in order to dispel any notion that they are connected to the Denver Broncos football team or the Bronco's fanbase in the United Kingdom.

The band formed in 2006 with just Munly, Lord Dwight Pentecost, and Slim Cessna; Rebecca Vera joined later on. All members contribute vocals and all members except Munly play some sort of percussion. In addition, Munly plays the guitar, Rebecca plays the cello and keys, and Dwight plays autoharp, melodica, and banjo.

Their debut full-length album, Songs One Through Eight was released in March 2015 by their own label, SCACUNINCORPORATED. A few songs that appear on the album are original recordings from 2006 and 2007, which do not include Rebecca. Songs Nine Through Sixteen was released in October 2019, also on their own record label. A double-album titled Songs One Through Sixteen was released in November 2018 through the European record label Glitterhouse Records.

Their cover of "Top Yourself" by The Raconteurs is included on the album Rockin' Legends Pay Tribute to Jack White, released in November 2013.

In December 2020, DBUK covered "The Safety Dance" by Men Without Hats for Wheelerfest 2020, a two-day virtual musical event which hosted by musician Sean Wheeler and broadcast from Mexico City, Mexico. Each band created one or more videos to contribute with a "freak show" theme. In DBUK's video, Munly sat outside on a chair, wearing a black hat, clothing, and a non-surgical cloth mask. He held a "dummy" baby doll in his arms and manually moved the doll's mouth to the lyrics. There were computerized graphics interspersed between. An official recording of the song has not been released.

=== The Road Home ===
Munly joined "Scott Kelly and The Road Home" in 2015, a side project formed by Scott Kelly and Noah Landis of Neurosis. The band was renamed "The Road Home" after Greg Dale's departure.

He performed a small number of shows in the west and southwest parts of the United States in January and February 2015, which included California, Arizona, Nevada, Utah, Idaho, Washington, and Oregon. He contributed vocals and autoharp to live performances.

He recorded only one song with The Road Home, which was the single "The Forgiven Ghost in Me."

=== Other collaborations ===
He has also been included on a few compilation albums. One of his first songs, "tY" appeared on a compilation album of Colorado artists in 1995, titled Shmowballs, released through the record label Sh-mow.

W.A.R. Records released the album More Than Mountains: A Benefit For Colorado Conservation in September 1996, where Munly made two appearances – one as a member of Slim Cessna's Auto Club, and the other with The Winebottles, on the track "Sasquatch".

In 2000, Smooch Records released Radio 1190: Local Shakedown, Vol. 1, which featured his live version of the poem/rhyme "The Gashlycrumb Tinies" by Edward Gorey set to music. It was also on Crossbreeding Begins at Home, another Smooch Records compilation album, which received a limited release of 200 copies in January 2004.

== Other ventures ==
=== Writing ===
Besides being the primary songwriter in all of his bands, he is also an accomplished author and playwright.

Munly's most recent publication is a collection of short stories titled "Confessions to Scare...". Each story in the collection is given by a member of the fictional town of Lupercalia. Two editions have been released. The first edition, limited to 200 printed copies and only released in the United States, was published by Devil's Jump Press in August 2021. The second edition, expanded to 1,000 printed copies and released worldwide, was published by SCACUNINCWORDS in December 2021. SCACUNINCWORDS is a publishing house formed by the SCACUNINCORPORATED record label, in partnership with Devil's Jump Press.

His first book, "Ten Songs With No Music", was released in 2001 by Maude O.K. Publishing. It is currently out of print. Running 213 pages in length, it is a collection of stories based on characters featured in some of his songs. Each chapter shares a title with a song from either Munly's solo efforts or from "Always Say Please and Thank You" by Slim Cessna's Auto Club.

One of those stories, "Cattle, I Will Hang" was made into a short black-and-white film, directed and produced by Munly with Rebecca Vera. It is the story of which the song on Jimmy Carter Syndrome is based and runs approximately 36 minutes in length. Munly narrates and voices all four characters in the story, while making a few in-person appearances as well.

According to one fan on the website guestbook of Slim Cessna's Auto Club, another one of Munly's books may be titled "Life on a Limb". The comment was made in 2004, and although no other information can be found regarding the title, Munly confirmed that he was in the midst of writing a second book in an interview with Kaffeine Buzz in 2005.

In a 1995 interview with Westword, Munly said that he also wrote some children's stories that had been published.

In 2006, he was asked to contribute to the Copper Nickel literary magazine of the University of Colorado in Denver. His story was titled "A Re-Birth Certificate."

Munly has also written some plays for which he has won the Southern Heritage and Young North American Playwright awards. Two of them reportedly have been in production.

=== Acting ===
Munly went to college to pursue an acting degree for one semester before transferring to Columbia University. During that time, he had done some voice work and appeared in a commercial for a hot dog brand. According to his profile on ACX, he has been in a variety of small productions onstage and in film.

In 2000, he appeared in the music video for "Clogger" by 16 Horsepower as "The Clogger" himself, clogging (or clog dancing) on stage. Former 'Harlots' Elin Palmer and Rebecca Vera also appear in the video, as does former 'Auto Club' member Bob Ferbrache. Vera and Ferbrache are seen in the audience, while Palmer plays the xylophone on stage with the band.

In 2012, Munly was personally contacted by Shooter Jennings to participate in his short film, The Other Life, directed by Blake Judd in Kentucky. He appears as a mortician. He also narrates the beginning of Jennings' music video for "Gunslinger" off of the album "The Other Life".

== Artistry ==
=== Songwriting ===
Munly is the chief songwriter for both his solo endeavors and side projects. It is a role that he is happy to take on by himself, believing that a band's success is dependent on playing to individual strengths rather than collaboration with members on each part of an album's creation. He also says that he is "selfish" with his written material and serious about lyrical preservation.

He expanded on his way of songwriting in a 2019 interview with Sadwave, a Russian publication:

"From the very beginning, I understand where and why I'm writing a song. There is no complicated science. When you have been doing this for so many years, you bring the skill to automatism. I can start with a melody, but I can with a text – I always have a lot of words, I write a lot. I constantly find common themes in my songs, but I never had the feeling that I was working on a pattern. It would be immoral and unnatural, and I would not want to. I have characters who constantly come back, wander from song to song. But I try to change the angle, write on behalf of different people. On behalf of all sad people."

=== Musical style ===
His music has ties to alt-country and Gothic-Americana. Common themes include religion, violence and dysfunctional relationships; often they are intertwined. His increasingly narrative songs often feature banjo and, since the recording of his fourth album, Jimmy Carter Syndrome, strings.

One topic that Munly deliberately does not write about is politics, since he "hates" music that veers into that kind of territory. However, he admits that the stories and songs that he writes can be applied to real-world events in a way that coincidentally fits.

=== Vocals ===
Technically, Munly is a baritone, but his vocal range extends from A1 to F5. Audio samples can be found on YouTube.

Early on in his solo career, he sang at a higher register than what is typically heard on his later records.

On the expanded DVDs of Munly & The Lee Lewis Harlots (2004) and The Commandments According to SCAC (2016), Munly read the lyrics of each song as poetry, employing a wide range of voices to the characters in his songs.

== Personal life ==
Munly has a sister and two brothers.

Munly has been in a long-term relationship with musician Rebecca Vera since 2004. Vera is active in Munly's solo and band projects as both a backup vocalist and musician. They live in Denver.

Following in his father's footsteps, Munly is a Freemason of the thirty-second degree.

== Discography ==
Solo albums

- Blurry (1996)
- Munly de Dar He (1997)
- Galvanized Yankee (1999)
- Jimmy Carter Syndrome (2002)
- There Is No Road Home (2023)

as Munly and the Lee Lewis Harlots

- Munly & The Lee Lewis Harlots (2004)

as Munly and the Lupercalians

- Petr & the Wulf (2010)
- Kinnery of Lupercalia: Undelivered Legion (2022)

with Denver Broncos UK (DBUK)

- Songs One Through Eight (2015)
- Songs One Through Sixteen (2018)
- Songs Nine Through Sixteen (2019)

with The Road Home

- "The Forgiven Ghost In Me" (2015)
