= Adia Victoria =

American singer and songwriter (born 1986)

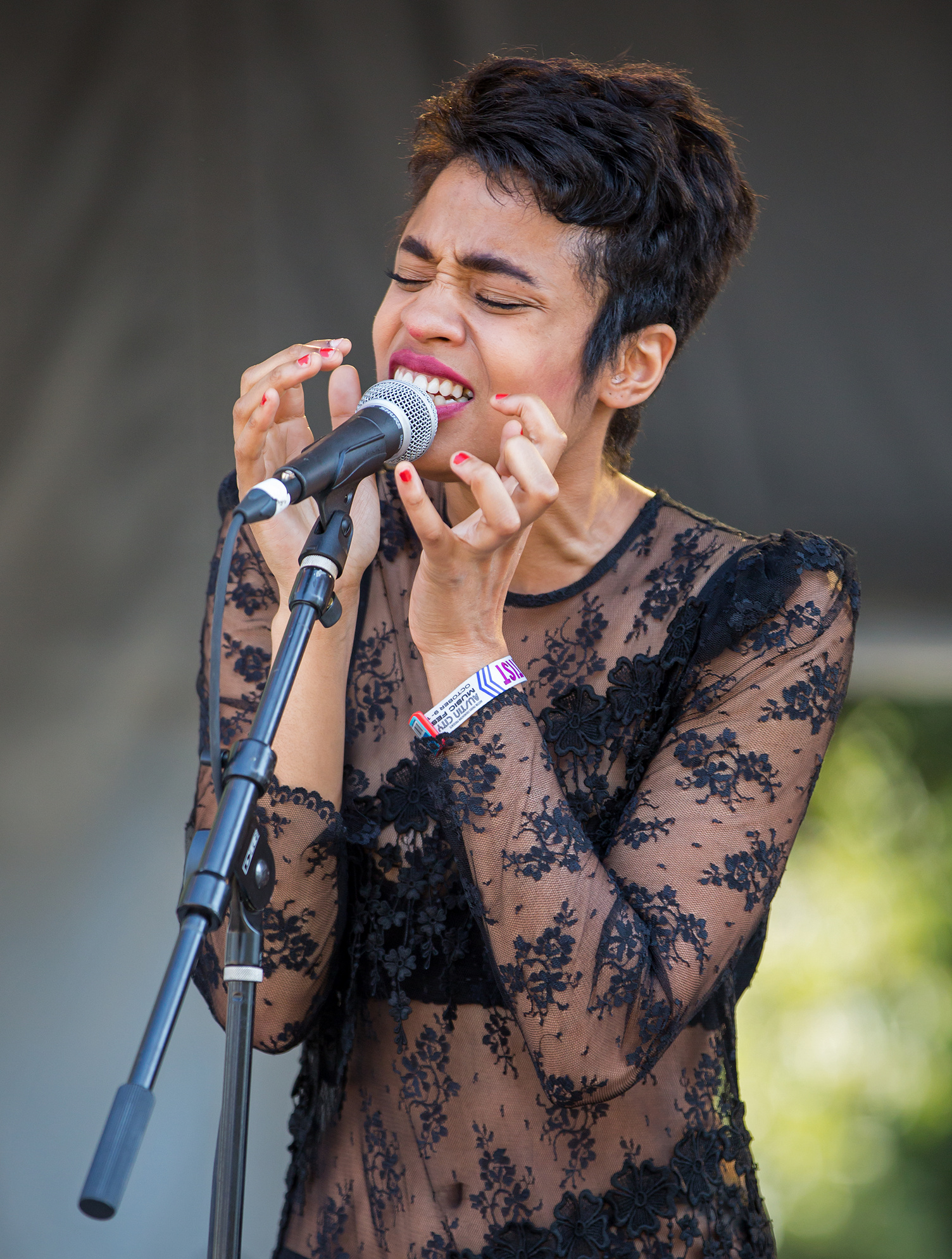
- Adia Victoria performing at Austin City Limits Music Festival in 2015

Background information
- Born: July 22, 1986 (age 40); Spartanburg, South Carolina, US
- Origin: Nashville, Tennessee, US
- Genres: Blues rock; gothic country
- Years active: 2013–present
- Label: Warner
- Website: adiavictoria.com

Adia Victoria (born July 22, 1986) is an American singer and songwriter. In addition to playing and writing music, she writes poetry. She is currently based in Nashville.

== Musical style ==
Victoria has described her music as "gothic blues". It incorporates elements of rock, blues, punk rock and country music. Critics and journalists have classified her style as blues, folk, Southern Gothic, indie rock, blues rock, gothic country, gothic folk, swamp blues, garage punk, punk blues and soul music. Although Victoria is sometimes associated with Americana music, she has distanced herself from the genre, saying, "I’m not an Americana artist. I have no interest in being appropriated by that genre." However, her position seems to have softened as, in 2022, she performed at a nominations event hosted by the Americana Music Association and was nominated for their Emerging Artist of the Year award at their 21st awards ceremony.

== Biography ==
Adia Victoria was born in Spartanburg, South Carolina and is one of six siblings. Her father is Trinidadian. She was raised as a Seventh-day Adventist and she attended church schools until in the 6th grade, her mother enrolled her in public school. Shortly after, her parents divorced and Victoria began to write poetry and short stories as a means of coping. Being moved from the world of Seventh-day Adventists to a public school was difficult for Victoria, who didn't feel she fit in. Victoria and her siblings often spent time with her maternal grandparents who lived near Campobello. She attended Landrum Junior High School in Campobello. Her family also left the Adventist church before Victoria attended high school, which allowed her to explore music she hadn't been exposed to before, like Kurt Cobain, Miles Davis and Fiona Apple.

After high school, she went to New York for a time, in an attempt to "strike it big in a new city." In 2007, she left New York for Atlanta. On her 21st birthday, a friend gave her a guitar and she began to work with blues music. Victoria moved to Nashville in 2010. She chose Nashville as a place where she could live anonymously. In Nashville, she earned her GED and then took French in college. She began to perform around Nashville. In 2016, she performed at South by Southwest.

Her personal "look" was noticed by Vogue for its "Afropunk" roots. However, Victoria states that she doesn't like to be "fetishized" for her looks, saying, "People think that because you are attractive, you owe the world something, to let them consume you."

== Work ==
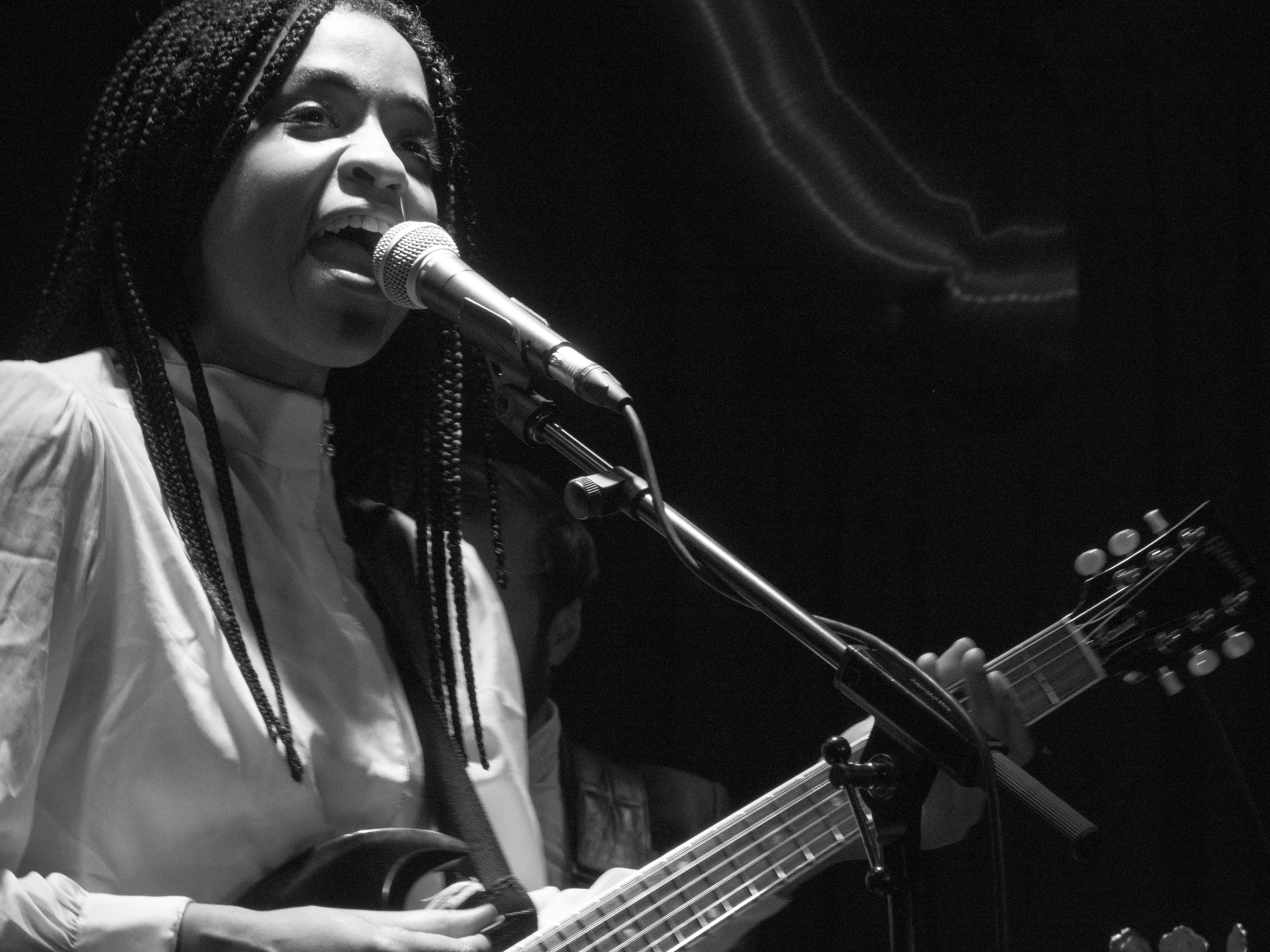
Adia Victoria at Privatclub, Berlin

Victoria began her career with a backing band consisting of Ruby Rogers, Tiffany Minton, and Mason Hickman. In 2016, she began working with a different group that included Minton, Hickman, Alex Caress, Jason Harris, and Peter Eddins.

Victoria's first single release was "Stuck In the South", which was described on All Things Considered as a "very swampy mysterious kind of slow-burning song." Rolling Stone describes her as "PJ Harvey covering Loretta Lynn at a haunted debutante ball." Her live performances are described by Wondering Sound as angry and "furious and feral." American Songwriter calls her stage presence "commanding."

Victoria's full-length debut, Beyond the Bloodhounds, was produced by Roger Moutenot, The name of the album is a reference to Incidents in the Life of a Slave Girl by Harriet Jacobs. The predominant theme of her first album is dealing with life in her twenties. Moutenot has previously collaborated with Yo La Tengo and also produced her first single. Canvasback is her current record label. Her 2019 album, Silences, was co-produced by Aaron Dessner from The National. In 2020 Victoria released the song "South Gotta Change", executive produced by T Bone Burnett.

In August 2021, Victoria released "Magnolia Blues" as the lead single from her upcoming third studio album, A Southern Gothic. Jon Freeman of Rolling Stone described the song as "an eerie, acoustic-guitar-driven tune that expands to thick bass and a ghostly orchestra of strings and banjo." A Southern Gothic was released on September 17, 2021.

== Discography ==
=== Studio albums ===
- Beyond the Bloodhounds (2016)
- Silences (2019)
- A Southern Gothic (2021)

=== EPs ===
- Sea of Sand EP (2014)
- How It Feels EP (2017)
- Baby Blues EP (2017)

=== Singles ===
- "Lonely Avenue"
- "Dead Eyes" (Released as single)
- "Out Of Love"
- "Mortimer’s Blues"
- "Sea Of Sand" (Released as single)
- "And Then You Die"
- "Howlin’ Shame" (Released as single)
- "Horrible Weather"
- "Head Rot"
- "Invisible Hands"
- "Stuck in the South" (Released as single)
- "Mexico Blues"
- "Different Kind of Love" (2019) – No. 15 Adult Alternative Songs
- "South Gotta Change" (2020)
- "Magnolia Blues" (2021)
- "Ain't Killed Me Yet" (2022)

=== Compilation tracks ===
- "La pour ça" Standing At The Gates, The Songs of Nada Surf's Let Go
- "Backwards Blues" 30 Days, 30 Songs (Now called 1,000 Days 1,000 Songs) Day 10, Song 11
- "7th Amendment (Caravan)" 27 The Most Perfect Album
- "Detroit Moan" An exclusive unreleased Victoria Spivey cover posted on Rookiemag.com in 2016. Link was still valid in 2019.
