= Jubilee (Grant Lee Buffalo album) =

Studio album by Grant Lee Buffalo
- Released: June 9, 1998
- Genre: Rock
- Label: Warner Bros. Records
- Producer: Paul Fox

Grant Lee Buffalo chronology
Copperopolis (1996)	Jubilee (1998)

Professional ratings
Review scores
Source	Rating
AllMusic	4/5 stars
The Austin Chronicle	3/4 stars
The Encyclopedia of Popular Music	3/5 stars
Entertainment Weekly	B+

Jubilee is the fourth and final studio album by Grant Lee Buffalo, released in 1998. The single "Truly, Truly" received significant radio airplay, appearing on Billboard's Modern Rock chart for 13 weeks, peaking at #11.

According to Grant Lee Phillips, the album may have suffered from high expectations at the label.

"The celebrational spirit of Jubilee actually brought a renewed optimism to me personally. The album was well received and understandably the expectations at the label were high, probably too high. Although the highly refined Jubilee had brought the band considerable success at radio with "Truly, Truly", a shift within the industry was well underway. The label's constant nagging about "Call-out Response" was both a new term and a bewildering concept to our ears. The basic strategy: a radio station arranges to call up a listener who is asked to consume about 30 songs over the phone, perhaps 20 seconds of each. From this remote encounter, the listener will then proceed to judge the material. Insufficient call-out response was a big reason that Jubilee hardly got a shot at Warners. Grant Lee Buffalo tunes are often like an old car or an old amp that needs a few seconds to get warmed up, but when it does... look out! Meanwhile, a new crop of young record buyers, the largest since the Baby Boomer era, were now being targeted to the exclusion of Gen-Xers, like myself, still waiting for the Pixies to reform."

The album is the last recorded by the band, though Phillips has released a number of solo albums.

"As for Grant Lee Buffalo, I sensed they were beginning to wonder if we'd ever get through finishing school. Before that could happen, band and label parted as did Peters and myself. The scenery was changing and I was looking for new explorations. I'm sure we all were. Perhaps we always will be."

== Critical reception ==
The Washington Post called the album "glam-rock with barely a hint of alt-country." The Chicago Tribune wrote that it "starts slowly, only to reveal kaleidoscopic songwriting colors that suggest the ambition of late-period Beatles."

== Track listing ==
1. "APB" - 3:37
2. "Seconds" - 4:21
3. "Change Your Tune" - 3:21
4. "Testimony" - 3:59
5. "Truly, Truly" - 3:58
6. "SuperSloMotion" - 5:42
7. "Fine How'd Ya Do" - 3:52
8. "Come to Mama, She Say" - 4:31
9. "8 Mile Road" - 4:55
10. "Everybody Needs a Little Sanctuary" - 4:01
11. "My My My" - 4:05
12. "Crooked Dice" - 4:43
13. "Jubilee" - 3:38
14. "The Shallow End" - 4:16

== Personnel ==
- Grant Lee Phillips - vocals, guitars, mellotron, celeste
- Joey Peters - drums, sleigh bells
- Dan Rothchild - bass, additional vocals
- Jon Brion - piano, vibraphone
- Greg Leisz - pedal steel
- Rami Jaffee - B3 organ
- Phil Parlapiano - accordion on "Everybody Needs a Little Sanctuary"
- Robyn Hitchcock - harmonica on "My, My, My", additional vocals on "My, My, My" and "The Shallow End"
- Andrew Williams - additional vocals on "Truly, Truly" and "8 Mile Road"
- e - additional vocals on "Come To Mama, She Say"
- Michael Stipe - additional vocals on "Everybody Needs a Little Sanctuary"
