= All That You Can Dream =

Studio album by Grant-Lee Phillips
- Released: May 20, 2022
- Recorded: 2021
- Studios: Home studios across the US: Jamie Edwards' home, Boston, Massachusetts; Eric Heywood's home, Butte, Montana; Jennifer Condos' home, Los Angeles, California; Richard Dodd's home, Los Angeles, California; Phillips' home, Nashville, Tennessee
- Length: 47:26
- Language: English
- Label: Yep Roc
- Producer: Grant-Lee Phillips

Grant-Lee Phillips chronology
Lightning, Show Us Your Stuff (2020)	All That You Can Dream (2022)

All That You Can Dream is a 2022 studio album by American singer-songwriter Grant-Lee Phillips. It has received positive reviews from critics.

== Reception ==
According to the review aggregator Metacritic, All That You Can Dream received "generally favorable reviews" based on a weighted average score of 76 out of 100 from 4 critic scores. Editors at AllMusic rated this album 3.5 out of 5 stars, with critic Mark Deming writing "All That You Can Dream doesn't sound like a homemade album" in spite of being recorded in home studios due to the COVID-19 pandemic and that the recording shows subtle themes of political outrage and cultural criticism where Phillips "delivers his messages with the graceful impressionistic croon that has been the hallmark of his work". Lee Zimmerman of American Songwriter noted the anxiety and frustration associated with recording during the pandemic and continued that "by turns both anxious and emphatic, the new album finds Phillips surveying a wide sweep of emotion even while contemplating the confounding questions everyone's facing at a time where there are mooted possibilities of finding simple solutions". James McNair of Mojo gave this release 4 out of 5 stars, stating that Phillips has "surpassed himself with this intimate late flourish [with] 11 searching, beautifully rendered songs which rhythm section Jay Bellerose and Jennifer Condos finesse with artful subtlety". No Depression's Jon Young called this recording "wonderfully understated chamber-folk shaped by his weary yet graceful voice and insightful songs" that is "intensely personal and thoroughly relatable at once". Writing for Uncut, Andrew Mueller rated All That You Can Dream a 7 out of 10, stating that the result of the recording circumstances is "unsurprisingly... a downbeat, ruminative affair", continuing that "this is no hardship, given the agility and empathy" of Phillips' delivery.

== Track listing ==
All songs written by Grant-Lee Phillips

1. "A Sudden Place" – 4:13
2. "Cruel Trick" – 4:27
3. "Peace Is a Delicate Thing" – 5:20
4. "All That You Can Dream" – 4:54
5. "Rats in a Barrel" – 4:52
6. "Cannot Trust the Ground" – 3:35
7. "Cut to the Ending" – 3:06
8. "You Can't Hide" – 4:12
9. "My Eyes Have Seen" – 4:01
10. "Remember This" – 4:03
11. "All by Heart" – 4:44

== Personnel ==
- Grant-Lee Phillips – guitars, piano, Mellotron, pump organ, keyboards, vocals, production, artwork, art direction
- John Baldwin – audio mastering at John Baldwin Mastering, Nashville, Tennessee, United States
- Jay Bellerose – drums, percussion
- Jennifer Condos – bass guitar
- Richard Dodd – cello on "A Sudden Place"
- Jamie Edwards – piano on "A Sudden Place", "Cut to the Ending", and "My Eyes Have Seen"; Chamberlin on "My Eyes Have Seen"
- Nathan Golub – art direction
- Eric Heywood – pedal steel guitar on "Remember This"

== See also ==
- 2022 in American music
- List of 2022 albums
