= Lightning, Show Us Your Stuff =

Studio album by Grant-Lee Phillips
- Released: September 4, 2020
- Label: Yep Roc
- Producer: Grant-Lee Phillips

Grant-Lee Phillips chronology
| Widdershins (2018) | Lightning, Show Us Your Stuff (2020) | All That You Can Dream (2022) |

Lightning, Show Us Your Stuff is the tenth studio album by Grant-Lee Phillips. It was released on September 4, 2020, through Yep Roc Records. The album debuted at #9 on Billboard's Americana/Folk Albums Chart, #11 on Top New Artist Albums (Heatseekers), and #28 on Current Rock Albums.

== Background ==
The album title is inspired by Phillips' young daughter, who once shouted "Come on lightning, show us your stuff" while pointing a branch at the night sky. On this album, Phillips addresses the fragility of life, approaching the subject with a mix of intensity and humor. Phillips stated, "There's definitely a questioning - I notice it on my more direct or confessional songs like 'Mourning Dove'. I think about the people we are when we come into the world, how we get beat up along the way and sometimes corrupted in pursuit of some brass ring. As the line goes, the things we chase that can't be kept. I'll admit it's that nagging tendency to question everything that inspires a song like 'Drawing the Head' and even when I'm writing through the voice of a character, as I am with 'Straight to the Ground'."

== Critical reception ==
Lightning, Show Us Your Stuff received "generally favorable reviews" from critics. The review aggregation site Metacritic assigned a weighted average score of 79 out of 100 based on 6 critic reviews, indicating generally favorable reviews.

Lee Zimmerman, writing for American Songwriter, described the album as "an album for the ages, and a record that's representative of Phillips in all his prolific prowess."

Mojo gave the album a 4-star review, stating, "Phillips' latest beguiles with all the wiles of a master songwriter...A late-onset triumph."

Daniel Kohn of Spin noted that on "Lightning, Show Us Your Stuff, his 10th studio album, [Phillips] continues to build on his gentle songwriting that’s defined his career.”

AllMusic rated the album 3.5 out of 5 stars, commenting, "Lightning Show Us Your Stuff doesn't feel like one of the truly great albums in Grant-Lee Phillips's catalog, but it's certainly a very good one, and any artist who can reliably turn out music this smart, impassioned, and well-crafted is someone who more than deserves a larger audience."

== Track listing ==
Lightning, Show Us Your Stuff track listing
| No. | Title | Writer(s) | Length |
|---|---|---|---|
| 1. | "Ain't Done Yet" | Grant-Lee Phillips | 3:26 |
| 2. | "Drawing the Head" | Grant-Lee Phillips | 2:47 |
| 3. | "Lowest Low" | Grant-Lee Phillips | 3:22 |
| 4. | "Leave a Light On" | Grant-Lee Phillips | 3:51 |
| 5. | "Mourning Dove" | Grant-Lee Phillips | 4:12 |
| 6. | "Sometimes You Wake Up in Charleston" | Grant-Lee Phillips | 3:38 |
| 7. | "Gather Up" | Grant-Lee Phillips | 2:59 |
| 8. | "Straight to the Ground" | Grant-Lee Phillips | 5:26 |
| 9. | "Coming To" | Grant-Lee Phillips | 4:36 |
| 10. | "Walking in My Sleep" | Grant-Lee Phillips | 3:20 |
| Total length: | | | 37:39 |

== Personnel ==
Musicians

- Grant-Lee Phillips: Vocals, Guitars, Piano, Organ
- Jay Bellerose: Drums, Percussion
- Jennifer Condos: Bass
- Eric Heywood: Pedal Steel, Guitars
- Danny T. Levin: Euphonium, Trombonium, Coronet

Production

- Produced by Grant-Lee Phillips
- Recorded and Mixed by Pete Min at Lucy's Meat Market, Los Angeles, CA
- Mastered by Kimberly Rosen at Knack Mastering, Ringwood, NJ
