= The Narrows (album) =

Studio album by Grant-Lee Phillips
- Released: March 18, 2016
- Studios: Easy Eye Sound (Nashville, Tennessee)
- Genres: Americana; indie rock
- Length: 54:12
- Label: Yep Roc
- Producer: Grant-Lee Phillips

Grant-Lee Phillips chronology
Walking in the Green Corn (2012)	The Narrows (2016)	Widdershins (2018)

Professional ratings
Aggregate scores
Source	Rating
Metacritic	83/100
Review scores
Source	Rating
AllMusic	4/5 stars
Blurt	4/5 stars
Exclaim!	7/10
PopMatters	8/10

The Narrows is the eighth studio album by American singer-songwriter Grant-Lee Phillips. It was released on March 18, 2016 under Yep Roc Records.

== Critical reception ==
The Narrows was met with universal acclaim from critics. At Metacritic, which assigns a weighted average rating out of 100 to reviews from mainstream publications, this release received an average score of 83, based on 8 reviews. Aggregator Album of the Year gave the release a 79 out of 100 based on a critical consensus of 6 reviews.

== Track listing ==
The Narrows track listing
No.	Title	Length
1.	"Tennessee Rain"	4:45
2.	"Smoke and Sparks"	3:39
3.	"Moccasin Creek"	2:38
4.	"Cry Cry"	4:18
5.	"Holy Irons"	4:34
6.	"Yellow Weeds"	5:12
7.	"Loaded Gun"	2:41
8.	"Rolling Pin"	3:27
9.	"Taking on Weight in Hot Springs"	3:40
10.	"Just Another River Town"	4:03
11.	"No Mercy in July"	4:41
12.	"San Andreas Fault"	5:42
13.	"Find My Way"	4:52

iTunes Deluxe Edition
No.	Title	Length
14.	"Tennessee Rain (acoustic version)"	4:50
15.	"Smoke and Sparks (acoustic version)"	3:54
16.	"Moccasin Creek (acoustic version)"	2:39
17.	"Find My Way (acoustic version)"	5:02

== Personnel ==
Musicians

- Grant-Lee Phillips – primary artist, guitar, vocals, producer
- Lex Price – bass, guitar, backing vocals
- Jerry Roe – drums, backing vocals
- Jamie Edwards – organ
- Eric Gorfain – fiddle
- Russ Pahl – guitar

Production

- John Baldwin – mastering
- Collin Dupuis – engineer, mixing

== Charts ==
Chart performance for The Narrows
Chart (2016)	Peak position
Belgian Albums (Ultratop Flanders)	125
US Americana/Folk Albums (Billboard)	16
US Heatseekers Albums (Billboard)	10
US Independent Albums (Billboard)	42
