= Virginia Creeper (album) =

Studio album by Grant-Lee Phillips
- Released: February 24, 2004
- Recorded: August 1–14, 2003
- Studios: Sunset Sound Factory, Hollywood, California
- Genres: Americana; indie rock
- Length: 48:04
- Label: Zoë
- Producer: Grant-Lee Phillips

Grant-Lee Phillips chronology
Mobilize (2001)	Virginia Creeper (2004)	nineteeneighties (2006)

Professional ratings
Aggregate scores
Source	Rating
Metacritic	77/100
Review scores
Source	Rating
AllMusic	4/5 stars
E! Online	B
The Guardian	4/5 stars
PopMatters	favorable
Stylus Magazine	F

Virginia Creeper is the third album by American singer-songwriter Grant-Lee Phillips, released on February 24, 2004.

== Critical reception ==
Virginia Creeper was met with "generally favorable" reviews from critics. At Metacritic, which assigns a weighted average rating out of 100 to reviews from mainstream publications, this release received an average score of 77, based on 14 reviews.

== Track listing ==
All tracks are written by Grant-Lee Phillips, unless noted.

Virginia Creeper tracklist
No.	Title	Writer(s)	Length
1.	"Mona Lisa"		4:11
2.	"Walking Memory"		4:07
3.	"Lily-A-Passion"		4:30
4.	"Dirty Secret"		3:37
5.	"Always Friends"		3:33
6.	"Calamity Jane"		3:44
7.	"Josephine of the Swamps"		5:22
8.	"Far End of the Night"		4:46
9.	"Susanna Little"		6:08
10.	"Wish I Knew"		3:58
11.	"Hickory Wind"	Bob Buchanon; Gram Parsons	4:08

== Personnel ==
Musicians

- Grant-Lee Phillips – primary artist, piano, producer
- Richard Dodd – cello
- Danny Frankel – percussion
- Eric Gorfain – violin
- Sheldon Gomberg – bass
- Sebastian Steinberg – bass
- Jon Brion – ukulele
- Bill "Luigi" Bonk – accordion
- Greg Leisz – Dobro, mandolin
- Leah Katz – viola
- Cindy Wasserman – vocals
- Zac Rae – keyboard

Production

- Gavin Lurssen – mastering
- S. Husky Höskulds – engineer, mixer

== Release history ==
Region	Date	Label	Format(s)	Catalog
UK	February 24, 2004	Cooking Vinyl	CD, LP	COOKCD249
US	February 24, 2004	Zoë	CD, LP	01143-1043-2
