= Slim Cessna's Auto Club =

American country rock band

Slim Cessna's Auto
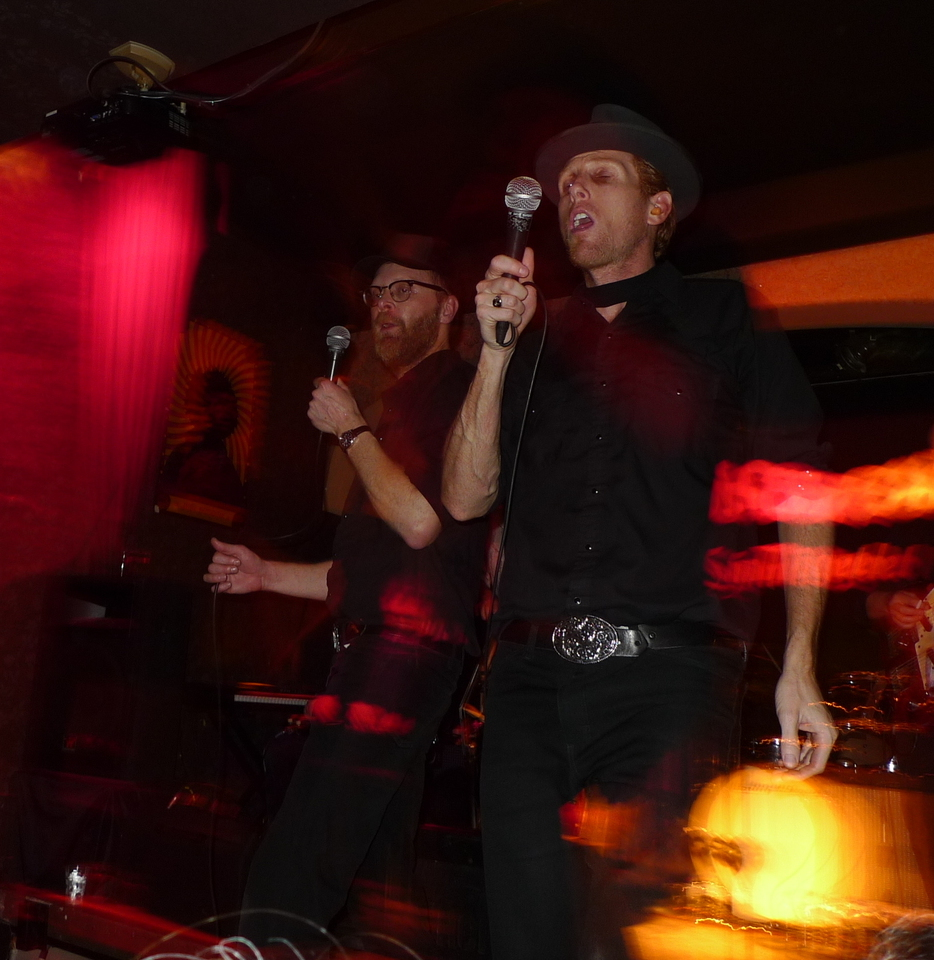
- Slim Cessna (L) and Munly Munly of Slim Cessna's Auto Club at Le Bukowski club

Background information
- Origin: Denver, Colorado, U.S.
- Genres: Gothic country; gothabilly; cowpunk; alternative country; country rock
- Years active: 1992–2026
- Labels: SCAC; Glitterhouse; Alternative Tentacles; Smooch
- Members: Slim Cessna; George "Snake" Cessna; Munly Munly; Lord Dwight Pentecost; Rebecca Vera; Andrew Warner

Slim Cessna's Auto Club is an American country rock band from Denver, Colorado. Formed in 1992, the band is known for lyrics which describe apocalyptic and religious imagery.

== History ==
=== Formation ===
==== Original lineup ====
The sole constant in this band is Slim Cessna. SCAC was born from the break-up of The Denver Gentlemen – a band that included both David Eugene Edwards and Jeffery-Paul Norlander of 16 Horsepower.

==== Naming of the band ====
The name "Slim Cessna's Auto Club" originally came about as a tribute to Cessna's friend who had a car collection:

"Several years ago, before the band even started, when I was just singing and playing guitar with my friends, there was this friend of mine who had a whole bunch of cars. His name was John, and he had all of these cars. And they weren't cool cars; they were old, junky cars, but he had about fifteen of them. So we started calling ourselves San Juan's Car Club, as a tribute to him. Over time, it mutated a few times, and it ended up as the Auto Club. I'm not sure why. I think we were trying to play off of the idea of low-rider car clubs, imagining a club like that, but with our friend's old beat-up cars instead of cool cars."

== Career ==
=== Early works ===
Slim Cessna's Auto Club is the debut studio album of the band. It was self-released in 1995, then re-released by Alternative Tentacles in 2001.

American Country Music Changed Her Life is the first live album recorded by SCAC. It was self-released in 1998 and is currently out of print.

=== Record deal with Alternative Tentacles (2000–2011) ===
==== Always Say Please and Thank You (2000) ====
Always Say Please and Thank You is the second studio album by SCAC. It was released by Alternative Tentacles on September 11, 2000. Not only is this their first album to be released by the record label, it is the first album that long-time collaborators Munly Munly and Lord Dwight Pentecost make an appearance on. Rebecca Vera also plays cello on two tracks.

The band lineup for this album was: Slim Cessna, Munly Munly, Lord Dwight Pentecost, Ordy Garrison, Daniel "Danny Pants" Grandbois, and John Rumley.

It was produced by Bob Ferbrache at Le Studio Absenta.

The cover artwork was created by Rob Clayton and the design by Jason Rosenberg.

The album was re-released by SCAC Unincorporated some time in 2015.

==== The Bloudy Tenent Truth [&] Peace (2004) ====
The Bloudy Tenent Truth & Peace is the third studio album by SCAC, released by Alternative Tentacles on August 24, 2004. In many news articles, the "&" in the title is often discarded and not mentioned, perhaps incorrectly.

The band lineup for this album was: Slim Cessna, Munly Munly, Lord Dwight Pentecost, Reverend Adam Glasseye, Tim Maher, and Judith Ann "Judithann" Winter.

The artwork was created by Victoria Cessna, Slim's wife at the time.

It was recorded, mixed, and produced by Pete Weiss and Matt Jugenheimer at Zippah Studios in Brookline, Massachusetts.

It was re-released by SCAC Unincorporated some time in 2015.

==== Jesus Let Me Down, the Live Tragedie in Four Acts (2005/2010) ====
Jesus Let Me Down, the Live Tragedie in Four Acts is the second live album recorded by SCAC. It is a live recording of The Bloudy Tenent Truth & Peace album release show, recorded at the Gothic Theater in Denver on August 21, 2004.

The double-CD version was released by Smooch Records on January 1, 2005. Alternative Tentacles released the vinyl version sometime in 2010, which contains an 8-page play on the four-act "tragedie." It was later re-released by SCAC Unincorporated, although the exact date is unknown.

The album was produced by Bob Ferbrache at Absinthe Studios.

The cover artwork for the CD and vinyl formats was designed by former member Jon Killough. The artwork features the band members Slim Cessna, Munly Munly, Lord Dwight Pentecost, Daniel "Danny Pants" Grandbois, and John Rumley.

==== Cipher (2008) ====
The band released their fourth studio album, titled Cipher, on Alternative Tentacles on March 25, 2008. This album has received the most critical acclaim out of the entire SCAC discography.

The artwork for this album was created by Heather Reynolds. The lettering was completed by former member Jon Killough. The photography was taken by Gary Isaacs. The cryptography might have been conceived by Munly.

The band lineup for this album was: Slim Cessna, Munly Munly, Lord Dwight Pentecost, Ordy Garrison, John Rumley, and Shane Trost.

It was re-released through the band's own independent label, SCAC Unincorporated, on June 2, 2017, although it is currently out-of-print.

==== Buried Behind the Barn (2004/2010) ====
Buried Behind the Barn is a compilation of demo and previously unreleased songs recorded between 2000 and 2001. In 2004, only 200 copies were self-released. Alternative Tentacles gave it a wider release on March 16, 2010. The cover artwork was designed by former member Jon Killough. It was re-released by SCAC Unincorporated Records some time in 2015.

The lineup for this album was: Slim Cessna, Munly Munly, Lord Dwight Pentecost, Ordy Garrison, Daniel "Danny Pants" Grandbois, and John Rumley.

It was recorded at Le Studio Absentia, in Westminster, Colorado, and produced by Bob Ferbrache, a former member of SCAC.

==== Unentitled (2011) ====
Their fifth studio album, Unentitled, was released through Alternative Tentacles on March 1, 2011. It was later re-released by SCAC Unincorporated, although the exact date is unknown.

The band lineup for this album was: Slim Cessna, Munly Munly, Lord Dwight Pentecost, Daniel "Danny Pants" Grandbois, Chad "Chadzilla" Johnson, and John Rumley.

It was recorded and produced by Bob Ferbrache at Absinthe Studios in Westminster, Colorado.

The cover artwork for the album was created by Heather Reynolds.

=== Record deal with Glitterhouse Records (2013–present) ===
==== SCAC 102: An Introduction For Young And Old Europe (2013) ====
April 2013 saw the release of "SCAC 102 An Introduction For Young And Old Europe" on Germany's Glitterhouse Records, which included a selection of fifteen songs from their studio albums ("Always Say Please & Thank You" and later). Five of the songs were re-recorded for this release. "SCAC 102" also included a live performance DVD which was filmed in April 2012 at the Lion's Lair Tavern in Denver, Colorado (produced by Nick Hansen-MacDonald and Trinocular Films).

==== The Commandments According To SCAC (2016) ====
In September 2016, Slim Cessna's Auto Club released their sixth studio album, titled “The Commandments According To SCAC," on SCAC Unincorporated (North America) and on Glitterhouse Records (Europe.) The album was recorded with a new bassist, Ian O’Dougherty.

==== Kinnery of Lupercalia; Buell Legion (2024) ====
In May 2024, Kinnery of Lupercalia; Buell Legion was released as part of a trilogy started with Munly & The Lupercalians' Kinnery of Lupercalia; Undelivered Legion in 2022. The final part will be released by Denver Broncos UK. The lyrics for the three records are based on Munly J. Munly's book, Confessions to Scare.... A separate book, Chants, Calls & Hollers was released as well, featuring lyrics from all the songs in the trilogy and various illustrations by Heather Reynolds.

=== SCAC Unincorporated Records (2015–present) ===
==== Inception ====
In March 2015, the band created their own record label, SCAC Unincorporated (sometimes stylized in all capital letters and sometimes abbreviated as "SCACUninc", also in all capital letters). The label is home to all recordings by SCAC, Denver Broncos UK, and Munly's side projects.

Slim Cessna said that the reason for creating this label was because he wanted to "take control" of the band's musical catalog.

==== Releases ====
All of the band's albums, except for their self-titled album, were given a re-release in March 2015.

The first official release by the label, also in March 2015, was a re-issue (this time for the US) of "SCAC 102 An Introduction For Young And Old Europe."

The label's second release, in October 2015, was the debut album by DBUK (Denver Broncos UK), Songs One Through Eight.

The third release was The Commandments According to SCAC in 2016.

The fourth release was DBUK's sophomore album Songs Nine Through Sixteen on January 25, 2019.

The fifth release will be from Munly and the Lupercalians. In February 2020, it was announced by Westword that the new album would be titled Kinnery of Lupercalia: Undelivered Legion and would be released in the latter half of the year.

=== Touring ===
The band has embarked on several tours across the United States and Europe, with and without supporting bands. They have toured with Nathaniel Rateliff & Night Sweats and Kid Congo & the Pink Monkey Birds.

Their Spring and Summer 2020 tours with The Legendary Shack Shakers and The BellRays were cancelled in 2020 and in 2021 due to the COVID-19 pandemic. In 2026, Slim Cessna announced the band's retirement.

== Other endeavors ==
=== Side projects ===
==== Denver Broncos UK ====
The Denver Broncos UK is an experimental folk quartet that began touring together in 2012. They are now commonly referred to as DBUK in order to dispel any notion that they are connected to the Denver Broncos football team or the Broncos' fanbase in the United Kingdom.

The band formed in 2006 with just Munly, Lord Dwight Pentecost, and Slim Cessna; Rebecca Vera joined later on. All members contribute vocals and all members except Munly play some sort of percussion. In addition, Munly plays the guitar, Rebecca plays the cello and keys, and Dwight plays autoharp, melodica, and banjo.

Their debut full-length album, Songs One Through Eight was released in March 2015 by their own label, SCACUNINCORPORATED. A few songs that appear on the album are original recordings from 2006 and 2007, which do not include Rebecca. Songs Nine Through Sixteen was released in October 2019, also on their own record label. A double-album titled Songs One Through Sixteen was released in November 2018 through the European record label Glitterhouse Records.

Their cover of "Top Yourself" by The Raconteurs is included on the album Rockin' Legends Pay Tribute to Jack White, released in November 2013.

In December 2020, DBUK covered "The Safety Dance" by Men Without Hats for Wheelerfest 2020, a two-day virtual musical event which hosted by musician Sean Wheeler and broadcast from Mexico City, Mexico. Each band created one or more videos to contribute with a "freak show" theme. In DBUK's video, Munly sat outside on a chair, wearing a black hat, clothing, and a non-surgical cloth mask. He held a "dummy" baby doll in his arms and manually moved the doll's mouth to the lyrics. There were computerized graphics interspersed between. An official recording of the song has not been released.

==== Munly and The Lupercalians ====
'Munly and the Lupercalians' was founded by Munly around 2006–2007. The original lineup of the band included many, if not all, members of his first side project, The Lee Lewis Harlots. The current lineup contains most of the current members of Slim Cessna's Auto Club: Munly, Slim Cessna, Lord Dwight Pentecost, Rebecca Vera, and Andrew Warner. On stage, each band member, except for Munly, wears a costume that identifies them as a potential member of the fictional town of 'Lupercalia.'

The goal is to produce a multi-album set tentatively titled The Kinnery Of Lupercalia, which is all about the town and its colorful residents. Its residents have been described as "families who interact with each other" and Lupercalia as an "imagined community of Legions & clans where we are not sure who is a deity and who is not."

Although an unauthorized demo album was released in 2009, the first official album by the band, Petr & the Wulf, was released in October 2010 through Alternative Tentacles. It was re-released through their own independent record label, SCAC Unincorporated, around 2015. The work is loosely based on the Peter and the Wolf composition by Sergei Prokofiev, and is said to be a prequel to the stories of Lupercalia told over a span of four albums.

On March 24, 2022, the band posted the vinyl album cover art for Kinnery of Lupercalia: Undelivered Legion, and announced that it would be available to pre-order until the official release date of May 13, 2022. The first single, “Ahmen”, was released on March 21, 2022.

The band also stated that this would be the only KOL album recorded by them; the other two will be recorded and released by Slim Cessna’s Auto Club and DBUK.

=== Other appearances ===
In 1996, SCAC appeared twice on More Than Mountains: A Benefit For Colorado Conservation, a compilation album released by W.A.R Records. "Champagne Like A Lady" and "Blindman" were included.

The song "Earthquake" was featured on the Smooch Records compilation album Radio 1190: Local Shakedown, Vol. 1 in 2000. Many of the songs on Buried Behind the Barn were also featured on Crossbreeding Begins at Home, another Smooch Records compilation album, which received a limited release of 200 copies in January 2004. "Angel" was featured on Radio 1190: Local Shakedown, Vol. 2 in 2004.

Munly and Slim Cessna were featured in a segment of "Seven Signs: Music, Myth, and the American South" (2008), a film by JD Wilkes of Th' Legendary Shack Shakers. Munly recited the original story "Döder Made Me Do It" and joined Slim in an acoustic version of their song "Children of the Lord".

The band performed a cover of "Ain't My Problem Baby" for Axels & Sockets, the third and final installment of The Jeffrey Lee Pierce Sessions Project, released by Glitterhouse Records on May 2, 2014.

They recorded two in-studio performances for Daytrotter/Paste Magazine – one in Rock Island, Illinois in 2012 and the other in Davenport, Iowa in 2017.

== Members ==
=== Current members ===
==== Slim Cessna ====
Slim Cessna was born on February 10, 1966 in Colorado. He has been SCAC's only constant member since 1992, performing vocal and frontman duties onstage. He was born and raised in Colorado, but has also lived in Providence, Rhode Island and Pittsburgh, Pennsylvania before eventually moving back to Denver. He is a former member of The Denver Gentlemen and The Blackstone Valley Sinners. He is a founding member of The Denver Broncos UK (DBUK) and a member of Munly & The Lupercalians. He has pursued solo endeavors as well. He has two children from a previous marriage: one daughter, Amelia (born in 1990) and one son, fellow SCAC member George Cessna.

==== George Cessna ====
George Cessna, born on November 24, 1991, formally joined the band in 2018, replacing bassist Ian O'Dougherty. He is frontman Slim Cessna's son. He is the frontman and songwriter for Snakes and formerly of The Sterling Sisters. His most recent project is "Lucky Rider", an album he completed with Brian Buck and released in November 2021. He has a career as a solo artist as well.

==== Munly Munly ====
Jay Munly, often credited as 'Munly Munly', was born on August 31 (year unknown) in Quebec, Canada. He had completed three albums as a solo artist before joining the band in 1998, around the same time as Lord Dwight Pentecost, after being friends with Slim Cessna for a few years. He is a key member of the current lineup of the band. In addition to vocals and instruments, he serves as a sidekick to Cessna on stage. He mostly plays the banjo, but has also played the guitar, ukulele, and mandolin. He has also served as SCAC's primary songwriter since Always Say Please and Thank You (2000). He is a founding member of The Denver Broncos UK (DBUK), Munly and the Lupercalians, and Munly and the Lee Lewis Harlots, who were active from 2000 to 2007. He was also one-third of "The Road Home," a band with Scott Kelly and Noah Landis of Neurosis, in 2015. He has been in a long-term relationship with fellow member Rebecca Vera since 2004.

==== Lord Dwight Pentecost ====
Lord Dwight Pentecost was born on August 29 (year unknown) in rural Illinois. He joined the band in 1998, around the same as Munly Munly. He plays guitar and banjo and occasionally provides backing vocals for the band. Former member John Rumley designed his double-neck guitar. When he first joined the band, he went by 'Reverend' instead of 'Lord', since he was licensed to perform weddings. He lived in Boston, Massachusetts and Chicago, Illinois before moving back to Denver, Colorado. He is a founding member of The Denver Broncos UK (DBUK) and a member of Munly and the Lupercalians.

==== Rebecca Vera ====
Rebecca Vera was born on July 21, 1972 in Elgin, Illinois. She joined the band in 2016 as a pedal steel player. Before formally joining SCAC, she was a founding member of Munly & The Lee Lewis Harlots in 2000 and Munly & The Lupercalians in 2007. She also played cello and provided backing vocals for 16 Horsepower and Munly's solo efforts. Between 1998 and 1999, she collaborated with Jeffrey-Paul Norlander on an "industrial techno" project, Hoitoitoi, where she sang and played the violin in addition to the cello. She currently provides backing vocals, in addition to playing cello, pedal steel, and harmonium, in The Denver Broncos UK (DBUK) and Munly & The Lupercalians. Besides music, she has also pursued a career as a veterinary technician since 2002. She has been in a long-term relationship with Munly since 2004.

==== Andrew Warner ====
Andrew Warner, born August 9 (year unknown), joined the band in August 2016, replacing drummer Todd "The Peeler" Moore. He also plays drums in the bands Munly and the Lupercalians, Bad Luck City, Snake Rattle Rattle Snake, Cloak of Organs, and Weathered Statues.

=== Past members ===
- Steve "Whiff" Cessna- banjo
- Ian O'Dougherty – bass (2016–2019)
- Bob Ferbrache
- Gregory Garcia, Jr. – drums, percussion (c. 2009)
- Ordy Garrison
- Reverend Adam Glasseye (c. 2004)
- Daniel "Danny Pants" Grandbois – keyboards
- Frank Hauser, Jr.
- Chad "Chadzilla" Johnson – drums, percussion
- Jon Killough
- Tim Maher (c. 2004)
- Todd "The Peeler" Moore – drums, percussion
- Caleb Roberts
- John Rumley – guitar, keyboards, pedal steel (c. 1995–2009)
- Shane Trost – stand-up bass, trumpet (c. 2008–2009)
- Judith Ann "Judithann" Winters (c. 2004)

== Musical style ==
Country Standard Time says that although the band is categorized under many genre descriptions, including alternative country, psychobilly, cowpunk and goth-country, the band prefers to classify their own music as simply being country music. The Oklahoma Gazette said that the band "started out as a traditional Western act [before it] morphed into a rowdy, Americana style dubbed gothabilly cowpunk." Crawdaddy! said that the group breaks from country music traditions by featuring elements such as "the occasional banjo-feedback solo or bowed and distorted pedal steel guitar". Co-frontman Slim Cessna suggested in this profile that the group had more in common with folk music than alternative country, while the band's pedal steel guitarist/keyboard player John Rumley said that he saw the band's music as being similar to that of 1970s rock bands Black Sabbath, Brownsville Station and Deep Purple, and Jay Munly, the band's guitarist, banjo player, singer, and co-frontman, said that he considers Slim Cessna's Auto Club to be a rock band.

A profile in KRCC said that the band has also been classified as "gothabilly - alternative country music with apocalyptic religious themes often fueled by alcohol, violence and love run amok". CBS described their music as a "mix of boozy gothic country and fervent gospel punk". Indie 102.3 compared the band's live performances to "finding yourself in a gospel tent-revival besieged by punks—expect speaking in tongues and a mosh pit."

The Plain Dealer wrote, "Since the mid-1990s, the Denver outfit has explored the darker, more twisted edges of the genre with an idiosyncratic brand of Gothic Americana laced with frenetic rhythms and a vocal delivery that, at times, comes off like an auctioneer fronting a country-western band." AllMusic described them as a country-punk band, and "country-bluegrass-gospel testifiers", saying that they "play country gospel with a fervor that seems to emanate from a punk pulpit." Their sound has also been described as "Gogol Bordello dosed on Americana". The Cleveland Scene wrote, describing the band's sound, "Yodeling gospel through gold teeth, Cessna leads a quintet of dizzying organ, weeping steel guitar, and deep-twang six-string, guiding the flock through nondenominational obsessing on Jesus and his sacrifices. Dressed in suits and cowboy hats, the Auto Club splits its time between praising the Lord and using his name as an expletive." The Orlando Weekly described the band as having a "country-rock sound with an eerie gospel aesthetic", writing, "The deep, dark loam of American folk music from which the gothic country gospel of Slim Cessna's Auto Club slithers and thrives [...] obscures the line between devotion and something perhaps more off", suggesting that the band is the "less cartoonish, more earnest country kin of the Legendary Shack Shakers". The Patriot Ledger wrote that Slim Cessna's Auto Club "has made a career out of upending the expectations of rock, country, and Americana music fans" and are defined by a "surreal, Southern Gothic, alt-country rock style".

Spectrum Culture wrote that the band's lyrics "frequently wrestle with the nature of good and evil against a backdrop of the spooky, rattlesnake-laden landscape of our nation’s western reaches. This is the other old, weird America; not the one re-imagined by The Band in tales about the Civil War and the woes of farmers on the edge of the abyss. This is the lawless, ruggedly individualized and grotesque world of such writers as Cormac McCarthy and Flannery O'Connor, with a forbidding darkness that hovers like a hawk circling its prey."

== Discography ==
=== Studio albums ===
- Slim Cessna's Auto Club (1995)
- Always Say Please and Thank You (2000)
- The Bloudy Tenent Truth & Peace (2004)
- Buried Behind the Barn (2004) – demos and unreleased songs
- Cipher (2008)
- Unentitled (2011)
- SCAC 102: An Introduction For Young And Old Europe (2013, Glitterhouse Records, CD + live DVD)
- The Commandments According to SCAC (2016)
- Kinnery of Lupercalia; Buell Legion (2024)

=== Live albums ===
- American Country Music Changed Her Life (1998)
- Jesus Let Me Down (2005)
- Jesus Let Me Down: The Live Tragedie in Four Acts (2010)

== Filmography and videography ==
The band released a 20th anniversary double album and DVD collection that included a new music video for their song Jesus Is In My Body, My Body Has Let Me Down. The video was originally published online, but is currently no longer available. The band also published another video from their 20th anniversary collection, titled Slim Cessna's Auto Club "Magalina Hagalina Boom Boom" online.
