= Mighty Joe Moon =

Studio album by Grant Lee Buffalo
- Released: September 20, 1994
- Studios: Brilliant (San Francisco, California); Master Control (Burbank, California)
- Genres: Alternative rock; alternative country; folk rock
- Length: 46:24
- Labels: Slash; Reprise
- Producer: Paul Kimble

Grant Lee Buffalo chronology
Fuzzy (1993)	Mighty Joe Moon (1994)	Copperopolis (1996)

Singles from Mighty Joe Moon
- 1. "Lone Star Song" Released: 1994; 2. "Mockingbirds" Released: 1994; 3. "Honey Don't Think" Released: 1995

Mighty Joe Moon is the second studio album by American rock band Grant Lee Buffalo, released in 1994 by Slash Records and Reprise Records.

== Critical reception ==
Professional ratings
Review scores
Source	Rating
AllMusic	4.5/5 stars
Chicago Tribune	3/4 stars
Encyclopedia of Popular Music	5/5 stars
The Guardian	3/4 stars
Q	4/5 stars
Rolling Stone	4/5 stars
The Village Voice	C+

Music critic Dave Thompson called the record "wide screen variation on its predecessor, a sound as big as a Montana sky wrestling with Philips' grasp on both his lyrical and emotional abilities".

== Track listing ==
All tracks are written by Grant Lee Phillips.

No.	Title	Length
1.	"Lone Star Song"	4:34
2.	"Mockingbirds"	4:40
3.	"It's the Life"	2:57
4.	"Sing Along"	4:26
5.	"Mighty Joe Moon"	2:49
6.	"Demon Called Deception"	2:51
7.	"Lady Godiva and Me"	5:02
8.	"Drag"	3:05
9.	"Last Days of Tecumseh"	1:02
10.	"Happiness"	3:00
11.	"Honey Don't Think"	2:43
12.	"Side by Side"	6:54
13.	"Rock of Ages"	4:14

== Personnel ==
Credits adapted from liner notes.

- Grant Lee Phillips – vocals, acoustic and electric guitar, banjo, dobro, mandolin, harmonica
- Paul Kimble – bass, piano, pump organ, electric organ, vocals
- Joey Peters – drum set, tumbuk, tambourine, tablas, maracas, marimba, shakers, acquired hunks of metal
- Greg Adamson – cello on "Mockingbirds"
- Greg Leisz – pedal steel guitar on "Lady Godiva and Me"

== Charts ==
Chart (1994)	Peak position
Australian Albums (ARIA)	48
New Zealand Albums (RMNZ)	23
Norwegian Albums (VG-lista)	8
Scottish Albums (Official Charts)	26
Swedish Albums (Sverigetopplistan)	38
UK Albums (Official Charts)	24
US Heatseekers Albums (Billboard)	16
