= Widdershins (album) =

Studio album by Grant-Lee Phillips
- Released: February 23, 2018
- Studios: Sound Emporium (Nashville, Tennessee)
- Genres: Americana; indie rock
- Length: 41:18
- Label: Yep Roc
- Producer: Grant-Lee Phillips

Grant-Lee Phillips chronology
The Narrows (2016)	Widdershins (2018)	Lightning, Show Us Your Stuff (2020)

Professional ratings
Aggregate scores
Source	Rating
AnyDecentMusic?	7.3/10
Metacritic	78/100
Review scores
Source	Rating
AllMusic	4/5 stars
Classic Rock	4/5 stars
PopMatters	8/10
The Skinny	4/5 stars

Widdershins is the ninth studio album by American singer-songwriter Grant-Lee Phillips. It was released on February 23, 2018 under Yep Roc Records.

== Production ==
The album was recorded over a four-day period at the Sound Emporium Studios in Nashville, Tennessee. It was mixed by Tucker Martine and engineered by Mike Stankiewicz.

== Critical reception ==
Widdershins was met with "generally favorable" reviews from critics. At Metacritic, which assigns a weighted average rating out of 100 to reviews from mainstream publications, this release received an average score of 78, based on 8 reviews. Aggregator Album of the Year gave the release a 78 out of 100 based on a critical consensus of 5 reviews.

Mark Deming of AllMusic said the album "is full of joy and purpose, and Phillips has married them to a great set of hooky tunes with a folk-rock slant. He hasn't entirely abandoned the moody undertow that's always been a part of his music, but the unspoken message behind these songs is that this is not a time to brood, and Phillips has rarely sounded quite this lively and direct." Chris Roberts from Classic Rock said: "Whether it’s sideways social comment blazing with guitars, or poignant self-reflection with undulating melodies, this showcases his soulful, vulnerable voice, which never fails to catch every colour in a song. Locating the sweet spot where spontaneity and polish meet, Widdershins swings in all the right directions."

== Track listing ==
Widdershins track listing
No.	Title	Length
1.	"Walk in Circles"	3:32
2.	"Unruly Mobs"	2:26
3.	"King of Catastrophes"	3:13
4.	"Something's Gotta' Give"	3:02
5.	"Scared Stiff"	2:31
6.	"Miss Betsy"	3:29
7.	"The Wilderness"	3:25
8.	"Another, Another, Then Boom"	2:56
9.	"Totally You Gunslinger"	3:31
10.	"History Has Their Number"	3:55
11.	"Great Acceleration"	3:35
12.	"Liberation"	3:03

== Personnel ==
Musicians

- Grant-Lee Phillips – primary artist, guitar, vocals, producer
- Jerry Roe – drums
- Lex Price – bass

Production

- Mike Stankiewicz – engineer
- John Baldwin – mastering
- Nathan Golub – design
- Tucker Martine – mixing
