= Strangelet (album) =

Studio album by Grant-Lee Phillips
- Released: March 27, 2007
- Studios: Jupiter Studios, Seattle, Washington
- Genres: Indie rock; Americana
- Length: 47:24
- Label: Zoë Records
- Producer: Grant-Lee Phillips

Grant-Lee Phillips chronology
Nineteeneighties (2006)	Strangelet (2007)	Little Moon (2009)

Professional ratings
Aggregate scores
Source	Rating
Metacritic	76/100
Review scores
Source	Rating
AllMusic	4/5 stars
The A.V. Club	B+
PopMatters	5/10
The Skinny	4/5 stars

Strangelet is the fifth studio album by American singer-songwriter Grant-Lee Phillips. It was released on March 27, 2007, under Zoë Records.

== Critical reception ==
Strangelet was met with "generally favorable" reviews from critics. At Metacritic, which assigns a weighted average rating out of 100 to reviews from mainstream publications, this release received an average score of 73, based on 10 reviews. Aggregator Album of the Year gave the release a 73 out of 100 based on a critical consensus of 5 reviews.

Mark Deming of AllMusic noted that Phillip's vocals on the album are "rich and satisfying", while saying "the core of this album is built around a tight and modest rhythm section, but the string and horn arrangements which adorn several tracks add a welcome luster to the melodies which dovetail beautifully with Phillips' voice."

== Track listing ==
All tracks are written by Grant-Lee Phillips.

No.	Title	Length
1.	"Runaway"	3:47
2.	"Soft Asylum (No Way Out)"	5:03
3.	"Fountain of Youth"	3:49
4.	"Hidden Hand"	3:36
5.	"Dream in Color"	4:26
6.	"Chain Lightning"	3:48
7.	"Raise The Spirit"	4:59
8.	"Same Blue Devils"	3:32
9.	"Killing a Dead Man"	3:50
10.	"Johnny Guitar"	3:43
11.	"Return To Love"	3:08
12.	"So Much"	3:43

== Personnel ==
- Grant-Lee Phillips – primary artist, guitar, producer
- Bill Rieflin – drums
- Peter Buck – guitar
- Daphne Chen – violin
- Eric Gorfain – violin
- Richard Dodd – cello
- Leah Katz – viola
- Stephanie O'Keefe – French horn

== Chart ==
Chart performance for Strangelet
Chart (2007)	Peak position
US Heatseekers Albums (Billboard)	44
