= Peter Wolfe =

Peter Wolfe may refer to:

- Peter Wolfe (musician) (born 1968), British musician and poet
- Peter Wolfe (sports rankings), owner of a computer system that ranks college football teams
- Peter Wolfe, character in Alias Nick Beal
- Peter Wolfe, character in Rocko's Modern Life

== See also ==
- Peter Wolf (disambiguation)
- Peter Wolff (disambiguation)
