= Peter and the Wolf (disambiguation) =

Peter and the Wolf is a 1936 composition by Sergei Prokofiev, which has been often performed, recorded and adapted.

Peter and the Wolf may also refer to:

== Books ==
- Peter and the Wolf (short story), a short story from Angela Carter's anthology Black Venus (1985)
- Peter and the Wolf, a picture book adapted and illustrated by Chris Raschka

== Film and TV ==
- Peter and the Wolf (1946 film), Disney's animated version narrated by Sterling Holloway
- Peter & the Wolf (2006 film), an animated film directed by Suzie Templeton
- Peter and the Wolf (TV special), a 1995 animated television special directed by George Daugherty

== Music ==
- Peter and the Wolf (band), a band from Austin, Texas

=== Albums ===
- David Bowie Narrates Prokofiev's Peter and the Wolf, a 1978 album by David Bowie which includes narration by Bowie
- Peter & the Wolf (Jimmy Smith album), 1966
- Peter and the Wolf (1975 rock album), narrated by Vivian Stanshall
- Peter and the Wolf ("Weird Al" Yankovic and Wendy Carlos album), 1988
- Petr & the Wulf, album by Munly and the Lupercalians
- Wolf Tracks and Peter and the Wolf, a 2005 album by Jean-Pascal Beintus
