= Peter Wolff (disambiguation) =

Peter Wolff (born 1946) was a politician.

Peter Wolff may also refer to:

- Peter Wolff (actor) (1911–1978), German actor
- Peter A. Wolff (1923–2013), American physicist
- Peter Wolff Trust Supports the John Whiting Award

== See also ==
- Peter Wolfe (disambiguation)
- Peter Wolf (disambiguation)
