= Little Moon (album) =

Studio album by Grant-Lee Phillips
- Released: October 13, 2009
- Recorded: May 4–8, 2009
- Studios: Stampede Origin, Los Angeles, California, US
- Length: 44:25
- Language: English
- Label: Yep Roc
- Producer: Paul Bryan

Grant-Lee Phillips chronology
Strangelet (2007)	Little Moon (2009)	Walking in the Green Corn (2012)

Little Moon is a 2009 studio album by American singer-songwriter Grant-Lee Phillips. It has received positive reviews from critics.

== Reception ==
Editors at AllMusic rated this album 4 out of 5 stars, with critic James Christopher Monger writing that "Phillips draws the bulk of his material out of the positive vibes of new fatherhood" with an album that has various genres and moods, but "all signature Grant Lee Phillips". In American Songwriter, Peter Gerstenzang rated Little Moon 4 out of 5 stars, calling it Phillips' strongest album. Stephen Rylance of PopMatters gave this release a 5 out of 10, stating that this album gives glimpses of how good Phillips can be but the inconsistent quality between tracks results in a middling album that "sees a lack of imagination and an over-reliance on hackneyed musical and lyrical phrases threatening to eclipse Grant-Lee Phillips’ indubitable talent".

Online retailer iTunes named this Best Singer/Songwriter Album of 2009. "Strangest Thing" was highlighted as Song of the Day by NPR, where Barbara Mitchell called it "an ode to optimism".

== Track listing ==
All songs written by Grant-Lee Phillips.

1. "Good Morning Happiness" – 2:48
2. "Strangest Thing" – 4:08
3. "Little Moon" – 4:19
4. "It Ain't the Old Cold War Harry" – 3:41
5. "Seal It with a Kiss" – 3:46
6. "Nightbirds" – 3:15
7. "Violet" – 2:44
8. "Buried Treasure" – 4:26
9. "Blind Tom" – 2:57
10. "One Morning" – 4:52
11. "Older Now" – 3:18
12. "The Sun Shines on Jupiter" – 4:11

== Personnel ==
- Grant-Lee Phillips – 12-string guitar, acoustic guitar, baritone guitar, electric guitar, banjo, vocals
- Sebastian Aymanns – percussion
- Jay Bellerose – drums, percussion
- Paul Bryan – bass guitar ("Seal It with a Kiss", "One Morning", and "The Sun Shines on Jupiter"), backing vocals ("Seal It with a Kiss", "One Morning", and "The Sun Shines on Jupiter"), horn arrangements, string arrangements, production
- Daphne Chen – violin
- Richard Dodd – cello
- Jamie Edwards – clavinet, keyboards, Moog synthesizer, Hammond organ, piano, Wurlitzer, backing vocals ("Seal It with a Kiss", "One Morning", and "The Sun Shines on Jupiter")
- Alma Fernandez – viola
- Ryan Freeland – audio engineering, mixing
- Eric Gorfain – violin
- Gavin Lurssen – audio mastering
- Denise Siegel – backing vocals ("The Sun Shines on Jupiter"), art conception, photography
- Jason Thor – trombone, bass trombone, tuba
- Michael Triplett – layout design

== See also ==
- 2009 in American music
- List of 2009 albums
