= Nineteeneighties =

Studio album by Grant-Lee Phillips
- Released: June 27, 2006
- Studios: Magnetic Field Recordings; Your Place or Mine Studios (Glendale)
- Genres: Rock, folk
- Length: 43:54
- Label: Zoë
- Producer: Grant-Lee Phillips

Grant-Lee Phillips chronology
Virginia Creeper (2004)	Nineteeneighties (2006)	Strangelet (2007)

Nineteeneighties is the fourth studio album by American singer-songwriter Grant-Lee Phillips. The album consists of cover songs of college rock bands synonymous with the 1980s. It was released on June 27, 2006, under Zoë Records.

== Production ==
The bulk of the album was recorded at Grant-Lee Phillips' personal studio, Magnetic Fields Recordings, with Phillips performing most of the instruments. David J. Carpenter, a collaborator of John Doe and Gregory Page, and Kevin Jarvis, drummer on several Steve Wynn solo albums, performed on four tracks each, while The Section Quartet founder Eric Gorfain appeared on a single recording.

== Critical reception ==
Professional ratings
Aggregate scores
Source	Rating
Metacritic	75/100
Review scores
Source	Rating
AllMusic	3.5/5 stars
MusicOMH	4/5 stars

Nineteeneighties was met with "generally favorable" reviews from critics. At Metacritic, which assigns a weighted average rating out of 100 to reviews from mainstream publications, this release received an average score of 75, based on 10 reviews. Aggregator Album of the Year gave the release a 73 out of 100 based on a critical consensus of 5 reviews.

In a review for Slant Magazine, Preston Jones awarded the album three out of five stars and complimented "Age of Consent" as a "particular beauty". For NPR, Stephen Thompson wrote "it's surprising how smoothly these tributes fit into his homespun, heartfelt catalog." Michael Metivier, writing for PopMatters, positively compared Nineteeneighties to The Covers Record by Cat Power, believing Phillips' interpretations had an "identifiable purpose". Mark Deming of AllMusic called Phillips' arrangements "measured and atmospheric", continuing with "Phillips reaches into the material with an obvious love and respect, and he finds a beautifully melancholy essence". Billboard critic Joshua Klein commended Phillips for not leaning into the "giddy 80s excess" and instead focused on "the explosion of creativity inspired by punk and new wave" of the 1980s. For The Sunday Times, Mike Edwards praised the renditions of "Boys Don't Cry", "So Central Rain", and "Last Night I Dreamt Somebody Loved Me", but said "the dreamy pace can occasionally become soporific".

== Track listing ==
No.	Title	Writer(s)	Original artist(s)	Length
1.	"Wave of Mutilation"	Black Francis	Pixies	3:36
2.	"Age of Consent"	Gillian Lesley Gilbert, Peter Hook, Stephen Paul David Morris, Bernard Sumner	New Order	3:34
3.	"The Eternal"	Ian Curtis, Hook, Morris, Summer	Joy Division	5:15
4.	"I Often Dream of Trains"	Robyn Hitchcock	Robyn Hitchcock	3:20
5.	"The Killing Moon"	Pete Louis Vincent de Freitas, Ian Stephen McCulloch, Leslie Thomas Pattinson	Echo & the Bunnymen	4:14
6.	"Love My Way"	John Gez Ashton, Richard Lofthouse Butler, Timothy George Butler, Vincent Ely	The Psychedelic Furs	4:33
7.	"Under the Milky Way"	Karin Jansson, Steve Kilbey	The Church	4:29
8.	"City of Refuge"	Nick Cave	Nick Cave	3:36
9.	"So. Central Rain"	William Thomas Berry, Peter Lawrence Buck, Michael E. Mills, John Michael Stipe	R.E.M.	3:24
10.	"Boys Don't Cry"	Michael Dempsey, Robert Smith, Laurence Tolhurst	The Cure	3:46
11.	"Last Night I Dreamt That Somebody Loved Me"	Morrissey, Johnny Marr	The Smiths	4:07

== Personnel ==
Musicians

- Grant-Lee Phillips - vocals, six and twelve-string acoustic and electric guitars, electric bass, piano, organ, harmonium, toy piano, mellotron, Wurlitzer, baritone guitar, baritone ukulele, mandolin, harmonica, hand percussion, programming, loopage
- Kevin Jarvis - drums on "Age of Consent", "The Killing Moon", "Love My Way", and "City of Refuge"
- David J. Carpenter - upright bass on "Wave of Mutilation", "Age of Consent", "I Often Dream of Trains", "Love My Way", and "City of Refuge"
- Eric Gorfain - violin on "Love My Way"

Production

- Grant-Lee Phillips - producer, recording, mixing, art, layout
- Mark Linett - recording and mixing on "Love My Way"
- Dave Schultz - mastering
- Thomas Manzi - management
- Steven Jurgensmeyer - layout
- Denise Siegel - photography
