= Clover-Lynn =

American bluegrass musician

- Born: Franklin County, Virginia, U.S.
- Genres: gothic country bluegrass
- Occupations: Musician; TikToker
- Instruments: banjo
- Years active: 2019–present

TikTok information
- Page: hillbillygothic
- Followers: 303.3K
- Last updated: October 27, 2024

Clover-Lynn, also known as hillbillygothic, is an American bluegrass and gothic country musician and TikToker. She is the banjoist of the band Clover-Lynn and The Hellfires.

== Biography ==
Clover-Lynn grew up in rural Franklin County, Virginia. Her family has lived in the Appalachia region of the Virginian Blue Ridge Mountains for over two-hundred years. She was raised in the Baptist tradition.

Clover-Lynn grew up listening to country and bluegrass music, citing The Stanley Brothers, Flatt and Scruggs, and Rhiannon Giddens as early influences. She worked in the tech industry on the west coast before moving back to Virginia to pursue a career in music. She is the lead of the band Clover-Lynn and the Hellfires, formerly called the Laurel Hells Ramblers. In 2024, she performed at the Floyd Country Store music venue in Floyd County, Virginia.

Clover-Lynn amassed a large following on the social media platforms TikTok and Instagram, under the username hillbillygothic, where she posts videos of herself playing the banjo and combatting misognyist and anti-LGBTQ content.

She is a transgender woman and part of the goth subculture.
