= Grant-Lee Phillips =

American musician

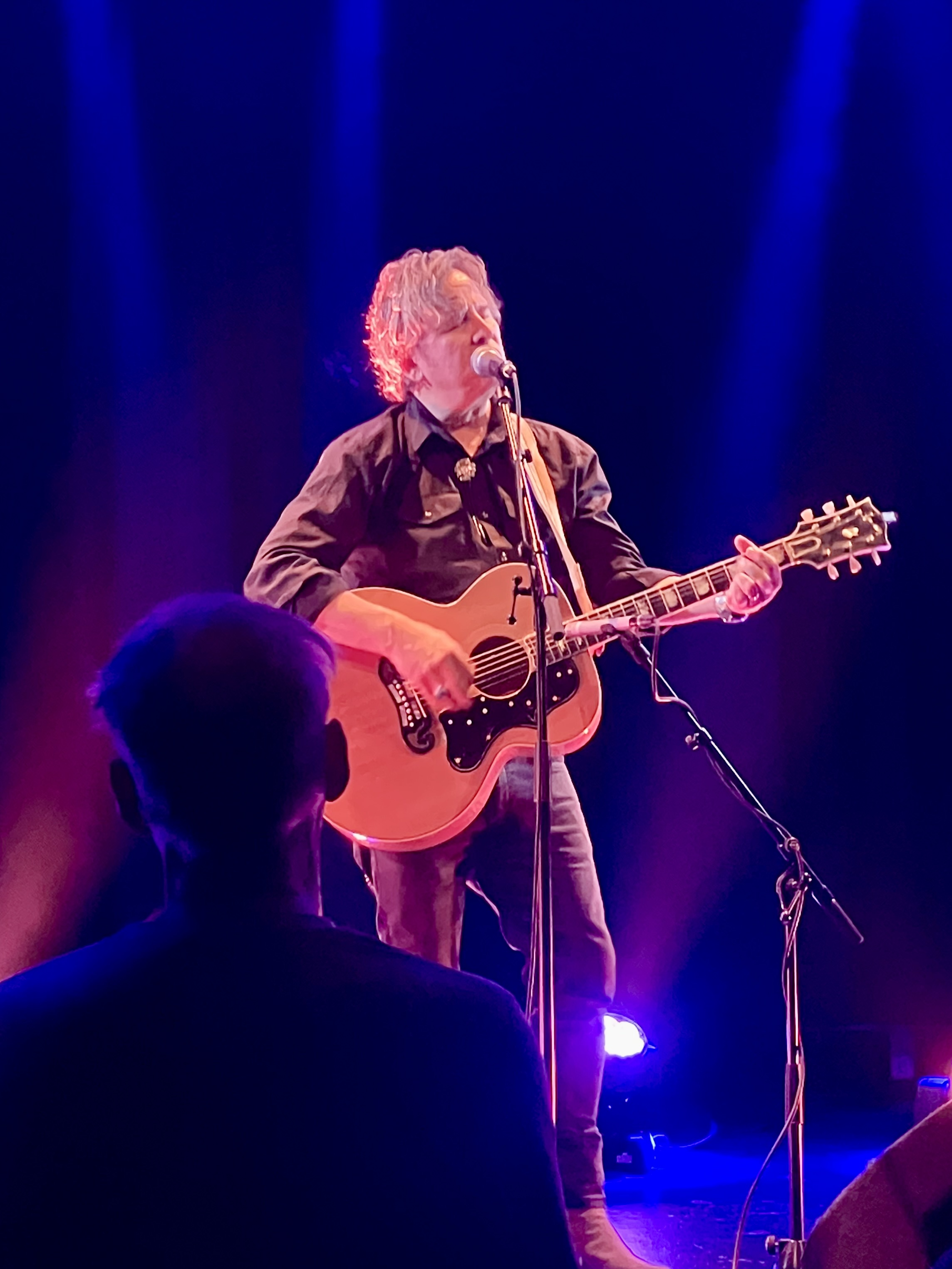
- Phillips in 2023

Background information
- Born: Bryan G. Phillips; September 1, 1963 (age 63); Stockton, California, U.S.
- Genres: Rock, alternative rock, folk, Americana, indie, country rock
- Instruments: vocals, acoustic guitar, electric guitar, bass, banjo, mandolin, harmonica, drums, piano, synthesizer
- Years active: 1987–present
- Labels: Yep Roc Records, Rounder Records
- Website: GrantLeePhillips.com

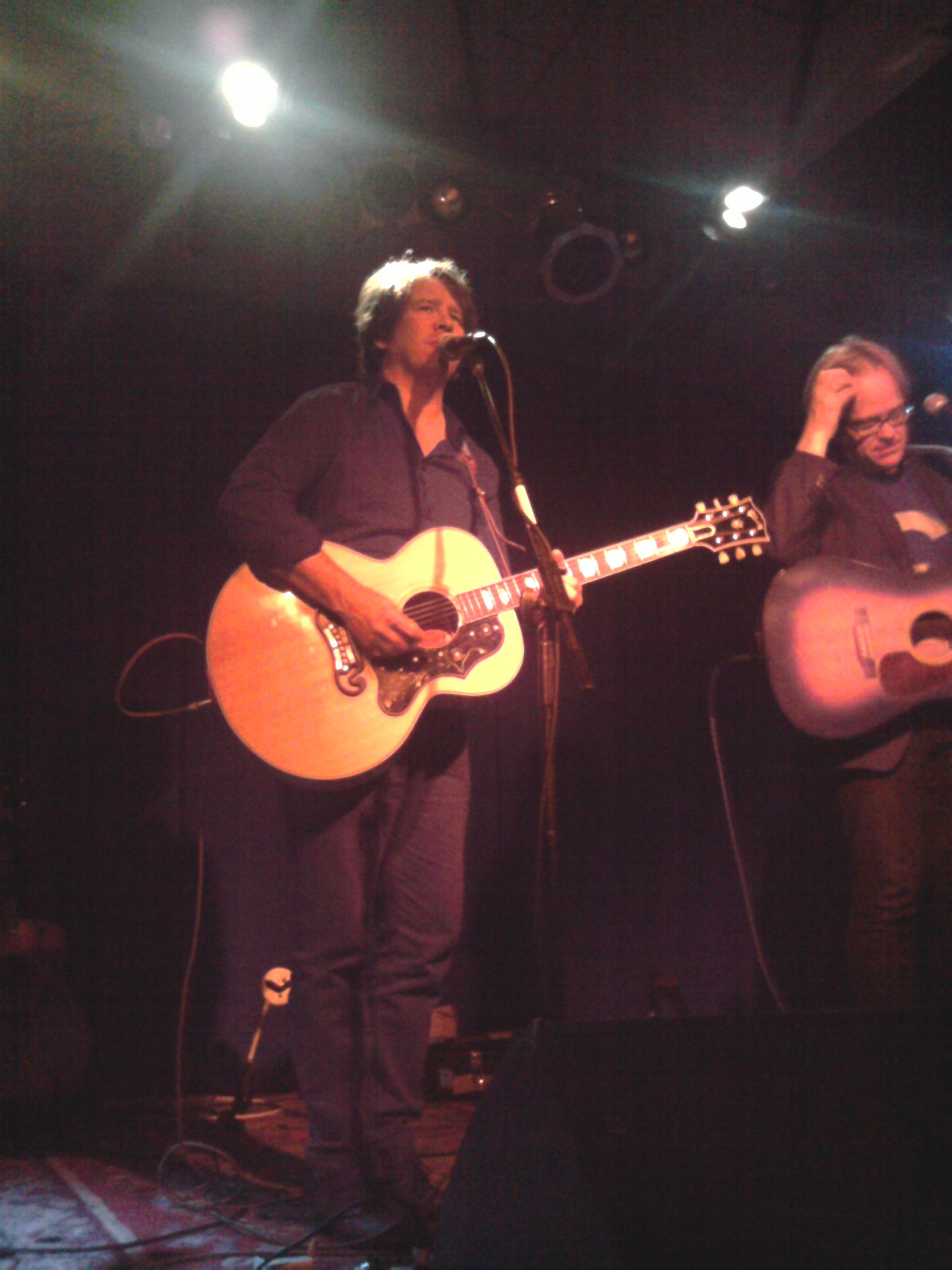
Grant-Lee Phillips at Jammin' Java in Vienna, VA, November 20, 2009

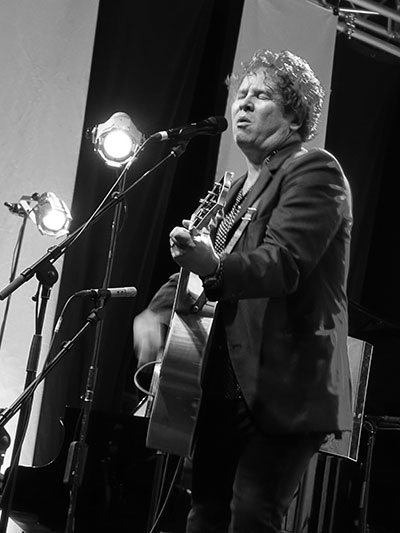
Grant-Lee Phillips (2015)

Grant-Lee Phillips (born Bryan G. Phillips; September 1, 1963) is an American singer-songwriter and multi-instrumentalist. He led the group Grant Lee Buffalo in the 1990s before launching a solo career. He is also known for his recurring role as the town troubadour in the television series Gilmore Girls.

== Background ==
Born in Stockton, California, Phillips began playing the guitar in his early teens. At age 19, he moved to Los Angeles where he worked tarring roofs to fund evening classes at UCLA and forming bands. He eventually dropped out of college to pursue music, and linked up with an old friend from Stockton, Jeffrey Clark. He lived on campus at CalArts with future wife Denise Siegel, whom he met at a party. Phillips informally took art classes, went to public lectures and film screenings, and immersed himself in the school's World Music program until 1990.

In the late 1980s, Phillips joined the band Shiva Burlesque, which released two LPs, Shiva Burlesque (Nate Starkman & Son; 1987) and Mercury Blues (Fundamental; 1990). When Shiva Burlesque was disbanded in 1990, some members of the band continued playing together to form Grant Lee Buffalo.

== Grant Lee Buffalo ==
Following those handful of solo shows at clubs around Hollywood, Phillips recruited ex-Shiva members Joey Peters (drums) and Paul Kimble (bass) for rehearsals as Grant Lee Buffalo in mid-1991. Phillips was now writing lyrics as well as music, and the trio quickly built up a local following, selling out clubs on the strength of Phillips's intense performance. His political storytelling was delivered in a recently discovered voice: both a soaring falsetto and a drawl that matched his aggressive acoustic guitar stomp and pouting physicality. One song, "Fuzzy", was released on Bob Mould's Singles Only label in 1992 to critical praise and led to Grant Lee Buffalo being signed to Slash Records. The debut LP, also called Fuzzy, was released a year later, upon which Michael Stipe of R.E.M. declared it "the best album of the year hands down". In 1995 Grant-Lee Phillips was named the critics’ choice for Best Male Vocalist of 1995.

A further three Grant Lee Buffalo albums followed: Mighty Joe Moon (1994), Copperopolis (1996), and Jubilee (1998). A live performance of Mighty Joe Moon's title track is available online from the South by Southwest festival. Though all were heavily promoted through concert touring, they never escaped cult status. Phillips disbanded the band in early 1999.

== Solo career ==
Phillips launched his solo career in 2000. signed to the Boston-based indie label Rounder Records and launched a solo career, issuing Ladies' Love Oracle online in 2000. The recording was later more widely released. His first full-length album, Mobilize, was released in 2001. Being praised as much for its gentleness as Buffalo were for their rock, it featured Phillips on many instruments.

During a short tour with Robyn Hitchcock, Phillips co-produced and co-starred in a concert film of the tour shot in Seattle titled Elixirs & Remedies, directed by Kris Kristensen. Kristensen would later direct the video for "The Sun Shines on Jupiter", from Phillips' solo release "Little Moon".

In 2004, Virginia Creeper arrived and with it a more folky, almost country record noted for its complete absence of electric guitar. In 2006 Phillips released another acoustic album, Nineteeneighties. A set of cover versions, it featured songs from The Smiths, Pixies, New Order, Robyn Hitchcock, R.E.M., The Church, and Echo & the Bunnymen. A new record of his own material, Strangelet, was released on March 27, 2007. On October 13, 2009, Grant released "Little Moon" on Yep Roc records. In October 2012, "Walking in the Green Corn" was released, partially funded by fans through a PledgeMusic campaign. Phillips toured with Glen Phillips to support the album.

- Grant-Lee Phillips member of the Muscogee Nation (on his mother's side) and a direct descendant of those who walked the Trail of Tears.
- Phillips is related to Chief John Ross on his father's side. Paternally he is of both Blackfoot and Cherokee ancestry.
- Phillips has been married for more than 20 years. He became a father to Violet Thea Phillips, January 11, 2008.
- Phillips has scored several films and TV shows as well as having a recurring role as the town troubadour on the 2000–2007 TV series Gilmore Girls and its follow-up miniseries in 2016.
- Phillips has a comedic background, having been a cast member in high school of the only professional theater in Stockton, Pollardville.
- Phillips has co-written songs with numerous people, most recently with comedian Margaret Cho. He can be seen featured in her video "Asian Adjacent." The song was partially inspired by Phillips and Jemaine Clement (of Flight of the Conchords), who is part Māori.

In 2016, Phillips released The Narrows, which extends Phillips' exploration of roots and folk music. He has continued to be prolific, releasing Widdershins (2018), Lightning, Show Us Your Stuff (2020), Yuletide (2021), All That You Can Dream (2022), and In the Hour of Dust (2025).

== Discography ==
| Year | Album |
|---|---|
| 2000 | Ladies' Love Oracle |
| 2001 | Mobilize |
| 2004 | Virginia Creeper |
| 2006 | nineteeneighties |
| 2007 | Strangelet |
| 2009 | Little Moon |
| 2012 | Walking in the Green Corn |
| 2016 | The Narrows |
| 2018 | Widdershins |
| 2020 | Lightning, Show Us Your Stuff |
| 2021 | Yuletide |
| 2022 | All That You Can Dream |
| 2025 | In the Hour of Dust |

=== Compilation appearances ===
- I. C. Independent Celebration, Vol. 1 (2015, Birdstone Records) (song: "Buffalo Hearts")
