= Mobilize (Grant-Lee Phillips album) =

Studio album by Grant-Lee Phillips
- Released: July 24, 2001
- Genres: Indie rock, folk
- Label: Rounder
- Producers: Grant-Lee Phillips, Carmen Rizzo

Grant-Lee Phillips chronology
Ladies Love Oracle (2000)	Mobilize (2001)	Virginia Creeper (2004)

Professional ratings
Review scores
Source	Rating
AllMusic	Review

Mobilize is the second album by Grant-Lee Phillips after the internet release of Ladies Love Oracle. It was released to high critical acclaim, reviews often focusing on the successful implementation of both electronic textures and traditional instruments. Phillips himself played every instrument during recording and used a drum machine for percussion in every track except for "Hugo's Theme" and "Sunday Best" where other musicians contributed.

== Track listing ==
All tracks composed by Grant-Lee Phillips

1. "See America" 5:08
2. "Humankind" 3:09
3. "Love's a Mystery" 4:09
4. "Sadness Soot" 4:20
5. "We All Get a Taste" 3:54
6. "Spring Released" 3:15
7. "Lazily Drowning" 4:18
8. "Like a Lover" 4:31
9. "Mobilize" 4:07
10. "Beautiful Dreamers" 4:27
11. "Sleepless Lake" 2:50
12. "April Chimes" 2:46

Australian edition bonus tracks

13. "Hugo's Theme" 0:46
14. "Sunday Best" 3:28
