= Petr & the Wulf =

Petr & The Wulf
- Cover art for Petr & The Wulf

Studio album by Munly & The Lupercalians
- Released: Aug. 2010 (CD); Oct. 2010 (LP)
- Studio: Absinthe Studios
- Genre: Folk; Southern Gothic
- Length: 47:45 (CD); 46:45 (LP)
- Label: Alternative Tentacles
- Producer: Bob Ferbrache

Munly & The Lupercalians chronology
Petr & The Wulf (2010)	Kinnery of Lupercalia: Undelivered Legion (2022)

Petr & The Wulf is the debut studio album by Munly & The Lupercalians, a side project founded by musician Jay Munly around 2007. A concept album, it is a loose adaptation of Peter and the Wolf by Sergei Prokofiev.

It was released on compact disc on August 31, 2010 (Note: Bandcamp mislabeled Petr & The Wulf as a self-titled album. Munly & The Lupercalians have never released a self-titled album.) and on vinyl on October 5, 2010 through the record label Alternative Tentacles.

== Composition ==
=== Adaptation ===
The album is a mythicized retelling of the original 1936 composition, told from different characters' perspectives: the boy ("Petr"), his grandfather ("Grandfater"), the hunters ("Three Wise Hunters"), and the animals: "Cat", "Bird", "Duk", and "Wulf". "Scarewulf" serves as a synopsis, or introduction, to the album's story. It is believed that Munly chose the Russian spelling of the track titles in homage to Prokofiev's original story.

As told to Sad Wave, a Russian publication, Munly has been fascinated with the story ever since he was a child:

“This story - both music and the plot - sunk into my soul as a child, after the [Disney] cartoon that we were shown in elementary school. I think she greatly influenced me. And I wanted to make my version of this story - the true version."

Similarly, the press release informs the listener that "'Petr & The Wulf' is the correct telling of a story about which most have been woefully misinformed."

=== The Kinnery of Lupercalia ===
Ultimately, it is a prequel to the stories of his invented world, Lupercalia, told over a span of four albums. The goal is to produce a multi-album epic titled 'The Kinnery of Lupercalia', which is all about the town and its colorful residents. Its residents have been described as "families who interact with each other" and Lupercalia as an "imagined community of Legions & clans where we are not sure who is a deity and who is not." A "Pre-History of Lupercalia" was originally posted on the band's MySpace page as a blog post, but the page itself has been deleted.

== Recording and production ==
Although a demo album was released in 2009, this is considered to be the first release by the band. It is the sixth studio album by Munly overall.

It was recorded, mixed, and produced by Bob Ferbrache at Absinthe Studios in Denver, Colorado.

== Packaging and release ==
=== CD & LP editions ===
The Alternative Tentacles category number is VIRUS 421.

The vinyl album was originally pressed by Rainbo Records. The matrix/runout numbers are S-73499 VIRUS-421-A and S-73500 VIRUS-421-B. The vinyl edition of the album included special artwork and a "Pre-History of Lupercalia."

The album was re-released through the band's own independent record label, SCAC Unincorporated, around 2015. (Note: MyShopify mislabeled Petr & The Wulf as a self-titled album. Munly & The Lupercalians have never released a self-titled album.)

=== Lyric booklet ===
In October 2019, band members Munly and Rebecca Vera collaborated with Devil's Jump Press to produce limited-edition lyric booklets for the album. The lyrics were handwritten by Munly with artwork crafted by Vera. A "Pre-History of Lupercalia" was also included. Only 32 copies were printed and distributed in total.

=== Other appearances ===
The song "Grandfater" was featured on the Smooch Records compilation album Radio 1190: Local Shakedown, Vol. 3 (2009) and on Rodentagogue: The Best of Dark Roots Music Volume II, released by Devil's Ruin Music in 2010.

== Critical reception ==
Reviews of the album were mixed.

Taipei Times' Taylor Briere praised the lyrics and instrumentation, giving the album a "deranged, circus-like feel and many wonderful musical moments".

Embo Blake of Hybrid Magazine called the music "weirdly irreverent" and compared the tone to that of the "dark and twisted" 2006 animated Peter & the Wolf film.

Maarten Schiethart of Penny Black Music, based in the UK, describes Munly as a "keen innovator" and the album full of "great ideas," although the backing band overshadowed the vocals.

The A.V. Club gave the album a B− rating. Matt Schild wrote that the album works on "an intellectual level" but found it "too easy to get tangled up in the narrative" and called the arrangements "overwhelmingly dismal".

Michael Cimaomo of the Valley Advocate echoed The A.V. Club, stating that the album overall is a "curious yet entrancing experience" but the lyrics are "overly verbose."

Writing for AllMusic, Ned Raggett gave the album 4 out of 5 stars, praising it as "an engaging, theatrical presentation that balances out haunted shadows with nervous energy", and wrote that the album sounded like it "really could soundtrack something spectacular."

== Track listing ==
All tracks are written by Munly J. Munly.

Standard edition (CD)
No.	Title	Length
1.	"Scarewulf"	5:02
2.	"Petr"	4:37
3.	"Grandfater"	5:37
4.	"Bird"	5:05
5.	"Cat"	6:33
6.	"Duk"	4:18
7.	"Three Wise Hunters"	8:18
8.	"Wulf"	8:11
Total length:		47:45

Vinyl edition (LP) - Side A: Sailors
No.	Title	Length
1.	"Scarewulf"	5:02
2.	"Petr"	4:38
3.	"Grandfater"	5:38
4.	"Three Wise Hunters"	8:18
Total length:		22:36

Vinyl edition (LP) - Side B: Animals
No.	Title	Length
1.	"Bird"	5:05
2.	"Cat"	6:34
3.	"Duk"	4:19
4.	"Wulf"	8:11
Total length:		24:09

== Personnel ==
Credits are adapted from the album liner notes.

=== Band members ===
- Munly J. Munly - vocals, banjo, lyrics
- Daniel "Danny Pants" Grandbois - keyboards
- Chad "Chadzilla" Johnson - drums, percussion
- Todd "The Peeler" Moore - drums, percussion
- Rebecca Vera - cello, keyboards

=== Production ===
- Robert Ferbrache - engineer
