= Copperopolis (album) =

Studio album by Grant Lee Buffalo
- Released: June 1996
- Studio: Cherokee, Los Angeles, California
- Genre: Rock
- Length: 56:03
- Label: Slash, Reprise
- Producer: Paul Kimble

Grant Lee Buffalo chronology
Mighty Joe Moon (1994)	Copperopolis (1996)	Jubilee (1998)

Copperopolis is the third studio album by alternative rock band Grant Lee Buffalo. It was released in 1996 on Slash Records.

== Production ==
The album was produced by bass player Paul Kimble. It was recorded in six weeks. All of the songs were written by Grant Lee Phillips.

== Critical reception ==
Professional ratings
Review scores
Source	Rating
AllMusic	3.5/5 stars
The Encyclopedia of Popular Music	3/5 stars
MusicHound Rock: The Essential Album Guide	4/5 stars

No Depression wrote that "the sound is lush and more beautiful than ever." Trouser Press wrote that "every song is a miniature epic" and that "the record confirms Phillips as a pop auteur." The Rough Guide to Rock called the album "triumphant," writing that it introduced "a richer, more sweeping sound."

== Track listing ==
All tracks composed by Grant Lee Phillips

1. "Homespun"
2. "The Bridge"
3. "Arousing Thunder"
4. "Even the Oxen"
5. "Crackdown"
6. "Armchair"
7. "Bethlehem Steel"
8. "All That I Have"
9. "Two & Two"
10. "Better for Us"
11. "Hyperion & Sunset"
12. "Comes to Blows"
13. "The Only Way Down"
