= Ladies Love Oracle =

Ladies' Love Oracle

Studio album by Grant-Lee Phillips
- Released: 2000
- Genres: Indie rock, folk
- Label: Magnetic Field
- Producer: Grant-Lee Phillips

Grant-Lee Phillips chronology
Ladies' Love Oracle (2000)	Mobilize (2001)

Ladies' Love Oracle is the first solo album by the American musician Grant-Lee Phillips, released in 2000.

== Critical reception ==
Professional ratings
Review scores
Source	Rating
AllMusic	3.5/5 stars

Rolling Stone noted "Phillips' spiderly weave of cowboy strum and ghost-house ivories and the natural sigh of his voice."

== Track listing ==
All tracks composed by Grant-Lee Phillips

1. "You're a Pony" – 2:05
2. "Heavenly" – 2:24
3. "Squint" – 3:36
4. "Don't Look Down" – 4:40
5. "Flamin' Shoe" – 3:53
6. "Folding" – 3:32
7. "Lonesome Serenade" – 3:24
8. "Nothin' Is for Sure" – 4:30
9. "St. Expedite" – 3:00
10. "Snowflakes" – 5:40 (found only on 2002 re-release of the album)
