= Gothic country =

Genre of country music

- Other names: Gothic Americana; Southern Gothic; the Denver sound; dark country
- Stylistic origins: Country; gothic rock; post-punk; gospel; Americana; jazz
- Cultural origins: Late 1990s – early 2000s, Denver, Colorado
- Typical instruments: Vocals; guitar; bass; banjo; mandolin; fiddle; cello; drums

Local scenes
- Denver

Other topics
- Artists; alternative country; neofolk; gothic rock; gothabilly; Gothic Western; cowpunk

Gothic country (sometimes referred to as gothic Americana, Southern Gothic, the Denver sound, or dark country) is a genre of country music rooted in early jazz, gospel, Americana, gothic rock, and post-punk. Its lyrics focus on dark subject matters. The genre has a regional scene in Denver.

== History ==
Gothic country is rooted in early jazz, gospel, country, Americana, gothic rock, and post-punk. The genre's lyrics focus on macabre and grim subject matters. J.D. Wilkes, frontman of the band Legendary Shack Shakers, described gothic country as "[taking] an angle that there's something grotesque and beautiful in the traditions of the South, the backdrop of Southern living."

Slim Cessna's Auto Club, formed in 1992, often deals with lyrical themes derived from apocalyptic religious imagery, applying a gothic lyrical approach to country and gospel songs, although the band has denied that their songs are gothic. The following year, the gothic country group the Handsome Family formed; Andy Fyfe of Mojo called them "Americana's ghostly Sonny & Cher." A.V. Club reviewer Christopher Bahn compared their music to "a collaboration between Hank Williams and Edgar Allan Poe."

Johnny Cash's American Recordings series, produced by Rick Rubin, a producer best known for working with hip hop and heavy metal artists, was described as having a gothic country sound and image; amidst covers of songs by non-country artists such as Depeche Mode, Danzig and Nine Inch Nails, as well as traditional and World War II-era songs, Cash's album series lyrically derived from haunting, despaired themes such as death, and recurring religious themes in the form of dark gospel recordings.

Pioneered by David Eugene Edwards through his band 16 Horsepower (and later, Wovenhand), a regional gothic country scene developed in Denver. Ethel Cain's music has been described as "Southern Gothic Pop."

== See also ==
- List of gothic country artists
