= Anglo concertina =

Musical instrument

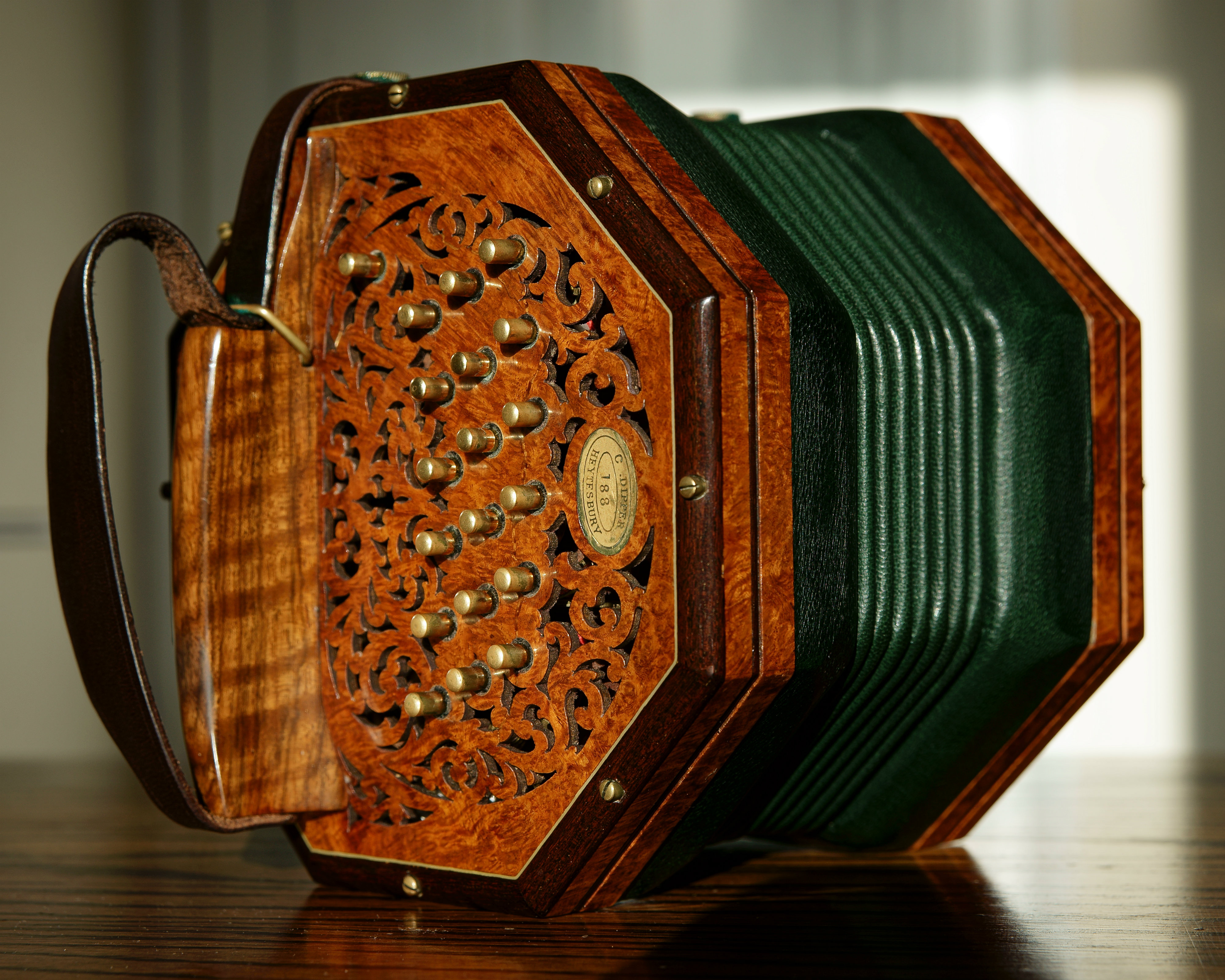
A 37 key Anglo concertina manufactured by Colin and Rosalie Dipper.

The Anglo or Anglo-German concertina is a member of the concertina family of free-reed instruments.

== History ==
The Anglo originated as a hybrid between the English and German concertinas. The button layouts are generally the same as the original 20-button German concertinas designed by Carl Friedrich Uhlig in 1834. Within a few years of that date, the German concertina was a popular import in England, Ireland, and North America, due to its ease of use and relatively low price. English manufacturers responded to this popularity by offering their own versions using traditional English methods: concertina reeds instead of long-plate reeds, independent pivots for each button, and hexagon-shaped ends.

Initially the term Anglo-German only applied to concertinas of this type built in England, but as German manufacturers adopted some of these techniques, the term came to apply to all concertinas that used Uhlig's 20-button system.

== Play ==
The heart of the Anglo system consists of two 10-button rows, each of which produces a diatonic major scale in a pattern devised around 1826 by Bohemian designer Joseph Richter for use in a harmonica (Richter tuning). Five buttons of each row are on each side. The two rows are musically a fifth apart. For example, if the row closest to the player's wrist is in the key of G, the next outer row is in the key of C below. An advantage of the Richter tuning is that pressing three adjacent notes in one row produces a major triad. Also, because the travel direction inverts as you progress up the scale, at the point where the scale crosses from one side of the concertina to the other octaves can be played in the home keys

A third row of extra notes was eventually added, loosely derived from the C♯ scale. These added accidentals and notes that already existed in the diatonic rows, but in opposite bisonoric orientation, to make additional chords possible and certain melodic passages easier. At this point the instrument was chromatic over two octaves, but not every chord or other note combination was available in either push or draw. There is little variation between makers and models in the layout of the notes in the core diatonic rows, but somewhat more variation in the number and layout of the 'helper' notes. The two most common layouts of this 30-button variety are the Jeffries and Lachenal systems. Layouts with 36, 38 and 40 buttons are not uncommon, and a few anglos have as many as 55 keys (such as the one John Spiers plays). Instruments in the key of C/G are most typical. Other key combinations are also available—G/D and B♭/F being the most common alternatives. B♭/F and A♭/E♭ were popular with the Salvation Army.

The Anglo concertina is typically held by placing the hands through a leather strap, with the thumbs outside the strap and the palms resting on wooden bars. This arrangement leaves four fingers of each hand free for playing, and the thumbs free to operate an air valve (for expanding or contracting the bellows without sounding a note) or a drone. Anglo concertinas are often associated with the music of Ireland, though they are also used in other musical contexts, particularly in music for the English Morris dance and Boeremusiek. Famous English players of the Anglo include Scan Tester, John Spiers, William Kimber, and John Kirkpatrick.

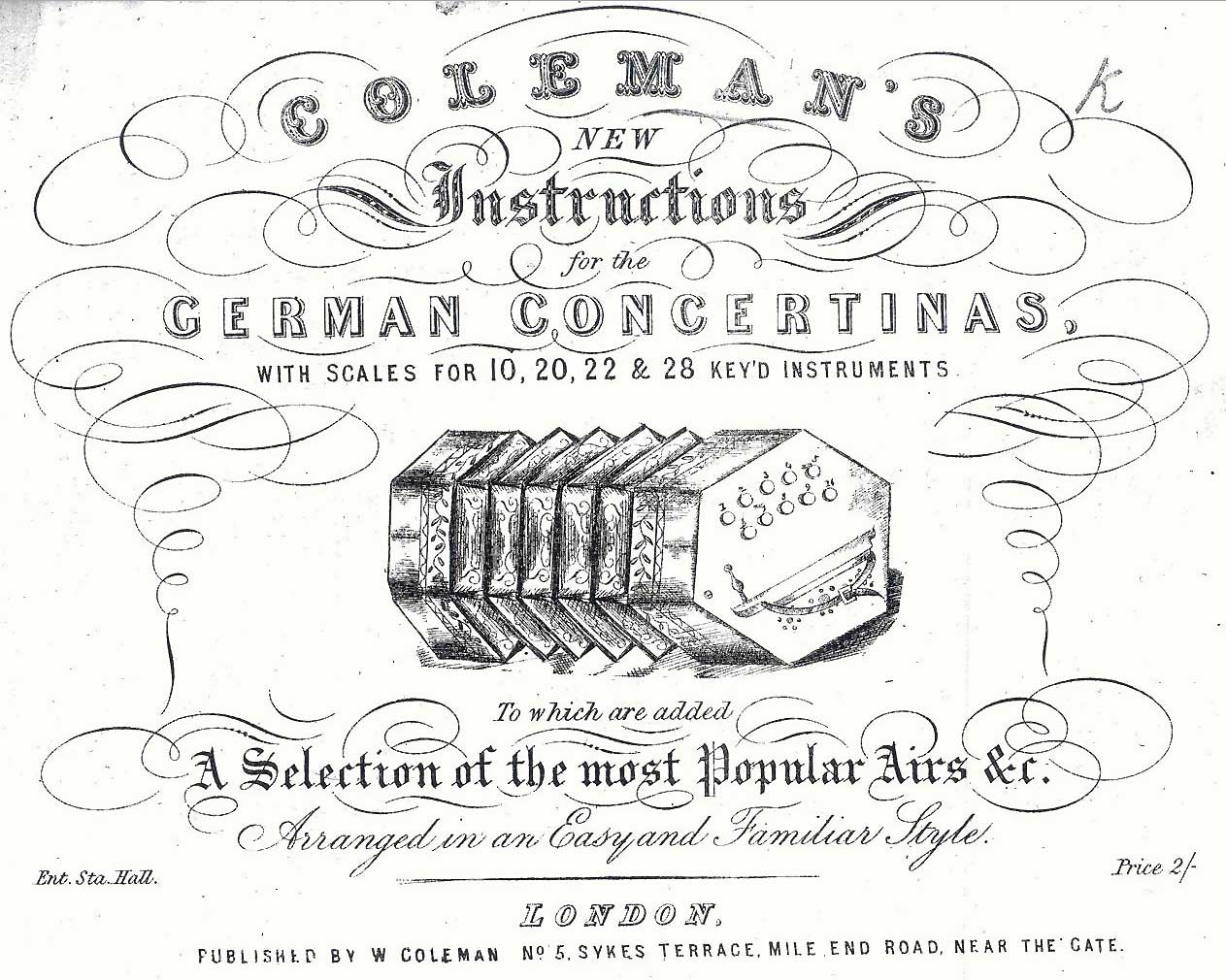
1854 London

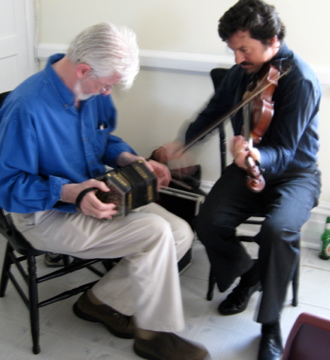
sitting

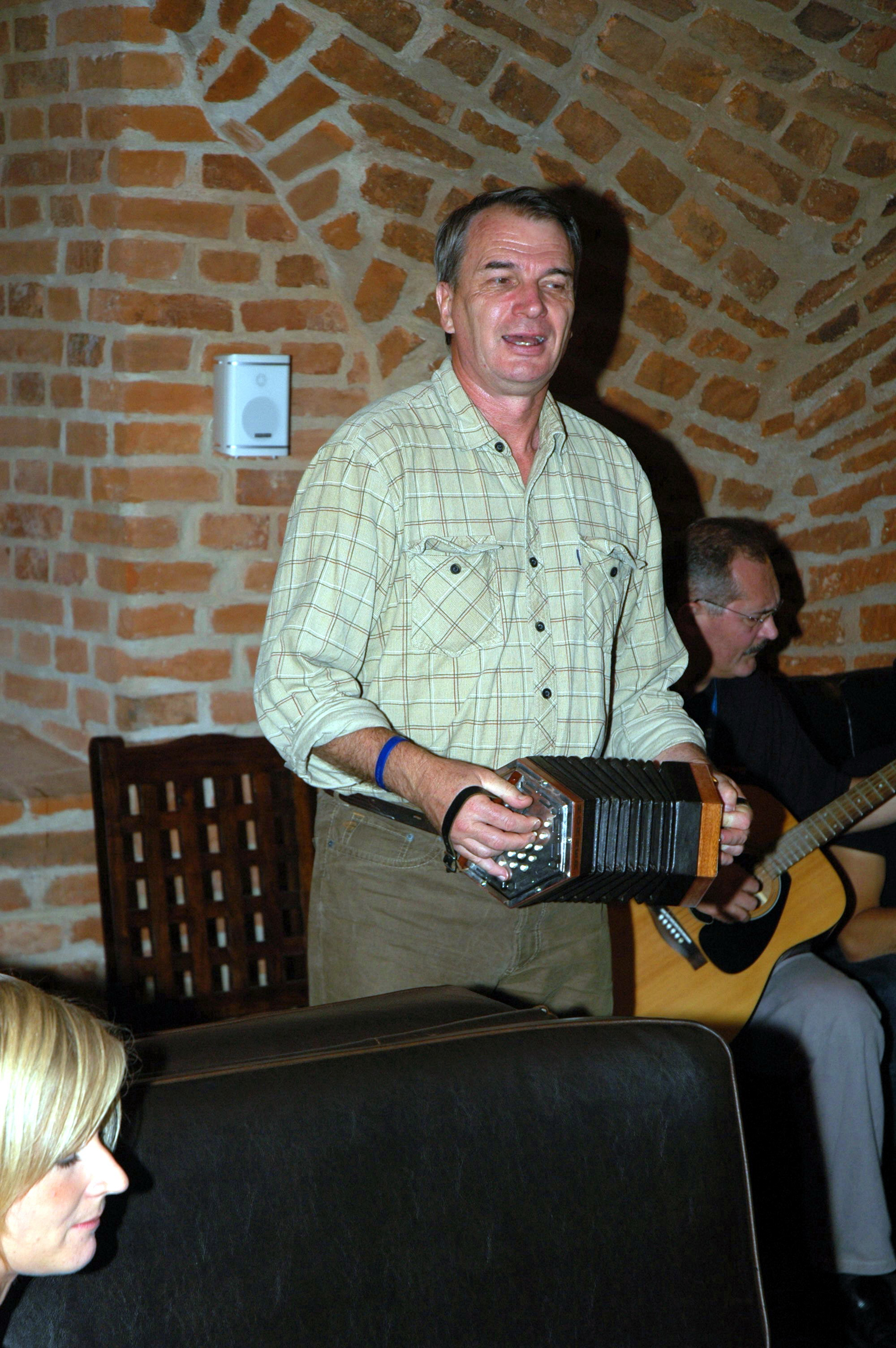
standing

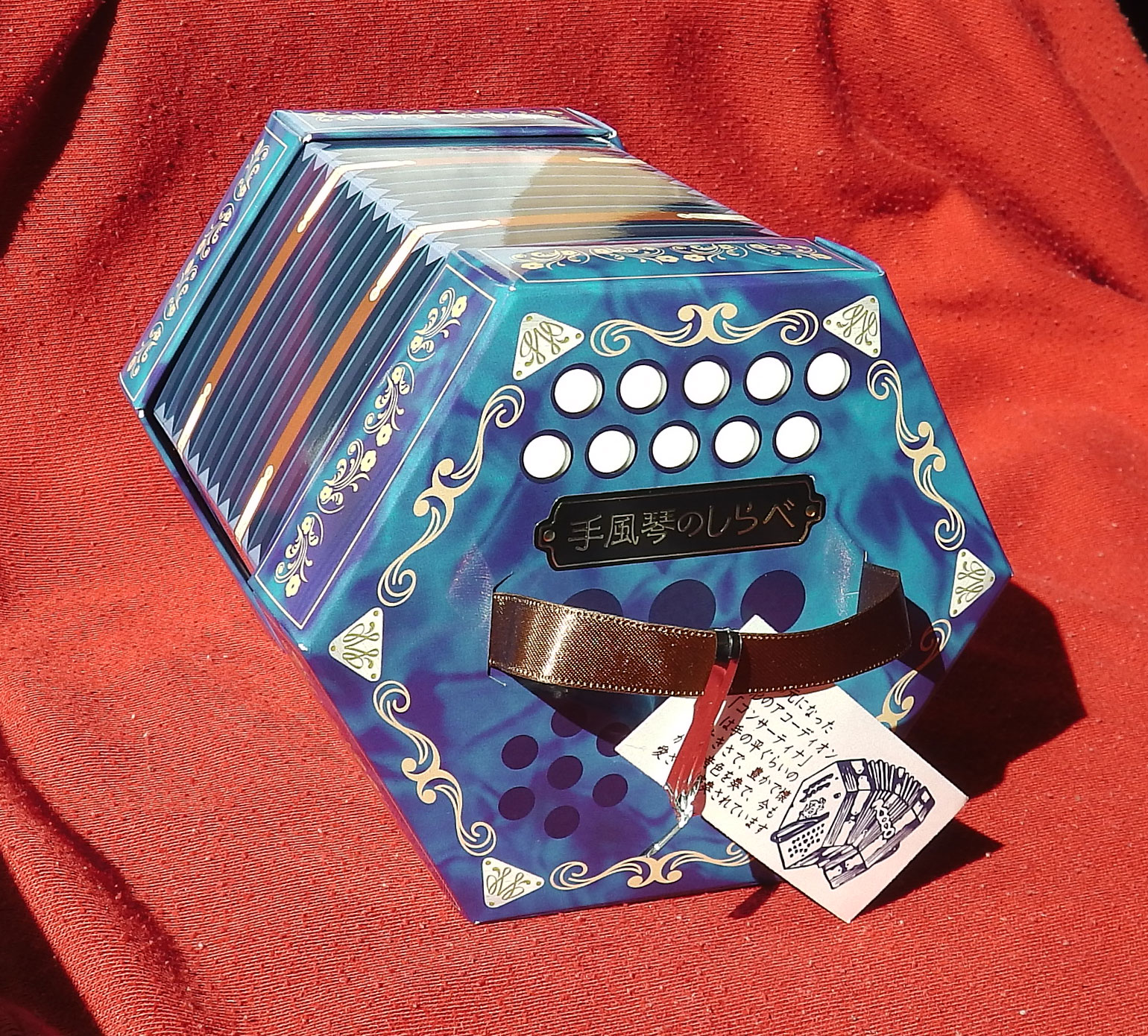
paper box

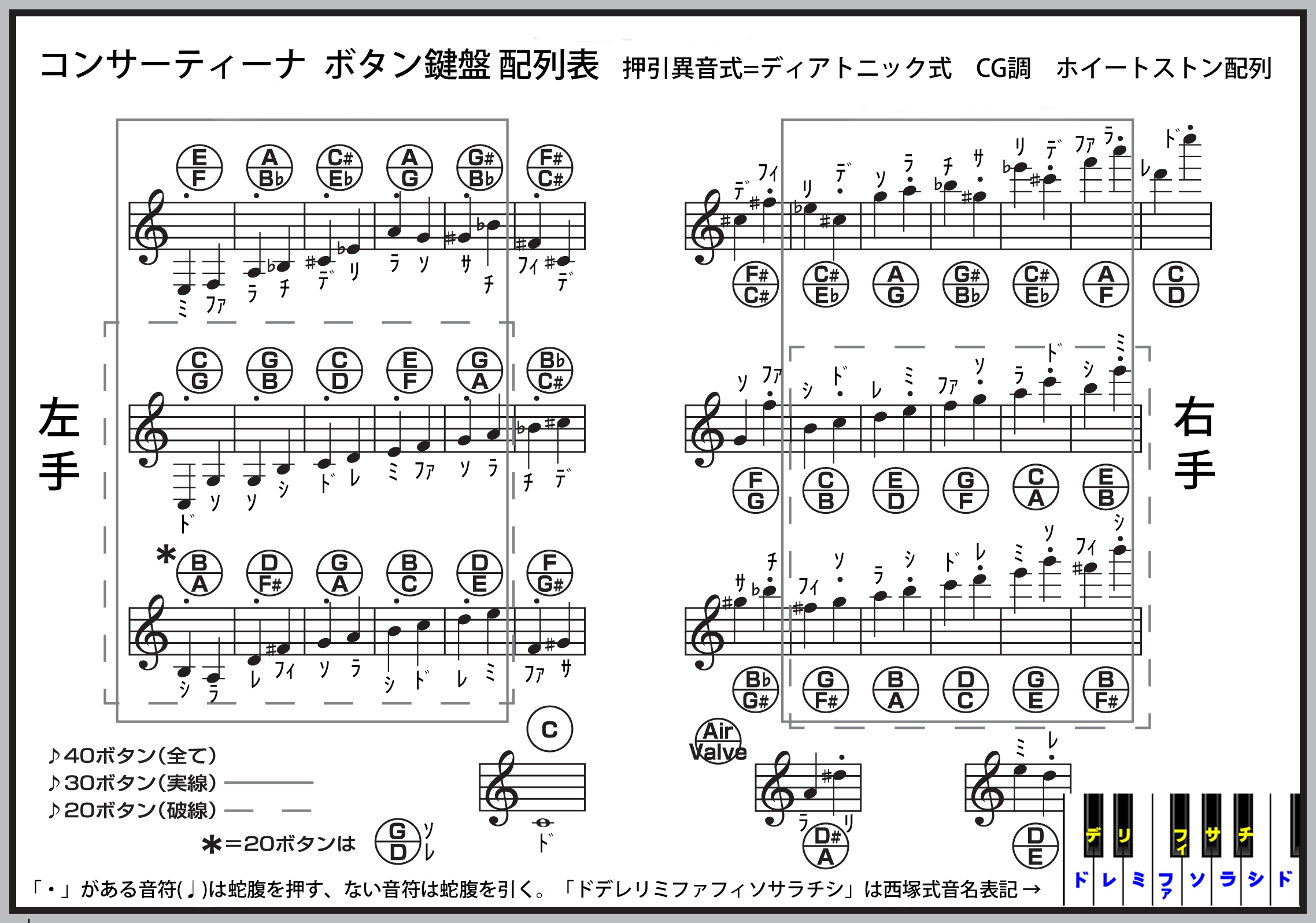
a keyboard chart

== Producers ==
George Jones is often credited as the first English chromatic Anglo concertina maker. British firms active in the late 19th and early 20th centuries include those founded by Charles Wheatstone, Charles Jeffries (who built primarily Anglo-style concertinas), Louis Lachenal (who built concertinas in both English and Anglo styles and was the most prolific manufacturer of the period), and John Crabb.
