= Lachenal =

Lachenal may refer to:

- Adrien Lachenal (1849–1918), Swiss politician
- Edmond Lachenal (1855-1948), French potter
- Marie Lachenal (1848-1937), English concertina performer
- Louis Lachenal (1921–1955), French climber
- Raoul Lachenal (1885-1956), French potter
- Paul Lachenal (1884-1955), Swiss politician
- François Lachenal (1918-1997), Swiss publisher and diplomat
- Lachenal & Co., British concertina manufacturer founded by Louis L. Lachenal around 1850
