= English concertina =

Type of concertina

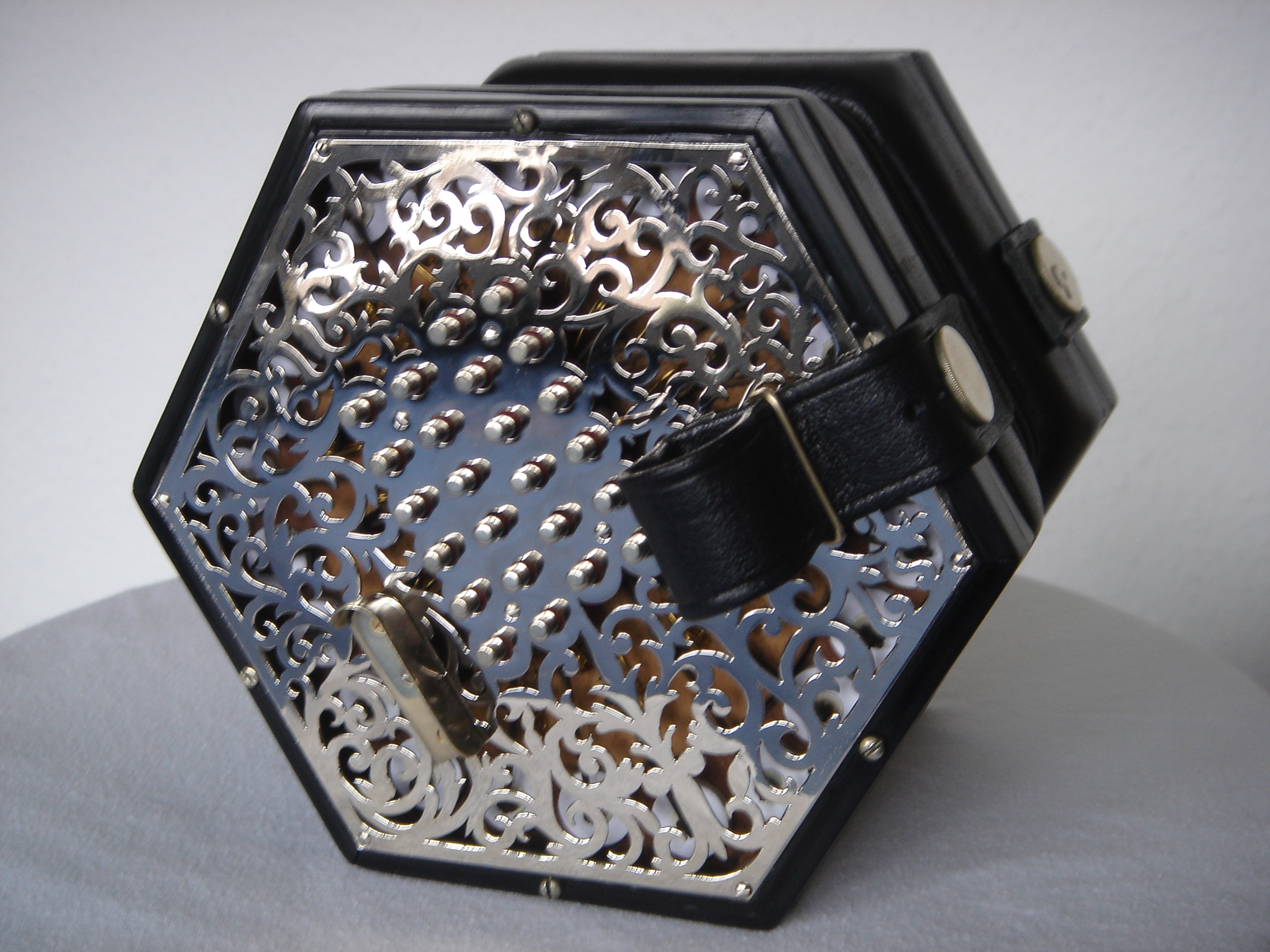
Lachenal metal-ended English concertina, c. 1895

The English concertina is a member of the concertina family of free-reed musical instruments. Invented in England in 1829, it was the first instrument of what would become the concertina family.

It is a fully chromatic instrument, having buttons in a rectangular arrangement of four staggered rows; its buttons are unisonoric, producing the same note on both the push and pull of the bellows. It differs from other concertinas in that the scale is divided evenly between the two hands, such that playing a scale involves both hands alternately playing each note in sequence.

== History ==
The invention of the instrument is credited to Sir Charles Wheatstone; his earliest patent of a like instrument was granted 19 December 1829, No 5803 in Great Britain.

The English concertina was initially used for playing classical music, virtuosic solos, and chamber music. By the 1860s and 1870s, the English concertina grew more popular in the music hall tradition. The evangelical Salvation Army adopted all systems of the concertina as a more portable and flexible alternative to brass instruments, and published a number of tutor books showing the complexity and range of the music they played on the English system.

=== Folk music ===
==== England ====
In the English Folk Revival of the 1960s, though the English concertina had been more an art music instrument, it became popular with British folk musicians. Karl Dallas has suggested that the mere presence of 'English' in the name attracted some of the revival's demographic; however the instrument's versatility and portability were also important as factors in the instrument's adoption. Alf Edwards was a regular accompanist to both A. L. Lloyd and Ewan MacColl, and taught the instrument to Peggy Seeger. His virtuosic and reliable playing was a key element in the adoption of the English concertina by the English folk revival, featuring prominently on influential records such as The Iron Muse and on the Radio Ballads.

Later in the 1960s Alistair Anderson became known for interpreting the traditional dance music of Britain, particularly that of Northumbria. The English concertina has a strong representation amongst amateur players of English folk music; modern nationally known folk performers on the English concertina include Robert Harbron, Sandra Kerr, Graham Kennett, and the Scottish musician Simon Thoumire.

==== Ireland ====
The English concertina found limited use in Irish traditional music – significantly less than the Anglo concertina. Rick Epping plays Irish music on the harmonica whilst accompanying himself on English concertina.

==== South Africa ====
Although the Boeremusiek of the Afrikaner people of South Africa was predominantly played on the Anglo concertina, English system players were also recorded.

References in Boeremusiek to the "4-ry" (four row) concertina refer to the English system. Boer musicians used the actual word "English" to mean Anglo system instruments made by English firms such as Lachenal & Co. and Wheatstone (and, less frequently, English and Duet system instruments made by those English companies).

==== Latin America ====
While it was primarily the bandoneon concertina which achieved success in South America, the English concertina gained some popularity in Bolivia, particularly in the Cochabamba region. It is theorized the instrument may have been brought there by foreign technicians working on the Bolivian Railway or the Patiño mines.

== Play ==
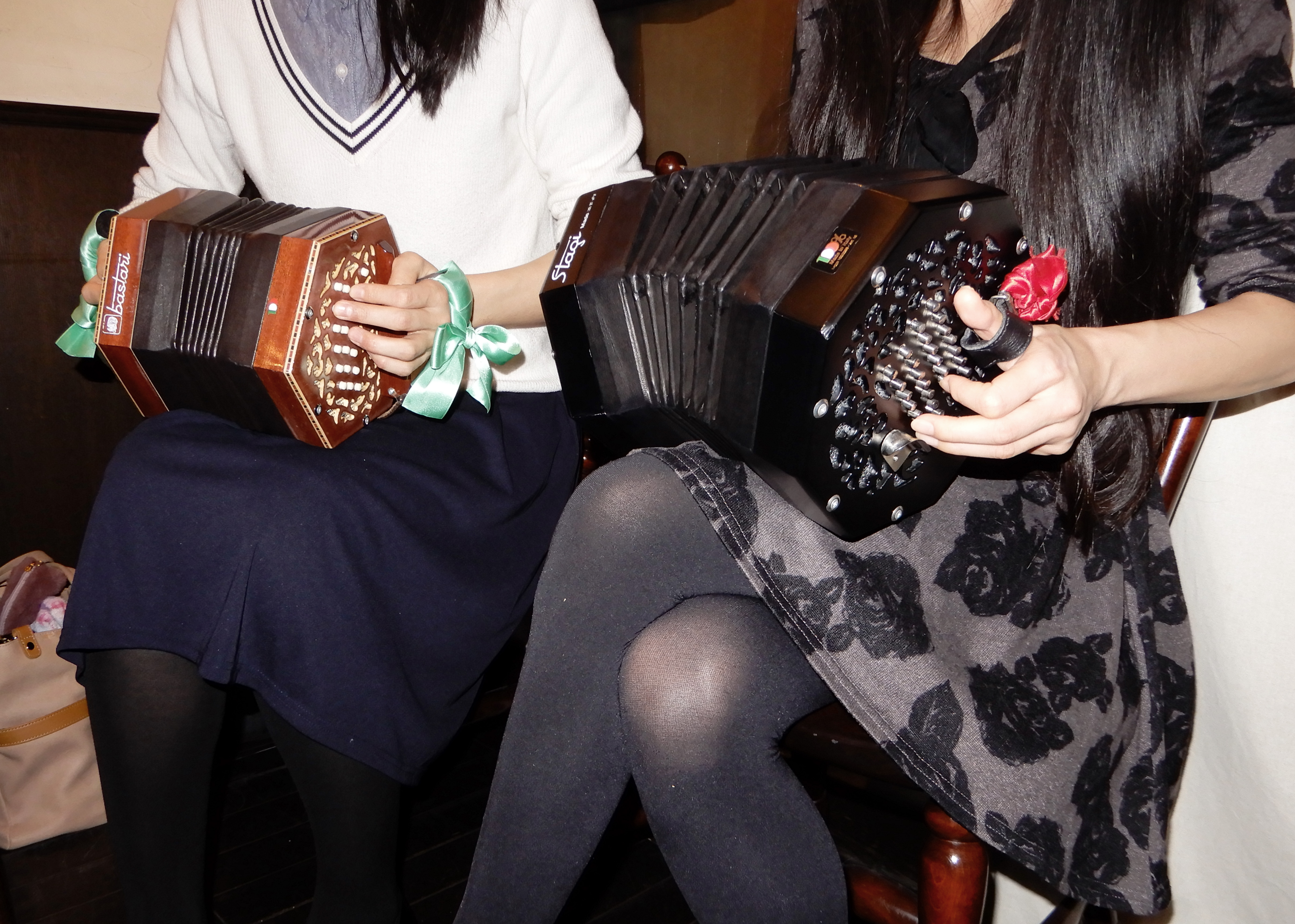
English concertina player using all four fingers to play notes

The English concertina is typically held by placing the thumbs through thumb straps and the little fingers on metal finger rests, leaving three fingers free for playing. Many players also intermittently or continuously use the little finger to play notes, thus playing with all four fingers and relying upon the thumb straps to support the instrument. Heavier and larger instruments were often fitted with wrist straps and/or a neck sling to further support the weight of the instrument.

The two innermost rows of the layout constitute a diatonic C major scale, distributed alternately between the two sides of the instrument. Thus in a given range, C-E-G-B-d is on one side, D-F-A-c-e on the other. The two outer rows consist of the sharps and flats required to complete the chromatic scale. This distribution of scale notes between sides facilitates rapid melodic play.

English-system treble and tenor-treble concertinas usually span 3 1/2 or 4 octaves. Baritones are similar, but transpose down one octave. Bass concertinas transpose two octaves down, contrabass concertinas 3 octaves down and piccolo concertinas play one octave up.

The standard keyboard arrangement across treble, baritone and bass instruments has middle C on the button nearest the player on the second row of the left hand keyboard; tenor instruments may have that position button as the F below middle C.

Tenor, baritone and bass concertinas often have an air valve in the position that would otherwise be occupied by the instrument's highest note. The air button is an essential feature of many bass concertinas which only have reeds to sound on the push bellows direction, due to the increased size of the reeds.

== Performers and repertoire ==
Giulio Regondi was a virtuoso performer and composer on this instrument as well as the guitar, and helped to popularize the instrument during the 19th century. In the classical style of Regondi, the little finger is used as well as the other three fingers, and the metal finger rests are used only very occasionally. This allows all eight fingers to simultaneously play the instrument so large chords are possible. In pieces such as the Bernhard Molique Concerto No 1 in G for concertina and orchestra, or Percy Grainger's Shepherd's Hey, four, five, and six note chords are not uncommon, and would be difficult or impossible to play without using all the fingers.

Allan Atlas, in his book The Wheatstone Concertina in Victorian England identifies six known concertos written for this instrument.

== Bibliography ==
- Atlas, Allan W. (1996). The Wheatstone English Concertina in Victorian England. Oxford: Clarendon Press. ISBN 978-0-19-816580-4
- Henry Doktorski (1998). The Classical Concertina Archived 2008-05-15 at the Wayback Machine
- Eydmann, Stuart (2005). The Life and Times of the Concertina: the adoption and usage of a novel musical instrument with particular reference to Scotland. Chapter 5: The English Concertina: Instrument of the Victorian Middle Classes. Concertina.com
