= Steven Dorocke =

American steel guitar player

Stephen Dorocke is an American steel guitar player. He has performed with The Handsome Family and Freakwater, among others. Stephen also contributed stellar standard electric guitar work as a member of Seattle-based studio legends, Throttle Body (aka. Throttle Body Motorcycle Club) on two EP releases, "For the Few" and "Marley's Chain". He is a founding member of the band Can.Ky.Ree with master songwriter Tom Musick, and also the band Pilgrim Beware featuring Jennifer Paul and Brian A. Doyle.

Stephen currently focuses on improvised music and sound art utilizing a modified resophonic guitar, the "resophone." The title of this ongoing and research is "Risofon."

Previously, Dorocke was a craftsman at Star Concertina in Cicero, Illinois, the last full-time manufacturer of Chemnitzer concertinas in the US, which ceased manufacturing operations in 2000. S.D. studied violin bow making in the French tradition with Noel Burke, violin lutherie with Felix Habel, and had made several oud-variant instruments.
