= Carl Friedrich Uhlig =

German luthier

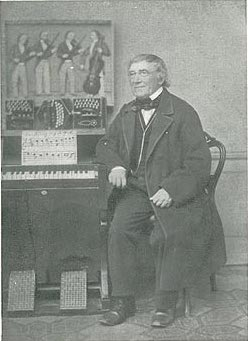

Carl Friedrich Uhlig (1789–1874) was a German luthier, known for inventing the German family of concertinas, from which are descended variants such as the Anglo concertina, bandoneón, Carlsfelder concertina, and Chemnitzer concertina.

Uhlig produced his first concertina in 1834, being dissatisfied with the early accordion keyboard developed by Cyrill Demian. Uhlig took the right-handed keyboard of Demian, and split it between the two hands, resulting in an instrument which had two separate keyboards producing individual notes. While Uhlig's development of the concertina is very parallel to that of Charles Wheatstone, the founder of the English family of concertinas, there is no definite indication they were aware of each other's work.
