= Chemnitzer concertina =

Musical instrument

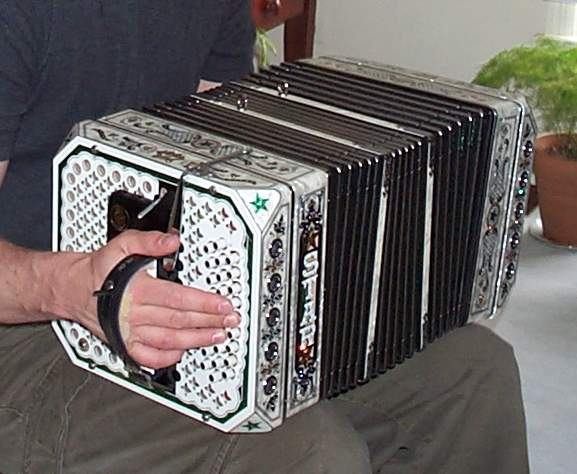
- Classification: Free reed aerophone

Related instruments
- Bandoneón; Concertina

Musicians
- Li'l Wally; David Eugene Edwards; Gary Erickson; Christy Hengel; Jim Herda; Dan Witucki; Vinny Lech; Karl Hartwich; Brian Brueggen; Gary Brueggen; Elmer Scheid; Johnny Gag; Jerry Schuft; Josh Sellner; Adam Sandhurst; Cory Miller (musician); Dain Moldan; Jerry Minar; Jack Beachly; Charlie Tansek; Ron Lech

Builders
- Josh Sellner, Supreme Concertina; Jerry Minar, Hengel Concertina; Albert Nechanicky, Nicky Concertina; Bob Novak, Echo Concertina

A Chemnitzer concertina is a musical instrument of the hand-held bellows-driven free-reed category, sometimes called squeezeboxes. The Chemnitzer concertina is most closely related to the bandoneón (German spelling: Bandonion), and more distantly, to the other types of concertinas and accordions. It's essentially a bigger version of the Anglo Concertina that sounds more akin to an accordion due to having multiple ranks of reeds.

== Physical description ==
It is roughly square in cross-section, with the keyboards consisting of cylindrical buttons on each end arranged in curving rows. Like other concertinas, the buttons are at the sides of the instrument, whereas the keys and buttons of an accordion are at the front. A strap, usually of leather, is fitted at each end to hold the player's palm against the instrument for playing. Compare to the English concertina where the thumb holds a strap, the little finger is held on a rest, and the remaining three fingers press the keys. The instrument is bisonoric, meaning that each button corresponds to two notes: one when the bellows is compressed, and another when it is expanded. On most instruments, two or more (and as many as five) reeds sound for each note. The tones produced are either in octaves, unison, or in some combination thereof.

Internal construction is different from other concertinas in that the action more closely resembles that of an accordion, and that the reeds are of steel (rather than brass) and are often fixed in groups of twenty or more to long zinc or aluminum plates, rather than to individual frames. This arrangement resembles that of the Russian accordion, the bayan.

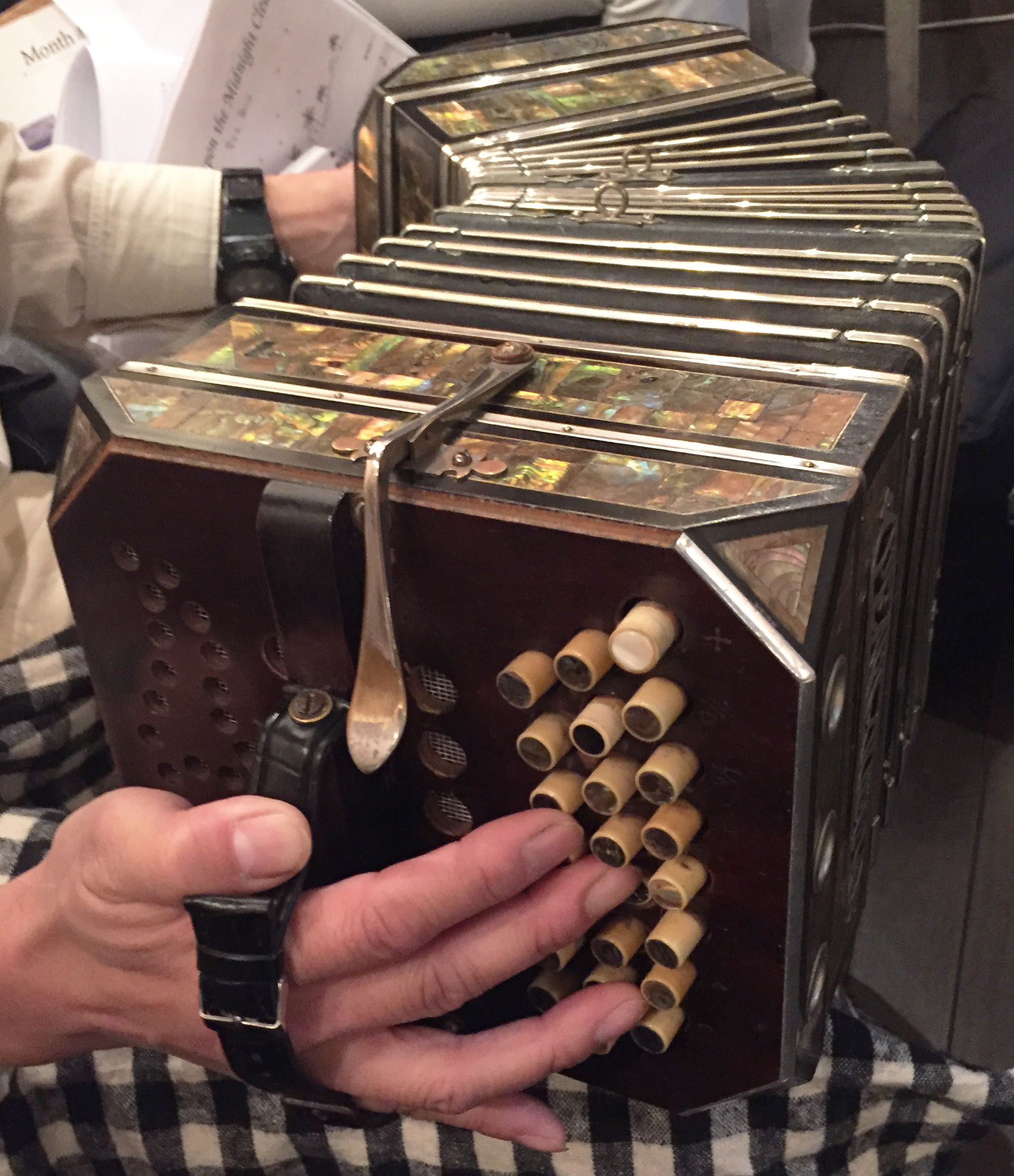
"Pearl Queen" 39-button model (serial number : 3762, manufacture year : 1926)

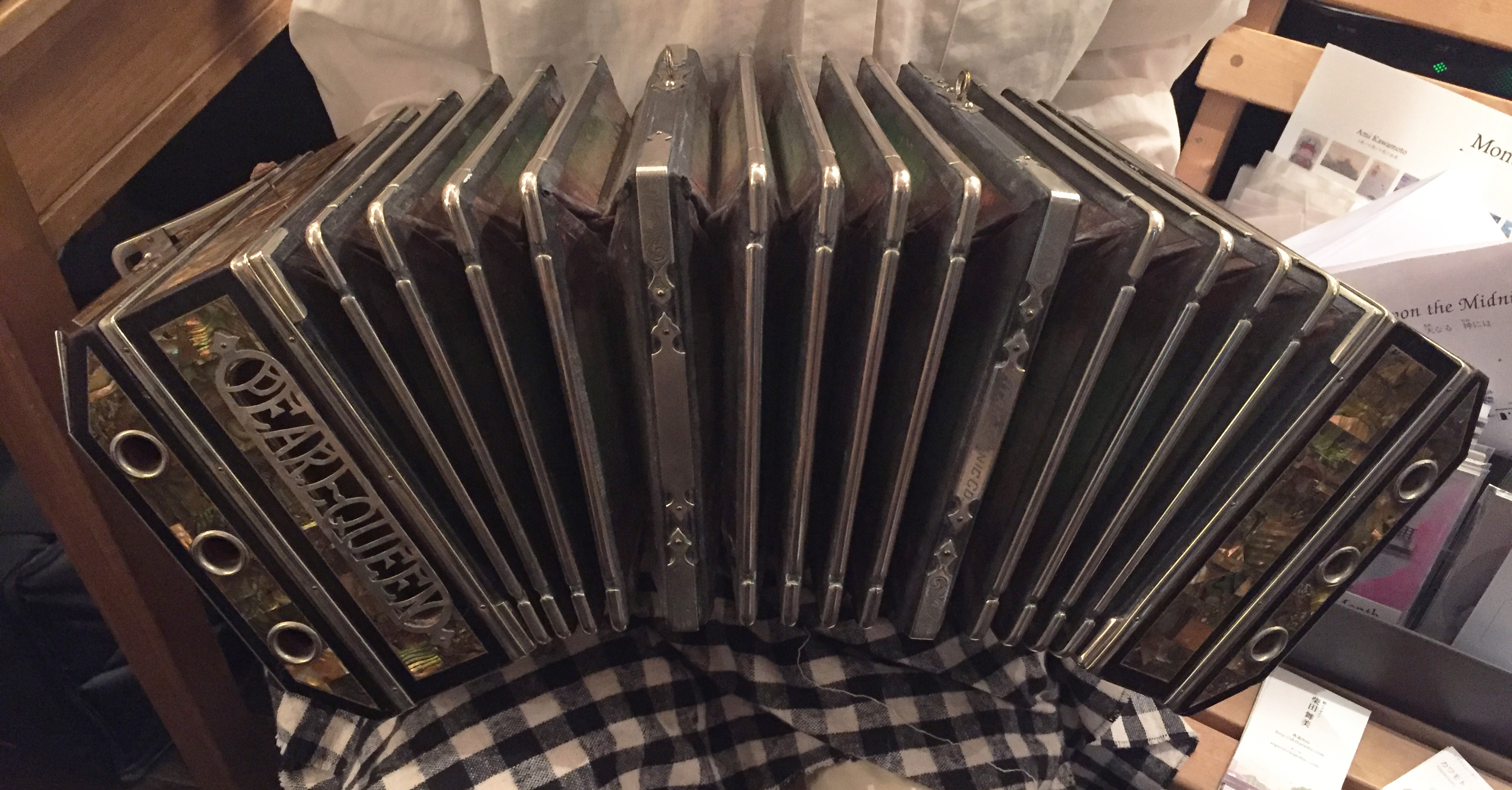

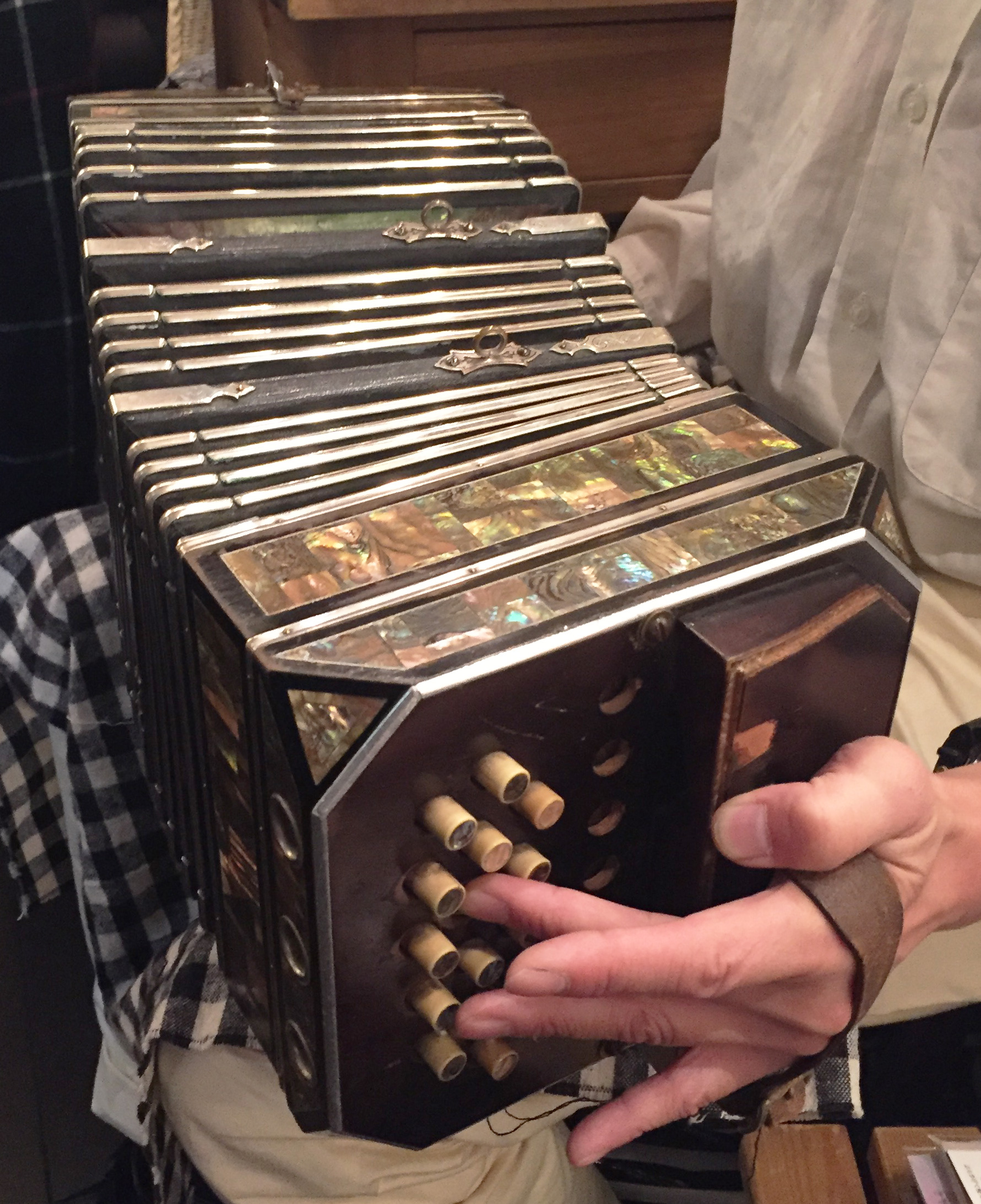

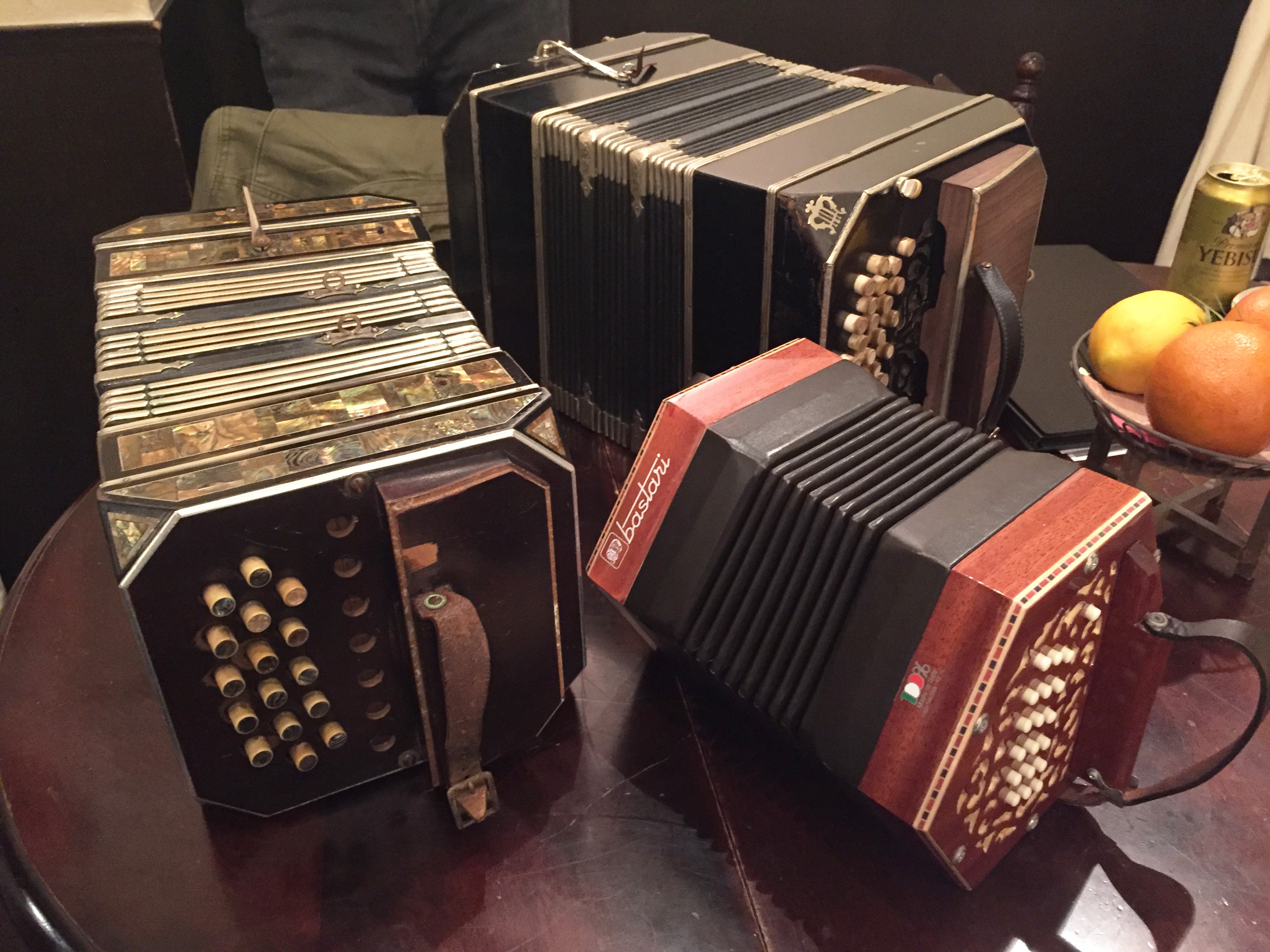
"Pearl Queen", Anglo concertina, bandoneon

== History ==
Sources differ whether German inventor Carl Friedrich Uhlig created his first concertina after seeing Charles Wheatstone's instrument of the same name, or whether the two men invented their instruments concurrently and independently. Uhlig's patent dates to 1834, and while Wheatstone patented a related instrument, the symphonium in 1829, he did not patent an instrument under the name "Concertina" until 1844.

== Types ==
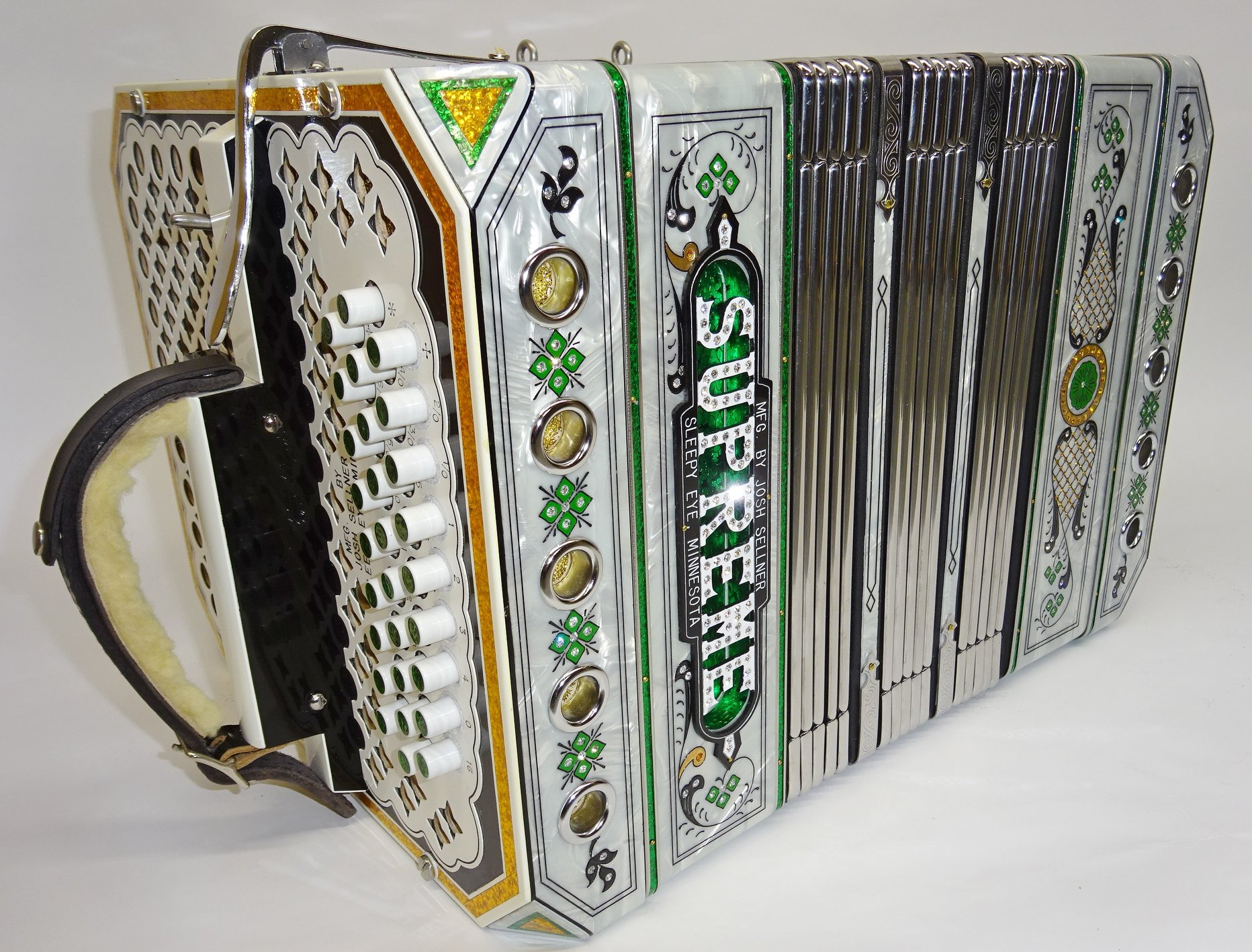
Supreme Chemnitzer Concertina

Uhlig's first instrument had five buttons on each side, but the keyboard was quickly expanded and as it did so, it diverged into different lineages. Heinrich Band's was sold under the name Bandonion. Several other German instruments were sold under the name concertina (or konzertina), and their keyboard systems were given names based on their creators, as with Band and Scheffler, or their city of origin, as with the Carlsfelder and Chemnitzer systems.

Strictly speaking, the Chemnitzer layout is one of 38, 39, 51 or 52 buttons, or one of the American expanded versions of the 52-button system. Especially in English-speaking countries, the term Chemnitzer is frequently applied to any of the square German concertinas that are not bandonions.

In the United States, especially in the Midwest, where other concertina types are not as well known, it may be called simply a "concertina".

There are also Chemnitzer concertinas with 65 buttons (130 notes in total) created by Albert Nechanicky which are called "130 Key Chromatic Concertinas". The treble keyboard has a 3 octave range from A3 to A6 and the bass keyboard has a complete Bass and Chord System with all 12 chromatic bass notes and 96 chords all of which can be played on both push and pull. These types of instruments are being revived and are becoming more popular in every genre of music, due to their versatility.

The 152-key Chromatic Chemnitzer has 76 buttons and uses an extended layout from the 130, increasing its range and versatility, also being recovered.

Chemnitzer Concertinas have up to 4 Ranks of Reeds, although versions w/ 5 (or more) sets of reeds exist & are being recovered.

== Innovations ==
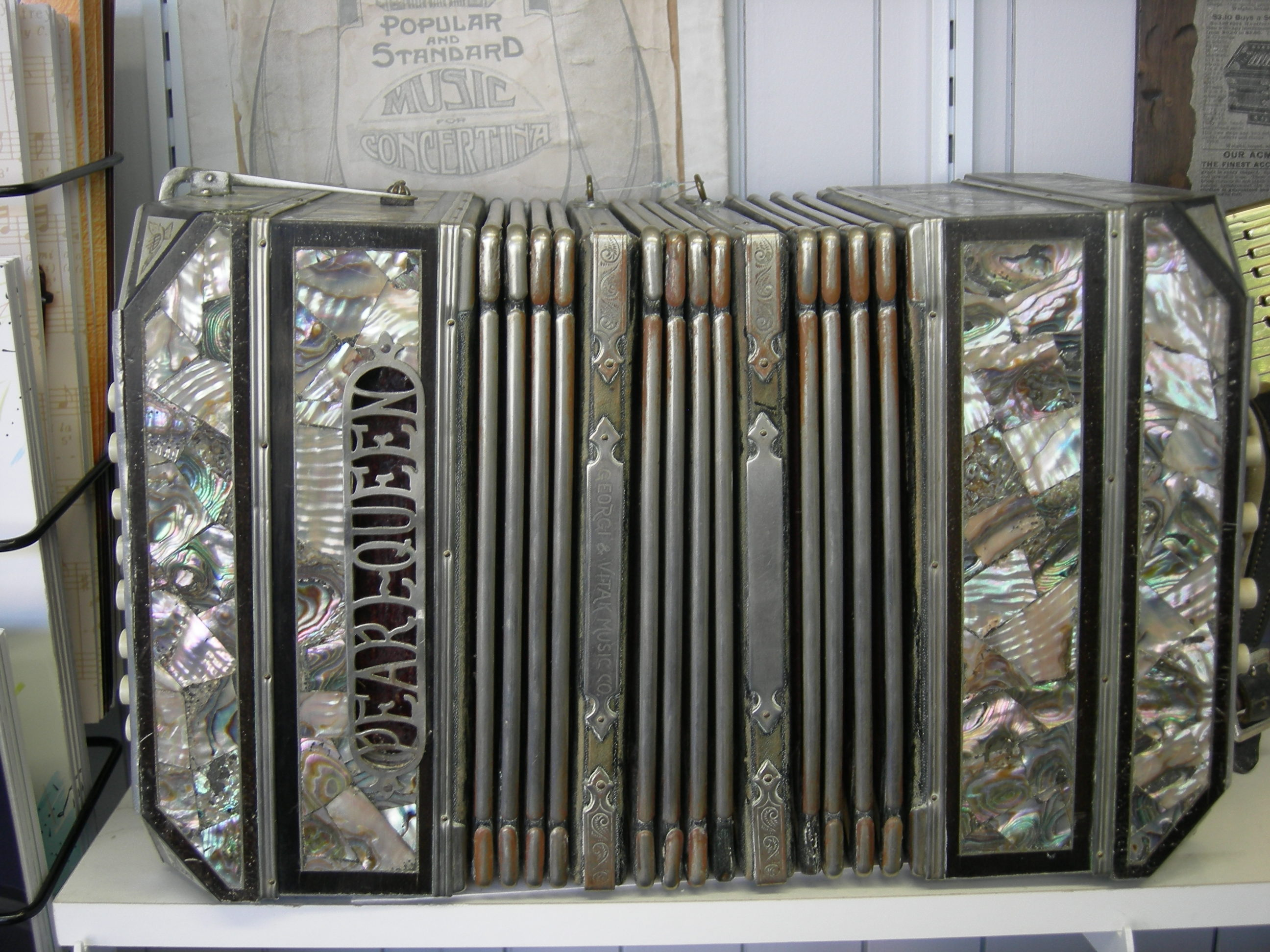
Pearl Queen by Otto Schlicht

The most notable innovations to the internal construction of the Chemnitzer concertina were made by German-American instrument builders in Chicago: Ernest Glass patented an aluminum action in 1912 (U.S. patent 1,024,771), which was quicker and quieter than earlier wooden actions; his son Otto further improved this action in 1928 (U.S. patent 1,737,839). Otto Schlicht patented an action in 1932 (U.S. patent 1,890,830) which improved the pivot method of the action levers and allowed action levers to be manufactured by bending metal stock rather than by die stamping. In 1910, prior to these improvements, Robert Leppert was issued a patent (U.S. patent 978,460), the specification of which describes in detail an action containing jointed levers between keys and pallets, however the claims of the patent only relate to a means of expression control also described; it is not clear whether Leppert actually invented the action arrangement.

Albert G. Nechanicky (1909-1986) invented the 130-key Chromatic Chemnitzer concertina which is fully chromatic, allowing it to play in every key. This innovative concertina eliminates the need to carry several 104-key concertinas pitched in different keys, sometimes built without markings identifying their respective tonalities. He also published a method for his instrument which explains how its layout differs from others.

Many American and Italian builders (such as Eagle Concertinas) of the 20th century began using reeds and reed blocks like the ones in accordions as a cost-saving measure, to facilitate repair, and to improve the sound.

== Repertoire ==
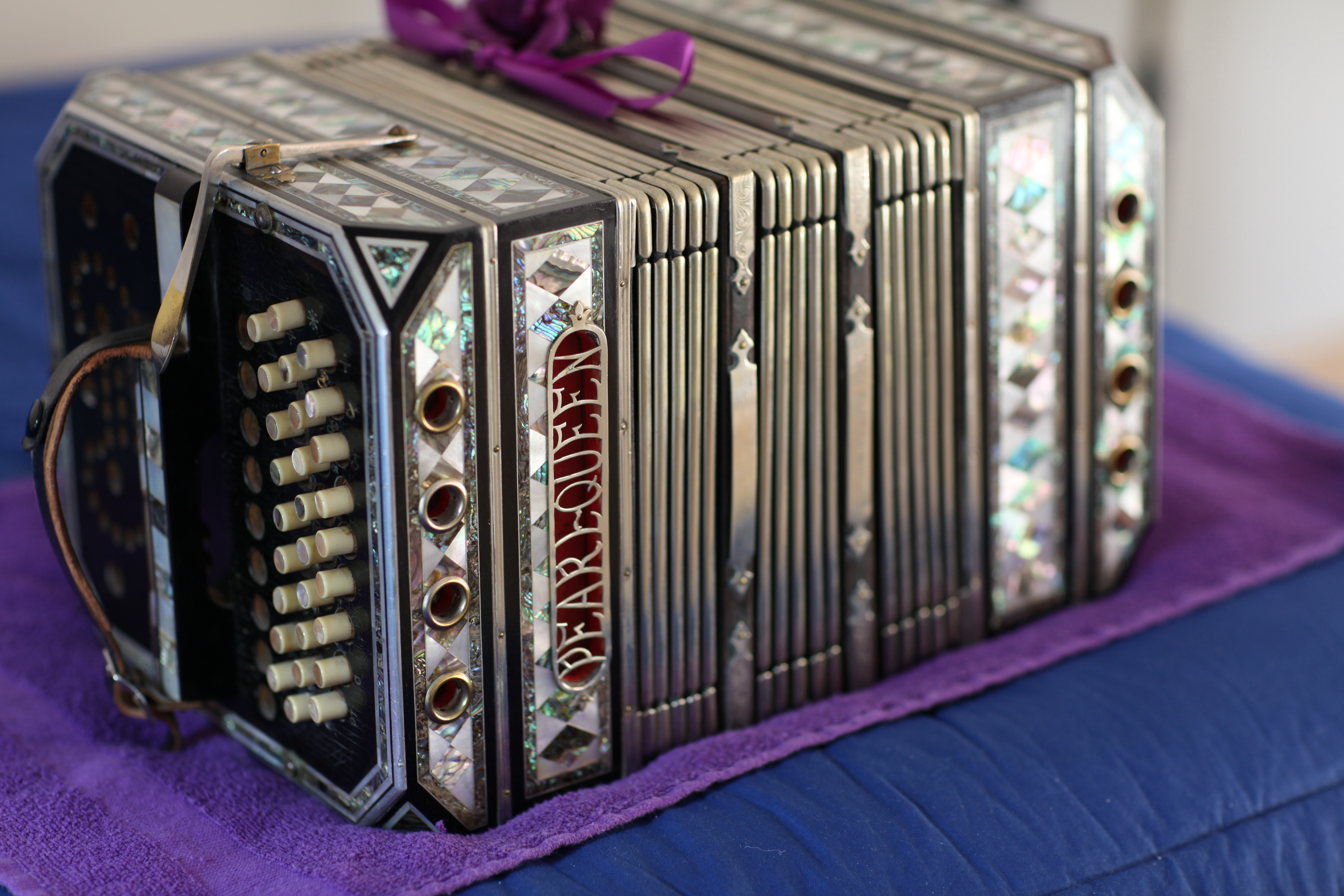
Pearl Queen Diamond Deluxe

The Chemnitzer concertina has been predominantly used in folk music, especially polka music played by Central and Eastern Europeans and by nineteenth- and twentieth-century immigrants to the United States from those regions. "Whoopee John" Wilfahrt and Walter "Li'l Wally" Jagiello were two prominent examples of polka musicians playing Chemnitzer concertinas. However, the instrument, especially in its 52-button and larger versions, is capable of performing in other musical contexts, such as classical music.
