= Nico Carstens =

- Born: Nicolaas Cornelius Carstens; 10 February 1926; Cape Town, South Africa
- Died: 1 November 2016 (aged 90) Cape Town
- Genres: Boeremusiek
- Occupations: Accordionist, Composer, Bandleader
- Instruments: Accordion, Piano
- Years active: 1939–2016
- Labels: Brigadiers, Capitol of the World Series, Columbia, EMI, His Master's Voice, MFP, Nebula Bos Records

Nicolaas Cornelius Carstens (10 February 1926 – 1 November 2016), commonly known as Nico Carstens, was a South African composer, accordionist, and bandleader.

== Early life ==
Born, 10 February 1926, in Cape Town of Afrikaner parents, Carstens got his first accordion at the age of 13 and won an adult music competition six months later. He composed his first music piece at the age of 17.

== Career ==
Carstens' most famous song "Zambezi" became a world hit and has been recorded by artists such as Eddie Calvert, Acker Bilk, Bert Kaempfert, The Shadows, James Last, Chet Atkins, Floyd Cramer and Johnny Dankworth. In 1982, The Piranhas took it to number 17 in the UK. Other versions of Carstens' compositions have been recorded by Horst Wende, Henri René, Geoff Love and bands in Australia, Italy and Poland.

Carstens wrote and performed music which spanned the various cultures of South Africa. He drew inspiration from various sources, including Cape Malay, Black Township and indigenous South African sounds and combined them to form a unique sound and style.

Since forming his own band at age 24, Carstens had composed more than 2000 songs and recorded over 90 albums which have sold over 2 million copies in South Africa. He did performances all over South Africa, Namibia, Mozambique, Zimbabwe and Botswana as well as at the Nantes Festival in France and he appeared on Musikantenstadl for ORF in 1997.

== Death ==
Nico Carstens, aged 90, died on the 1 November 2016 at the Netcare N1 Hospital in Cape Town.

== Compositions ==
Nico Carstens has been a prolific composer. A significant number of his compositions were done with the help of his longtime business associate Anton de Waal (a.k.a. George Charles Gunn).

- "Heartbreaking Waltz" – words & music by Anton de Waal & Nico Carstens
- "Hasie" – words & music by Nico Carstens & Anton de Waal
- "Kiewiet" – words & music by Nico Carstens & Anton de Waal
- "Kwela-Kwela" – by Nico Carstens, Charles Segal, Viv Styger & Anton de Waal, English lyrics by Geoffrey North
- "Little Bell" – words & music by Nico Carstens & Anton de Waal
- "Ring on Little Bell" – words and music by Anton de Waal & Nico Carstens
- "Rosie (must you wear your skirts so short?)" – music by Anton de Waal & Nico Carstens, words by Ben Raleigh & Guy Wood**
- "Sadie's Shawl" – by Nico Carstens & Sam Lorraine
- "Strike it Rich" (from the film, Kimberly Jim) – words & music by Nico Carstens & Anton de Waal
- "Wha Chi Bam Ba" – music by Nico Carstens & Anton de Waal
- "Wilde Klein Bokkie" (a.k.a. "Cruising") – words and music by Nico Carstens, Louis Combrinck & Anton de Waal
- "Zambezi" – instrumental by Nico Carstens & Anton de Waal, words added later by Bob Hilliard
- "Vuurwarm Vastrap" – music composed by Nico Carstens, played on pennywhistle by Susan Odendaal
