= Carlsfelder concertina =

Free-reed musical instrument from Germany

The Carlsfelder concertina (German: Carlsfelder konzertina) is a member of the German concertina family developed by Carl F. Zimmerman, based on the earlier Chemnitzer concertina of Carl Friedrich Uhlig. Zimmerman, a native of Carlsfeld, Saxony, unveiled his instrument at the 1849 Industrial Exhibition in Paris, the 1851 London Industrial Exposition, and the 1853 Exhibition of the Industry of All Nations in New York. Zimmerman expanded on Uhlig's early 1- and 2-row square concertinas, developing a 3-row chromatic bisonoric instrument, eventually selling his business to instrument maker Ernst Louis Arnold and emigrating to the United States, where he later became famous for his string instrument invention, the autoharp.
