= Marie Lachenal =

English concertina performer of classical music (1848-1937)

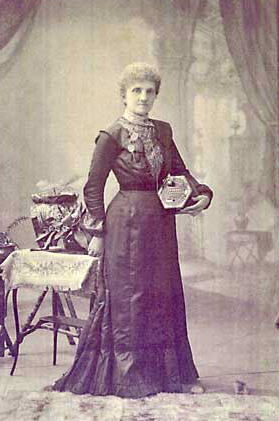
Marie Lachenal by her husband

Marie Lachenal (1848-1937) was an English concertina performer of classical music for Lachenal & Co., the concertina company that was run by her mother, Elizabeth Lachenal.

== Life ==
Lachenal was one of three daughters. Her Swiss father was Louis and her mother was Elizabeth Lachenal, They owned a concertina manufacturing company in Chiswick. Her father had started manufacturing in 1848 and by 1853 he had his own manufactory. Her father, Louis, died in 1861 and Elizabeth Lachenal continued the business. The three Lachanel daughters performed together from 1865 to 1866 and their performances received high acclaim, with Marie receiving praise from the press in her own right. Marie promoted the company's concertinas by performing with them. In 1868, she married the photographer Edwin Albert Debenham of Bournemouth. They had nine children, but only eight of them survived infancy.
