= Walter Jagiello =

Polish-American polka musician

Walter "Li'l Wally" Jagiello (also known as Władysław Jagiełło, Li'l Wally, also Mały Władziu and Mały Władzio, which both mean "Li'l Wally" in Polish) (August 1, 1930 – August 17, 2006) was a Polish American polka musician, songwriter and music arranger from Chicago, Illinois. He was a self-taught Chemnitzer concertina and drum player, who sang Polish as well as English in many of his songs. His most famous compositions include "Puka Jasiu (Johnny's Knocking)" and "I Wish I Was Single Again". His song "Let's Go, Go-Go White Sox", as recorded by Captain Stubby and the Buccaneers underwent a resurgence in 2005.

Originally starting out at the age of 8 singing with the Eddie Zima Orchestra performing up and down "Polish Broadway" in Chicago, Wally soon struck out on his own and formed his own band "The Happy Harmony Boys". He was a pioneer in the concept of the independent record label, starting his own Jay-Jay Records in 1951 after a brief career recording stint on Columbia Records, at the age of twenty. He was renowned for his drumbeat and slower and more danceable tempo, which became a mainstay of "Chicago Style" Polish-American polka sound. His arrangements of many popular Polish folk tunes, and many originals as well, are those used today by polka bands all over the United States. His nickname was derived from his short stature (5 foot 6 as an adult), especially during his youth, when he would stand on a picnic table to sing.

The highlight of Jagiello's career was performing for Pope John Paul II in 1984, who requested Wally continue playing after his initial song, "God Bless Our Polish Pope". The pontiff blessed him after his performance, telling him "God will reward you for all your hard work."

He also appeared several times playing his concertina on The Lawrence Welk Show. He was one of the first two inductees into the International Polka Association's Hall of Fame in 1969. All total, he has collected 17 gold and 4 platinum records.

In his later years, he retired to Miami Beach, Florida, but continued to perform and record and please audiences nationwide. Li'l Wally died on August 17, 2006, in Florida at the age of 76. He was cremated.

== Discography ==
=== Albums ===
Title	Hi-Fi Number	Stereo Number
America's Favorite Polka and Waltz Band	Jay Jay 1001	Jay Jay 5019
Happy Polkas	Jay Jay 1002	Jay Jay 5020
New Sound By The Best Around	Jay Jay 1003	Jay Jay 5005
Polka Bandstand Favorites	Jay Jay 1004	Jay Jay 5038
The Polka Beat For Your Dancing Feet	Jay Jay 1006	Jay Jay 5037
Jolly Polkas	Jay Jay 1008	N/A
Old Country Polish Polkas	Jay Jay 1010	Jay Jay 5001
Polka Party	Jay Jay 1012	Jay Jay 5147
I Love To Polka	Jay Jay 1014	Jay Jay 5000
All-American Polkas	Jay Jay 1016	Jay Jay 5004
Koledy - Polish Christmas Carols Volume 1	Jay Jay 1017	N/A
Wesoło Do Tańca	Jay Jay 1018	Jay Jay 5006
Thanks For A Wonderful Evening	Jay Jay 1020	Jay Jay 5008
Koledy - Polish Christmas Carols Volume 2	Jay Jay 1023	Jay Jay 5011
Po Staro Krajsku	Jay Jay 1025	N/A
Dance Around The Christmas Tree	Jay Jay 1026	Jay Jay 5012
Polkas & Waltzes For Everyone	Jay Jay 1027	Jay Jay 5013
Smutku Niema, Gdy Mały Władziu Spiewa	Jay Jay 1031	Jay Jay 5017
Hit Parade	Jay Jay 1032	Jay Jay 5018
Let's Sing Together	Jay Jay 1034	Jay Jay 5022
Beautiful Polka Music	Jay Jay 1035	Jay Jay 5023
Songs You've Been Waiting For	Jay Jay 1036	Jay Jay 5036
Christmas Time	Jay Jay 1039	Jay Jay 5026
Polka Twist	Jay Jay 1041	Jay Jay 5028
Polish Polka Twist	Jay Jay 1044	Jay Jay 5031
Polish Sing-A-Long #2	Jay Jay 1047	Jay Jay 5034
50/50 Polkas & Waltzes	Jay Jay 1050	Jay Jay 5050
Something Different	Jay Jay 1052	Jay Jay 5052
Golden Waltzes	Jay Jay 1053	Jay Jay 5053
Dancing Fingers featuring Nervous Freddie	Jay Jay 1055	Jay Jay 5055
Sing with Me #3	Jay Jay 1056	Jay Jay 5056
Nowe Wesołe Piosenik Ludowe	Jay Jay 1057	Jay Jay 5057
Here Comes Li'l Wally	Jay Jay 1058	Jay Jay 5058
Polka Stars on Parade	Jay Jay 1059	Jay Jay 5059
My Vacation	Jay Jay 1064	Jay Jay 5064
Jeszcze Nasza!	Jay Jay 1065	Jay Jay 5065
Hot Chicken	Jay Jay 1069	Jay Jay 5069
One Man Band	Jay Jay 1073	Jay Jay 5073
Polish Party - Adults Only	Jay Jay 1077	Jay Jay 5077
Li'l Wally's Greatest!	Jay Jay 1078	Jay Jay 5078
Oh Boy, Polka Joy	Jay Jay 1079	Jay Jay 5079
A Polka Christmas	Jay Jay 1080	Jay Jay 5080
Pieknie Gra Poleczki Od Ucha	Jay Jay 1081	Jay Jay 5081
Bartender Song	Jay Jay 1086	Jay Jay 5086
Polish Wedding Album	Jay Jay 1089	Jay Jay 5089
Spiew I Głos	Jay Jay 1091	Jay Jay 5091
Do The Li'l Wally Twirl	Jay Jay 1094	Jay Jay 5094
Li'l Wally In Miami Beach	Jay Jay 1097	Jay Jay 5097
Nice With Polish Spice	Jay Jay 1098	Jay Jay 5098
Live It Up - Zyj Bracie! Po Polsku!	Jay Jay 1103	Jay Jay 5103
Sincerely Yours	Jay Jay 1104	Jay Jay 5104
Mr. Happy Music	Jay Jay 1107	Jay Jay 5107
Polka A Go-Go	Jay Jay 1110	Jay Jay 5110
A Tribute To Zima	Jay Jay 1112	Jay Jay 5112
Polish Adults Hit Parade	Jay Jay 1113	Jay Jay 5113
International Golden Hits	N/A	Jay Jay 5019
Li'l Wally Sings Po Polsku with Eddie Zima and His Band	N/A	Jay Jay 5099
Poland Tour	N/A	Jay Jay 5101
Kolędy Swiąteczne	N/A	Jay Jay 5105
Kochana Mama	Jay Jay 1114	Jay Jay 5114
Li'l Wally Salutes Lawrence Welk	N/A	Jay Jay 5117
Sing Along No. 4	N/A	Jay Jay 5118
There's More To A Wedding	N/A	Jay Jay 5119
Nowe Piosenki O Weselu (New Polish Wedding Songs)	Jay Jay 1120	Jay Jay 5120
Witamy Prezydenta	Jay Jay 1121	Jay Jay 5121
Polish Songs For You	N/A	Jay Jay 5121
Polish Sex	N/A	Jay Jay 5122
More New Polish Favorites	N/A	Jay Jay 5123
Polish Sing Along No. 5	N/A	Jay Jay 5124
Thank You - Polka Hall of Fame	N/A	Jay Jay 5127
Polish Carnival Time	N/A	Jay Jay 5132
Bombs	N/A	Jay Jay 5133
Unforgettable Hits	N/A	Jay Jay 5134
Suggestive and Hot	N/A	Jay Jay 5135
Around The World	N/A	Jay Jay 5136
Cieple Portki	N/A	Jay Jay 5137
Stary Kaziu Gra	N/A	Jay Jay 5138
Polish Hits of the 50s	N/A	Jay Jay 5141
Polkarama	N/A	Jay Jay 5142
Li'l Wally in Action	N/A	Jay Jay 5145
Polka Party With Li'l Wally	N/A	Jay Jay 5147
Proud To Be An American	N/A	Jay Jay 5148
America's Greatest Polka Band	N/A	Jay Jay 5151
Polskie Czucie - Polish Feelings	N/A	Jay Jay 5153
Nowe Wesołe Piosenki	N/A	Jay Jay 5158
Li'l Wally Brings Happiness To You	N/A	Jay Jay 5162-3
All Night with Li'l Wally	N/A	Jay Jay 5163
Fantasztyczne	N/A	Jay Jay 5165
National Hits	N/A	Jay Jay 5164
Fantasztyczne	N/A	Jay Jay 5165
Jolly Times "Wesole Czasy"	N/A	Jay Jay 5166
The Best! Co Jest!	N/A	Jay Jay 5167
Jagiello Sound Vol. 1	N/A	Jay Jay 8000
Jagiello Production Vol. 2	N/A	Jay Jay 8001
Jagiello Sound Vol. 3	N/A	Jay Jay 8002
Christmas Favorites From Poland	N/A	Jay Jay 8003
Lil Wally in France, Vol. I	N/A	Jay Jay 8004
Polish Religious Hymns by Li'l Wally and the St. Stanislaus Choral Group	N/A	Jay Jay S100

=== Singles ===
Year	Titles (A-side, B-side)	Label & Catalogue #	Album
1955	"Chicago Waltz" b/w "New Circus Polka" (from New Sound By The Best Around)	Jay Jay 133	Non-album track
1955	"Wish I Was Single Again" b/w "Ooh-La-La-La Polka"	Jay Jay 145	America's Favorite Polka and Waltz Band
1955	"We Left Our Wives At Home" b/w "I'm In Love With You Polka" (from America's Favorite Polka and Waltz Band)	Jay Jay 148	New Sound By The Best Around
1955	"Sleigh Bells Waltz" b/w "Jingle Bells Polka"	Jay Jay 150	Non-album tracks
1956	"Who'd Ya Like To Love Ya" b/w "Blue Skirt Waltz" (from New Sound By The Best Around)	Jay Jay 154	America's Favorite Polka and Waltz Band
1956	"I'll Never Do It Again" b/w "Jolly Polly Polka"	Jay Jay 160	America's Favorite Polka and Waltz Band
1956	"Juz Tego Nie Uczynie (I'll Never Do It Again)" b/w "Zosia Polka (Sophie Polka)"	Jay Jay 162	Najweselsze Poleczki I Walce W Ameryce
1956	"Jay Jay Hop" b/w "Bedtime Polka"	Jay Jay 165	Polka Band Stand Favorites
1956	"Just Because Polka" b/w "Milwaukee's Favorite Waltz" (whose melody is Du, du liegst mir im Herzen)	Jay Jay 166	America's Favorite Polka and Waltz Band
1956	"Lover Give Me A Chance" b/w "Tick Tock Polka"	Jay Jay 167	America's Favorite Polka and Waltz Band
1957	"Take Me Baby Polka" b/w "Barbara Polka"	Jay Jay 168	New Sound By The Best Around
1957	"'You" Waltz" (with The Lucky Harmony Boys Orchestra) b/w "Play Me A Polka" (from New Sound By The Best Around)	Jay Jay 171	The Polka Beat For Your Dancing Feet
1957	"Julida" b/w "Rain Rain"	Jay Jay 173	New Sound By The Best Around
1957	"I Need You Waltz" b/w "Clarinet Polka" (from New Sound By The Best Around)	Jay Jay 175	The Polka Beat For Your Dancing Feet
1957	"Live It Up Polka" b/w "Brown Eyes Polka" (from Polka Band Stand Favorites)	Jay Jay 177	The Polka Beat For Your Dancing Feet
1958	"Oh Mary Ann" (with Ed Lash) b/w "Fascination" (from Golden Waltzes)	Jay Jay 186	Non-album track
1958	"Whatcha Got Polka" b/w "I Dream Of Irene" (from The Polka Beat For Your Dancing Feet)	Jay Jay 191	Non-album track
1959	"Seven Days Without You Polka" b/w "Tu Lu Lu Waltz"	Jay Jay 197	Polka Party
1959	"Dark Eyes Waltz" b/w "Chicago Is A Polka Town Polka" (from The Polka Beat For Your Dancing Feet); Both sides with the Lucky Harmony Boys	Jay Jay 198	I Love To Polka
1959	"What Is It Polka" b/w "Squeeze Box Polka"	Jay Jay 201	Non-album tracks
1959	"She's Too Fat For Me Polka" b/w "Out With The Boys" (from All American Polkas); Both sides with The Lucky Harmony Boys	Jay Jay 199	I Love To Polka
1959	"Doodle Doo Doo Polka" b/w "Love Me Forever Polka" (from The Polka Beat For Your Dancing Feet)	Jay Jay 203	Non-album track
1959	"My Wife Got Drunk Polka" b/w "To Be In Love With Someone"	Jay Jay 205	All American Polkas
1959	"Marina Polka" b/w "Dreaming Of You Waltz" (from All American Polkas)	Jay Jay 208	Non-album tracks
1959	"Happy New Year (Wesolego Nowego Roku) b/w "Jesus Was Born (Narodzil Sie Jezus)"	Jay Jay 209	Non-album tracks
1960	"You Are My Sweetheart Now" b/w "St. Paul Waltz"	Jay Jay 211	All American Polkas
1960	"Joe and Josey Polka" b/w "Stevens Point Oberek" (from Polka Party)	Jay Jay 213	
1960	"When Irish Eyes Are Smiling" b/w "Rosey From Jersey" (from I Love To Polka)	Jay Jay 214	
1960	"Nasze Rozlaczenie (Our Break Up Polka)" b/w "U Mego Tatusia (Daddy's Polka)"	Jay Jay 216	Li'l Wally's Greatest 15 Hits Vol. 1
1960	"Thanks For A Wonderful Evening" b/w "Helena Polka" (from All American Polkas)	Jay Jay 218	
1960	"Old Grey Mare" b/w "Baby Doll" (from I Love To Polka)	Jay Jay 219	Songs You've Been Waiting For
1960	"I Feel Blue Because Of You (Opowiesc Kochanka)" b/w "Polonia Grove Polka"; Both sides with The Harmony Boys	Jay Jay 220	Polka Party
1960	"He'll Have To Go" b/w "Brighton Park Polka" (Non-album track)	Jay Jay 221	Hot Chicken
1960	"My Shoes Keep Walking Back To You" b/w "Julianna Polka" (from Polka Party)	Jay Jay 225	Polkas & Waltzes For Everyone
1960	"Lovely Girl Polka (Ladna Dziewczyna)" b/w "Only A Girl" (Non-album track)	Jay Jay 226	Live It Up!
1960	"Santa Claus Is Coming To Town" b/w "How Lovely Is Christmas"	Jay Jay 228	Dance Around The Christmas Tree
1960	"Auld Lang Syna" b/w "Dance Around The Christmas Tree"	Jay Jay 229	Dance Around The Christmas Tree
1960	"Merry Christmas Mom and Dad" b/w "Oh Christmas Tree"	Jay Jay 230	Dance Around The Christmas Tree
1961	"Smile Awhile" b/w "Red Wing" (from All American Polkas); Both sides with The Lucky Harmony Boys Orchestra	Jay Jay 233	
1961	"Kalina W Lesie (Wilted Bush and Angry Love)" b/w "Siwe Golabisie (Grey Pigeons)" (from Sincerely Yours)	Jay Jay 238	Li'l Wally's Greatest 15 Hits Vol. 1
1961	"Whatever Will Be, Will Be" b/w "Wedding Bells Are Breaking Up That Old Gang Of Mine"	Jay Jay 239	Hit Parade By Li'l Wally
1961	"Green Meadow Polka" b/w "Sad Without You"	Jay Jay 241	Smutku Nie Ma, Gdy Maly Wladziu Spiewa
1961	"San Antonio Rose" b/w "Margie"	Jay Jay 245	Hit Parade By Li'l Wally
1961	"Wooden Heart" b/w "I Have The Blues"	Jay Jay 246	Beautiful Polka Music
1961	"Gleboka Studzienka (Wishing Well)" b/w "Pragna Oczka Pragna (Naughty Eyes)"	Jay Jay 247	Let's Sing Together With Li'l Wally In Polish!
1961	"Mexico" b/w "Ej Marie" (from Beautiful Polka Music)	Jay Jay 250	
1961	"Li'l Wally Polka Twist" b/w "Twistin' and Turnin' Polka"	Jay Jay 254	Polka Twist
1962	"Jakem Do Dziew Chodzil" b/w "Zenil Sie Nie Bede" (from Polish Songs For You)	Jay Jay 267	Songs You've Been Waiting For
1962	"Chicago Oberek" b/w "Something New"	Jay Jay 269	Polka Twist
1962	"How Can I Forget" b/w "Happy Cousins Polka"	Jay Jay 279	Something Different
1963	"Johnny's Knockin'" b/w "Here Comes My Lover"	Jay Jay 283	Nowe Wesole Piosenik Ludowe
1963	"Return To Me" (Przydz Do Mnie)" b/w "Hay Hay Polka (Siano, Siano)" (from Noew Wesole Piosenik Ludowe)	Jay Jay 286	Non-album track
1963	"Mosquito Polka (Komara)" b/w "I Want A Sweetheart (Chce Miec Dziewczyne)"	Jay Jay 287	Nowe Wesole Piosenik Ludowe
1963	"Boy, Oh Boy Polka" b/w "Night After Night" (Non-album track)	Jay Jay 292	Something Different
1963	"Nightingale Polka" b/w "Night After Night" (from Jagiello Sound Vol. 3)	Jay Jay 294	Non-album tracks
1964	"Welcome Beatles" (with The Venturas); B-side by The Venturas: "My Happiness"	Drum Boy 108	Non-album tracks
1965	"She Likes Kiolbasa" b/w "Drunk In The Garden"	Jay Jay 304	One Man Band
1965	"Polka Joy" b/w "No Beer In Heaven"	Jay Jay 306	Oh Boy, Polka Joy!
1965	"One Has My Heart, The Other Has My Name" b/w "Ee-I-Oh Polka" (from Oh Boy, Polka Joy!)	Jay Jay 313	Bartender Song
1965	"Bartenders Song" b/w "Balloon" (from Oh Boy, Polka Joy!)	Jay Jay 314	Bartender Song
1965	"Happiness" b/w "Goin' To The Fields"	Jay Jay 315	
1965	"Don't Be Afraid (Nie Boj sie)" b/w "Leaving Warsaw (Ide Z Warszawy)" (Non-album track)	Jay Jay 319	Bartender Song
1965	"Christmas In Your Heart" b/w "Hawaiian Christmas"	Drum Boy 115	
1965	"Don't Want To Be Alone (Nieche Byc Sam)" b/w "Loving Girl (Kochana Dziewczyna)"	Jay Jay 328	Spiew I Glos
1966	"Flowers For Mother" b/w "Time For Love"	Jay Jay 330	Spiew I Glos
1966	"Hot Tamale" b/w "Li'l Wally Twirl"	Jay Jay 331	Do The Li'l Wally Twirl
1966	"All For Nothing (Wszystko Nadaremnie)" b/w "Give Her To Me (Dajcie Mi Ja)"	Jay Jay 333	Li'l Wally Sings Po Polsku with Eddie Zima and His Band
1966	"Live Happy (Zyi Wesolo)" b/w "Vietnam Polka (Do Vietnam)"	Jay Jay 334	Poland Tour
1966	"One, Two, Three Happy Melody" b/w "Drinking Beer"	Jay Jay 335	My Vacation
1966	"Sincerely Yours" b/w "My Dear One" (Non-album track)	Jay Jay 336	Sincerely Yours
1966	"Oj Nie Nie Nie" b/w "Dziewczyna Jak Malina"	Jay Jay 340	Mr. Happy Music
1966	"Johnnie Johnnie" b/w "Loving Mom"	Jay Jay 343	Non-album tracks
1966	"Mini Skirt" b/w "Lawrence Welk Polka"	Jay Jay 344	Li'l Wally Salutes Lawrence Welk
1966	"There's More To A Wedding" b/w "Goodbye, Goodbye, Goodbye"	Jay Jay 348	There's More To A Wedding
1966	"Need You" b/w "Your Cheatin' Heart Is Showin'" (Non-album track)	Drum Boy 117	The Polka Beat For Your Dancing Feet
1971	"Hej Ha Um Pa Pa" b/w "You Get Married, Not Me"; Both tracks with Casey Siewierski	Jay Jay 354	
1971	"You Have My Heart" b/w "Jukebox Cheer"	Jay Jay 356	
1971	"Wish I Was Single Again" b/w "Happy Carnival" (from Polka Carnival Time)	Jay Jay 357	Wish I Was Single Again
1971	"I Stopped For A Beer" b/w "Thank You" (from Thank You -- Polka Hall Of Fame)	Jay Jay 360	
1972	"Some Of These Days" b/w "I Thought I'd Never Love Again" (from Bombs)	Jay Jay 362	Unforgettable Hits
1972	"Someday You'll Want Me" b/w "Italian Song" (Non-album track)	Jay Jay 363	Unforgettable Hits
1972	"Everybody Loves Somebody" b/w "Dream"	Jay Jay 364	Unforgettable Hits
1972	"Laughing On The Outside" b/w "You Have It" (Non-album track)	Jay Jay 365	Unforgettable Hits
1972	"Ta Ra Ra Boom Tiay" b/w "Blue Skirt" (Non-album track)	Jay Jay 369	Bombs
1972	"Now That I'm Single Again" b/w "Play Play Play" (Non-album track)	Jay Jay 371	Bombs
1972	"It's So Exciting" b/w "Polish Spirits"; Both sides with the Lucky Harmony Boys	Jay Jay 377	Non-album tracks
1973	"I Love Jelly Beans" b/w "Happy Times Polka"	Jay Jay 392	Non-album tracks
