= Otto Schlicht =

German-American manufacturer

Otto Schlicht was a German-American manufacturer of concertinas in Chicago.

== Biography ==
Schlicht arrived in the United States from Germany around 1900, having worked on German-type concertinas there. He applied his knowledge to the production of concertinas, and began producing models under the brand-names Patek, Pearl Queen, and Peerless for music shop in Illinois.

He transitioned to owning his own concertina workshop, where he produced his brands until 1950. Shortly after he ceased working, in 1952 concertina maker Christy Hengel purchased Schlicht's concertina-making equipment, which had been stored in a basement since the workshop closed, for $1500, moving it to his own shop in New Ulm, Minnesota, producing chemnitzer concertinas under the Helgel name.
