= Lachenal & Co. =

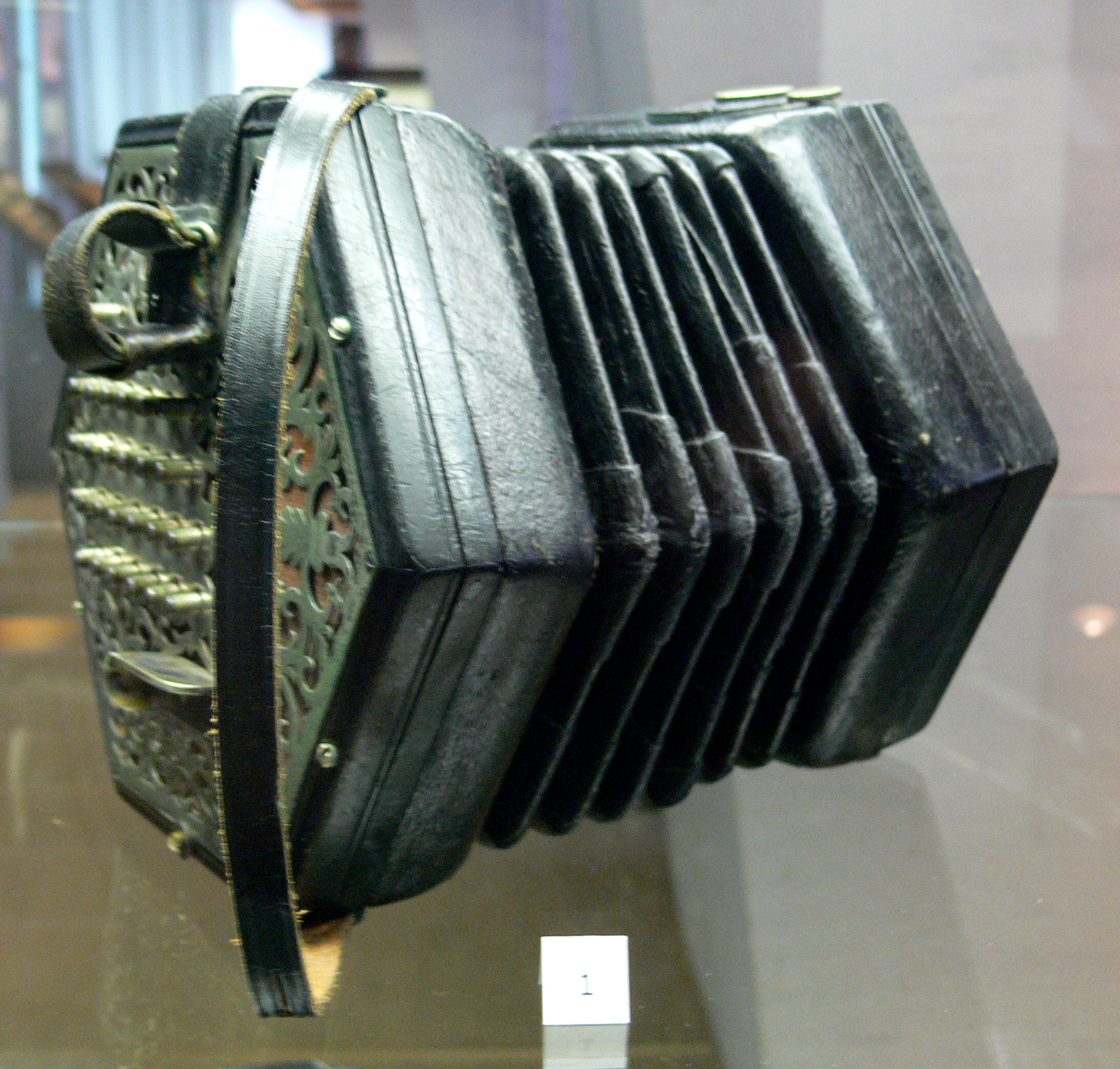
Concertina made by Lachenal & Co. circa 1900

Lachenal & Co. was a British firm producing concertinas from approximately 1850–1936. The firm was founded by Louis L. Lachenal (c. 1821–1861), a Swiss emigrant to the United Kingdom, who arrived there in 1839, and by 1844 was working in support of the famous Wheatstone concertina firm before founding a supporting contract firm and by 1858, an independent firm.

Lachenal's innovations in concertina production led his company to become one of the most prolific concertina producers of the era.

== See also ==
- Marie Lachenal, concertinist and daughter of Louis Lachenal
