= Concertina =

Free-reed musical instrument

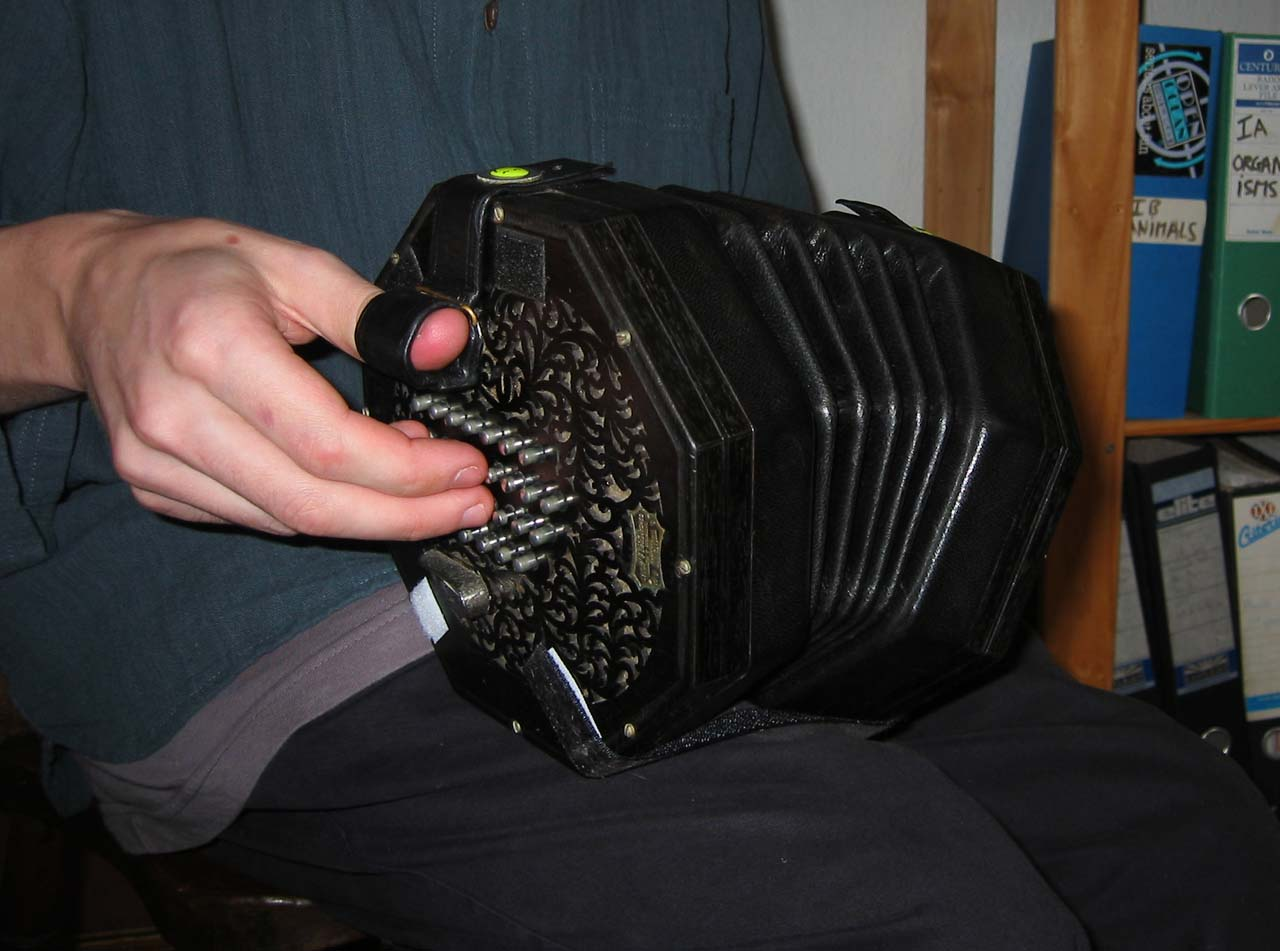
- An English concertina, produced c. 1920

Other instrument
- Hornbostel–Sachs classification: 412.132 (Free-reed instrument – Sets of free reeds)
- Inventors: Sir Charles Wheatstone; Carl Friedrich Uhlig
- Developed: 1829 (Wheatstone); 1834 (Uhlig)

Related instruments
- Accordion; Harmonica; Melodeon

Sound sample
- Alexander Prince playing Scotch Reels on a concertina (1909)

A concertina is a free-reed musical instrument, like the various accordions and the harmonica. It consists of expanding and contracting bellows, with buttons (or keys) usually on both ends, unlike accordion buttons, which are on the front.

The concertina was developed independently in both England and Germany. The English concertina was invented in 1829 by Sir Charles Wheatstone, while Carl Friedrich Uhlig introduced the German concertina five years later, in 1834. Various forms of concertina are used for classical music; for the traditional music of Ireland, England, and South Africa; and for tango and polka music.

Due to the concertina's small and compact size, it has historically been a common instrument among itinerants, such as soldiers, sailors, and cowboys. One was even brought aboard Robert Peary's expedition to Greenland in 1891–92. Despite its association with the Golden Age of Piracy in popular culture, it was invented roughly a century later.

== Systems ==
Concertinas are members of a family of hand-held bellows-driven free reed instruments constructed according to various systems which differ in terms of keyboard layout and whether individual buttons (keys) produce the same (unisonoric) or different (bisonoric) notes with changes in the direction of air pressure.

Because the concertina was developed nearly contemporaneously in England and Germany, systems can be broadly divided into English, Anglo-German, and German types. To a player proficient in one of these systems, a concertina of a different system will be quite unfamiliar.

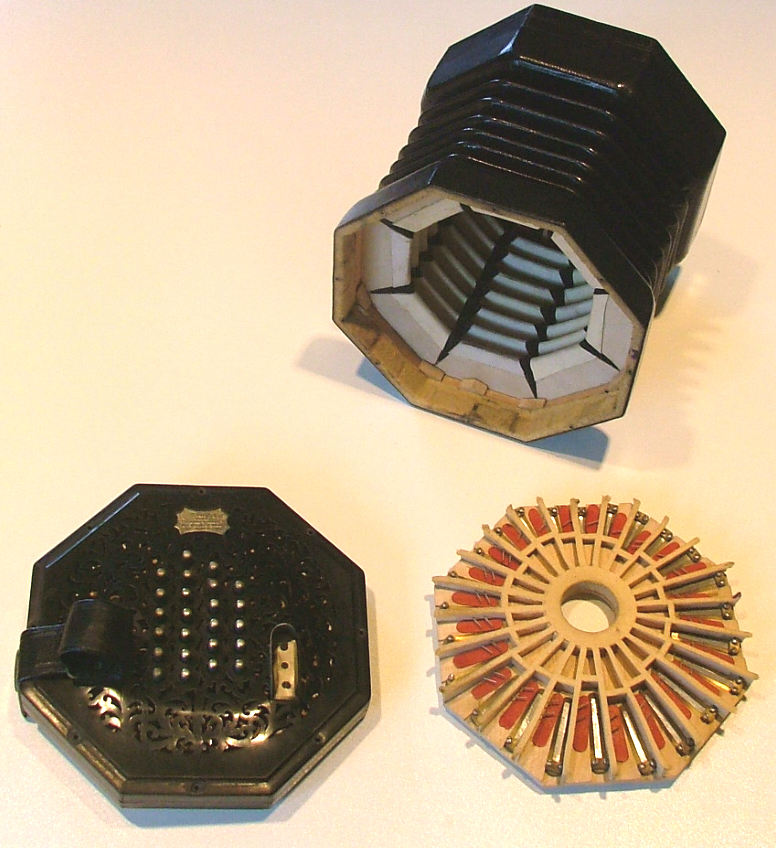
English concertina disassembled, showing bellows, reedpan and buttons

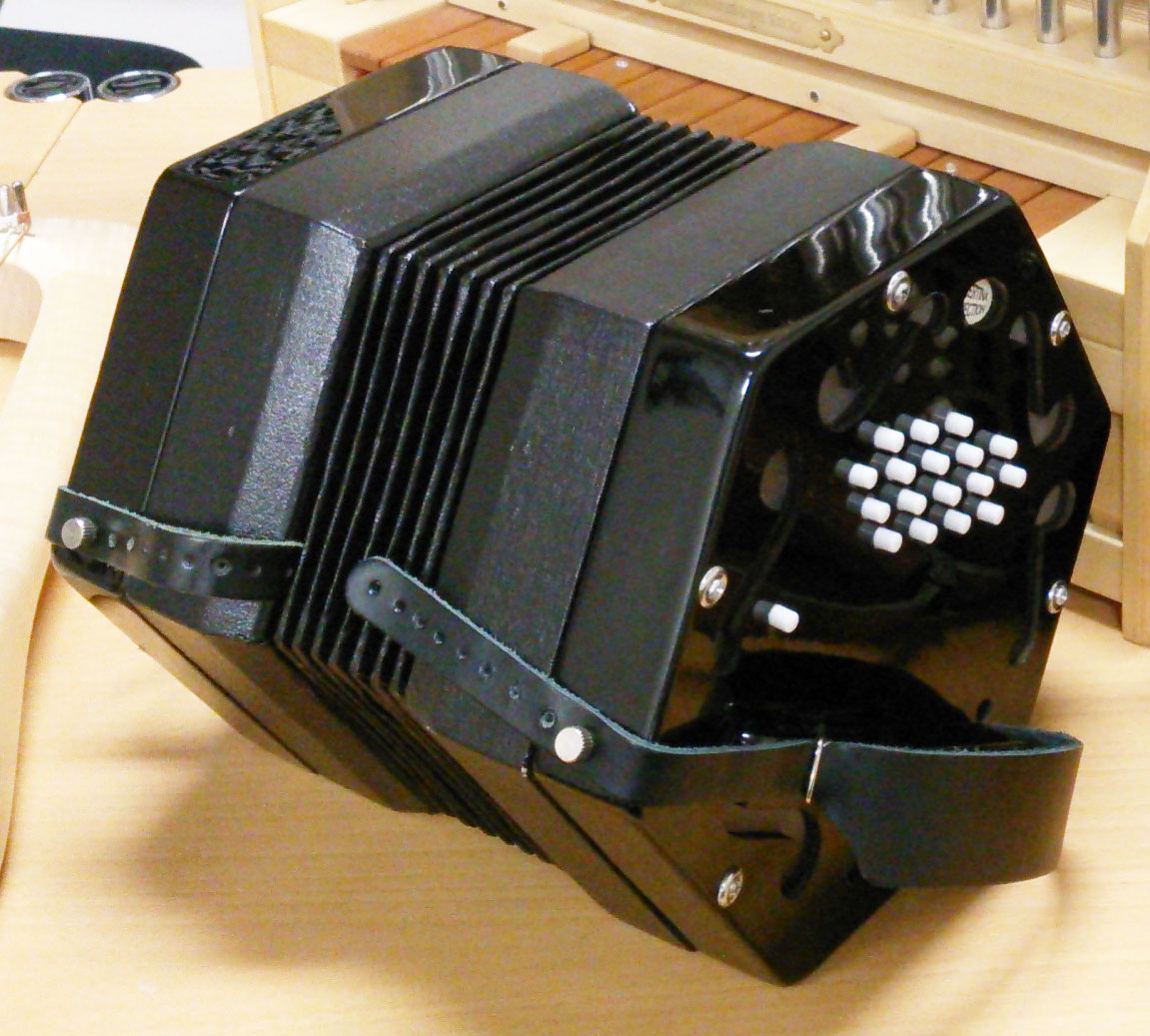
Hayden Duet Concertina

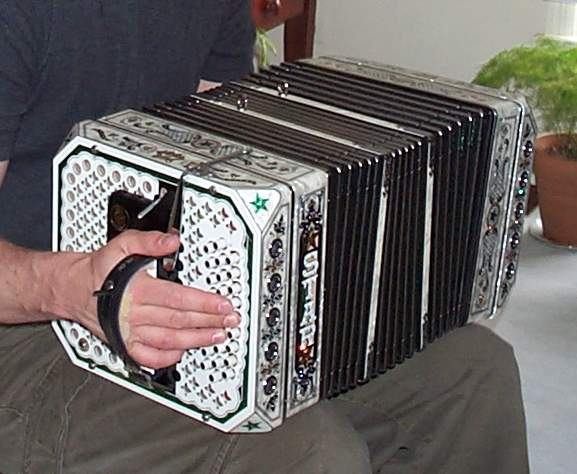
Chemnitzer concertina made by Star Mfg., Cicero, Illinois, USA in 2000

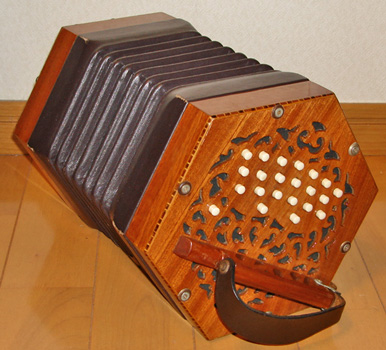
Bastari 40-button Anglo concertina

=== English and Duet concertinas ===
The English concertina and the Duet concertina bear similarities in history and construction. Both systems generally play a chromatic scale and are unisonoric, with each key producing the same note whether the bellows are being pushed or pulled. Both of these English instruments are smaller than German concertinas, and are usually hexagonal in shape, though occasionally featuring 8, 10, or 12 sides. The English system alternates the notes of the scale between two hands, enabling rapid melodies. The duet system features the lower notes on the left, and higher notes on the right, facilitating the playing of interlaced harmonies and melodies.

The English concertina is credited to Sir Charles Wheatstone, who first patented such a design in 1829 in Great Britain. Wheatstone was also the first to patent a duet concertina, in 1844.

=== German concertinas ===
German concertinas, developed in Germany for its local market and diaspora, are usually larger than English concertinas, and are generally bisonoric, using a different style of "long plate" reeds, and are often square, as opposed to hexagonal. German concertinas also sometimes have more than one reed per note, which produces a vibrato effect if their tuning differs slightly .

==== Chemnitzer concertina ====
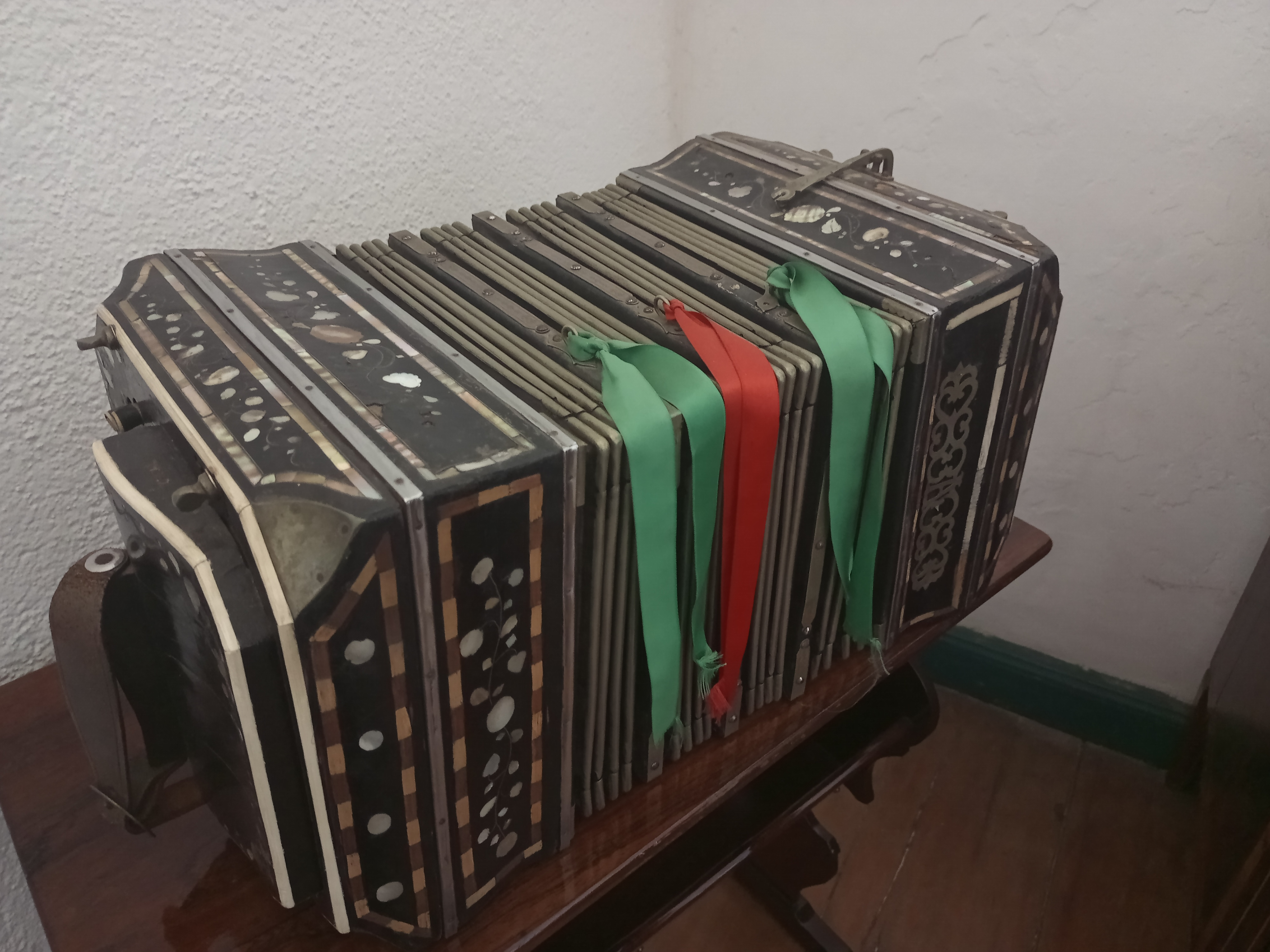

Various German concertina systems share common construction features and core keyboard layout. In the United States, particularly in the Midwest where there are many German and Central European descendants, the term concertina often refers to the Chemnitzer concertina, which is bisonoric and closely related to the bandoneon, but features a different keyboard layout and decorative style, including a few mechanical innovations pioneered by German-American instrument builder and inventor Otto Schlicht. A related variant is the Carlsfelder concertina from C. F. Zimmerman, created in 1849 and shown at the 1851 London Industrial Exposition. The Chemnitzer concertina is popular among polka musicians in the American Midwest, most famously played by Li'l Wally.

==== Bandoneon ====
The bandoneon (also rendered bandoneón, bandonion) is a German concertina system with an original bisonoric layout devised by Heinrich Band. Although intended as a substitute for the organ in small churches and chapels, it was soon secularized and is now associated with tango music due to the instrument's popularity in Argentina since the late 19th century when tango developed from various dance styles in Argentina and Uruguay. Though the typical bandoneon is bisonoric, the 1920s saw the development of unisonoric variants such as the Ernst Kusserow and Charles Peguri systems, both introduced around 1925. Bandoneons typically have more than one reed per button, dry-tuned with the reeds an octave apart. "Dry" means that vibrato is absent because the tuning is accurate. The instrument is considered an essential part of the Argentine tango orchestra.

=== Anglo concertina ===
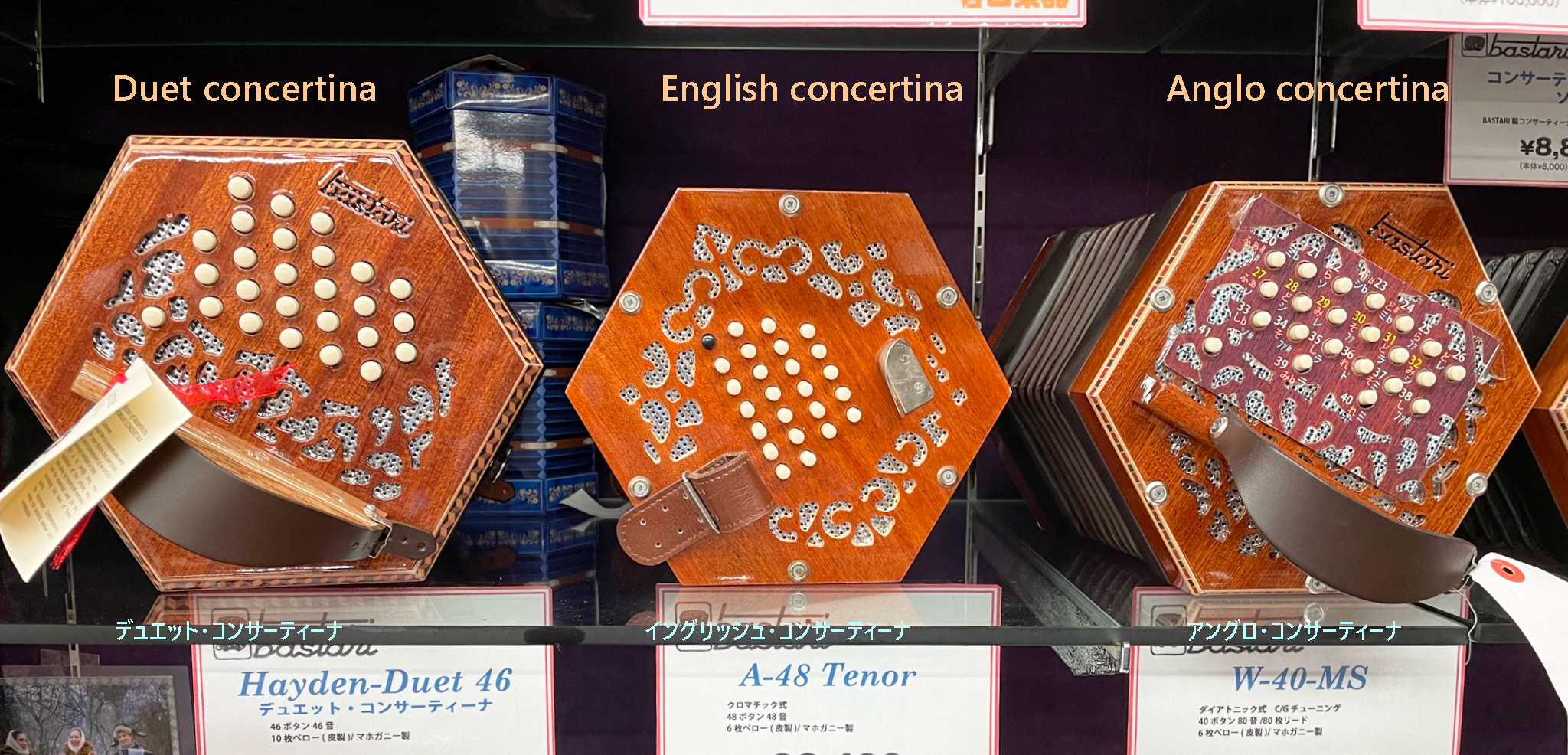
Duet concertina, English concertina, Anglo concertina

The Anglo or Anglo-German concertina is, historically, a hybrid between the English and German concertinas. The button layouts are generally the same as the original 20-button German concertinas designed by Uhlig in 1834, and in a bisonoric system. Within a few years of its invention, the German concertina was a popular import in England, Ireland, and North America, due to its ease of use and relatively low price. English manufacturers responded to this popularity by offering their own versions using traditional English methods: concertina reeds instead of long-plate reeds, independent pivots for each button, and hexagon-shaped ends, resulting in the modern Anglo concertina.

=== Franglo ===
The "Franglo" system concertina was developed by the luthiers C & R Dipper, in cooperation with Emmanuel Pariselle, known for his expertise as a professional player of the two-and-a-half row diatonic melodeon. The system has the construction and reed-work of a concertina with the buttons at the sides, but the layout of the buttons is that of a melodeon. The name Franglo blends the words French and Anglo.

== Gallery ==
The Blind Girl (1856)

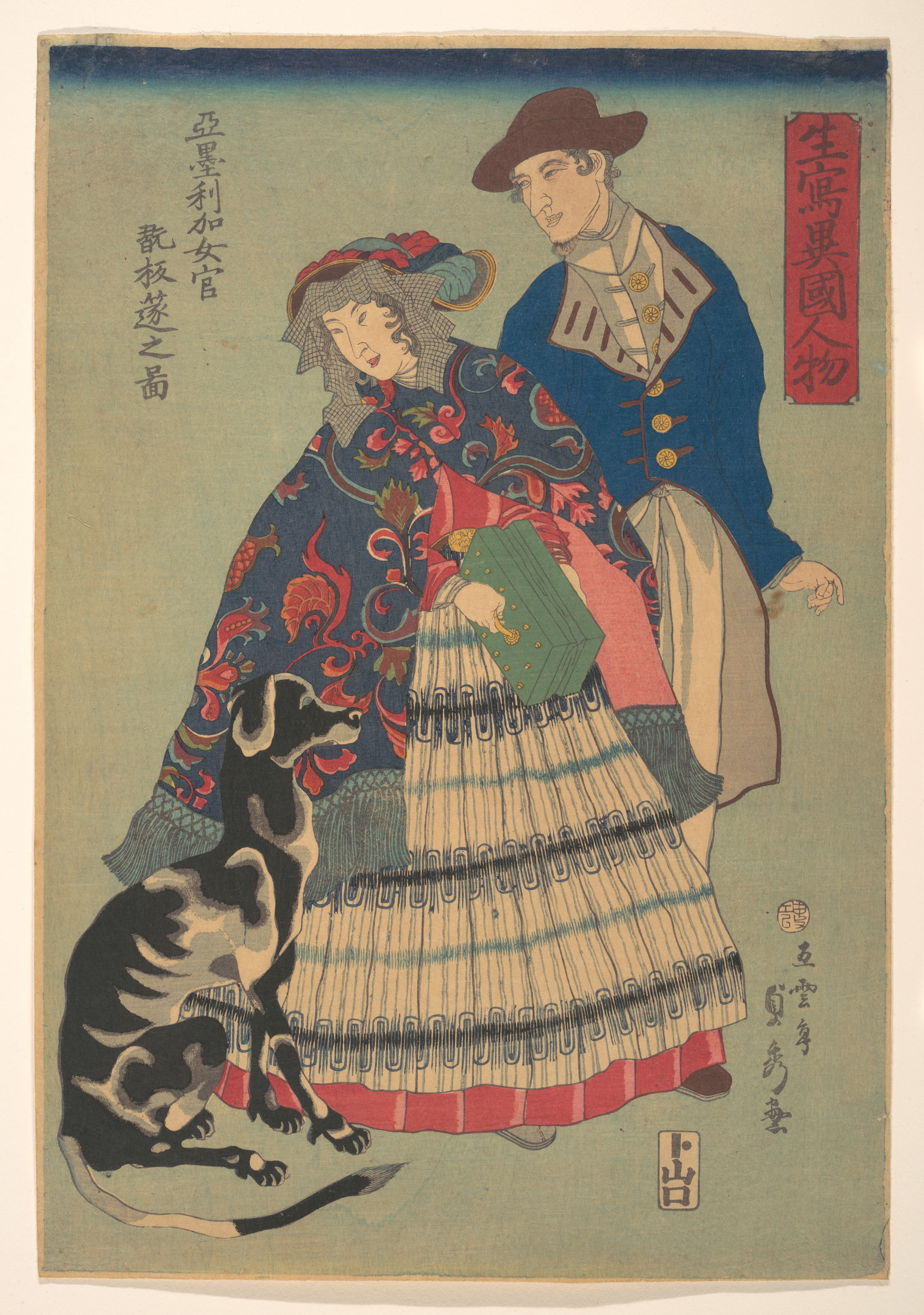
American Woman Playing a Concertina (1860)

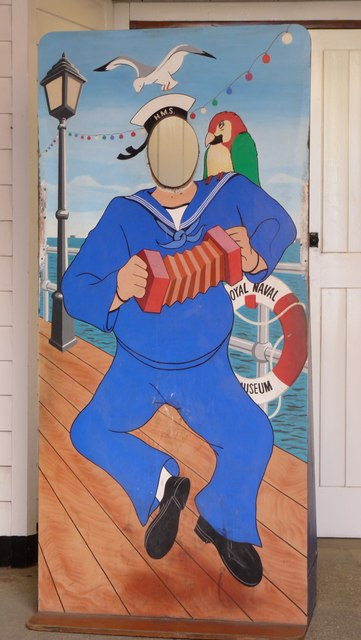
Sailor's concertina

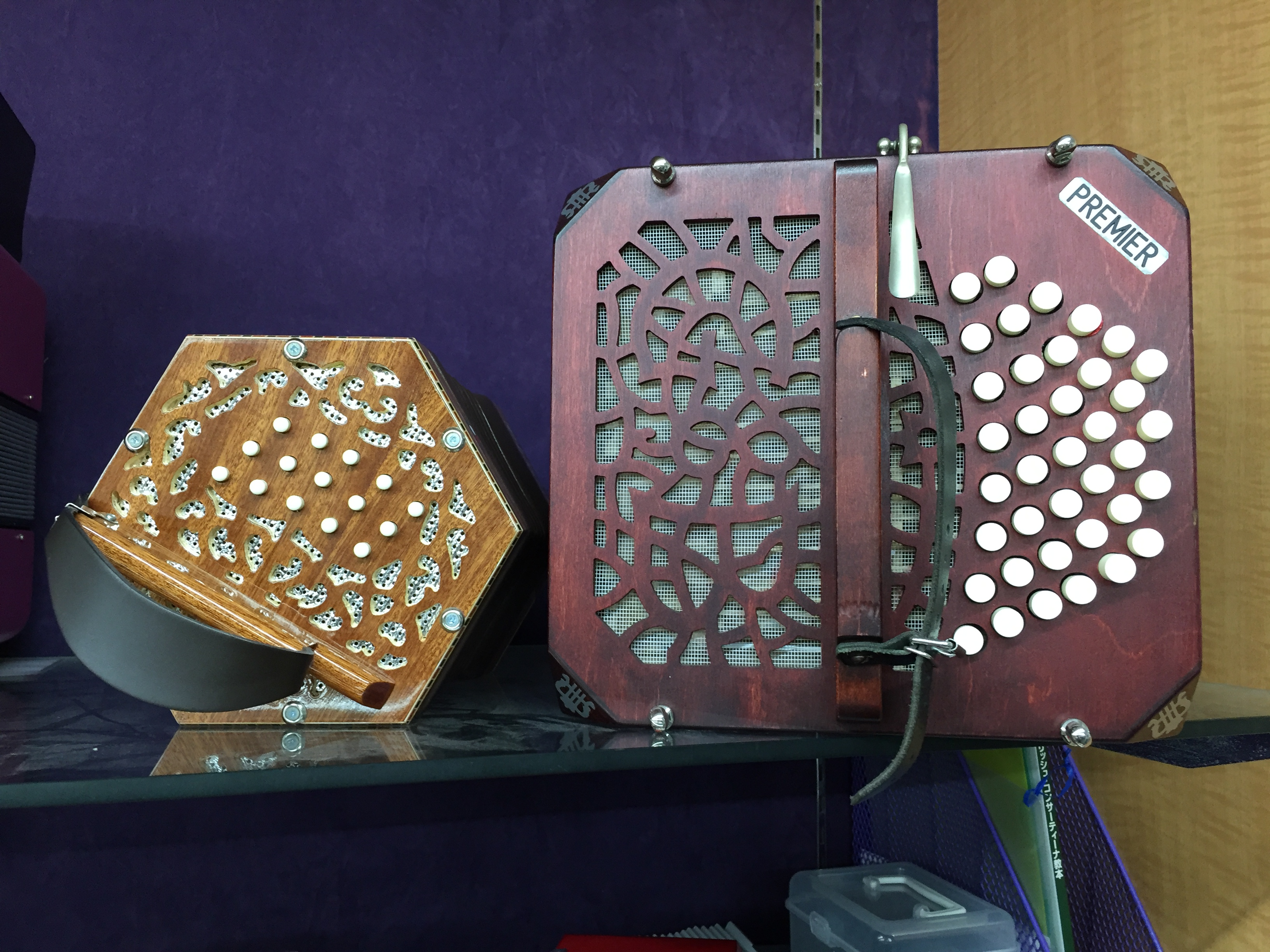
The Anglo concertina and the bandoneon

== History ==
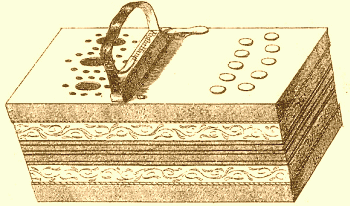
German concertina, mid 19th century

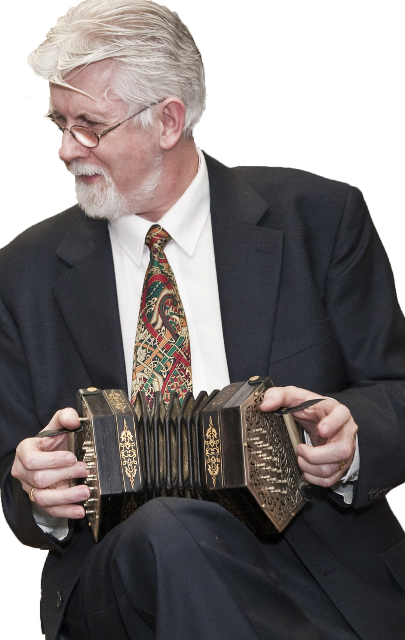
Irish historian Gearóid Ó hAllmhuráin

=== 19th century ===
In the mid-1830s concertinas were manufactured and sold in Germany and England, in two types specific to the country. Both systems continued to evolve into the current forms as the popularity of the instrument increased. The difference in prices and the common uses of the English and German systems led to something of a class distinction between the two. German or Anglo-German concertinas were regarded as a lower-class instrument while the English concertina had an air of bourgeois respectability. English concertinas were most popular as parlor instruments for classical music, while German concertinas were more associated with the popular dance music at that time.

In the 1850s, the Anglo-German concertina's ability to play both melody and accompaniment led English manufacturers to start developing the various duet systems. The popular Maccann system was developed towards the end of the century; meanwhile, German manufacturers were producing concertinas with more than 20 keys for local sale. Three keyboard systems for German concertinas eventually became popular: Uhlig's Chemnitzer system, Carl Zimmerman's Carlsfeld system, and the Bandoneon's Reinische system. Various German manufacturers tried to develop a single unified keyboard system for all German concertinas, but this was only partially accomplished by the end of the 19th century, when the Chemnitzer and Carlsfelder systems merged into the unified concertina system, and a unified bandoneon system was created. Despite the new standards, the older systems remained popular into the 20th century.

The concertina was popular throughout the 19th century. The Salvation Army in England, America, Australia, and New Zealand commonly used concertinas in their bands, and other concertina bands and musicians performed in all parts of the English-speaking world. German emigrants brought their Chemnitzers and bandoneons with them to the United States and Argentina where they became regionally popular.

=== Early 20th century ===
In the early 20th century, the concertina's popularity rapidly declined as demand for the accordion increased, along with mass production of other instruments such as the piano which are more suited to chromatic forms of music like blues and jazz. By the middle of the century, few concertina makers remained, and most of those used accordion reeds and inexpensive, unreliable keyboard mechanisms. Yet, the various forms of concertina survived in some areas: Anglo concertinas in Irish traditional music, the English and the Anglo in English Morris dancing, the Anglo in Africa, among Afrikaners (see Boer music) and Zulus (who call it a "squashbox"), the Chemnitzer in the United States as a polka instrument, and the bandoneon in Argentina as a prominent part of the tango tradition. Between World War I and World War II, there were many concertina and bandoneon bands in Germany, but with the rise of the Nazi regime these musical clubs disappeared.

=== Folk revival and present ===
The folk revival movements of the 1960s led to a modest resurgence in the popularity of the concertina, particularly the Anglo. More recently, concertina popularity again seems on the rise, particularly the Anglo in the traditional music of Ireland and England. Renewed interest in tango since the 1980s has also seen interest in the bandoneon increase. American country/folk musician Willi Carlisle has been introducing the concertina (along with the button accordion) into American country music, reflecting a general resurgence of accordions in American music as well.

Traditional music playing continues in many parts of the UK in the 21st century, often using English and Anglo-system concertinas. Concertinas are mass-produced in Italy and China, and are produced by individual workshops in Europe, South Africa, Australia, and North America. Modern-made instruments are in a spectrum of quality and traditionalism, with the most expensive instruments using traditional concertina-type reeds, while mid-level and inexpensive instruments take advantage of the lower price of mass-produced accordion reeds.

== See also ==
- List of All-Ireland concertina champions
- Category:Composers for concertina
