= Boeremusiek =

South African music style

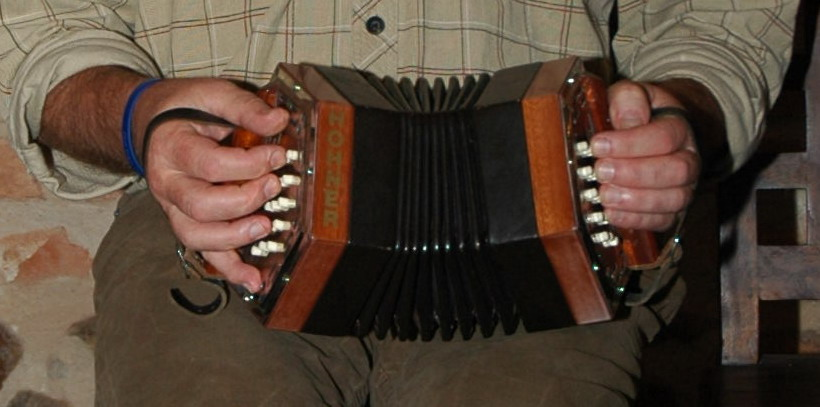
Concertina

Boeremusiek (Afrikaans: ‘Boer music’) is a type of South African instrumental folk music. Its original intent was to be an accompaniment to social dancing at parties and festivals.

== History ==
Boeremusiek is originally European, but once it was brought to South Africa and Namibia, it gradually changed and became its own style.

== Style ==
A concertina is similar to an accordion and is the lead instrument in most Boeremusiek bands. There are many different types of concertinas, which is why Boeremusiek has so many unique sounds and styles, and the construction the concertina is what makes the different sounds in the Boeremusiek band; it depends on where the slots and holes are put makes the difference on the sound that the concertina makes.

A Boeremusiek band may include piano accordions, button harmonicas, accordions, pianos, harmoniums and the guitar, and sometimes, a cello or bass guitar may be seen.

The sound of a Boeremusiek band may depend on what region the band is from (for example, Boeremusiek in Potchefstroom can differ from ones in Stellenbosch), seeing that Boermusiek's intent is to be informal, instrumental dance music.

Today, there are many successful Boeremusiek bands that have recorded albums. Some famous bands and individual artists today include Klipwerf Boereorkes, Danie Grey, Nico Carstens, Taffie Kikkilus, Brian Nieuwoudt, Samuel Petzer, Worsie Visser and Die Ghitaar Man.
