= Noir Désir discography =

- Studio albums: 6
- Live albums: 3
- Compilation albums: 4
- Singles: 13

Noir Désir, a French rock group, have released six studio albums, thirteen singles, two live albums, one live DVD, four compilation albums, and one remix album.

In 1985 Noir Désir were signed up by Barclay Records, releasing the mini-album Ou veux-tu que je r'garde two years later. In 1989 they had a break through success with their debut full-length album Veuillez rendre l'âme (à qui elle appartient), which contained the hit single Aux sombres héros de l'amer. They went on to release the less successful album Du ciment sous les plaines in 1991, but in 1992 Tostaky gained enormous critical acclaim and was a commercial hit as well.

In 1994 the group released their first live album Dies Irae. In 1996 they released the very successful 666.667 Club which was certified double platinum and has sold over a million copies. The group released an album of remixes of their work in 1998 and then in September 2001 released their sixth studio album Des visages des figures, selling over a million copies and taking only two months to go double platinum. They released a second live album and a live DVD in 2005, Noir Désir En Public and Noir Désir En Images respectively.

== Studio albums ==
Year	Album details	Peak chart positions				Certifications (sales thresholds)
Year	Album details	FRA	BEL (Wa)	ITA	SWI	Certifications (sales thresholds)
1987	Où veux tu qu'je r'garde?: Released: 1987; Label: Barclay	—	—	—	—	
1989	Veuillez rendre l'âme (à qui elle appartient): Released: 29 January 1989; Label: Barclay (831484)	36	—	—	—	FR: Gold
1991	Du ciment sous les plaines: Released: March 1991; Label: Barclay (831484)	109	—	—	—	FR: Gold
1992	Tostaky: Released: January 1992; Label: Barclay (5490922)	40	—	—	—	FR: Gold
1996	666.667 Club: Released: 8 November 1996; Label: Polydor (533442)	1	9	—	—	FR: 2×Platinum
2001	Des visages des figures: Released: 11 September 2001; Label: Polygram (5892752)	1	1	7	2	FR: 2×Platinum
"—" denotes releases that did not chart or were not released in that territory.

== Live recordings ==
Year	Album details	Peak chart positions		
Year	Album details	FRA	BEL (Wa)	SWI
1994	Dies Irae: Released: 27 January 1994; Label: Mercury (9845017)	149	—	—
2004	Nous n'avons fait que fuir: Released: 10 June 2004 (recorded in 2002); Label: ND Musique; Éditions Verticales	—	—	—
2005	Noir Désir en public: Released: 19 September 2005; Label: Barclay (31526)	1	2	4
2005	Noir Désir en images (DVD): Released: 19 September 2005; Label: Barclay (31526); Format:DVD	—	—	30
2020	Débranché: Released: 24 January 2020; Label: Barclay	134	96	—
"—" denotes releases that did not chart or were not released in that territory.

== Compilation albums ==
Year	Album details	Peak chart positions		
Year	Album details	FRA	BEL (Wa)	SWI
1994	Compilation: Released: 1994; Notes: Only released in Germany	—	—	—
1998	One Trip/One Noise: Released: 15 December 1998; Label: Polydor (559187)	25	—	—
2000	En route pour la joie: Released: January 2000; Label: Barclay (31526)	73	—	—
2011	Soyons désinvoltes, n'ayons l'air de rien: Released: 28 November 2011; Label: Barclay (278887-5) and (278 770-0)	3	16	75
"—" denotes releases that did not chart or were not released in that territory.

== Singles ==
Year	Title	Peak chart positions			Album
Year	Title	FRA	BEL (Wa)	ITA	Album
1987	"Où veux-tu qu'je r'garde ?"	—	—	—	Où veux-tu qu'je r'garde ?
1987	"Toujours être ailleurs"	—	—	—	Où veux-tu qu'je r'garde ?
1989	"Aux sombres héros de l'amer"	31	—	—	Veuillez rendre l'âme (à qui elle appartient)
1989	"Les Écorchés"	—	—	—	Veuillez rendre l'âme (à qui elle appartient)
1992	"Tostaky"	21	—	—	Tostaky
1993	"Lolita nie en bloc"	38	—	—	Tostaky
1993	"Ici Paris"	—	—	—	Tostaky
1994	"Marlène (live)"	—	—	—	Dies Irae
1996	"Un jour en France"	—	—	—	666.667 Club
1997	"À ton étoile"	—	—	—	666.667 Club
1997	"L'Homme pressé"	15	—	—	666.667 Club
1998	"Fin de siècle (G.L.Y.O.)"	—	—	—	One Trip/One Noise
2001	"Le vent nous portera"	3	7	1	Des visages des figures
2002	"Lost"	50	—	—	Des visages des figures
2020	"A l'envers á l'endroit (live)"	—	—	—	Débranché
2020	"Imbécile"	—	—	—	
"—" denotes releases that did not chart or were not released in that territory.
