= Noir Désir en public =

Live album by Noir Désir
- Released: 19 September 2005
- Recorded: 2002
- Genre: Rock
- Length: 2:16:51
- Label: Barclay Records
- Producer: Noir Désir

Noir Désir chronology
des Visages des Figures (2001)	Noir Désir en public (2005)	Débranché (2020)

Professional ratings
Review scores
Source	Rating
Allmusic	(not evaluated)

Noir Désir en public is a live album by French rock band Noir Désir, released on 19 September 2005. It documents their last tour in 2002.

== Track listing ==
- All titles by Bertrand Cantat/Noir Désir except where noted.

=== Disc 1 ===
No.	Title	Length
1.	"Si rien ne bouge"	7:46
2.	"Septembre en attendant"	5:19
3.	"One Trip/One Noise"	8:26
4.	"À l'envers à l'endroit"	3:41
5.	"Les Écorchés"	3:20
6.	"Le Grand Incendie"	7:07
7.	"Le Fleuve"	8:38
8.	"La Chaleur"	3:44
9.	"Des armes (lyrics by Léo Ferré)"	3:47
10.	"Ernestine"	4:57
11.	"Tostaky"	5:32
12.	"Lazy"	7:30

=== Disc 2 ===
No.	Title	Length
1.	"Pyromane"	5:12
2.	"À l'arrière des taxis"	5:42
3.	"Lolita nie en bloc"	3:57
4.	"L'Homme pressé"	3:54
5.	"Des visages des figures"	7:14
6.	"Bouquet de nerfs"	3:55
7.	"Le vent nous portera"	4:34
8.	"21st Century Schizoid Man (Peter Sinfield / Robert Fripp / Greg Lake / Ian McDonald / Michael Giles) - (cover of King Crimson)"	5:44
9.	"Ces gens-là (cover of Jacques Brel)"	6:14
10.	"Comme elle vient"	4:35
11.	"À ton étoile"	6:20
12.	"Ce n'est pas moi qui clame (Gabor Kardos / Noir Désir / Christophe Perruchi) - (poem by Attila József)"	9:43

== Credits ==
- Denis Barthe: drums, samples, background vocals
- Bertrand Cantat: guitar, harmonica, lead vocals
- Jean-Paul Roy: bass guitar, keyboards, background vocals
- Serge Teyssot-Gay: guitar, keyboards, background vocals
- Christophe Perruchi: keyboards, samples, background vocals
- Akosh Szelevényi: clarinet on Le vent nous portera
- Isabelle Sajot: cello on Bouquet de nerfs, Le Fleuve and Des visages des figures
- Vincent Debruyne: viola on Bouquet de nerfs, Le Fleuve and Des visages des figures
- Dominique Juchors: violin on Bouquet de nerfs, Le Fleuve and Des visages des figures
- Anne Lepape: violin on Bouquet de nerfs, Le Fleuve and Des visages des figures
- Romain Humeau: strings arrangements on Des visages des figures
- Joe Mardin: strings arrangements on Bouquet de nerfs and Le Fleuve
- Recording: Bob Coke with assistance from François Brely
- Direction: Noir Désir
- Mixing: Noir Désir and Bob Coke
- Mastering: Alexis Bardinet, Denis Barthe and Bob Coke

== Charts ==
Chart (2005)	Peak position
Belgium	2
Europe	15
France	1
Italy	8
Switzerland	4
