= Eiffel (band) =

French pop-rock band

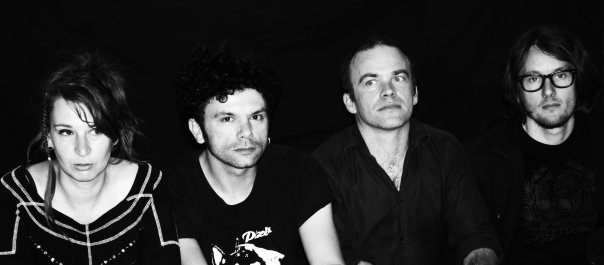
- Eiffel (2009); left to right: Estelle Humeau, Romain Humeau, Nicolas Courret and Nicolas Bonnière

Background information
- Origin: France
- Genre: rock
- Years active: 1998–
- Label: PIAS
- Members: Romain Humeau; Estelle Humeau; Nicolas Bonnière; Nicolas Courret
- Past members: Nicolas Courret (1998-2002); Xavier Bray (2002); Damien Lefèvre (1998-2005); Emiliano Turi (2002-2006); Hugo Cechosz (2005-2008); Christophe Gratien (2006-2008)
- Website: www.eiffelnews.com

Eiffel is a French rock group founded in 1998 around Romain Humeau.

Their influences range from the Pixies to Léo Ferré, encompassing Jacques Brel, Sonic Youth, Serge Gainsbourg, The Buzzcocks, Noir Désir, the Stooges, David Bowie, Sixteen Horsepower, the Kinks, the Beatles, Tears For Fears, Fugazi, XTC, Deus, and also Boris Vian and Louis Calaferte.

Their name comes from a song by the Pixies named "Alec Eiffel" on the album Trompe Le Monde.

== Members ==
The group is currently composed of:

* Romain Humeau – vocals, guitar, songwriter
* Estelle Humeau – bass, supporting vocals, keyboards, flute, melodica, guitar
* Nicolas Bonnière – guitar, supporting vocals
* Nicolas Courret – drums, percussion, supporting vocals

Former members:

- Nicolas Courret – drums, percussion, supporting vocals (1998–2002)
- Xavier Bray – drums, percussion (2002)
- Damien Lefèvre – bass, supporting vocals (1998–2005)
- Emiliano Turi – drums, percussion (2002–2006)
- Hugo Cechosz – bass, vocals (2005–2008)
- Christophe Gratien – drums, percussion (2006–2008)

== Biography ==
=== Beginnings ===
It was after serious differences with his record label (Warner Music Group) that the group Eiffel was born in February 1998 from the ashes of Oobik & The Pucks, a group formed in September 1995 which was composed of Romain Humeau, Estelle Humeau, Frédéric Vitani and Nicolas Courret. Disgusted by how the record company managed the group, bassist Frédéric Vitani left and gave his place to Damien Lefèvre.

Still animated by the same energy, the group worked on its new repertory, dedicating itself to concerts until December (the Flèche d'Or, the Blueser, the Péniche Makara, the Kiosque Flottant, the squat at the Grange aux Belles...) and then undertook to record the EP L'Affaire in a cellar in Paris, in Saint-Michel.

Romain Humeau dedicated himself completely to the recording and production:

"We were determined not to record the instruments in a crude way but rather to perfect the sound. Unfortunately, many engineers don't take the time to do this. We didn't want a flat, sterile sound, but rather an acid one, even if that was disturbing to the ear."

In January 1999, the EP was commercially distributed and the group then began a tedious tour throughout France, alternating between festivals, bars and cafés. The group was then completely independent: Nicolas Courret handled the CD artwork, Damien Lefèvre concerts, Estelle Humeau fanzines and Romain Humeau relations with the press. Romain also arranged some pieces at this time for 1, 2, 3 Soleils and Helena Noguerra.

In May 1999, the group was noticed by Peter Von Poehl and Bertrand Burgalat, who were looking for musicians to back Michel Houellebecq: "Bertrand Burgalat discovered us like that. We managed to do a concert at MCM Café, and he came to see us. He spoke about us to some record companies. We were indebted to him a fair amount then. " (Romain Humeau, March 2006)

In July, after a few concerts with Michel Houellebecq (The Aquaplanning festival and La Route du Rock), Roman and Damien Nicolas worked on Houellebecq's album Présence Humaine, including writing the music for the title track on the album, as well as for another track, "Plein été".

Eiffel set out again for nearly a year, almost always remaining sequestered and recording various pieces that began to circulate through the musical world. They were contacted by the record label Labels, with which they signed in May 2000. They went on tour again, alongside Dionysos and Papas Fritas.

In July, the band recorded a series of pieces in a cellar and a barn, songs that give rise to the EP Abricotine & Quality Street, which was released in August. The piece "Te revoir" had some success and allowed them to shoot a music video directed by Henri-Jean Debon. Romain Humeau: "What we liked about him was that he knew how to expand sounds and words with images without necessarily sticking a story onto them."

During the next six months, the group polished the pieces that give birth to their first album.

=== Abricotine and Le Quart d'heure des ahuris ===
Eiffel's first album, Abricotine, was released on 9 January 2001. The acid sound and surrealist lyrics, already present on their EPs, were the hallmarks of this album, which included, among other pieces, "Te revoir", "Hype", and also "Je voudrais pas crever", a poem written by Boris Vian which the group set to music. Also, in the same year, Romain Humeau arranged the strings for the Noir Désir song "Des visages, des figures", on the album of the same name.

An extensive tour of around a hundred dates across France followed, including Printemps de Bourges and the Fête de l'Humanité but also the Boule Noire, Le Trabendo and the Elysée-Montmartre. The group took a break in December before starting the recording of their second album, Le Quart d'heure des ahuris (again written, composed, arranged, recorded and mixed by Roman Humeau) in February 2002 at Arconques.

In August, the departure of drummer Nicolas Courret was announced; he was replaced by Xavier Bray.

The album was released on 10 September. The sound was more direct, saturated with guitars, the mood dark and hypnotic; its theme was the loss of direction as well as Death. Even if the music was less harmonically rich than previous productions, the lyrics were still good. Notable singles were "Au néant", "Tu vois loin" and "T'as tout, tu profites de rien". The group set out again on what should have been a small breaking-in tour for their new album; this tour eventually included 32 dates, some of which were shared with Nada Surf.

In March 2003, a clip was filmed for "Tu vois loin" by Mathieu Amalric at the Gare de l'Est.

In April, Xavier Bray left the group, who then engaged Emiliano Turi, Italian-born jazz drummer. The group then decided to select a few dates between July and December 2003 to record a DVD and a live double album. They took advantage of three concerts at the Maroquinerie (9, 10 and 11 December) to record one of the two discs of the album, accompanied by a string quartet, as well as two oboists.

=== Les Yeux fermés and L'Éternité de l'instant ===
In March 2004, the double album Les Yeux fermés as well as a DVD of their 2003 concert at Eurockéennes were available for sale. The members of Eiffel were exhausted and decided to take a break before going back to work. Romain Humeau took the opportunity to release a solo album,L'Éternité De L'Instant, while Damien Lefèvre left to record the bass on the second album by Luke.

In 2005, in the middle of his tour for his solo album, Romain Humeau announced the final departure from Eiffel of Damien Lefevre (who, as of now, is still bassist for Luke.)

=== Tandoori ===
Emiliano Turi, Estelle and Romain Humeau met during the summer of 2006, accompanied by Hugo Cechosz (bassist during the solo tour of Romain Humeau) to record the third album by Eiffel, Tandoori. Scarcely after the recording was finished, Emiliano Turi announced his departure to participate in Jeanne Cherhal's next tour. Christophe Gratien, a friend of Hugo, was recruited for the emergency to provide the drum part throughout the upcoming tour.

The album release was preceded by that of a digital EP (released 20 November) which gave its name to the first single from the album, "Ma part d'ombre". Again, the emphasis is on lyrics, more and more committed, violent and incisive, calling for fundamental changes, in lifestyle, values and the political system.

The album was recorded quickly, and the sound was plainer than in their previous productions, though still very rock. Tandoori included 16 tracks whose length did not exceed an average of three minutes, with the exception of the bravura piece "Bigger Than the Biggest".

The group gave a warm-up mini-tour late 2006 before starting the official tour, which began after the album was in stores, on 15 January 2007. During the next six months, Eiffel appeared at some dates before having conflicts with their record label (Virgin Music, which was bought by EMI), concerning the promotion of the album. Eiffel had to honor a fourth studio album for EMI, but given the number of album sales (about 10,000 at the time), Philippe Ascoli (new boss of EMI France since April 2007) offered them a choice of either having him listen to new demos, or breaking their contract. The group chose the second option and ended their tour on 22 November 2007 with a concert in Le Bikini in Toulouse, after a memorable concert at the Olympia on 19 November, and then plunged into almost complete silence for the next eight months.

=== À tout moment ===
On 12 November 2008, a song was announced on the Eiffel website as available to Internet users for free download. This song, "Le Temps des cerises", recorded in one night, was the result of a collaboration between Romain Humeau (drums), Estelle Humeau (bass), Serge Teyssot-Gay (guitar) and Bertrand Cantat (vocals), the last two from the group Noir Désir.

Romain Humeau described the experience in these terms: "'Le Temps des cerises' comes first and foremost from a deep friendship. From a shared excitement for music as well. Instinct and urgency naturally flourished in the short space-time, hardly 24 hours long, in which we were transported and captured the piece ...live on the spot and without a net."

Bertrand Cantat was also found as a guest on the fourth studio album by Eiffel, where he provided backing vocals. Entitled À tout moment, the album was released 5 October 2009, preceded by the single "À tout moment la rue", released on the official site and broadcast on the radio.

The recording was done without Christophe Hugo and Cechosz Gratian, who had left the group to concentrate on their blues/rock duo, the Twinsisters. Nicolas Courret, original drummer of the band, returned to his post, with Estelle Humeau as bassist. To complete the group for concerts, guitarist Nicolas Bonnière, former member of Dolly, was recruited.

After a concert on 12 September at the Chant du Gros festival in Switzerland, the group launched itself on a tour, starting 29 October at Saint-Étienne.

== Discography ==
=== Albums ===
Studio

- 2001: Abricotine (EMI 850696)
- 2002: Le Quart d'heure des ahuris (EMI/Virgin 8132452)
- 2007: Tandoori (EMI 384801)
- 2009: À tout moment
- 2012: Foule monstre
- 2019: Stupor machine

Live

- 2004: Les Yeux fermés (double album) (Labels 576607)

=== EPs ===
- 1999: L'Affaire (EP)
- 2000: Abricotine & Quality Street (EP)
- 2006: Ma Part D'Ombre (EP)

=== DVDs ===
- 2004: Live aux Eurockéennes de Belfort 2003

== Discography: Oobik & The Pucks ==
- 1996 : Cogito Ergo Destrugere (EP)
- 1996 : Oobik & The Pucks
