= Le bon roi Dagobert =

Le bon roi Dagobert ("The Good King Dagobert") may refer to:

- "Le Bon Roi Dagobert" (song)
- Le Bon Roi Dagobert (1963 film), directed by Pierre Chevalier, starring Fernandel and Gino Cervi
- Le Bon Roi Dagobert (1984 film), directed by Dino Risi, starring Coluche and Michel Serrault

== See also ==
- Dagobert I (603-639), subject of the song
