= Des Visages des Figures =

Studio album by Noir Désir
- Released: 11 September 2001
- Genre: Rock
- Length: 68:52
- Label: Barclay
- Producer: Nick Sansano, Noir Désir, Jean Lamoot, Akosh Szelevényi

Noir Désir chronology
666667 Club (1996)	Des Visages des Figures (2001)	Noir Désir en public (2005)

Des Visages des Figures (Faces of Figures) is an album by French rock band Noir Désir. It was released in France and other European countries on 11 September 2001. It turned out to be the band's last studio effort. Noir Désir was officially disbanded in November 2010.

The group received five Victoires de la Musique award nominations in 2001, winning both Best Rock Album of the Year for Des Visages des Figures and Music Video of the Year for "Le vent nous portera." During that event, Bertrand Cantat read out a speech on behalf of the band, addressed to Jean-Marie Messier, then CEO of Vivendi, the group that had recently acquired Noir Désir's record company, Universal, and (according to him) used the band's name and reputation to somehow cover up his disfigurement of French culture for the sake of profit, ending with the phrase "and if we are embarked on the same planet, we definitely are not from the same world", sparking numerous commentaries in the media.

In 2010 the French edition of Rolling Stone magazine named this album the 60th greatest French rock album (out of 100).

All music was composed by Noir Désir, where not otherwise specified. Lyrics are by Bertrand Cantat, where not otherwise specified. Manu Chao plays the guitar in "Le vent nous portera", among numerous musicians participating in the album.

== Track listing ==
All tracks by Noir Désir

1. "L'enfant roi" – 6:03
2. "Le grand incendie" – 4:36
3. "Le vent nous portera" – 4:48
4. "Des armes" – 2:48 - Lyrics: poem by Léo Ferré
5. "L'appartement" – 4:11
6. "Des visages des figures" – 5:14
7. "Son style 1" – 2:06
8. "Son style 2" – 2:31
9. "À l'envers à l'endroit" – 4:07
10. "Lost" – 3:23
11. "Bouquet de nerfs" – 5:13
12. "L'Europe" – 23:44 - Lyrics by Cantat, Brigitte Fontaine - Music by Noir Désir and Akosh Szelevényi

Produced by Nick Sansano, Noir Désir, Jean Lamoot, and Akosh Szelevényi.

== Personnel ==
=== Noir Désir ===
- Bertrand Cantat – vocals, synthesizer, acoustic guitar, guitar, harmonica, percussion, piano, trumpet, voices, didjeridoo
- Serge Teyssot-Gay – electric guitar, acoustic guitar, synthesizer, sampling, backing vocals
- Jean-Paul Roy – bass, synthesizer, synthesizer bass, backing vocals
- Denis Barthe – drums, percussion, tambourine, xylophone, sampling, vibraphone, electronic percussion, crotale, backing vocals

=== Additional Personnel ===
- Jerome Albertini – photography
- Greg Calbi – mastering
- Manu Chao – guitar
- Bob "Stiv" Coke – tambourine, voices, gardon
- Romain Humeau – arranger
- Jean Lamoot – production
- Michelle Lewis – backing vocals
- Nick Sansano – keyboards, realization
- Lajos Somlosi – photography
- Akosh Szelevenyi – bass, clarinet, sax (soprano), sax (tenor), kalimba, kaval, realization, sifflet

== Certifications ==
Region	Certification	Certified units/sales
Belgium (BEA)	Platinum	50,000^{*}
France (SNEP)	2× Platinum	900,000
Switzerland (IFPI Switzerland)	Platinum	40,000^{^}
^{*} Sales figures based on certification alone.^{^} Shipments figures based on certification alone.
