= King Dagobert =

King Dagobert may refer to:

- Dagobert I (603-639), king of Austrasia and the Franks
- Dagobert II (650-679), king of Austrasia
- Dagobert III (699-715), Merovingian king of the Franks
- "Le bon roi Dagobert" (song), 18th century French satirical song

== See also ==
- Dagobert (disambiguation)
