= Pagolo Arsago =

Italian goldsmith

- Died: 1563
- Occupation: Goldsmith
- Known for: Member of the Goldsmith's Guild

Pagolo Arsago (died 1563) was a member of the Goldsmith's Guild. He kept his shop in Rome by the beautiful sixteenth-century church of Saint Eligius, patron of goldsmiths. Benvenuto Cellini made some goldsmith designs under Pagolo Arsago.

== Bibliography ==
- Booknotes 'Benvenuto Cellini autobiography' published by Penguin Classics
