= A.S. Dragon =

French rock group

A.S. Dragon is a French rock group, consisting of the members Stéphane Salvi (guitar), Michaël Garçon (piano), David Forgione remplace Fred Jimenez (bass) and Hervé Bouétard (drums). Natacha Le Jeune (singer) quit the group in 2007.

== The emancipation of a backing band ==
Formed by the label Tricatel, A.S. Dragon was originally created by their founder Bertrand Burgalat as a group to accompany the writer/poet/singer Michel Houellebecq. They founded the group out of many former members of Montecarl, and the singer, Uminski, was a childhood friend of Romain Humeau, the singer of Eiffel, who had formerly been the "backing band" of Houellebecq.

After having been assured of the deal with Houellebecq, A.S. Dragon recorded with Burgalat, and released a live album : Bertrand Burgalat Meets A.S. Dragon. The musicians collaborated with many other singers who influenced them, such as Alain Chamfort and Jacno.

But the group became frustrated at not having a real existence, and therefore decided to recruit the singer Natacha Le Jeune. Free from its mentors, A. S. Dragon recorded two albums, still with Tricatel : Spanked in 2003, and Va chercher la police in 2005.

== Between sixties pop, garage-punk and variety ==
The founder members of A.S. Dragon were mostly influenced by pop from the 60s/70s, which can be found in their sugary compositions, classical arrangements, and psychedelia, typical of the genre. But the arrival of Natacha in the group expanded their musical horizons to sound more like a female Iggy Pop and included references to the Stooges, in their music (more aggressive sounding), in the lyrics, (the song "I wanna be your doll" recalls the famous "I Wanna Be Your Dog"), and overall in their noisy concerts, which literally showed their rock energy.

In May 2007, A.S. Dragon announced an album without the participation of Natacha; they chose to recruit their next singer for their opus from their blog on Myspace. The disc was produced by A.S. Dragon, formed from their concerts.

Former member of A.S. Dragon, Peter Von Poehl, who has since launched a solo career.

== Discography ==
Bertrand Burgalat Meets A.S Dragon (2001)

1. Follow Me
2. Alsthom
3. Ma Rencontre
4. Kim
5. Gris Métal
6. O.K. Scorpions
7. Aux Cyclades Électronique
8. Sugar
9. Jalousies Et Tomettes
10. A.S Dragon
11. The Tears Of A Clown

Spanked (2003)

1. Dog Love Dog
2. Dirty
3. Mais Pas Chez Moi
4. Your Fame
5. Sorcière
6. Are We Talking Enough?
7. Drowning
8. Spank On Me
9. Une Hémisphère Dans Une Chevelure
10. Dedicated To The Press
11. Nighttime
12. One Two Three Four Boys

Va chercher la police (2006)

1. Morte
2. Cher Tueur
3. Comme Je Suis
4. L'Alchimiste
5. Seules A Paris
6. Corine
7. I Wanna Be Your Doll
8. Plastic Hooker
9. Froide
10. Naufrages De L'Ombre
11. Cloue-Moi Au Ciel
12. Tell Me
