= Theo Hakola =

American novelist

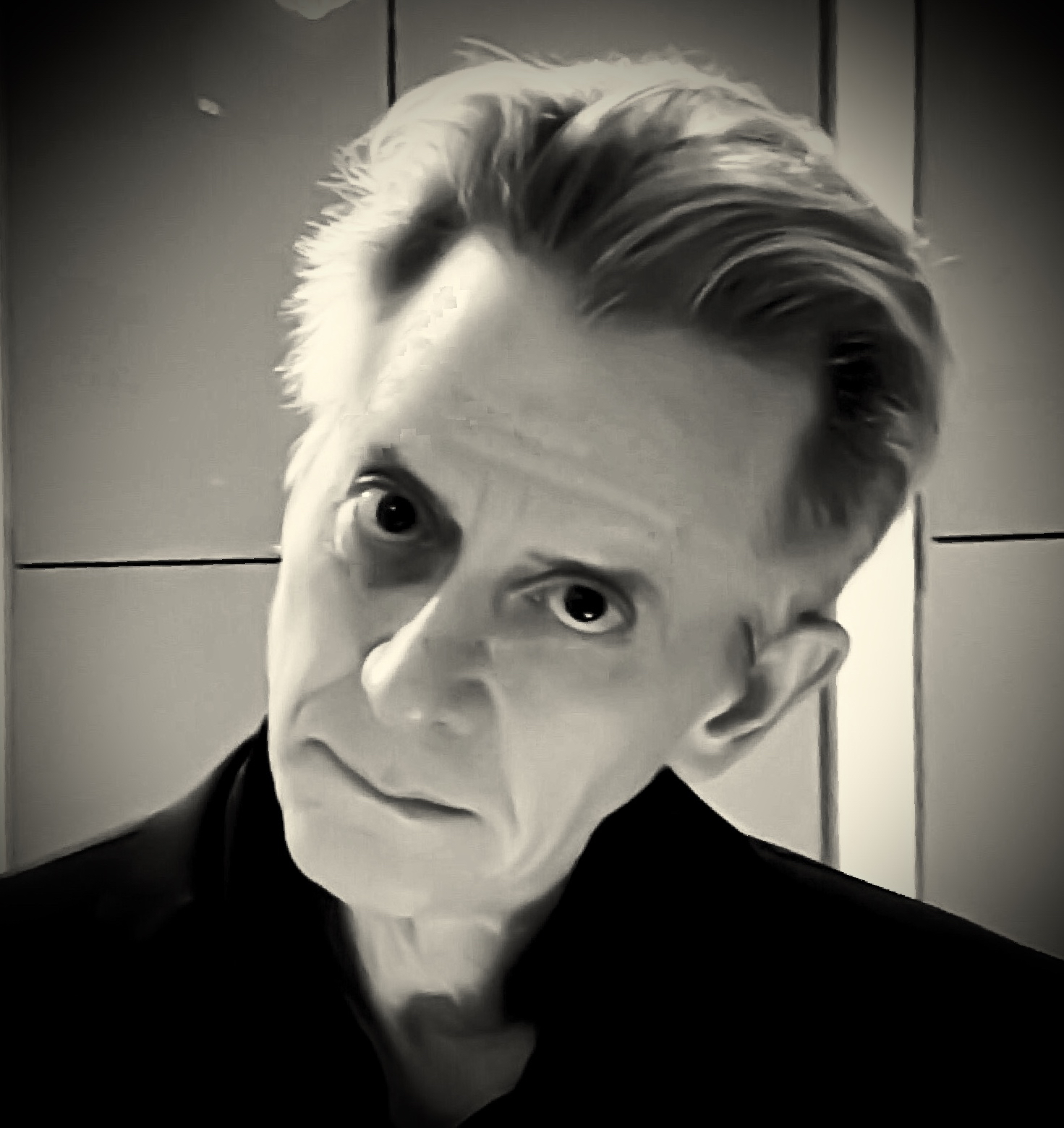
- Born: 1954 (age 71–72)
- Education: London School of Economics; Antioch College
- Occupations: Singer; Songwriter; Musician; Novelist
- Website: www.theohakola.com

Theo Hakola (born 1954) is an American singer, songwriter, musician, novelist and actor.

== Personal life and education ==
Hakola was raised in Spokane, Washington, USA. He is of Finnish and Swedish descent.

In 1975 Hakola studied at London School of Economics and Political Science and earned a BA in political history from Antioch College, Yellow Springs, Ohio in 1977. The following year he settled in Paris.

== Books ==
- The Way of Blood (La Route du Sang) (2001) Pub. Le Serpent à Plumes and in Finnish by WSOY (2002) ISBN 9782842612733
- Blood Streams (La Valse des Affluents) (2003) Pub. Le Serpent à Plumes and in Finnish by WSOY (2005) ISBN 9782842614133
- The Blood of Souls (Le Sang des âmes) (2008) Pub. Éditions Intervalles ISBN 9782916355252
- Rakia (2011) Pub. Éditions Intervalles ISBN 9782916355580
- The Snake Pit (Idaho Babylone) (2016) Pub. Actes Sud ISBN 9782330066420
- Over The Volcano (Sur le volcan) (2022) Pub. Actes Sud ISBN 9782330163662
- Non romanesque (2022) Pub. Les Fondeurs de Briques ISBN 9782916749624

== Music ==
=== Solo recordings ===
- Hunger of a Thin Man (Bondage-France, 1994)
- The Confession (Absinthe/Bondage-France, 1995)
- Overflow (Grosse Rose/Musidisc, 1997)
- La Chanson du Zorro Andalou (Grosse Rose/Kerig, 2000)
- Drunk Women and Sexual Water (Wobbly Ashes Records/Anticraft, 2007)
- This Land is Not Your Land (Wobbly Ashes Records/Disques du 7e ciel, 2012)
- I Fry Mine in Butter (Wobbly Ashes Records/Médiapop Records, 2016)
- Water Is Wet (Wobbly Ashes Records/Microcultures/Médiapop Records, 2020)
- Shalalalala (Wobbly Ashes Records/Microcultures/Médiapop Records, 2024)

=== With Passion Fodder ===
- Hard Words from a Soft Mouth (Barclay/PolyGram-France/Beggars Banquet-World, 1985)
- Fat Tuesday (Barclay/PolyGram-France/Beggars Banquet-World, 1986)
- Love, Waltzes and Anarchy (Barclay/PolyGram-France/Beggars Banquet-World, 1987)
- Woke Up This Morning (Barclay/PolyGram-France/Beggars Banquet-World, 1989)
- What Fresh Hell is This? (Barclay/PolyGram-France/Beggars Banquet-World, 1991)
- Songs Sacred and Profane 1985-1991 (Barclay/PolyGram-France/Beggars Banquet-World, 1993)
- And Bleed That River Dry 1985-1991 (Barclay/PolyGram-France/Beggars Banquet-World, 1998)

=== With Orchestre Rouge ===
- Yellow Laughter (RCA-France, 1982)
- More Passion Fodder (RCA-France, 1983)

=== Production ===
- Noir Désir - Où veux tu qu'je r'garde (Barclay/PolyGram-France) (1987)
- E.V. - Reuz (Lola Label/PolyGramFrance) (1994)
- Les Hurleurs - Bazar (Barclay/Universal) (1996)
- Les Malpolis - La Fin du retour de la chanson (Willing/Mosaic Music) (2005)
- Gecko Palace – Tout va si bien (New Track Music) (2008)

=== Film music ===
- Babel metropolite dir. Beajena Borakova (1988)
- Peaux de vaches dir. Patricia Mazuy (1989)
- Perpetua dir. Claudia Neubern (1999)
- La Fille préférée dir. Lou Jeunet (1999)
- Les Petites Mains dir. Lou Jeunet (2001)
- The Wind dir. Victor Söjström (ciné-concert) (2007)
- La Vallée de larmes dir. Agathe Dronne (2011)
- Au bonheur des dames dir. Julien Duvivier (ciné-concert) (2013)

== Actor ==
=== Theatre ===
- Mahagonny (Bertolt Brecht/Kurt Weill) – actor (Alaskawolf Joe), Paris and on tour in France... – 1983 Directed by Hans-Peter Cloos.
- La Chanson du Zorro andalou (Theo Hakola) – author/actor/composer/director, 1999–2000, Rennes, Lille, Paris...
- Ellen Foster (Kaye Gibbons) – composer/musician and translator in Dijon (Festival Frictions) and Lille (l’Aéronef) – 2002 then, as co-director, Bagnolet (l’Échangeur) and Lyon (Théâtre de la Renaissance) – 2005.
- Une Dizaine de Morts (based on the works of Michael Ondaatje), adapter-author/composer/musician... Lyon, Manosque – 2003, Paris, Lille – 2004
- Les Chansons de ‘La Valse des affluents’ (Theo Hakola) scored reading based on the novel, author/composer/musician... Manosque, Poitiers – 2004, and Lyon – 2005.
- La Thébaïde (Jean Racine) – composer/musician, Centre dramatique national de Montreuil and the Atelier du Rhin in Colmar – October/Novembre 2007. Directed by Sandrine Lanno.
- Le Chant des âmes scored reading based on Le Sang des âmes, author/composer/musician... Finnish Cultural Center, Paris – 2009.
- Chroniques du bord de scène - Hello America 2009/10, followed by USA, d'après Dos Passos – composer/musician/actor – at the MC93-Bobigny – 2009/10. Directed by Nicolas Bigards.
- L'Invention du monde (Olivier Rolin) – composer/musician – at the MC93 Bobigny – 2010. Directed by Michel Deutsch.
- La Ballade de Carson Clay (Theo Hakola) scored reading based on La Valse des affluents, author/composer/musician... Grenoble, Bobigny – 2011-2015
- Sur la route scored reading based on Jack Kerouac's On The Road, composer/musician... Manosque, Toulouse, Grenoble, Caen, Vendôme, Vincennes, Rennes – 2012–2015...
- Rakia (Theo Hakola) scored reading based on the novel, with Dominique Reymond; author/composer/musician... Dijon – 2013
- American Tabloid (James Ellroy) composer/musician – MC93-Bobigny – 2013. Directed by Nicolas Bigards.
- Idaho Babylone (Theo Hakola) scored reading based on the novel, with Dominique Reymond, Bénédicte Villain and Simon Texier; author/composer/musician... Grenoble, Frontignan – 2017

=== Film and TV ===
- La Fille Prèfèrèe (1999) Dir. Lou Jeunet
- Ma Mère (2004) Dir. Christophe Honoré
- Une Famille Parfaite (2006) Dir. Pierre Trividic
- The Portuguese Man 'O War (2008) Dir. Lauren Makael
- Suerte (2010) Dir. Jacques Séchaud
- Pictures (2011) Dir. Florent Quint
- Curiosa (2019) Dir. Lou Jeunet
- Vampires (2019) Netflix
- Alien Crystal Palace (2019) Dir. Arielle Dombasle
- La Bête (2023) Dir. Bertrand Bonello
- Truth or Consequences (2023) Dir. Philippe Prouff

== Radio and journalism ==
- D.J./producer on France Inter, Radio Monte Carlo (RMC Côte d'Azur), France Culture, Radio Nova and Radio Cité 96.
- Publication of articles on European culture and politics in In These Times and in Cinéaste (USA) and in La Règle du jeu, Libération, Actuel, Globe, Les Inrockuptibles.
