= AS Dragon =

AS Dragon may refer to:

- AS Dragon (Guadeloupe), a football team in Guadeloupe, relegated from Guadeloupe Division of Honour in 2011
- AS Dragon (Tahiti), a football team in Tahiti
- AS Dragons (Kinshasa), a football in the Democratic Republic of the Congo
- AS Dragons FC de l'Ouémé, a football team in Benin
- A.S. Dragon, a French rock group
