= Romain Humeau =

French musician (born 1971)

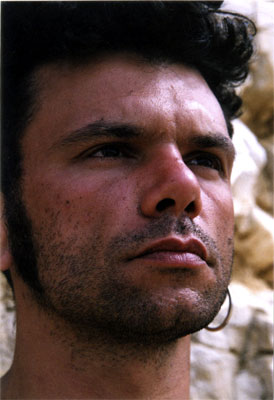
- Romain Humeau (2004)

Background information
- Born: 10 April 1971 (age 55); Aix-en-Provence, France
- Genres: Rock
- Instruments: vocals, guitar, banjo, bass, piano, violin
- Years active: since 1996
- Labels: PIAS Group Virgin Music; EMI
- Website: http://www.romain-humeau.com

Romain Humeau (born 10 April 1971) is a French musician best known for being the lead singer of the French band Eiffel.

== Biography ==
Romain was born on 10 April 1971 in Aix-en-Provence, France. He spent his early childhood in Nérac before leaving in 1978. His father was a harpsichord maker and his mother was a flutist. He started learning the violin at the age of 5.

He studied music at the Conservatoire de Toulouse from 1989 to 1994. He is married to Eiffel band mate Estelle Humeau.

== Career ==
=== Eiffel ===
Humeau was a member of the band Oobik and the Pucks, that formed in 1995. It was after serious differences with their record label that the band reformed to become Eiffel in 1998. Eiffel saw success in France with their 2006 album Tandoori which peaked at 36 in the France Albums Top 150, spending 5 weeks on the charts. In 2009 Eiffel released À tout moment. They recorded the song Le Temps des cerises in collaboration with Serge Teyssot-Gay and Bertrand Cantat, from the group Noir Désir to promote the album's release. The album peaked at 16 on the France Albums Top 150. The group launched itself on a tour, starting 29 October 2009 in Saint-Étienne. Their most successful album Foule Monstre (2012) peaked at number 9 on the France Albums Top 150 and reached 78 on Swiss Albums Top 100. The Foule Monstre tour saw the band tour in France, Belgium and Switzerland.

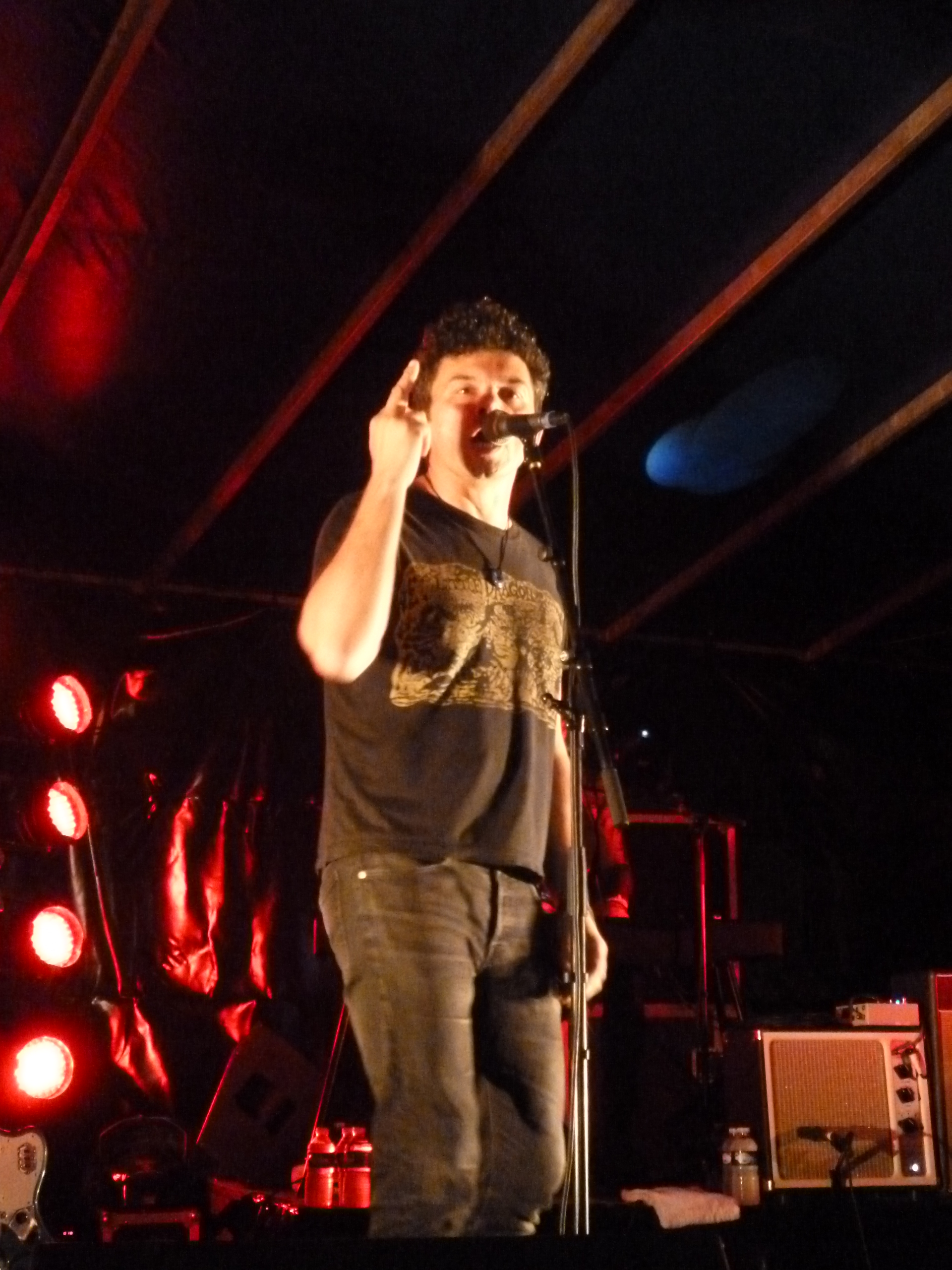
Romain Humeau in concert in Maignelay-Montigny June 2017.

=== Solo career ===
Humeau released his debut solo album in 2005. Titled L'eternité De L'instant, it peaked at 96 in the France Top 150 Albums Following the album's release he toured France. He took a 10-year break from his solo career following L'eternité De L'instant. He returned with Vendredi ou les limbes du Pacifique in 2015. It was a commercial flop, failing to feature on the charts. The only album of his solo career to not feature on the France Top 150 Albums Chart. He followed up with Mousquetaire #1, a far more successful album reaching 67 on the France Top 150 Albums Chart. This to date is his most successful solo album. He released his fourth solo album Mousquetaire #2 in 2018, which performed worse than his previous album, charting at 145 in the France Top 150 Albums Chart. He toured France and Belgium shortly after the release of Mousquetaire #2. In September 2020, Humeau released his fifth solo, studio album Echos.

== Discography ==
=== Albums ===
Studio

- 2001: Abricotine (EMI 850696)
- 2002: Le Quart d'heure des ahuris (EMI/Virgin 8132452)
- 2007: Tandoori (EMI 384801)
- 2009: À tout moment (PIAS RECORDINGS 894769)
- 2012: Foule monstre
- 2019: Stupor machine

Live

- 2004: Les Yeux fermés (double album) (Labels 576607)

=== EPs ===
- 1999: L'Affaire (EP)
- 2000: Abricotine & Quality Street (EP)
- 2006: Ma Part D'Ombre (EP)

=== DVDs ===
- 2004: Live aux Eurockéennes de Belfort 2003

=== Solo work ===
Studio albums

- 2005: L'Éternité De L'Instant
- 2015: Vendredi Ou Les Limbes Du Pacifique
- 2016: Mousquetaire #1
- 2018: Mousquetaire#2
- 2020: Echos
