= Good King Dagobert =

1984 film by Dino Risi

- Film poster
- Directed by: Dino Risi
- Written by: Dino Risi; Age & Scarpelli; Gérard Brach
- Story by: Age & Scarpelli
- Produced by: Renzo Rossellini; Jacques-Paul Bertrand
- Starring: Coluche; Michel Serrault; Ugo Tognazzi; Carole Bouquet; Isabella Ferrari; Michael Lonsdale
- Cinematography: Dante Ferretti
- Edited by: Alberto Gallitti
- Music by: Guido De Angelis & Maurizio De Angelis
- Distributed by: Gaumont Distribution
- Release date: 1984
- Running time: 112 minutes
- Countries: Italy; France
- Languages: Italian; French

Good King Dagobert (French title: Le Bon Roi Dagobert; in Italian: Dagobert) is a 1984 French-Italian historical comedy film directed by Dino Risi and starring the French comedian Coluche. Its title comes from French "Le bon roi Dagobert" nursery rhyme, and though the cast contains historical characters the plot is fiction.

== Plot ==
Dagobert, the dim, dirty, idle, cowardly and lecherous king of the Franks, is under pressure from his ministers and the Roman Catholic church to make his peace with Pope Honorius I. He undertakes a pilgrimage to Rome, seeking both an alliance and absolution for his countless sins. Repeatedly outwitted there by far wilier men and women, he returns home with a poisoned brooch for his queen, his plan being to remove her and marry an alleged daughter of the Byzantine emperor Heraclius. Pinning the brooch on her, he pricks his finger and dies from the poison. His ministers arrange for his corpse to be hauled into the sky at night from a high tower and then proclaim that he had ascended into heaven.

== Cast ==
- Coluche - Dagobert I
- Michel Serrault - Otarius
- Ugo Tognazzi - Pope Honorius and his look-alike
- Carole Bouquet - Héméré
- Isabella Ferrari - Chrodilde
- Michael Lonsdale - Saint Eligius
- Venantino Venantini - Demetrius, merchant
- Karin Mai - Nanthild, the Queen
- Francesco Scali - Landek
- Antonio Vezza - Rutilius
- Sabrina Siani - Berthilde
- Marcello Bonini Olas - Heraclius, the Emperor of Byzance
- Isabella Dandolo - Alpaide
- Federica Paccosi - Ragnetrude
- Gea Martire - Philliria
