= Dies Irae (Noir Désir album) =

Live album by Noir Désir
- Released: 27 January 1994
- Genre: Rock
- Label: Barclays

Noir Désir chronology
Tostaky (1992)	Dies Irae (1994)	666667 Club (1996)

Professional ratings
Review scores
Source	Rating
Allmusic	3/5 stars

Dies Irae (Day of Wrath) is a live album by French rock band Noir Désir, recorded during the tour in support of the album Tostaky and released in 1994. Aside from the band's own originals, the album features two covers:

- "I Want You (She's So Heavy)" (The Beatles)
- "Long Time Man" (Tim Rose)

The name of the album was selected by the band's guitarist Serge Teyssot-Gay who, while using a dictionary, found Dies Irae, and because of its similarity to a Noir Désir anagram and the translation, Day of Wrath, he felt the expression suited the band well.

An alternate version of I Want You (She's So Heavy) is featured as a hidden track.

== Track listing ==
=== Disc 1 ===
No.	Title	Length
1.	"La Rage"	3:13
2.	"Here It Comes Slowly"	2:42
3.	"Ici Paris"	3:50
4.	"One Trip/One Noise"	4:41
5.	"Alice"	3:45
6.	"Les Écorchés"	3:38
7.	"Le Fleuve"	5:09
8.	"Oublié"	6:23
9.	"Tostaky (Le Continent)"	4:49
10.	"Sober Song"	3:43
11.	"It Spurts"	4:00

=== Disc 2 ===
No.	Title	Length
1.	"Johnny colère"	2:15
2.	"The Holy Economic War"	5:05
3.	"La Chaleur"	3:38
4.	"À l'arrière des taxis"	4:10
5.	"Marlène"	3:25
6.	"Long Time Man"	5:37
7.	"No No No"	3:21
8.	"What I Need"	4:45
9.	"Lolita nie en bloc"	3:31
10.	"I Want You (She's So Heavy)"	4:57
11.	"En route pour la joie"	20:51

== Charts ==
Chart (1994)	Peak position
Belgium	14
France	1
