= Jean-Baptiste Clément =

French chansonnier, poet and communard

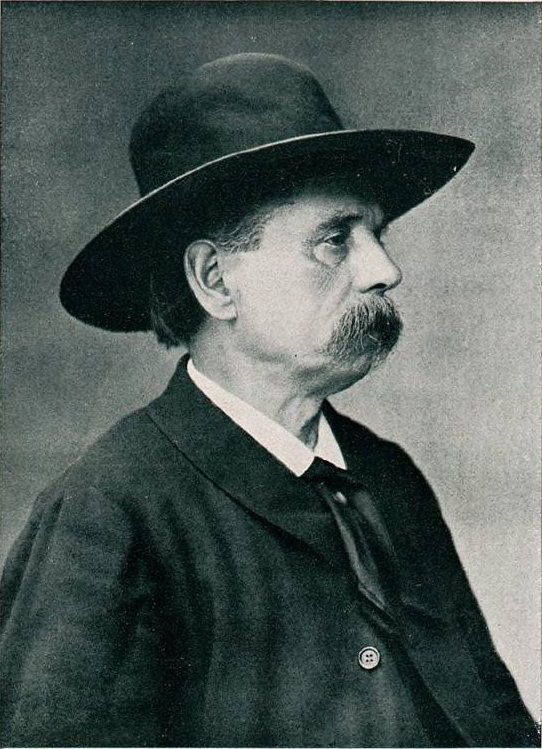
Portrait of Jean-Baptiste Clément by Félix Nadar. 1900

Jean-Baptiste Clément (French: [ʒɑ̃ batist klemɑ̃]; 31 May 1836 in Seine – 23 February 1903 in Paris) was a French chansonnier, journalist, socialist activist and communard. He is mostly known for his work Le Temps des cerises, which is strongly associated with the Paris Commune.

== Biography ==
Clément was born in to the family of a wealthy miller. He left his family as a teenager and became a metal worker. He soon began to become active in socialist circles as a journalist and became associated with prominent activists such as Jules Vallès. In 1867, he had to flee to Belgium, where he published Le Temps des cerises later on.

He returned to Paris and continued his activism against the Second French Empire which eventually got him arrested and imprisoned in the Sainte-Pélagie Prison. Clément was released after the Republican protests and abdication of Napoleon III. He became a member of the National Guard and participated in protests against the Government of National Defence.

After the proclamation of the Paris Commune, he was elected to the Commune Council and fought in the defense barricades during the semaine sanglante.

After the fall of the Commune, he managed to flee Paris and through Belgium he settled in Britain for a short time. He was sentenced to death in absentia and during this period lived clandestinely with his family in Montfermeil. He returned to Paris of the general amnesty of 1880.

Clément participated in the founding of the Revolutionary Socialist Workers' Party of Jean Allemane. He also a member of the Grand Orient de France.

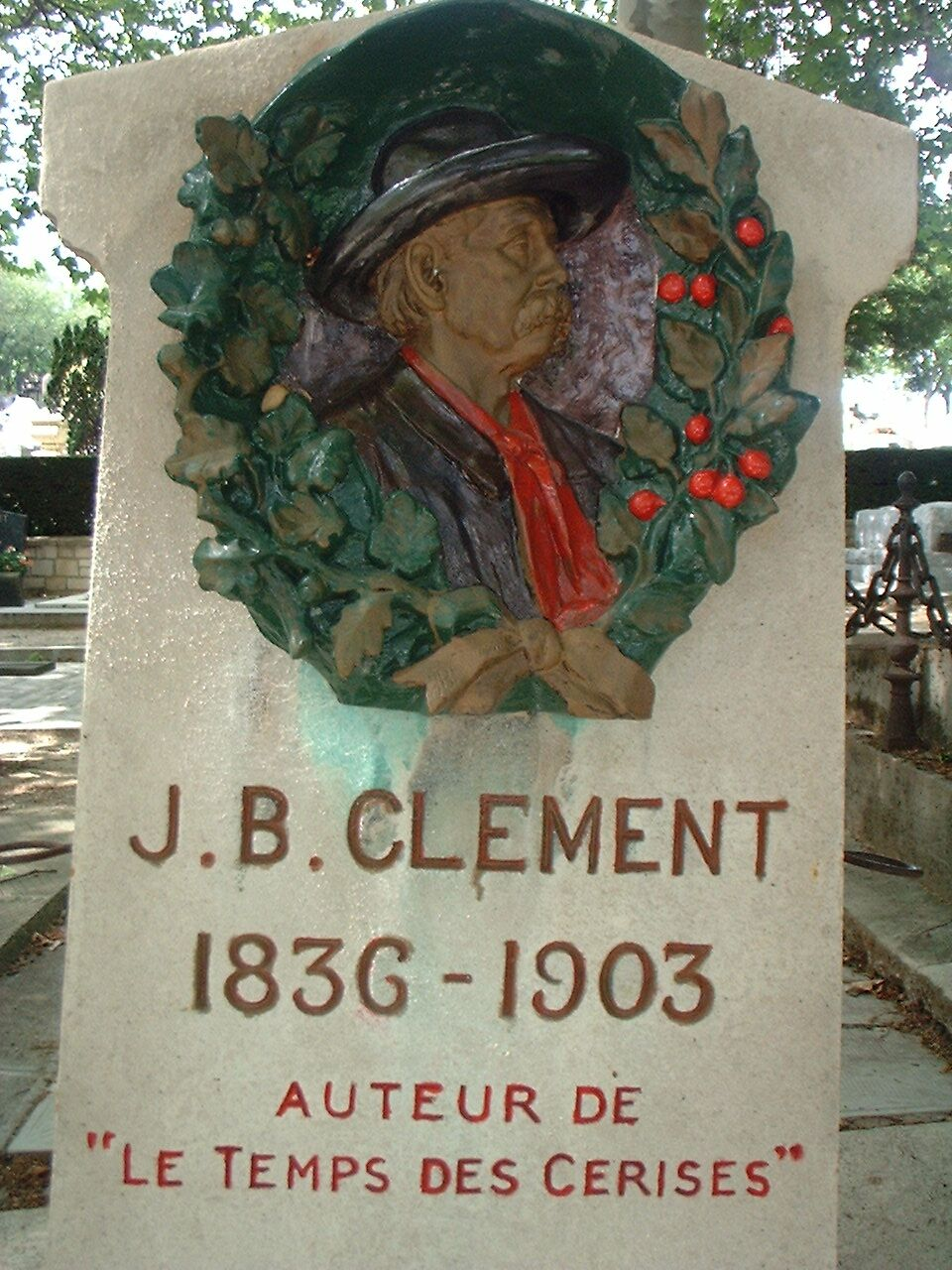
Tomb of Jean-Baptiste Clément at the Père Lachaise Cemetery

Jean-Baptiste Clément died on 23 February, 1903 in Paris aged 66.

== Selected songs ==
- Au moulin de Bagnolet (1863)
- Le Moulin des larmes (1865)
- Le Temps des cerises (1866)
- La Semaine sanglante (1871)
- La Chanson du semeur (1882)
- Les Traîne-misère (1883)
- Aux loups (1884)
- La Grève (1893)
- En avant paysans ! (1900)
- Dansons la capucine (1860-1870 ?)
- Le Capitaine « Au mur »
- La Marjolaine
- Bonjour printemps
- Quatre-vingt-neuf
- L'Eau va toujours à la rivière
- Fournaise
- Ah le joli temps !
- Le Chasse neige
- Le Bonheur des champs
- Le Couteau de Jeannette
- Fille des champs
- Le Barde Gaulois
- J'n'en ai pas le courage
- Le Chant du ruisseau
- Je vais chez la meunière
