= 666.667 Club =

Studio album by Noir Désir
- Released: 17 December 1996
- Genre: French rock
- Length: 50:39
- Label: Barclay
- Producer: Ted Niceley, Noir Désir

Noir Désir chronology
Dies Irae (1994)	666.667 Club (1996)	Des Visages des Figures (2001)

666.667 Club is an album by French rock band Noir Désir. It was released in France and other European countries on 17 December 1996. The album was certified double platinum in France on 17 September 1997, which at the time signified sales of above 600,000. The French edition of Rolling Stone magazine named this album the 12th greatest French rock album (out of 100).

== Track listing ==
- All songs written by Bertrand Cantat and Noir Désir, except where noted.
1. "666.667 Club" – 3:40
2. "Fin de siècle" – 5:34
3. "Un jour en France" – 3:12
4. "À ton étoile" – 4:27
5. "Ernestine" – 4:41
6. "Comme elle vient" – 2:25
7. "Prayer for a Wanker" – 3:09
8. "Les persiennes" – 4:08
9. "L'homme pressé" – 3:45
10. "Lazy" – 5:33
11. "A la longue" – 4:27
12. "Septembre, en attendant" – 3:01 (Lyrics: Bertrand Cantat; Music: Frédéric Vidalenc)
13. "Song for JLP" – 3:28 (not listed in album cover; bonus track)
- Note: While most of the album is based on electric guitar and can be classified easily as rock, the last track, Song for JLP, features Cantat with an acoustic guitar, without the accompaniment of other instruments, singing in a mix of rock and blues styles.

== Personnel ==
=== Noir Désir ===
- Bertrand Cantat: Vocals, Guitars, Harmonica, Percussion
- Serge Teyssot-Gay: Guitars, Organ
- Jean-Paul Roy: Bass (tracks 1–11 and 13)
- Denis Barthe: Drums, Percussion, Backing Vocals

=== Additional Personnel ===
- Alain Perrier, Les Elèves De L'Ecole Nationale De Musique Et De Danse Des Landes, Patrice Labèque, Thierry Duvigneau: Backing Vocals
- Frédéric Vidalenc: Bass on track 12
- Akosh Szelevényi: Saxophone, Kalimba, Oboe, Bass clarinet, Tibetan Bells
- Lajkó Félix: Violin
- Produced by Ted Niceley and Noir Désir.

== Certifications ==
Region	Certification	Certified units/sales
France (SNEP)	2× Platinum	600,000^{*}
Switzerland (IFPI Switzerland)	Gold	25,000^{^}
^{*} Sales figures based on certification alone.^{^} Shipments figures based on certification alone.
