= Où veux tu qu'je r'garde =

Où veux-tu qu'je r'garde

Studio album by Noir Désir
- Released: 1987
- Recorded: 1987
- Studio: ICP Recording Studios, Brussels, Belgium
- Genre: Alternative rock
- Length: 27:06
- Label: Barclay
- Producer: Theo Hakola, Erwin Autrique (assistant producer)

Noir Désir chronology
Où veux-tu qu'je r'garde (1987)	Veuillez rendre l'âme (à qui elle appartient) (1989)

Où veux-tu qu'je r'garde is the first album from French alternative rock group Noir Désir. Released in 1987, it was produced by Theo Hakola, at the time the singer for the group Passion Fodder.

== Track listing ==
All music composed by Noir Désir; all lyrics composed by Bertrand Cantat

1. "Où veux-tu qu'je r'garde" - 4:43
2. "Toujours être ailleurs" - 4:32
3. "La Rage" - 3:13
4. "Pyromane" - 4:22
5. "Danse sur le feu Maria" - 3:56
6. "Lola" - 5:10

== Personnel ==
- Bertrand Cantat: Vocals, rhythm guitar
- Serge Teyssot-Gay: Lead guitar, backing vocals
- Frédéric Vidalenc: Bass, backing vocals
- Denis Barthe: Drums, percussion, backing vocals
