= Tostaky =

Studio album by Noir Désir
- Released: 8 December 1992
- Genre: Rock
- Length: 46:23
- Label: Barclays
- Producer: Ted Niceley

Noir Désir chronology
Du ciment sous les plaines (1991)	Tostaky (1992)	Dies Irae (1994)

Professional ratings
Review scores
Source	Rating
Allmusic	3/5 stars

Tostaky is an album by French rock band Noir Désir. It was released in France in 1992 on the Barclay label.

The word "tostaky" is a slang contraction of the Spanish expression "todo está aquí" (everything is here), one of the slogans used by Mexican revolutionaries led by Emiliano Zapata.

The French edition of Rolling Stone magazine named this album the 2nd greatest French rock album (out of 100).

== Track listing ==
1. "Here It Comes Slowly" - 3:03
2. "Ici Paris" - 3:37
3. "Oublié" - 4:33
4. "Alice" - 3:55
5. "One Trip / One Noise" - 4:12
6. "Tostaky (Le continent)" - 5:29
7. "Marlène" - 3:03
8. "Johnny colère" - 2:17
9. "7 minutes" - 6:00
10. "Sober Song" - 2:51
11. "It Spurts" - 3:53
12. "Lolita nie en bloc" - 3:30
