= Du ciment sous les plaines =

Studio album by Noir Désir
- Released: 1991
- Recorded: 1990
- Genre: Alternative rock
- Label: Barclays
- Producer: Noir Désir, Phil Delire, Olivier Genty

Noir Désir chronology
Veuillez rendre l'âme (à qui elle appartient) (1989)	Du ciment sous les plaines (1991)	Tostaky (1992)

Professional ratings
Review scores
Source	Rating
AllMusic	3/5 stars

Du ciment sous les plaines is the third album by the French rock group Noir Désir.

In 2010, the French edition of Rolling Stone magazine named this album the 21st greatest French rock album (out of 100).

== Track listing ==
1. "No no no" - 3:27
2. "En route pour la joie" - 3:05
3. "Charlie" - 3:57
4. "Tu m'donnes le mal" - 3:57
5. "Si rien ne bouge" - 5:15
6. "The Holy Economic War" - 3:03
7. "Tout l'or" - 4:13
8. "La Chanson de la main" - 3:42
9. "Pictures of Yourself" -3:13
10. "Les Oriflammes" - 3:27
11. "Elle va où elle veut" - 3:30
12. "Le Zen Émoi" - 3:25
13. "The Chameleon" - 5:13
14. "Hoo Doo" - 0:43
