= Le vent nous portera =

Single by Noir Désir

from the album des Visages des Figures
- Released: 28 August 2001
- Genre: Alternative rock
- Length: 4:48
- Label: Zeitgeist Records/Polydor Records

Noir Désir singles chronology
"Fin de siècle (G.L.Y.O.)" (1998)	"Le vent nous portera" (2001)	"Lost" (2002)

"Le vent nous portera" (lit. 'The Wind Will Carry Us') is a song by French rock band Noir Désir from their 2001 album des Visages des Figures. It was released as the first single from the album and reached number one for four weeks in a row in the Italian Singles Charts, as well as number three in the French charts and number seven in the Belgian Record Charts. French-born Spanish artist Manu Chao collaborated on the song and played guitar.

== Music video ==
The music video was directed by Alexandre Courtes and Jacques Veneruso and featured Rebecca Hampton as the main character. It won Music Video of the Year in 2001.

The music video starts with Rebecca Hampton and a child going to a beach, and they find somewhere to sit. Rebecca calls the child to show him a shovel; the child hugs her and then he goes away. Rebecca gets a book out of a bag and reads it. Meanwhile, the kid continues to make a sandcastle, but he notices the wind getting louder. After maybe many hours, the mom can't see the child, so she panics and tries and find him. She finds him and smiles; however, for the kid, he sees her as normal then as a disturbing figure. She leaves while he watches, then he continues to make this huge castle. The mom falls asleep, then out of nowhere, a huge storm comes. The boy runs away to try to find his mom. The mom wakes up and tries to call the child to come back, but because of the wind, she gets pulled away. The sandcastle is also destroyed. Later the boy looks at the sea and thinks about what happened, then the video ends.

== Covers ==
The song has been covered by Belgian girls' choir Scala & Kolacny Brothers on their album Respire (2004), by Swiss singer Sophie Hunger on her album 1983 (2010), by German band Element of Crime on their album Fremde Federn (2010), by Les Charbonniers de l'enfer on their album Nouvelles fréquentations (2010), and Hungarian band Kistehén on the soundtrack for the film Kalandorok (2008). The Swedish-Hungarian singer Antonia Vai also performed a cover of this song live in 2016 on one of her concerts.

== Trivia ==
It is the title song of the movie Q.

== Chart performance ==
=== Weekly charts ===
Chart performance for "Le vent nous portera"
Chart (2001)	Peak position
Belgium (Ultratop 50 Wallonia)	7
France (SNEP)	3
Italy (FIMI)	1
Netherlands (Single Top 100)	39

=== Year-end charts ===
Year-end chart performance for "Le vent nous portera"
Chart (2001)	Position
Belgium (Ultratop Wallonia)	43
France (SNEP)	33
