= Jean-Paul Roy =

French bassist (born 1964)

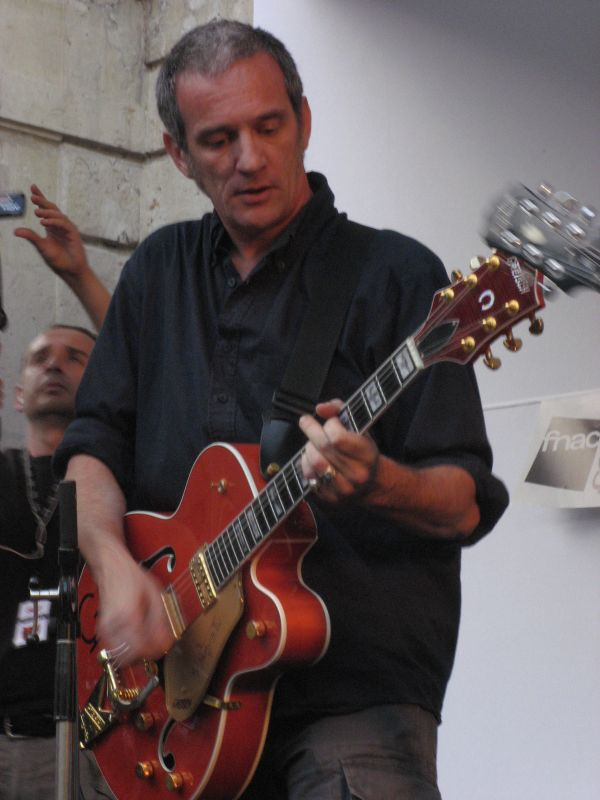
Jean-Paul Roy playing guitar with Les Hyènes in 2007

Jean-Paul Roy (born 14 August 1964 in Civray, Vienne) has been the bassist of French rock group Noir Désir since 1996.

Before joining the band, he accompanied Noir Désir on tour as a guitar technician. When the bassist Frédéric Vidalenc left the group in 1996 to pursue other musical interests, Jean-Paul Roy was naturally chosen as his successor as he was a friend of the group, played both guitar and bass guitar, and knew how to play Noir Désir's songs.

He has played a few songs with Alain Bashung and participated as a bassist on one of the songs of the artist Romain Humeau (who had also written arrangements for the Noir Desir song "Des Visages, Des Figures").

In 2006, he participated in the creation of the soundtrack of the film Enfermés dehors (by Albert Dupontel), accompanied by Noir Desir's drummer, Denis Barthe, under the name Les Hyènes.

Jean-Paul Roy is one of the organisers of the music festival : Les Rendez-vous de Terres Neuves.
