= Le Bon Roi Dagobert (song) =

French satirical anti-monarchical and anti-clerical song

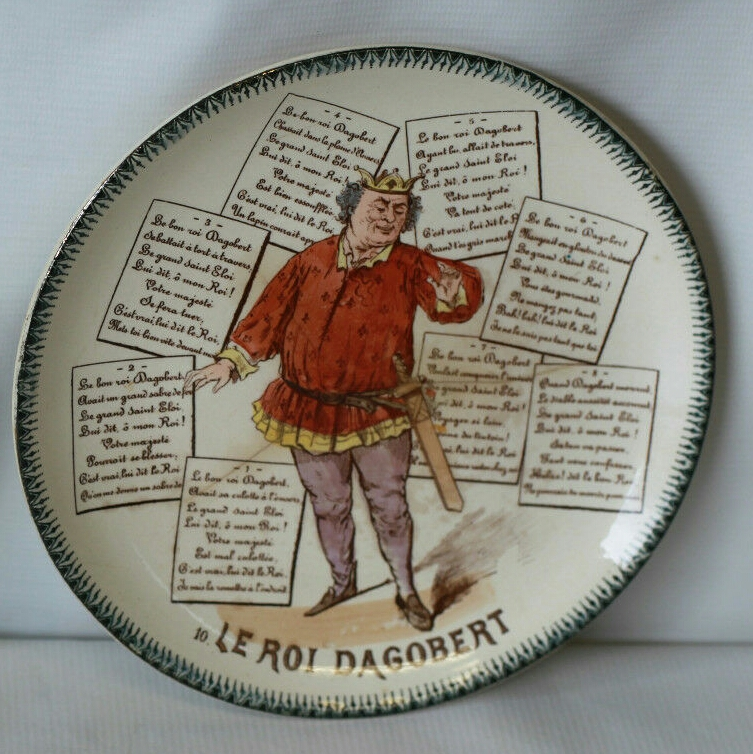
"Le roi Dagobert", a faience plate from Choisy-le-Roi (late 19th century)

"Le bon roi Dagobert" (French for "The good king Dagobert") is a French satirical anti-monarchical and anti-clerical song written around 1787. It references two historical figures: the Merovingian king Dagobert I (c. 600–639) and his chief advisor, Saint Eligius (Éloi) (c. 588–660), the bishop of Noyon. The song is directed against Louis XVI and the ties maintained by the Catholic Church with the ancien régime, but it was used more broadly against monarchies in French history.

In current times, it is a classic children's song.

== Creation ==
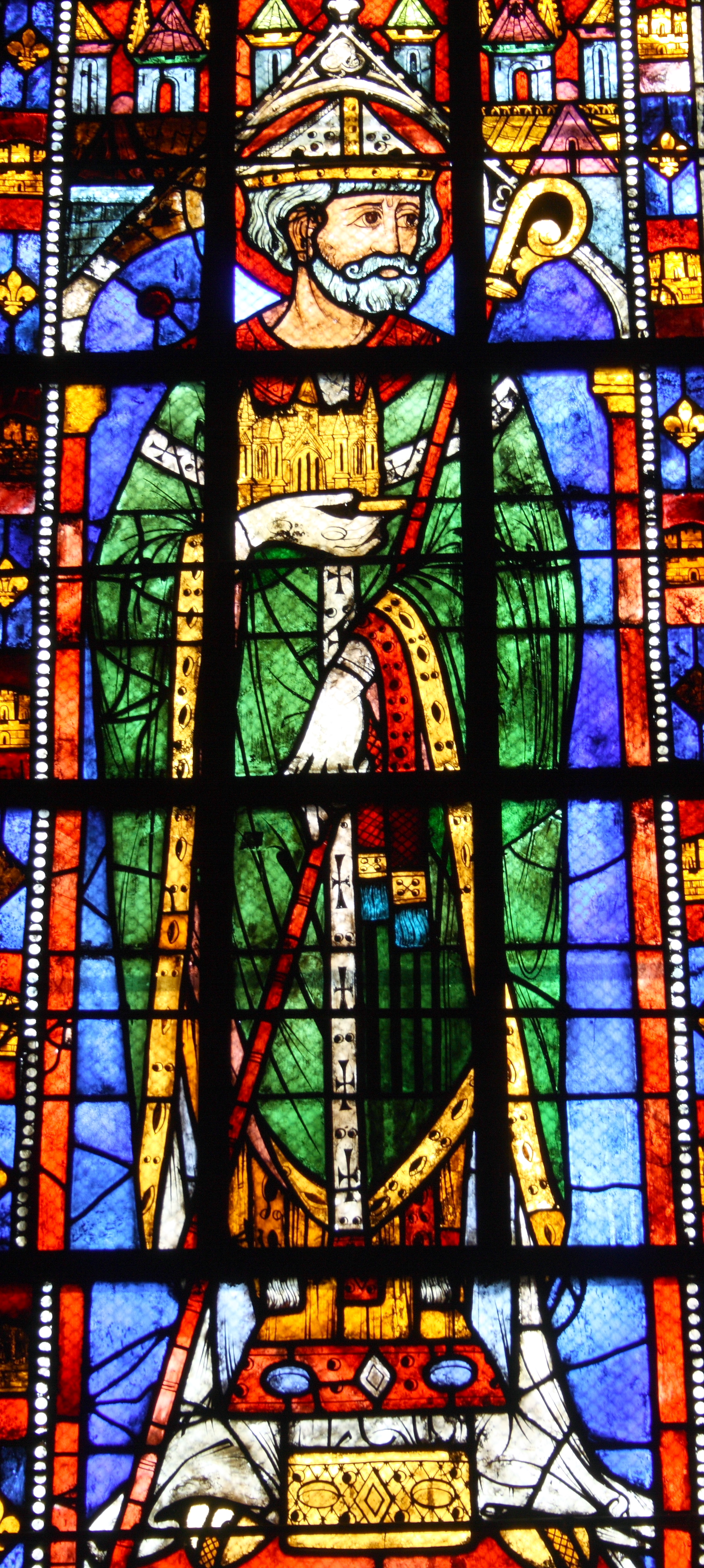
Stained glass window of Saint Eligius (Eloi) in the Church of Sainte-Anne de Gassicourt, in Mantes-la-Jolie

Written around 1787, the song is believed to be inspired by a much older hunting tune, "La Fanfare du grand cerf". The verses were written over time. The first lyrics date from the revolutionary period and were intended to ridicule the monarchy, particularly Louis XVI, who was seen as nonchalant and indecisive at the time. In one of the passages directly targeting Louis XVI, one can find the following line: "Le bon roi Dagobert, mangeait en glouton du dessert" (in English: The good King Dagobert used to eat dessert like a glutton), a text aimed at the gluttony that Louis XVI was supposed to exhibit.

Against historical reality, Dagobert is depicted as a lazy and incapable king, as this provided good artistic material for criticizing the monarchy while avoiding royal censorship. Dagobert was chosen as protagonist because he was the founding king of the Basilica of Saint-Denis. The basilica was one of the central symbols of the religious ideology that underpinned the divine right monarchy characteristic of the ancien régime.

The Catholic Church was also targeted through Saint Eligius, who in the song represents a bishop figure giving approval to the political power. According to Renee Lynn Goethe, "In the march of events toward the French Revolution, the song became both anti-monarchical and anti-ecclesiastical; both the first and second orders are condemned as corrupt, incompetent, and ruled by concerns not shared by the third order. Dagobert thus made his final transformation from client king of the royal patron saint to buffoon and, finally, to obscurity."

After Napoleon's defeat in Russia and exile to the island of Elba, the royalists revived the fifteenth stanza. Consequently, the song was banned during the Hundred Days. The lyrics were later applied to Louis XVIII during the Restoration and even to Napoleon III.

== Legacy ==
For its hourly chime, the clock of the town hall in the Parisian suburb of Saint-Denis alternates between two different tunes, "Le bon roi Dagobert" and "Le temps des cerises". In the early 2000s, a study was conducted in about ten French primary schools. Children aged 8 to 11 were asked to draw figures representing concepts, such as kindness. Dagobert was one of the most stereotyped figures drawn overall. He was specifically represented to characterize stupidity. Today, it is considered one of the basic children's songs in France alongside "Au clair de la lune".

The tune was mentioned by Émile Zola in Nana and Au Bonheur des Dames. The poet Charles Péguy added numerous verses to it, just like other poets who shaped the version they preferred. André Rivoire wrote a play inspired by the song where Dagobert gets married. The translation of this cultural reference could have posed a problem, especially in English. For instance, an English translator of Georges Perec, mentioned the issue in the context of their translation notes.

The song stands out as a significant inspiration for some works of Erik Satie. Charles Trenet derived "Le roi Dagobert", his personal version, which was sung by Les Compagnons de la chanson in 1949. On the other hand, singer Colette Renard performed a more ribald version of this song in 1963.

The song appears in the illustrated works of Gustave Doré, notably in his Histoire pittoresque, dramatique et caricaturale de la sainte Russie.

Many films have been adapted from it, including a French-Italian movie by Italian director Dino Risi (1984) titled Good King Dagobert. There is also a silent film by Georges Monca from 1911 and a film by Pierre Chevalier from 1963. The song was part of Geneviève Félix's repertoire.

== Text ==
1. Le bon roi Dagobert,
A mis sa culotte à l'envers ;
Le grand saint Éloi
Lui dit : Ô mon roi!
Votre Majesté
Est mal culottée.
C'est vrai, lui dit le roi,
Je vais la remettre à l'endroit.

2. Comme il la remettait
Un peu il se découvrait ;
Le grand saint Éloi
Lui dit : Ô mon roi !
Vous avez la peau
Plus noire qu'un corbeau.
Bah, bah, lui dit le roi,
La reine l'a bien plus noire que moi.

3. Le bon roi Dagobert
Fut mettre son bel habit vert ;
Le grand saint Éloi
Lui dit : Ô mon roi !
Votre habit paré
Au coude est percé.
C'est vrai, lui dit le roi,
Le tien est bon, prête-le moi.

4. Du bon roi Dagobert
Les bas étaient rongés des vers ;
Le grand saint Éloi
Lui dit : Ô mon roi !
Vos deux bas cadets
Font voir vos mollets.
C'est vrai, lui dit le roi,
Les tiens sont neufs, donne-les moi.

5. Le bon roi Dagobert
Faisait peu sa barbe en hiver ;
Le grand saint Éloi
Lui dit : Ô mon roi !
Il faut du savon
Pour votre menton.
C'est vrai, lui dit le roi,
As-tu deux sous ?
Prête-les moi.

6. Du bon roi Dagobert
La perruque était de travers ;
Le grand saint Éloi
Lui dit : Ô mon roi !
Que le perruquier
Vous a mal coiffé !
C'est vrai, lui dit le roi,
Je prends ta tignasse pour moi.

7. Le bon roi Dagobert
Portait manteau court en hiver ;
Le grand saint Éloi
Lui dit : Ô mon roi !
Votre Majesté
Est bien écourtée.
C'est vrai, lui dit le roi,
Fais-le rallonger de deux doigts.

8. Du bon roi Dagobert
Du chapeau coiffait comme un cerf ;
Le grand saint Éloi
Lui dit : Ô mon roi !
La corne au milieu
Vous siérait bien mieux.
C'est vrai, lui dit le roi,
J'avais pris modèle sur toi.

9. Le roi faisait des vers
Mais il les faisait de travers ;
Le grand saint Éloi
Lui dit : Ô mon roi !
Laissez aux oisons
Faire des chansons.
Eh bien, lui dit le roi,
C'est toi qui les feras pour moi.

10. Le bon roi Dagobert
Chassait dans la plaine d'Anvers ;
Le grand saint Éloi
Lui dit : Ô mon roi !
Votre Majesté
Est bien essouflée.
C'est vrai, lui dit le roi,
Un lapin courait après moi.

11. Le bon roi Dagobert
Allait à la chasse au pivert ;
Le grand saint Éloi
Lui dit : Ô mon roi !
La chasse aux coucous
Vaudrait mieux pour vous.
Eh bien, lui dit le roi,
Je vais tirer, prends garde à toi.

12. Le bon roi Dagobert
Avait un grand sabre de fer ;
Le grand saint Éloi
Lui dit : Ô mon roi !
Votre Majesté
Pourrait se blesser.
C'est vrai, lui dit le roi,
Qu'on me donne un sabre de bois.

13. Les chiens de Dagobert
Étaient de gale tout couverts ;
Le grand saint Éloi
Lui dit : Ô mon roi !
Pour les nettoyer
Faudrait les noyer.
Eh bien, lui dit le roi,
Va-t-en les noyer avec toi.

14. Le bon roi Dagobert
Se battait à tort, à travers ;
Le grand saint Éloi
Lui dit : Ô mon roi !
Votre Majesté
Se fera tuer.
C'est vrai, lui dit le roi,
Mets-toi bien vite devant moi.

15. Le bon roi Dagobert
Voulait conquérir l'univers ;
Le grand saint Éloi
Lui dit : Ô mon roi !
Voyager si loin
Donne du tintoin.
C'est vrai, lui dit le roi,
Il vaudrait mieux rester chez soi.

16. Le roi faisait la guerre
Mais il la faisait en hiver ;
Le grand saint Éloi
Lui dit : Ô mon roi !
Votre Majesté
Se fera geler.
C'est vrai, lui dit le roi,
Je m'en vais retourner chez moi.

17. Le bon roi Dagobert
Voulait s'embarquer pour la mer ;
Le grand saint Éloi
Lui dit : Ô mon roi !
Votre Majesté
Se fera noyer.
C'est vrai, lui dit le roi,
On pourra crier : « Le Roi boit ! ».

18. Le bon roi Dagobert
Avait un vieux fauteuil de fer ;
Le grand saint Éloi
Lui dit : Ô mon roi !
Votre vieux fauteuil
M'a donné dans l'œil.
Eh bien, lui dit le roi,
Fais-le vite emporter chez toi.

19. La reine Dagobert
Choyait un galant assez vert ;
Le grand saint Éloi
Lui dit : Ô mon roi !
Vous êtes cornu,
J'en suis convaincu.
C'est bon, lui dit le roi,
Mon père l'était avant moi.

20. Le bon roi Dagobert
Mangeait en glouton du dessert ;
Le grand saint Éloi
Lui dit : Ô mon roi !
Vous êtes gourmand,
Ne mangez pas tant.
Bah, bah, lui dit le roi,
Je ne le suis pas tant que toi.

21. Le bon roi Dagobert
Ayant bu, allait de travers ;
Le grand saint Éloi Lui dit : Ô mon roi !
Votre Majesté
Va tout de côté.
Eh bien, lui dit le roi,
Quand tu es gris,
marches-tu droit ?

22. A Saint Eloi, dit-on
Dagobert offrit un dindon.
"Un dindon à moi!" lui dit Saint Eloi,
"Votre Majesté a trop de bonté."
"Prends donc", lui dit le roi,
"C'est pour te souvenir de moi."

23. Le bon roi Dagobert
Craignait d'aller en enfer ;
Le grand saint Eloi
Lui dit : Ô mon roi !
Je crois bien, ma foi
Que vous irez tout droit.
C'est vrai, lui dit le roi,
Ne veux-tu pas prier pour moi ?

24. Quand Dagobert mourut,
Le diable aussitôt accourut;
Le grand saint Éloi
Lui dit : Ô mon roi !
Satan va passer,
Faut vous confesser.
Hélas, lui dit le roi,
Ne pourrais-tu mourir pour moi ?

Good King Dagobert,
Has put his breeches on backwards;
The great Saint Eligius
Says to him: Oh, my king!
Your majesty
Is poorly breeched.
That's true, said the King,
I'm going to put them again the right way around.

As he was putting it back on,
Little by little, he uncovered himself;
The great Saint Eligius
Said to him: Oh, my king!
You have the skin
Darker than a crow's.
Bah, bah, said the king,
The queen's is even darker than mine.

Good King Dagobert
Put on his beautiful green robe;
The great Saint Eligius
Said to him: Oh, my king!
Your adorned robe
Is torn at the elbow.
That's true, said the king,
Yours is good, lend it to me.

Good King Dagobert's
Stockings were eaten by worms;
The great Saint Eligius
Said to him: Oh, my king!
Your two younger stockings
Reveal your calves.
That's true, said the king,
Yours are new, give them to me.

Good King Dagobert
Rarely shaved his beard in winter;
The great Saint Eligius
Said to him: Oh, my king!
You need some soap
For your chin.
That's true, said the king,
Do you have two coins?
Lend them to me.

Good King Dagobert's
Wig was crooked;
The great Saint Eligius
Said to him: Oh, my king!
The wig-maker
Has poorly styled you!
That's true, said the king,
I'll take your mane for myself.

Good King Dagobert
Wore a short coat in winter;
The great Saint Eligius
Said to him: Oh, my king!
Your Majesty
Is quite shortened.
That's true, said the king,
Have it lengthened by two fingers.

Good King Dagobert
Wore his hat like a deer's antlers;
The great Saint Eligius
Said to him: Oh, my king!
The horn in the middle
Would suit you much better.
That's true, said the king,
I had taken you as my model.

The king composed verses,
But he composed them crookedly;
The great Saint Eligius
Said to him: Oh, my king!
Leave it to the goslings
To make songs.
Well, said the king,
Then it's you who will make them for me.

Good King Dagobert
Hunted in the plains of Antwerp;
The great Saint Eligius
Said to him: Oh, my king!
Your Majesty
Is quite out of breath.
That's true, said the king,
A rabbit was chasing after me.

Good King Dagobert
Went hunting for woodpeckers;
The great Saint Eligius
Said to him: Oh, my king!
Hunting cuckoos
Would be better for you.
Well, said the king,
I'll shoot, watch out.

Good King Dagobert
Had a large iron sword;
The great Saint Eligius Said
to him: Oh, my king!
Your Majesty
Could get hurt.
It's true, said the king,
Give me a wooden sword.

Dagobert's dogs
Were covered in mange;
The great Saint Eligius
Said to him: Oh, my king!
To clean them up
They should be drowned.
Well, said the king,
Go drown them with you.

Good King Dagobert
Fought haphazardly;
The great Saint Eligius
Said to him: Oh, my king!
Your Majesty
Will get yourself killed.
That's true, said the king,
Quick, stand in front of me.

Good King Dagobert
Wanted to conquer the universe;
The great Saint Eligius
Said to him: Oh, my king!
Traveling so far
Causes a commotion.
That's true, said the king,
It would be better to stay at home.

The king waged war
But he waged it in winter;
The great Saint Eligius
Said to him: Oh, my king!
Your Majesty
Will freeze.
It's true, said the king,
I'll go back home.

Good King Dagobert
Wanted to set sail for the sea;
The great Saint Eligius
Said to him: Oh, my king!
Your Majesty
Will drown.
That's true, said the king,
They can cry: "The King is drinking!"

Good King Dagobert
Had an old iron armchair;
The great Saint Eligius
Said to him: Oh, my king!
Your old armchair
Poked me in the eye.
Well, said the king,
Have it quickly taken away to your place.

Queen Dagobert
Favored a rather green lover;
The great Saint Eligius
Said to him: Oh, my king!
You are horned [fig. meaning, cuckolded],
I am convinced.
It's okay, said the king,
My father was before me.

Good King Dagobert
Ate dessert greedily;
The great Saint Eligius
Said to him, "Oh, my king!
You are a glutton;
Don't eat so much."
Bah, bah, said the king,
I am not as much as you.

Good King Dagobert
After drinking, staggered;
The great Saint Eligius
Said to him, "Oh, my king!
Your Majesty
Is going all over the place."
Well, said the king,
When you're tipsy, do you walk straight?

To Saint Eligius, they say
Dagobert offered a turkey.
"A turkey for me!" said Saint Eligius,
"Your Majesty is too kind."
"Take it then", said the king,
"It's for you to remember me."

Good King Dagobert
Feared going to hell;
The great Saint Eligius
Said to him: Oh, my king!
I believe, by my faith,
You'll go straight there.
That's true, said the king,
Won't you pray for me?

When Dagobert died,
The devil immediately rushed in;
The great Saint Eligius
Said to him: Oh, my king!
Satan is coming,
You must confess.
Alas, said the king,
Couldn't you die for me?
