= Saint Eligius =

Christian bishop and saint (588–660)

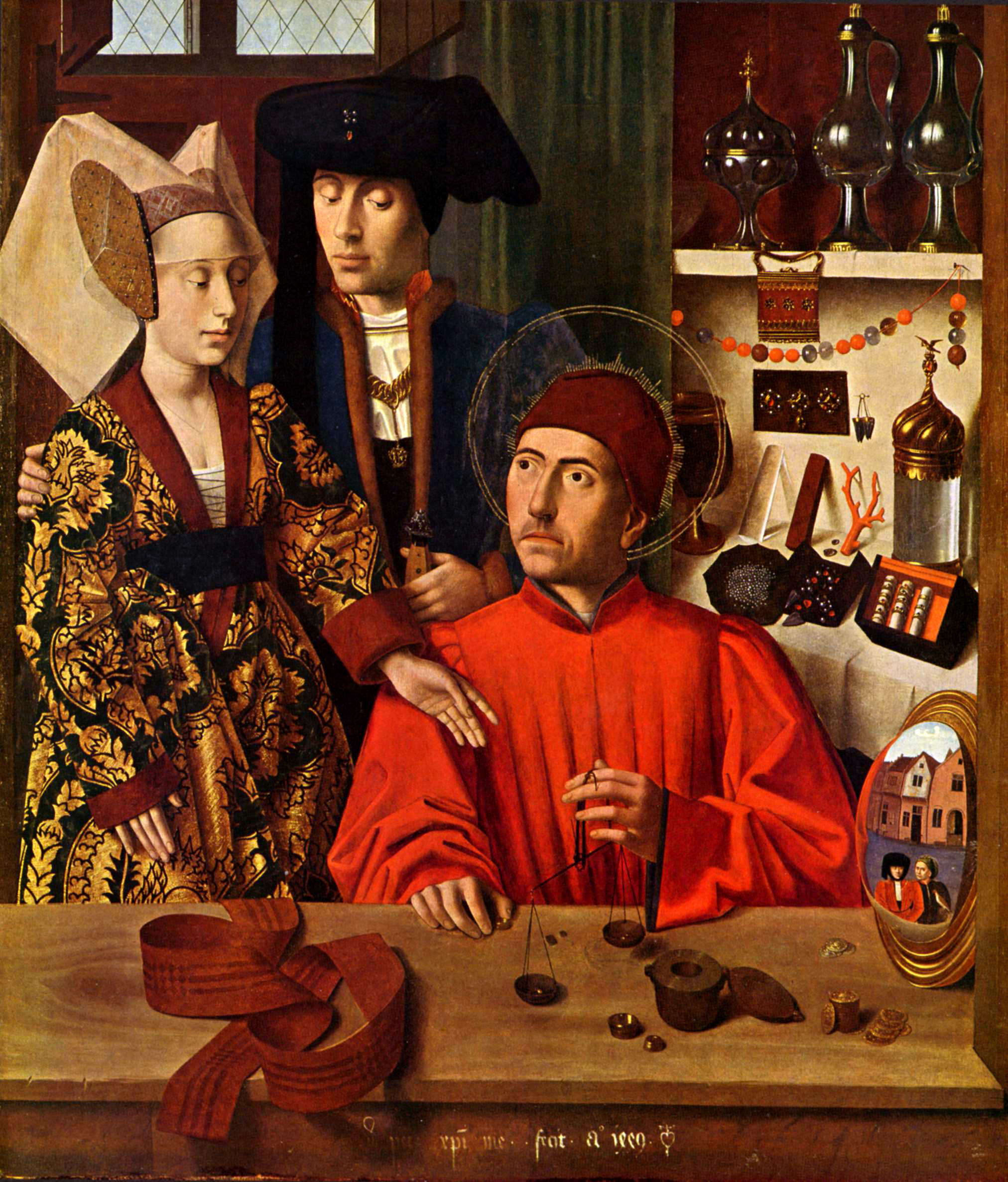
- The Legend of Saint Eligius and Saint Godeberta by Petrus Christus (Note: Although Eligius is said to have presented Godeberta with a gold ring, which is preserved in Noyon Cathedral, the halo, a later overpainting, has since been cleaned away; the painting has therefore been identified as possibly depicting the Bruges goldsmith Willem zan Vlueten.)

Confessor, Bishop
- Born: 11 June 588; Chaptelat, Francia
- Died: 1 December 660 (aged 72); Noyon, Neustria, Francia
- Venerated in: Catholic Church; Eastern Orthodox Church; Anglican Communion
- Canonized: Pre-Congregation
- Feast: 1 December
- Attributes: Anvil; Bishop with a crosier in his right hand, on the open palm of his left a miniature church of chased gold; bishop with a hammer, anvil, and horseshoe; bishop with a horse; courtier; goldsmith; hammer; holding a horse's leg, which he detached from the horse in order to shoe it more easily; horseshoe; man grasping a devil's nose with pincers; man holding a chalice and goldsmith's hammer; man shoeing a horse; man with hammer and crown near a smithy; man with hammer, anvil, and Anthony the Great; pincers; with Godeberta; giving a ring to Godeberta; working as a goldsmith
- Patronage: Cartwrights; clockmakers; coin collectors; craftsmen of all kinds; cutlers; exercise riders and grooms; gilders; goldsmiths; harness makers; horses; jewelers; jockeys; knife makers; laborers; locksmiths; metalworkers in general; miners; minters; Royal Electrical and Mechanical Engineers; Royal Australian Electrical and Mechanical Engineers; saddlers; toolmakers; veterinarians; watchmakers; railway electricians; domestic electricians; mechanics; computer scientists; computer engineers
Signature
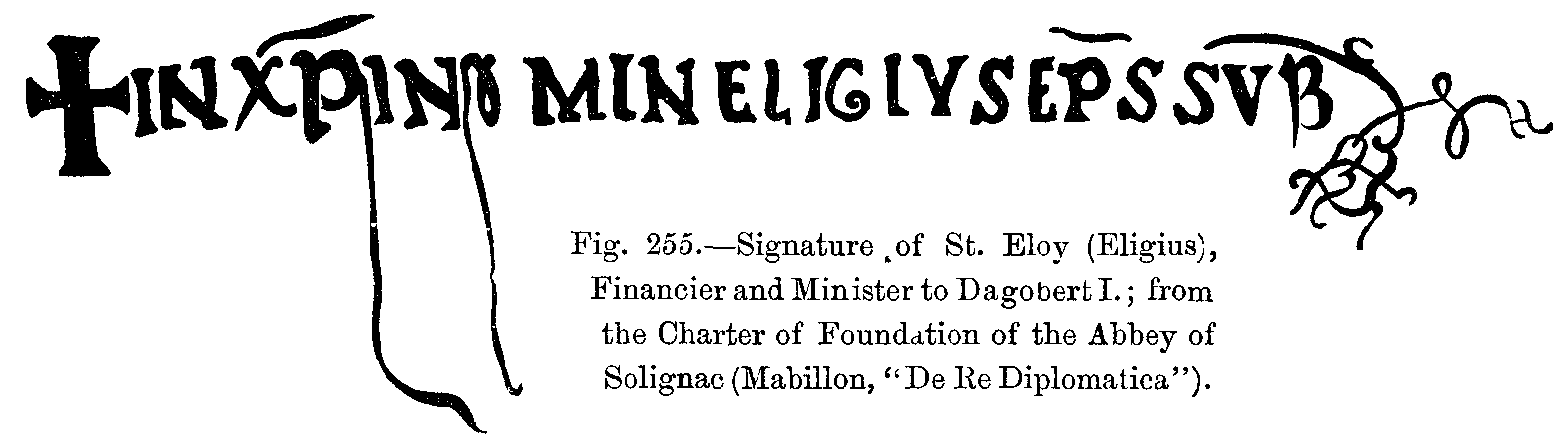

Eligius (Note: Also anglicised from French as Eloi, Eloy or Loye.) (French: Éloi; 11 June 588 – 1 December 660), venerated as Saint Eligius, was a Frankish goldsmith, courtier, and bishop who was chief counsellor to Dagobert I and later Bishop of Noyon–Tournai. His deeds were recorded in Vita Sancti Eligii, written by his friend Audoin of Rouen.

Born into a Gallo-Roman family, Eligius found success as a goldsmith at the Merovingian royal court of Clotaire II and served as chief counsellor to Dagobert I until Dagobert's death in 639. Under the subsequent regency of Nanthild, the queen consort, Eligius was ordained a priest and campaigned against simony in the Church. Appointed Bishop of Noyon–Tournai in 642, he founded many monasteries and churches while working to convert the pagan population of Flanders to Christianity.

Despite his background as a goldsmith, Eligius became increasingly ascetic during his time at the royal court and used his influence to ransom captive slaves and care for the poor. A legend emerged of his having once healed a demon-possessed horse by amputating and miraculously reattaching the horse's foreleg.

Eligius is best known for being the patron saint of horses and those who work with them. He is also the patron saint of goldsmiths, metalworkers, coin collectors, veterinarians, and the Royal Electrical and Mechanical Engineers (REME), a corps of the British Army.

== Biography ==
=== Early life ===
Eligius was born into a Gallo-Roman family at the villa of Chaptelat, Aquitaine (modern-day France), six miles north of Limoges. His father, recognising unusual talent in his son, sent him to the goldsmith Abbo, master of the mint at Limoges. Later Eligius went to Neustria, the palace of the Franks, where he worked under Babo, the royal treasurer, on whose recommendation Clotaire II, king of the Franks, is said to have commissioned Eligius to make a throne of gold adorned with precious stones.

And from that which he had taken for a single piece of work, he was able to make two. Incredibly, he could do it all from the same weight for he had accomplished the work commissioned from him without any fraud or mixture of siliquae, or any other fraudulence. Not claiming fragments bitten off by the file or using the devouring flame of the furnace for an excuse, but filling all faithfully with gems, he happily earned his happy reward.

Among other goldsmithing work soon entrusted to Eligius were the bas-reliefs for the tomb of Germain, Bishop of Paris. Clotaire took Eligius into the royal household and appointed him master of the mint at Marseille.

=== Chief counsellor to Dagobert I: 629–639 ===
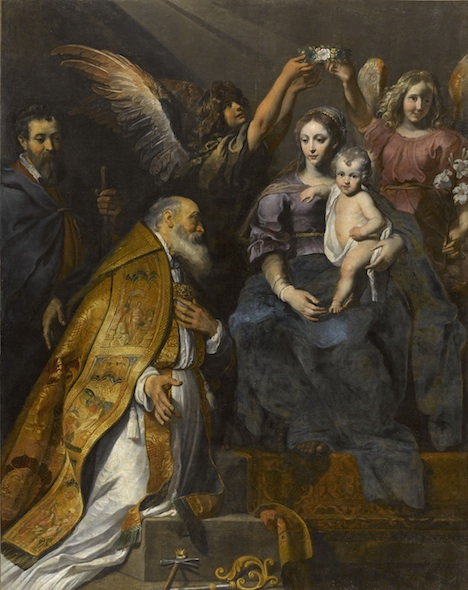
Saint Eligius at the feet of the Virgin and Child by Gerard Seghers

After the death of Clotaire in 629, his son Dagobert I appointed Eligius his chief counsellor. Eligius' reputation spread rapidly, to the extent that ambassadors first sought him out for his counsel and to pay their respects to him before going to the king. He made some enemies. Eligius was able to induce Judicael to make a pact with Dagobert at a meeting at the king's villa of Creil (636–37); this success increased his influence:

Indeed King Dagobert, swift, handsome and famous with no rival among any of the earlier kings of the Franks, loved him so much that he would often take himself out of the crowds of princes, optimates, dukes or bishops around him and seek private counsel from Eligius.

Eligius took advantage of this royal favour to obtain alms for the poor and to ransom captive Romans, Gauls, Bretons, Moors and especially Saxons, who were arriving daily at the slave market in Marseille. He founded several monasteries, and with the king's consent, sent his servants through towns and villages to take down the bodies of criminals who had been executed and give them decent burial.

Eligius was a source of edification at the royal court, where he and his friend Audoin of Rouen lived according to the strict Irish monastic rule that had been introduced into Gaul by Columbanus. Eligius introduced this rule, either entirely or in part, into the monastery of Solignac near Limoges, which he founded in 632 at a villa he had purchased, and also at the convent he founded at Paris, where three hundred virgins were under the guidance of the Abbess Aurea. He also built the basilica of St. Paul and restored the basilica at Paris that was devoted to Martial, the patron bishop-saint of Limoges. Eligius also erected several fine tombs in honour of the relics of Martin of Tours, the national saint of the Franks, and Denis, who was chosen patron saint by the king.

=== Service under Nanthild: 639–642 ===
On the death of Dagobert in 639, the queen consort Nanthild took the reins of government, the king Clovis II being a child. During this regency, Eligius was ordained into the priesthood in 640. He then launched a successful campaign against simony in the Church which resulted in a royal order banning the sale of pontifical offices and mandating that such offices be earned through having good character and an ethical life.

=== Bishop of Noyon–Tournai: 642–660 ===
On the death of Acarius, Bishop of Noyon–Tournai, on 14 March 642, Eligius was made his successor, with the unanimous approbation of clergy and people. "So the unwilling goldsmith was tonsured and constituted guardian of the towns or municipalities of Vermandois which include the metropolis, Tournai, which was once a royal city, and Noyon and Ghent and Kortrijk of Flanders."

The inhabitants of his new diocese were pagans for the most part. He undertook the conversion of the Flemings, Frisians, Suevi, and the other Germanic tribes along the North Sea coast. He made frequent missionary excursions and also founded a great many monasteries and churches. In his own episcopal city of Noyon he built and endowed a nunnery for virgins. After the finding of the body of Quentin of Amiens, Eligius erected in the saint's honour a church to which was joined a monastery under Irish rule. He also discovered the bodies of Piatus of Tournai and his martyred companions, and in 654 removed the remains of Fursey, the celebrated Irish missionary (died 650).

Saint Eloi Bishop of Noyon by Albrecht De Vriendt

=== Legend of the shoeing of the horse ===
There is a legend that Eligius resolved the problem of a horse reluctant to be shod. He thought it was possessed by demons, so he cut off the horse's foreleg and, while the horse stood on the remaining three legs and watched, he re-shod the hoof on the amputated leg, before miraculously reattaching the leg to the horse.

=== Death and legacy ===
Eligius died on 1 December 660 and was buried at Noyon.

Audoin of Rouen recorded the life and deeds of Eligius in his hagiography, Vita Sancti Eligii. At one point, Audoin lovingly recalls Eligius' increasingly ascetical appearance during their time serving at the royal court:

He was tall with a rosy face. He had a pretty head of hair with curly locks. His hands were honest and his fingers long. He had the face of an angel and a prudent look. At first, he was used to wear gold and gems on his clothes, having belts composed of gold and gems and elegantly jeweled purses, linens covered with red metal and golden sacs hemmed with gold and all of the most precious fabrics including all of silk. But all of this was but fleeting ostentation from the beginning and beneath he wore a hairshirt next to his flesh and, as he proceeded to perfection, he gave the ornaments for the needs of the poor. Then you would see him, whom you had once seen gleaming with the weight of the gold and gems that covered him, go covered in the vilest clothing with a rope for a belt.

Besides Eligius' self-mortification, Audoin recalls his propensity for weeping, "For he had the great grace of tears."

Several writings of Eligius have survived: a sermon in which he combats the pagan practices of his time, a homily on the Last Judgment and a letter written in 645 in which he begs for the prayers of Bishop Desiderius of Cahors. There are fourteen other pseudepigraphical homilies that are no longer attributed to him. An important study about his work as a goldsmith was contributed by the German scholar Hayo Vierck to the Joachim Werner Festschrift in 1974.

== Veneration ==
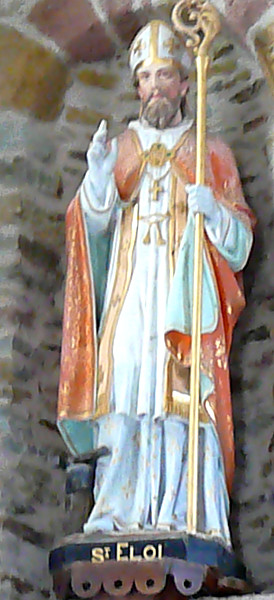
Statue of Saint Eligius in the church of St. Marcel in St. Marcel (Aveyron), France. At the saint's right foot are the tools of his original trade.

The feast day of Eligius is celebrated on 1 December. Eligius is particularly honored in Flanders, in the province of Antwerp, and at Tournai, Kortrijk, Ghent, Bruges, and Douai. During the Middle Ages his relics were the object of special veneration and were repeatedly divided and transferred to other resting places, in 881, 1066, 1137, 1255, and 1306. A good deal of legend has gathered around the life of Eligius, who is still very popular with goldsmiths, farriers and car mechanics.

== Patronage ==
Eligius is the patron saint of horses and cattle and is also the patron saint of goldsmiths, blacksmiths, (Note: The exceptions being English goldsmiths and blacksmiths who adopted Dunstan as their patron saint.) metalworkers in general, numismatists/coin collectors and the British Army corps of Royal Electrical and Mechanical Engineers (REME). He is also the patron saint of electricians, computer scientists, mechanics, miners, security guards, gas station workers, taxi cab drivers, farmers, and servants.

A mass is celebrated around 9 December at Notre Dame de Paris for members of the Confraternity of Saint Éloi. This follows the tradition of the May offering, usually a religious painting, made to the Cathedral between 1630 and 1707 by the goldsmiths of Paris. The tradition of the Guild Chapel was revived in 1953 by the Paris goldsmiths who provided the altar, crucifix above it and a statue of Eligius.

== Iconography ==
Eligius is invariably depicted in bishop's garb, alongside his emblem, a goldsmith's hammer. The only exceptions are the illustrations to Vita Sancti Eligii that depict episodes before his investiture as bishop. He is generally represented as a bishop, a crosier in his right hand, holding a miniature church of chased gold in the open palm of his left hand.

The Petrus Christus panel of 1449 illustrating this article, since the removal of its overpainted halo in 1993, is now recognised in the Lehman Collection at the Metropolitan Museum of Art as the Vocational Portrait of a Goldsmith, and not as a depiction of Eligius.

The legend of the shoeing of the horse is depicted in a pre-Reformation carving in the Wincanton Parish Church, Slapton Church Northamptonshire, England, a tapestry in the Hospices de Beaune (Hotel Dieu) in Beaune, France, as a fresco on the wall of Aarhus Cathedral, Denmark, as well as in a 14th-century painting attributed to Niccolo di Pietro Gerini in the Petit Palais in Avignon, France. The painting was confiscated from an Austrian collector by the Germans during World War II and was restituted to the heirs of the original owners in March 2013 by the French Ministry of Culture.

== See also ==
- St Andrew's Church, Hempstead, a church in England from which a panel depicting Saint Eligius was stolen in 1982.
- St. Elsewhere, an American medical drama set in the fictional "St. Eligius Hospital"
- Le bon roi Dagobert, a French nursery rhyme about Eligius and King Dagobert I
- Saint Eligius, patron saint archive
