= Veuillez rendre l'âme (à qui elle appartient) =

Studio album by Noir Désir
- Released: January 29, 1989
- Studio: ICP Recording Studios, Brussels, Belgium
- Genre: Rock
- Length: 36:26
- Label: Universal; PolyGram
- Producer: Ian Broudie

Noir Désir chronology
Où veux tu qu'je r'garde? (1987)	Veuillez rendre l'âme (à qui elle appartient) (1989)	Du ciment sous les plaines (1991)

Professional ratings
Review scores
Source	Rating
AllMusic	link

Veuillez rendre l'âme (à qui elle appartient) (French for "Please return the soul (to its owner)") is the second album by French rock band Noir Désir, released on January 29, 1989. The album, produced by Ian Broudie, brought the group widespread attention, mostly because of the hit single "Aux sombres héros de l'amer." The album did well both critically and commercially, selling 330,000 copies. The French edition of Rolling Stone magazine named this album the 10th greatest French rock album (out of 100).

"Aux sombres héros de l'amer" entered the Top 50 French Singles chart, which worried the group because they claimed the song was not indicative of the rest of the album. They used the fame the song brought them to win over a larger fan base.

== Track listing ==
All music composed by Noir Désir; all lyrics composed by Bertrand Cantat

== Track listing ==
No.	Title	Length
1.	"À l'arrière des taxis"	3:10
2.	"Aux sombres héros de l'amer"	2:58
3.	"Le Fleuve"	3:48
4.	"What I Need"	3:23
5.	"Apprends à dormir"	3:01
6.	"Sweet Mary"	2:01
7.	"La Chaleur"	3:39
8.	"Les Écorchés"	4:09
9.	"Joey I"	3:00
10.	"Joey II"	2:25
11.	"The Wound"	4:36
