= Le Temps des cerises =

1866 French song

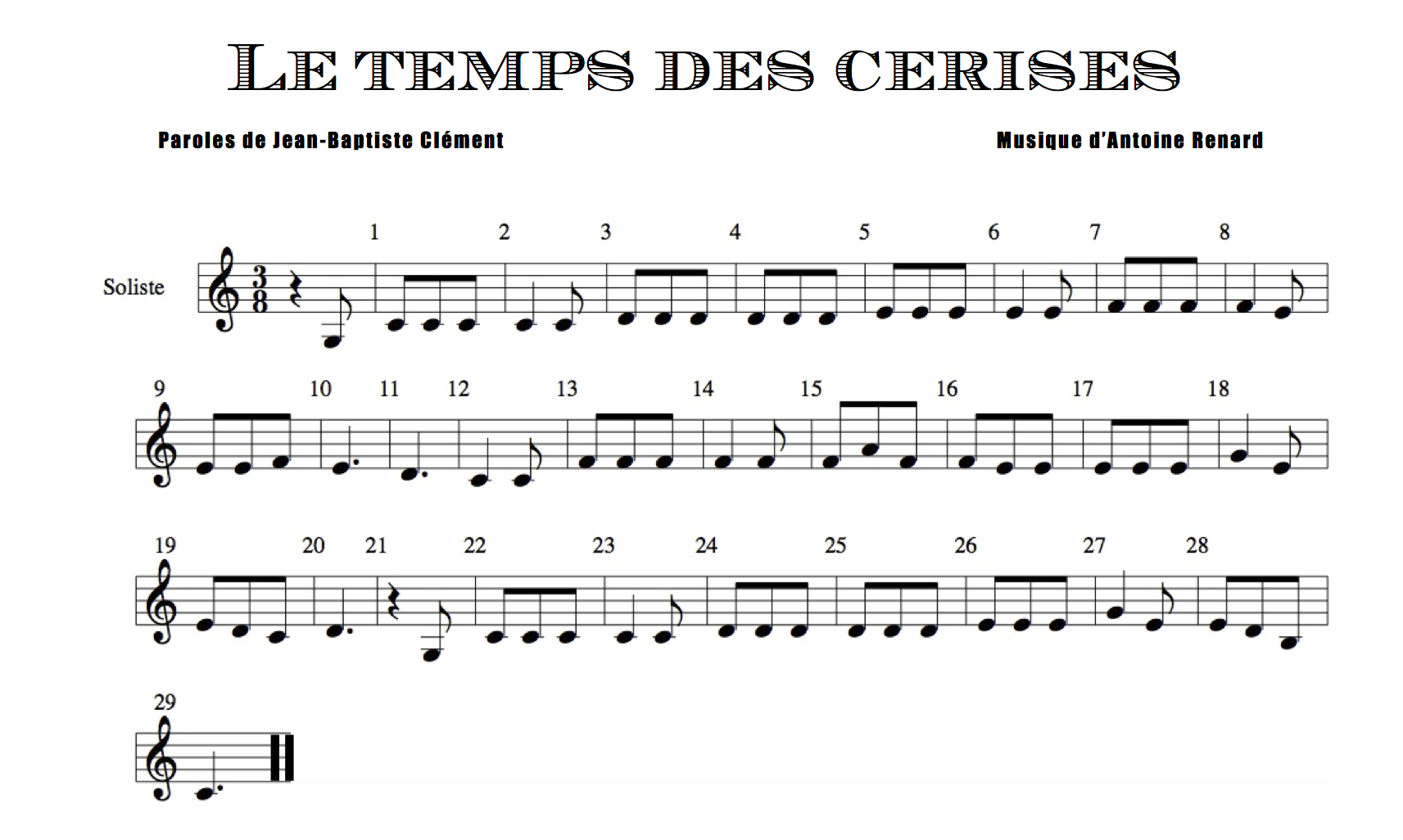
Le Temps des cerises

Le Temps des cerises (French: [lə tɑ̃ de səʁiz], The Time of Cherries) is a French song written in 1866, with lyrics by Jean-Baptiste Clément and music by Antoine Renard and is very famous in French-speaking countries. The song was later strongly associated with the Paris Commune, during which verses were added to the song, thus making it a revolutionary song. The "Time of Cherries" is a metaphor regarding what life will be like when a revolution will have changed social and economic conditions. It is believed to be dedicated by the writer to a nurse who fought in the semaine sanglante ("Bloody Week") when French government troops overthrew the commune.

For its hourly chime, the town hall clock in the Parisian suburb of Saint-Denis alternates between two different tunes, "Le roi Dagobert a mis sa culotte à l'envers" and "Le temps des cerises".

This song inspired the Communist Party of Bohemia and Moravia to adopt two cherries as part of their logo and the French Communist Party to adopt a new logo in 2018. It was also symbol of The Left, political party in Luxembourg.

== Lyrics ==
There are many versions of the original lyrics, but the following is the version popularised by the singer Yves Montand, with possible variants given in parentheses:

Quand nous chanterons le temps des cerises (Quand nous en serons au temps des cerises)
Et gai rossignol et merle moqueur
Seront tous en fête
Les belles auront la folie en tête
Et les amoureux du soleil au cœur
Quand nous chanterons le temps des cerises
Sifflera bien mieux le merle moqueur

Mais il est bien court le temps des cerises
Où l'on s'en va deux cueillir en rêvant
Des pendants d'oreille...
Cerises d'amour aux robes pareilles (vermeilles)
Tombant sous la feuille (mousse) en gouttes de sang...
Mais il est bien court le temps des cerises
Pendants de corail qu'on cueille en rêvant !

Quand vous en serez au temps des cerises
Si vous avez peur des chagrins d'amour
Évitez les belles!
Moi qui ne crains pas les peines cruelles
Je ne vivrai pas (point) sans souffrir un jour...
Quand vous en serez au temps des cerises
Vous aurez aussi des chagrins (peines) d'amour !

J'aimerai toujours le temps des cerises
C'est de ce temps-là que je garde au cœur
Une plaie ouverte !
Et Dame Fortune, en m'étant offerte
Ne pourra jamais calmer (fermer) ma douleur...
J'aimerai toujours le temps des cerises
Et le souvenir que je garde au cœur !

== See also ==
- List of socialist songs

== Appearances in other media ==
- In the movie Porco Rosso, Madame Gina sings "Le Temps des cerises" in the cabaret.
