= Serge Teyssot-Gay =

French musician (born 1963)

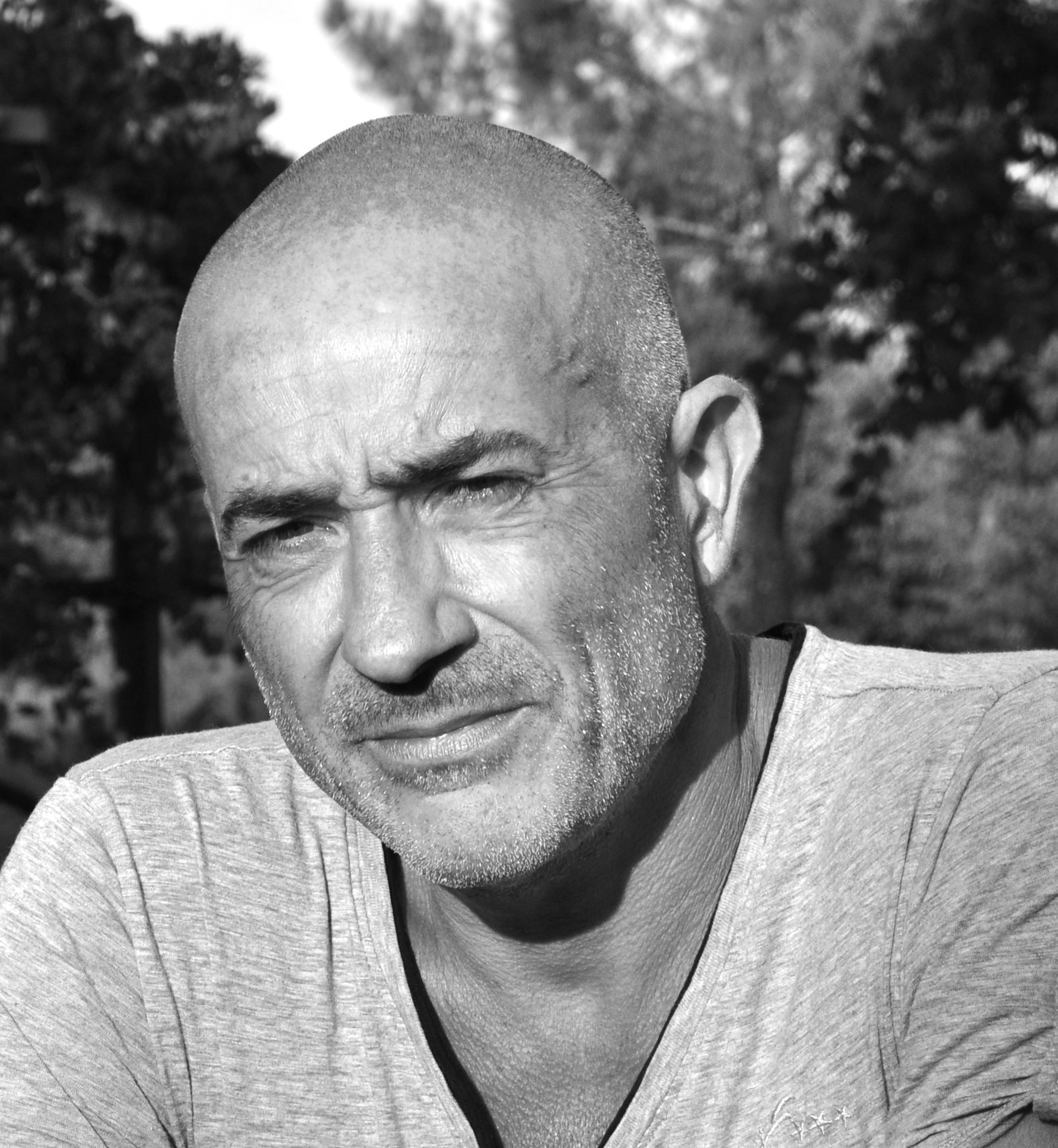
Serge Teyssot-Gay in 2013

Serge Teyssot-Gay (French pronunciation: [sɛʁʒə tesɔ.ɡɛ]; born 16 May 1963 in Saint-Étienne, Loire) is a French musician. He was the guitarist of rock group Noir Désir until 29 November 2010. He met the other members of the band at school in Bordeaux (Lycée Saint-Genès) in the 1980s. Aside from Noir Désir, his other musical endeavours include:

- the trio "Zone libre", which became a quintet for 6 albums and tours
- the guitar-oud duo with Khaled AlJaramani known as Interzone
- works with writers: music and literature (Musical readings with authors, or setting literary texts to music, live and CD books)
- two solo albums: "Silence radio" (1996) and "On croit qu'on en est sorti" (2000)

At the beginning of his music career, he favoured the use of the Gibson Les Paul guitar. However, since the release of Noir Désir's 1996 album 666.667 Club, a custom Fender Stratocaster closely resembling the Lite Ash model has become his most frequently used guitar. His brand new one is a Meloduende model "Black Sword".

== Discography ==
=== Solo ===
- 1996 : Silence Radio
- 2000 : On croit qu'on en est sorti

=== With Interzone ===
- 2005 : Interzone
- 2007 : Deuxième Jour
- 2013 : Waiting For Spring
- 2019 : Kan Ya Ma Kan
- 2024 : Waslat

=== With Zone Libre ===
- 2007 : Faites vibrer la chair
- 2009 : L'Angle Mort ( with Casey & Hamé )
- 2011 : Les Contes du Chaos ( with Casey and B.James)
- 2015 : Zone Libre PolyUrbaine ( with Mike Ladd and Marc Nammour)
- 2017 : Debout dans les cordages (with Marc Nammour)
- 2017 : Kit de Survie (en milieu hostile) (with Akosh.s, Médéric Collignon, Mike Ladd and Marc Nammour)

=== With Joëlle Léandre ===
- 2012 : TRANS
- 2015 : TRANS 2

=== With Kintsugi ===
- 2017 : Yoshitsune, with Kakushin Nishihara et Gaspar Claus (Intervalle Triton/Les disques du Festival Permanent/ L’Autre Distribution )

=== With Xie Yugang 谢玉岗 ===
- 2018 : A Nano World 一幀世紀

=== With Carol Robinson ===
- 2024 : The Weather Pieces (Mode Records)
- 2025 : Stop Killing Us

=== CD-Books ===
- 2002 : Contre ISBN 2843351324 with Lydie Salvayre
- 2006 : Dis pas ça ISBN 2070777219 with Lydie Salvayre
- 2007 : Des millions de morts se battent entre eux ISBN 2914192231 with Krzysztof Styczynski
- 2008 : Attila József, à cœur pur ISBN 9782020967990 with Denis Lavant
- 2016 : Ripostes, with Michel Bulteau, Krzysztof Styczynski and Saul Williams

=== Collaborations ===
- 1993 : Hunger of a Thin Man by Théo Hakola
- 1997 : Blues Stories by Little Bob
- 1998 : 1000 Vietnam by Giorgio Canali
- 2000 : Faux-ami by Marc Sens
- 2001 : Who defecates in your head Bob? by Quincannon
- 2002 : Contre with Lydie Salvayre
- 2004 : Paris nous nourrit, Paris nous affame on the album "Regain de Tension" by the rap group La Rumeur
- 2006 : Dis pas ça with Lydie Salvayre
- 2007 : Je suis une bande ethnique à moi tout seul on the album "Du Cœur à l'Outrage" also by La Rumeur
- 2007 : Des millions de morts se battent entre eux by Krzysztof Styczynski
- 2007 : Je cherche (recorded in 2004) on the album "1997-2007 Les Inédits" by La Rumeur
- 2007 : Le Syndrome du polo vert (et marron rayé) sur l'album Spoke Orkestra n'existe pas de Spoke Orkestra
- 2009 : J'ai rien compris mais je suis d'accord de Nonstop
- 2011 : Conversation #1 sur l'album Sutures de Franco Mannara
- 2014 : Omar sur l'album La Nausée de La Canaille
- 2016: Silencio Ondulado sur l'album Al Viento de Pedro Soler et Gaspar Claus
- 2018: Mycelium du Jacky Molard Quartet
