= List of 16 Horsepower band members =

The alternative country music group Sixteen Horsepower (briefly known as Horsepower) formed in 1992 in Los Angeles, prior to relocating to Denver. They were founded by vocalist and multi-instrumentalist David Eugene Edwards, drummer Jean-Yves Tola, and bassist Pascal Humbert, mixing country rock with traditional bluegrass, gospel and Appalachian instrumentation. While Edwards and Tola have played in every incarnation of the group, Humbert left in 1993 and was replaced by Kevin Soll; Humbert returned in 1996 and has played in all subsequent incarnations. In addition to its three founding members, the band has included two bassists, two guitarists, and five additional guest musicians.

They disbanded in 2005 and reformed in 2025.

== Member history chart ==
Members listed in the third column were touring and/or live guest musicians during the period indicated.

Sixteen Horsepower line-ups
(1992–1993) as Horsepower	David Eugene Edwards – lead vocals, guitar, banjo, Chemnitzer concertina, hurdy-gurdy, lap steel, bandoneon; Jean-Yves Tola – drums, vocals; Pascal Humbert – bass, vocals
(1993–1996) as Sixteen Horsepower	David Eugene Edwards – lead vocals, guitar, banjo, Chemnitzer concertina, hurdy-gurdy, lap steel, bandoneon; Jean-Yves Tola – drums, vocals; Kevin Soll – upright bass, vocals		Shametown 7" (1994); 16 Horsepower EP (1995); Sackcloth 'n' Ashes (1996); Olden (2003)
(1996)	David Eugene Edwards – lead vocals, guitar, banjo, Chemnitzer concertina, hurdy-gurdy, lap steel, bandoneon; Jean-Yves Tola – drums, vocals; Pascal Humbert – guitar, vocals; Kevin Soll – upright bass, vocals
(1996)	David Eugene Edwards – lead vocals, guitar, banjo, Chemnitzer concertina, hurdy-gurdy, lap steel, bandoneon; Jean-Yves Tola – drums, vocals; Pascal Humbert – guitar, vocals; Rob Reddick – bass, vocals	Bob Ferbrache – steel guitar (1996)
(1997–1998)	David Eugene Edwards – lead vocals, guitar, banjo, Chemnitzer concertina, hurdy-gurdy, lap steel, bandoneon; Jean-Yves Tola – drums, vocals; Pascal Humbert – bass, upright bass, vocals; Jeffrey-Paul Norlander – fiddle, guitar, cello, organ, vocals		Low Estate (1998)
(1998)	David Eugene Edwards – lead vocals, guitar, banjo, Chemnitzer concertina, hurdy-gurdy, lap steel, bandoneon; Jean-Yves Tola – drums, piano, vocals; Pascal Humbert – bass, upright bass, vocals; Jeffrey-Paul Norlander – fiddle, guitar, cello, organ, vocals; Steve Taylor – guitar, keyboards
(1998–2001)	David Eugene Edwards – lead vocals, guitar, banjo, Chemnitzer concertina, hurdy-gurdy, lap steel, bandoneon; Jean-Yves Tola – drums, piano, vocals; Pascal Humbert – bass, upright bass, vocals; Steve Taylor – guitar, keyboards	Elin Palmer – violin (2000)	Hoarse (2000); Secret South (2001); Live March 2001 (2008)
(2001–2005)	David Eugene Edwards – lead vocals, guitar, banjo, Chemnitzer concertina, hurdy-gurdy, lap steel, bandoneon; Jean-Yves Tola – drums, vocals; Pascal Humbert – bass, upright bass, acoustic guitar, vocals	Daniel McMahon – organ (2002); John Rumly – guitar, bass, banjo (2002)	Folklore (2002)
(2025–present)	David Eugene Edwards – lead vocals, guitar, banjo, Chemnitzer concertina, hurdy-gurdy, lap steel, bandoneon; Jean-Yves Tola – drums, vocals; Pascal Humbert – bass, upright bass, acoustic guitar, vocals	Chuck French – guitar, vocals
