= Détroit =

French musical duo

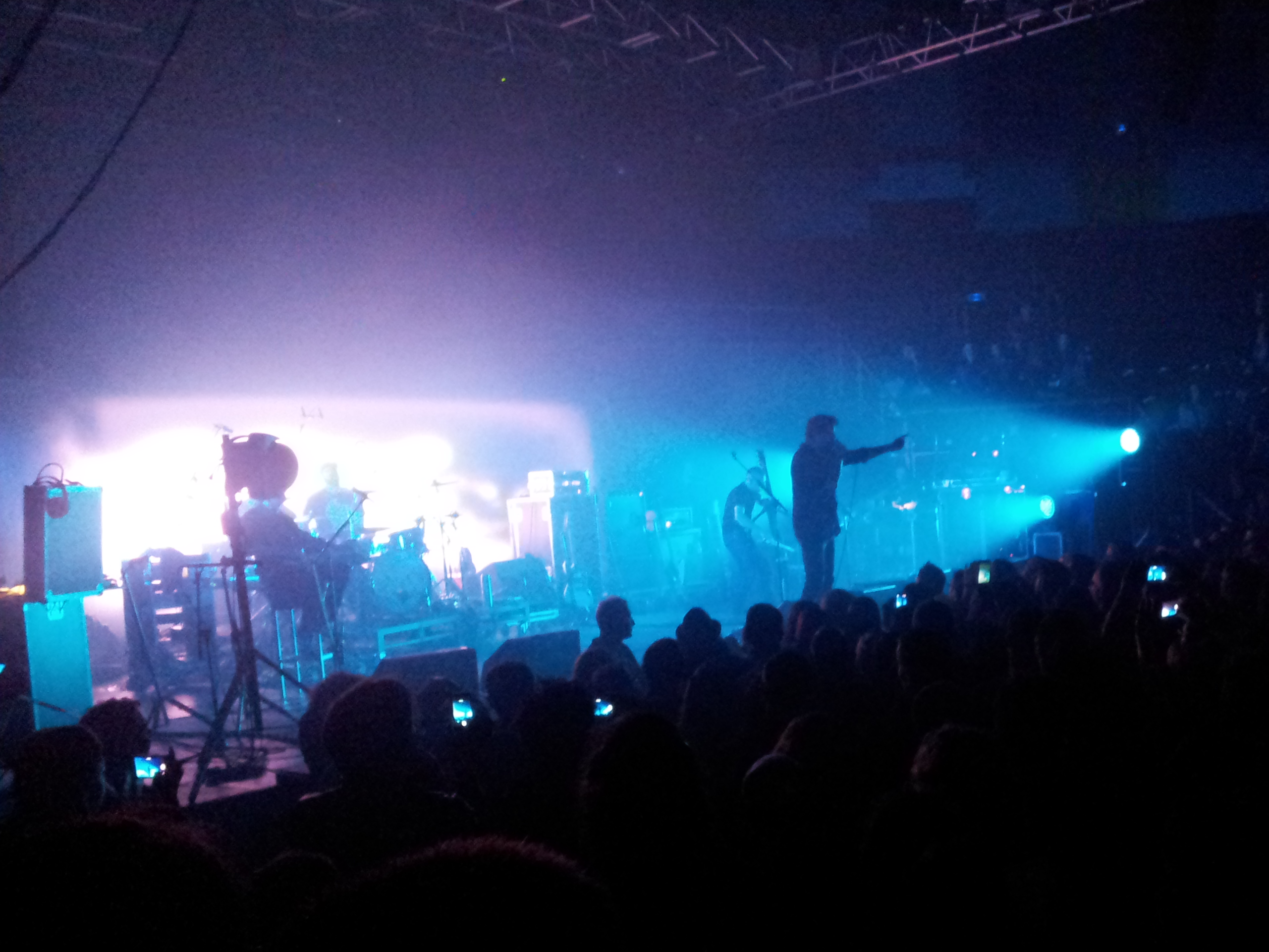
- Detroit concert at Cirque Jules-Verne in Amiens.2014

Background information
- Origin: France
- Genres: Soft rock
- Years active: 2012–present
- Members: Bertrand Cantat; Pascal Humbert

This is about a French musical duo of Bertrand Cantat and Pascal Humbert. For the American city, see Detroit. For the US spinoff of rock group The Detroit Wheels, see Detroit (band)

Détroit is a French musical duo formed in 2012 by French rock musician Bertrand Cantat and French bass player Pascal Humbert. Pascal Humbert was part of the rock formation Passion Fodder from 1985 to 1991 before they split up and Cantat established his own famous band Noir Désir, whereas Humbert went on to join the American band 16 Horsepower, and later to Lilium and Wovenhand, amongst others.

The duo Détroit released their greatly expected début album Horizons on 18 November 2013. It was recorded in Vega Studios and produced by Pascal Humbert and Bruno Green. The début release from the album is "Droit dans le soleil" that appeared in the SNEP Top 10 in its first week of release. It has also charted in Belgium's French records market and in Switzerland.

The formation of the duo follows the break up of Cantat's band Noir Désir in 2010. The two collaborated in 2011 in the album Chœurs with musicians Bernard Falaise and Alexander MacSween. The music was composed for Wajdi Mouawad's production of a trilogy from Sophocles titled Le Cycle des Femmes: Trois histoires de Sophocle or just Des Femmes.

== Discography ==
=== Albums ===
Year	Album	Peak positions				Certification
Year	Album	FR	BEL (Vl)	BEL (Wa)	SWI	Certification
2013	Horizons	2	160	5	10	
2014	La Cigale	11	–	25	57	

=== Singles ===
Year	Singles	Peak positions			Certification	Album
Year	Singles	FR	BEL (Wa)	SWI	Certification	Album
2013	"Droit dans le soleil"	9	14	62		Horizons
