= Droit dans le soleil =

Single by Détroit

from the album Horizons
- Released: October 2013
- Recorded: 2013
- Genre: Soft rock
- Label: Barclays Records / Universal Music
- Songwriters: Bertrand Cantat; Pascal Humbert; Wajdi Mouawad
- Producers: Bertrand Cantat; Pascal Humbert; Bruno Green

Détroit singles chronology
"/"	"Droit dans le soleil"

"Droit dans le soleil" is the debut single of the French musical duo Détroit. It was released on Barclay Records and distributed by Universal Music. The single is a prelude to the debut album of the duo Horizons due on 18 November 2013. The song is written by the duo members Bertrand Cantat and Pascal Humbert and by Lebanese-Quebec artist Wajdi Mouawad after Mouawad cooperated with them in the album release Chœurs relating to his theatrical work Le Cycle des Femmes: Trois histoires de Sophocle. The single was recorded in Vega Studio in France and was produced by Cantat, Humbert and Bruno Green.

== Charts ==
Chart (2013)	Peak position
Ultratop Belgian (Wallonia) Singles Chart	14
SNEP French Singles Chart	9
Hitparade Swiss Singles Chart	62
