= Pascal Humbert =

French bassist

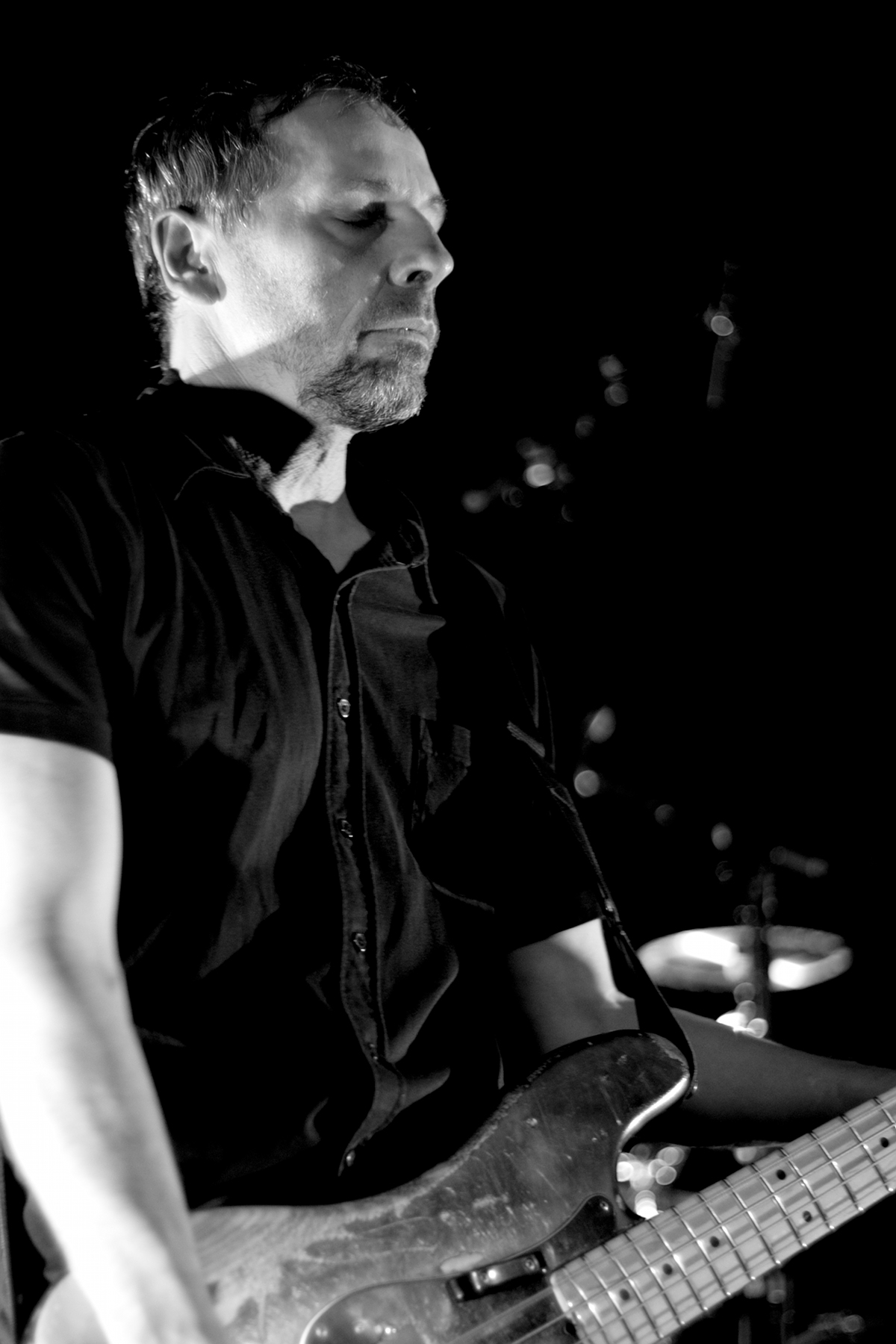

Background information
- Born: France
- Occupation: Musician
- Instrument: Bass guitar
- Years active: 1980–present

Pascal Humbert is a French bass player who is a member of Lilium and Détroit. He was previously in Tanit (1981–1985), Passion Fodder (1985–1991), 16 Horsepower (1992–1993, 1996–2005, 2025-) and Wovenhand (2008–2010).

== Career ==
=== Tanit ===
Humbert's first artistic involvement was with Tanit, a band he formed in Paris in 1981 with Elsa Drezner and Thierry Bertomeu. The band released two EP records, Can an Actor Bleed and To Alaska before splitting up in 1985.

=== Passion Fodder ===
After meeting Theo Hakola, he travelled to the United States and established himself in Los Angeles as part of Hakola's band Passion Fodder from 1985 until 1991, releasing five studio albums.

=== 16 Horsepower ===
After Passion Fodder disbanded, he founded the band Horsepower with David Eugene Edwards and Jean-Yves Tola. Frustrated by misconceptions about the name Horsepower being related to heroin use, and inspired by a traditional American folk song about sixteen horses pulling the coffin of a beloved to the graveyard, the name was changed to 16 Horsepower.

The band was active from 1992 to 2005. Their first release was the eponymous 16 Horsepower EP. When Humbert temporarily left in 1993, he was replaced by Keven Soll as bass player. Humbert rejoined in 1996 and stayed with the band. Other members at various points included Rob Redick in 1996, Jeffrey-Paul Norlander in 1997 and Steve Taylor in 1998.

The debut full-length studio album Sackcloth 'n Ashes was released in 1996, garnering praise from the international music press followed by Low Estate and Secret South.

After releasing four studio albums, 2 EPs and after touring extensively, the group broke up in 2005, citing "mostly political and spiritual" differences. They reunited in 2026 for a European tour and one US festival show.

=== Lilium ===
Humbert started Lilium as a solo project in 1984, but the first album Transmission of All the Goodbyes was only completed and released in 2000. Jean-Yves Tola (also of 16 Horsepower) became involved and the second album Short Stories was released in 2003, with guest musicians, singers and lyricists, including David Eugene Edwards, Kal Cahoone, Daniel McMahon, Jim Kalin, and Dana Colley and Billy Conway (of Morphine). The sound incorporated both American folk music and European musical heritage. After 16 Horsepower disbanded in 2005, Lilium expanded into a full band with the addition of Bruno Green and singer Kal Cahoone. In 2009, Lilium finished their third record, Felt. The band returned to being a two-piece, now featuring Humbert and Green.

=== Wovenhand ===
After the split-up of 16 Horsepower in 2005, Pascal Humbert played solo and within the band Santa Cruz as a double bass player, until he was contacted by a newly formed Wovenhand by David Eugene Edwards, and Ordy Garrison, and joined them in their European leg of tours before being integrated in the official line-up in 2008 and in recording of albums by the band. He left before the recording of their 2012 release The Laughing Stalk.

=== Détroit ===
Humbert's most recent collaboration has been the formation of the duo Détroit with Bertrand Cantat, formerly of Noir Désir. Their debut album Horizons was released in 2013.

=== Other ===
Humbert and Cantat were also part of a collaborative project for Lebanese-Quebec artist Wajdi Mouawad in Le Cycle des Femmes: Trois histoires de Sophocle (known as Femmes trilogy) within the context of Festival d'Avignon. The resulting 17-track album Chœurs of Greek choir renditions for the play was credited to Cantat, Humbert, guitarist Bernard Falaise and drummer Alexander MacSween.

== Discography ==
=== Albums ===
with Tanit

- 1983: Can an Actor Bleed (EP)
- 1984: To Alaska (EP)
- 2007: 1981 — 1985 (compilation album)

with Passion Fodder

- 1985: Hard Words from a Soft Mouth
- 1986: Fat Tuesday
- 1987: Love, Waltzes and Anarchy
- 1989: Woke Up This Morning
- 1991: What Fresh Hell Is This?
- 1998: 1985–1991 And Bleed That River Dry (compilation album)

with 16 Horsepower

- 1997: Low Estate
- 2000: Secret South
- 2001: Nobody 'Cept You (EP)
- 2001: Hoarse (live album)
- 2002: Folklore
- 2003: Olden (3 live sessions)
- 2008: Live March 2001 (live album)
- 2011: Yours Truly (compilation album)

with Lilium

- 2000: Transmission of All the Good-Byes
- 2003: Short Stories
- 2010: Felt

with Wovenhand

- 2008: Ten Stones
- 2010: The Threshingfloor
- 2011: Black of the Ink (EP and book)
- 2012: Live at Roepaen (live CD or 2 LPs + DVD)

Bertrand Cantat, Pascal Humbert, Bernard Falaise, Alexander MacSween

- 2011: Chœurs

with Détroit

- 2013: Horizons

=== Singles ===
with 16 Horsepower

- 1994: "Shametown"
- 1996: "Black Soul Choir"
- 1996: "Haw"
- 1997: "For Heaven's Sake"
- 1997: "Coal Black Horses"
- 1998: "The Partisan"
- 2000: "Clogger"
- 2001: "Splinters"

with Détroit

- 2013: "Droit dans le soleil"

=== Various collaborations ===
- With Theo Hakola on his albums "Hunger of a Thin Man" (1993) and "The Confession" (1995)
- With Rob Ellis and John Parish in album Little Scratches
- With Bruno Green in God's Country
- With Alain Raoust in La Cage (2002) and L'Été indien (2007)
