= Woven Hand (album) =

Studio album by Woven Hand
- Released: March 25, 2002 (UK): March 29, 2002 (Fr); March 4, 2003 (US)
- Genres: Neofolk; Folk
- Labels: Glitterhouse (UK): Fargo (Fr); Sounds Familyre (US)
- Producer: David Eugene Edwards

Woven Hand chronology
Woven Hand (2002)	Blush (2003)

Professional ratings
Review scores
Source	Rating
AllMusic	3/5 stars

Woven Hand is the debut album by David Eugene Edwards' Woven Hand.

== Track listings ==
1. The Good Hand
2. My Russia
3. Blue Pail Fever
4. Glass Eye
5. Wooden Brother
6. Ain't No Sunshine
7. Story and Pictures
8. Arrowhead
9. Your Russia
10. Last Fist
- "Ain't No Sunshine" is a cover of the song of the same name by Bill Withers.
- Four of the songs ("Ain't No Sunshine," "My Russia," "Your Russia" and "Story and Pictures") appear on Blush/Blush Music in extended versions.

== Personnel ==
- David Eugene Edwards
- Daniel McMahon
- Stephen Taylor
