= Folklore (16 Horsepower album) =

Studio album by 16 Horsepower
- Released: June 17, 2002
- Studio: Absinthe, Denver
- Genre: Folk; gothic country
- Length: 37:17
- Label: Glitterhouse; Jetset

16 Horsepower chronology
Hoarse (2000)	Folklore (2002)	Olden (2003)

Professional ratings
Review scores
Source	Rating
AllMusic	4.5/5 stars
Pitchfork Media	7.9/10

Folklore is the fourth and final studio album by 16 Horsepower. It was released in 2002 on Glitterhouse Records in Europe and on Jetset Records in USA.

As indicated by its name, most of the material on Folklore is drawn from traditional folk music. Only four songs ("Hutterite Mile," "Blessed Persistence," "Beyond the Pale" and "Flutter") are original compositions. Like Secret South, this album was produced by the band (reduced to the core trio of David Eugene Edwards, Pascal Humbert and Jean-Yves Tola) and engineered by Bob Ferbrache. According to Ferbrache, the album was written, recorded, mixed and mastered in 21 days, on a budget of just $5,000.

== Track listing ==
All tracks are written by 16 Horsepower and David Eugene Edwards except where noted.

No.	Title	Writer(s)	Length
1.	"Hutterite Mile"		4:04
2.	"Outlaw Song"	Traditional	4:29
3.	"Blessed Persistence"		4:06
4.	"Alone and Forsaken"	Hank Williams	2:49
5.	"Single Girl"	The Carter Family	2:35
6.	"Beyond the Pale"		3:45
7.	"Horse Head Fiddle"	Traditional	4:50
8.	"Sinnerman"	Traditional	4:15
9.	"Flutter"		4:04
10.	"La Robe a Parasol"	Traditional	2:14

== Personnel ==
16 Horsepower

- David Eugene Edwards
- Pascal Humbert
- Jean-Yves Tola

Technical

- 16 Horsepower – production
- Bob Ferbrache – engineering, mixing, mastering

== Charts ==
Chart (2002)	Peak position
Dutch Albums (Album Top 100)	62
French Albums (SNEP)	147
Belgian Albums (Ultratop Wallonia)	50
Swedish Albums (Sverigetopplistan)	36
