= Lilium (band) =

French-American band

- Origin: Paris, France
- Genres: Alternative country; indie rock; folk
- Years active: 1984–present
- Labels: Glitterhouse; Smooch
- Members: Pascal Humbert; Bruno Green
- Past members: Jean-Yves Tola; Kal Cahoone

Lilium is a musical project begun by French musician Pascal Humbert, a member of the groups 16 Horsepower and Wovenhand. Lilium is a two-piece augmented by frequent guests based in Denver, Colorado, USA.

== History ==
The project began in 1984, centered on home recordings and informal studio projects by Humbert, mostly solo. Humbert lived in Paris at the time and played bass guitar in his long-running art rock group Passion Fodder.

Relocated to Los Angeles, California, in 1992, Humbert rejoined with drummer Jean-Yves Tola (also of Passion Fodder) and American singer-songwriter David Eugene Edwards to form 16 Horsepower. The trio would later move to Denver. Humbert continued to record material that would later comprise Lilium's first album. In 2000 Humbert finished the first Lilium record, Transmission of All the Goodbyes, which was released on the German Glitterhouse Records label. The material was almost entirely instrumental, composed of dark, often sparse rock experiments.

Shortly thereafter, Lilium evolved into a studio-based collaborative project between Humbert and Tola. The second Lilium record, 2003's Short Stories, found the duo composing and performing music with guest musicians, singers and lyricists, including Edwards, John Grant, Kal Cahoone, Daniel McMahon, Jim Kalin, and Dana Colley and Billy Conway of Morphine. The material on the album reflected the pair's interest in American folk musics as well as their European musical heritage.

16 Horsepower disbanded in 2005. Following this, Lilium expanded into a full band with the addition of Bruno Green and singer Cahoone. Humbert joined Edwards' project Woven Hand in 2007.

In 2009, Lilium finished their third record, Felt. The band returned to a two-piece, now featuring Humbert and Green – Tola had ceased involvement with the group, and Cahoone contributed as a guest member, along with Hugo Race and a cast of others.

== Members ==
=== Current members ===
- Pascal Humbert – bass guitar, guitar, keyboards, percussions (1984–present)
- Bruno Green – guitar, programming, electronics, percussions (2005–present)

=== Former members ===
- Jean-Yves Tola – drums, keyboards, percussion (2000–2008)
- Kal Cahoone – vocals (2005–2008; as guest, 2003–2005, 2008–present)

== Discography ==
- Transmission of All the Goodbyes (2000, Glitterhouse Records)
- Short Stories (2003, Smooch Records)
- Felt (2010, Glitterhouse Records)
