= David Eugene Edwards =

American musician

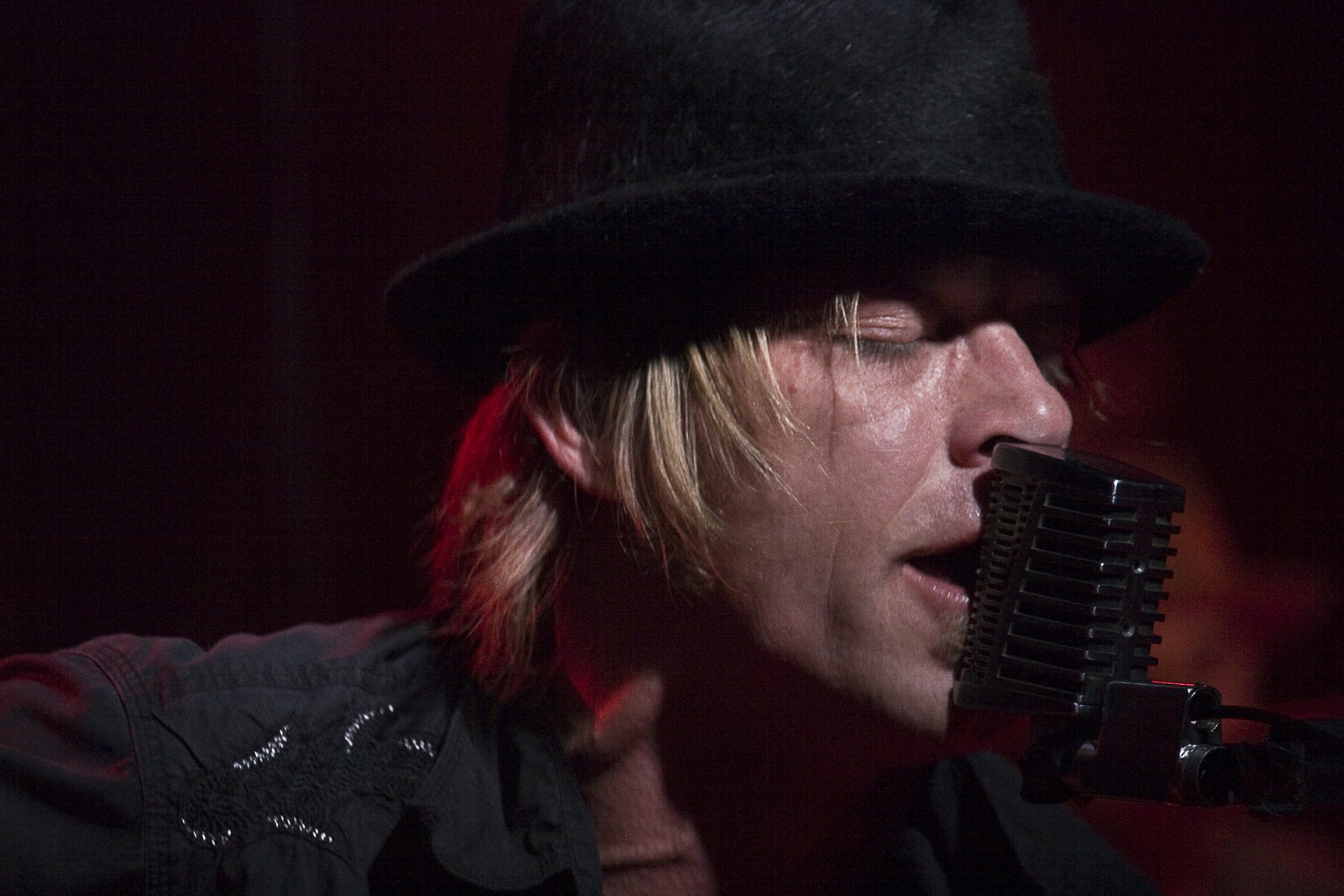
- Edwards performing with Wovenhand in 2010
- Born: February 24, 1968 (age 58); Englewood, Colorado, U.S.
- Occupations: Singer; songwriter; musician
- Years active: 1992–present
- Spouse: Leah Edwards
- Children: 2
- Musical career
- Genres: Alternative rock; country rock; gothic country; folk rock
- Instruments: Vocals; guitar; banjo; hurdy gurdy; lap steel; keyboards; concertina
- Member of: Wovenhand
- Formerly of: 16 Horsepower; Crime & the City Solution

David Eugene Edwards (born February 24, 1968) is an American musician. He is the frontperson for 16 Horsepower (formed in 1992), Wovenhand (formed in 2001), and his solo project. Their music contains elements of old-time, folk, punk, medieval, gypsy, Native American music, and most recently late 1980s and early 1990s gothic rock. Lyrically, it deals with pain, conflict, faith, and redemption, with Edwards's Christian beliefs influencing much of the lyrical imagery.

== Early life ==
Edwards was born in 1968 in Englewood, Colorado, the grandson of a traveling Church of the Nazarene preacher. He grew up in the church and often traveled with his grandfather. The music of the church became a major influence on the music he produced as an adult.

His family later attended a Baptist church. Through these experiences, he developed an early and intensely personal relationship with Christianity.

Edwards worked in a variety of jobs before becoming a full-time musician, including ditch digger, dishwasher, carpenter and janitor. He did not finish high school.

== Career ==
Edwards, along with Jean-Yves Tola and Pascal Humbert (together as 16 Horsepower) performed on the soundtrack to the Jim White-inspired film Searching for the Wrong-Eyed Jesus, playing the traditional "Wayfarin' Stranger." He also appears in the film, playing a fragment of "Phyllis Ruth," a 16 Horsepower song from 1997's Low Estate.

In 2012, he became a member of Crime & the City Solution. In 2018, Edwards and co-member Alexander Hacke released an album called Risha.

In 2020, Edwards collaborated with Carpenter Brut, a French synthwave artist. They created a song and video called Fab Tool, to which Edwards contributed lyrically as well as vocally.

In August 2023, Edwards announced his first album as a solo artist, titled Hyacinth, produced by Chelsea Wolfe backing band musician Ben Chisholm. The album was released on September 29, 2023, with the first single "Lionisis" having been released on August 3, alongside a music video.

In April 2026, Edwards announced his second album as a solo artist, titled Mercurial Silence, to be released May 22, 2026.

== Faith ==
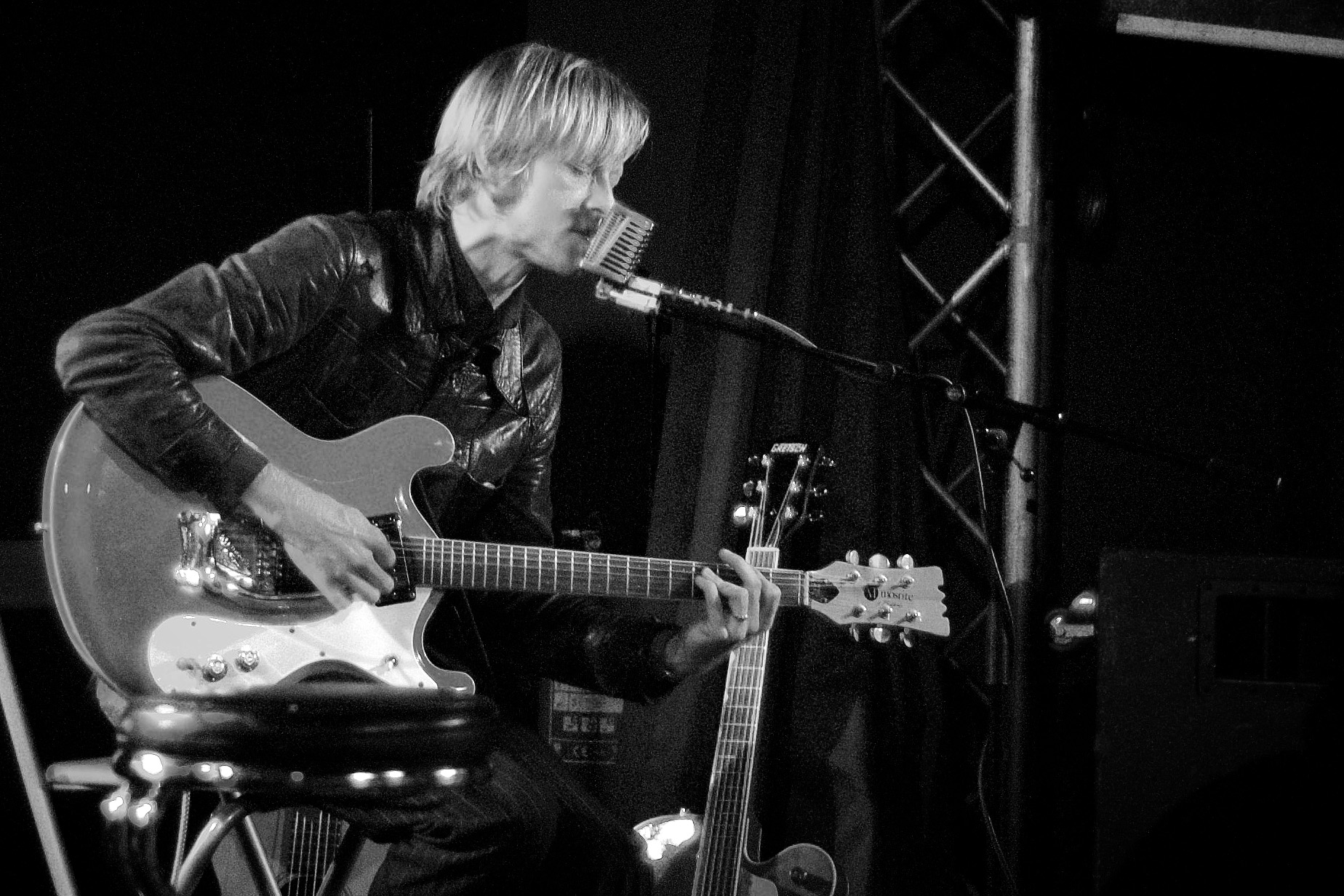
Edwards performing solo in 2004

Edwards remains deeply Christian, and occasionally talks to the press about his faith and its relationship to his music. “Religion is kind of a weird word today … you know I grew up in the Church. My Grandfather was the preacher of the Church that I went to. It was small and he led the music. Socially, that was a major part of my life. There are a lot of people that grow up in the Church or whatever and they don’t care about it or they don’t follow it. Just because your parents believe doesn’t mean you are going to. But I have always believed in it, in the Bible, and it’s a huge part of my life, it affects everything I do. There is no separation between it and my regular life … you know what I mean … That’s what I sing about," he told Issue.

Despite the Christian themes that run through Edwards' music with 16 Horsepower and Wovenhand, he says Christian music communities have never embraced his work—and neither has the secular music world. “The Christian community has never liked my music, and the secular world has never accepted it because it has a Christian bent to it. So neither camp wants it. There’s nothing I can do about it. It’s just what I do. I’m not gonna try to appease either side.”

== Personal life ==
Edwards is married; his wife's name is Leah. He has two children.

== Discography ==
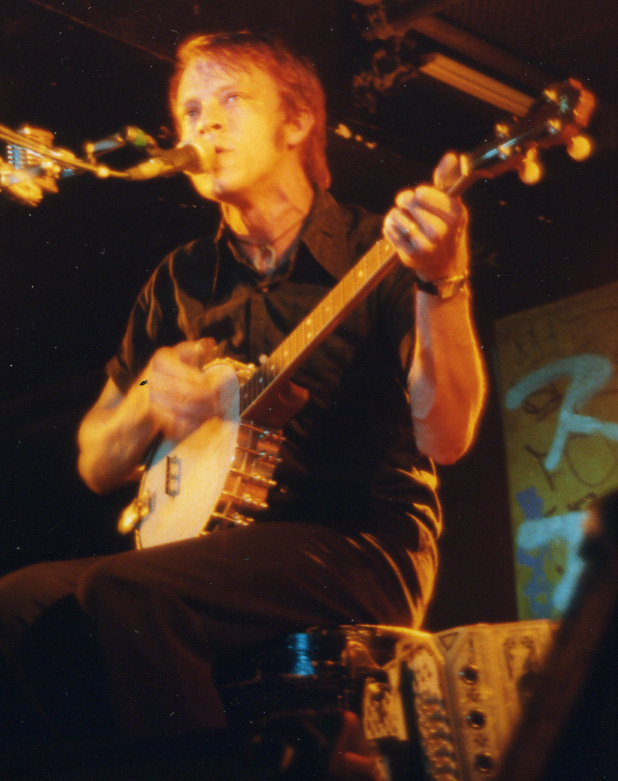
Edwards of 16 Horsepower in 1998

=== Albums ===
- With 16 Horsepower:
  - Horsepower EP (CD/vinyl - 1995)
  - Sackcloth 'n' Ashes (CD - 1995 / Vinyl - 2012 reissue)
  - Low Estate (CD - 1997 / Vinyl - 2013 reissue)
  - Secret South (CD/vinyl - 2000)
  - Hoarse (CD - 2000 / Vinyl - 2014 reissue)
  - Folklore (CD/vinyl - 2002)
  - Olden (CD/vinyl - 2003)
- With Wovenhand:
  - Woven Hand (2002)
  - Blush Music (2003)
  - Blush (Original Score) (2003)
  - Consider the Birds (2004)
  - Mosaic (2006)
  - Puur (2006)
  - Ten Stones (2008)
  - The Threshingfloor (2010)
  - Live at Roepaen (2012)
  - The Laughing Stalk (2012)
  - Refractory Obdurate (2014)
  - Star Treatment (2016)
  - Silver Sash (2022)
- With Alexander Hacke:
  - Risha (2018)
- As a solo act:
  - Hyacinth (2023)
  - Mercurial Silence (2026)

=== Singles ===
- 16 Horsepower:
  - "Shametown" (vinyl 7" - 1994)
  - "Black Soul Choir" (CD - 1996)
  - "Haw" (vinyl - 1996)
  - "For Heaven's Sake" (CD - 1997)
  - "Coal Black Horses" (CD - 1997)
  - "The Partisan" (CD - 1998)
  - "Clogger" (CD - 2000)
  - "Splinters" (CD - 2001)

=== Video ===
- 16 Horsepower/Wovenhand
  - Black Soul Choir and Haw (1995)
  - 16HP DVD (2005)
  - Live DVD (2006)
  - Live at Roepaen DVD+CD (2012)
