= Consider the Birds =

Studio album by Woven Hand
- Released: September 27, 2004 (UK); November 2, 2004 (US)
- Length: 41:32
- Label: Glitterhouse Records (UK); Sounds Familyre (US); Burnt Toast (vinyl release)
- Producer: David Eugene Edwards

Woven Hand chronology
Blush (2003)	Consider the Birds (2004)	Mosaic (2006)

Professional ratings
Review scores
Source	Rating
Allmusic	4/5 stars
CD Times	(?)
Pitchfork Media	(8.5/10)
Pop Matters	(?)
Uncut	4/5 stars

Consider the Birds is the second album (not counting the score for Blush) by David Eugene Edwards' Woven Hand. The album's title comes from the Sermon on the Mount. When asked why he chose this as his album's title, David Eugene Edwards replied, "I wanted to remind myself of the birds. I am often anxious. I need to fall on my faith more."

== Track listing ==
All tracks by David Eugene Edwards except where noted

1. "Sparrow Falls" – 4:45
2. "Bleary Eyed Duty" – 4:30
3. "To Make a Ring" – 4:33
4. "Off the Cuff" – 3:31
5. "Chest of Drawers" – 3:53
6. "Oil on Panel" – 5:36
7. "The Speaking Hands" – 4:00
8. "Down in Yon Forest" (Traditional) – 3:08
9. "Tin Finger" – 3:54
10. "Into the Piano" – 3:38

The Burnt Toast vinyl release has the same track listing. Tracks 1–5 appear on Side A and tracks 6–10 appear on Side B. The Speaking Hands was also featured on the Paste Magazine sampler CD #13.

A cover version of "Oil on Panel" can be found on the "Souls for Belial" EP (2012) by the Swedish Black Metal band Marduk.

== Personnel ==
- David Eugene Edwards
- Daniel McMahon – piano
- Ordy Garrison – drums
- Shane Trost – bass

== Cover and title ==
The album art was done by Gina Fallico, a longtime friend of David Eugene Edwards.

The title, Consider the Birds, refers to a passage from the Bible, consisting of three verses in the 6th chapter of the Book of Matthew- verses 25-27(ESV):

- "Therefore I tell you, do not be anxious about your life, what you will eat or what you will drink, nor about your body, what you will put on. Is not life more than food, and the body more than clothing?" (Matt 6:25)
- "Look at the birds of the air: they neither sow nor reap nor gather into barns, and yet your heavenly Father feeds them. Are you not of more value than they?" (Matt 6:26)
- "And which of you by being anxious can add a single hour to his span of life?" (Matt:6:27)
