= Obdurate =

Obdurate may refer to:

- HMS Obdurate (G39), a O-class destroyer of the Royal Navy
- HMS Obdurate (1916), an Admiralty M-class destroyer that was in operation from 1916 to 1921
- Obdurate Ltd., publisher of music magazine Zero Tolerance

== See also ==
- Refractory Obdurate, 2014 album by American rock band Wovenhand
- Obturation (verb form: obturate), necessary blockage or fitment of a firearm's barrel by a deformed soft projectile
