= Alone and Forsaken =

1951 song by Hank Williams

Single by Hank Williams
- A-side: "A Teardrop on a Rose"
- Published: December 5, 1951 Acuff-Rose Publications, Inc.
- Released: July 1955 (MGM 12029)
- Recorded: August 1948 – May 1949 (Shreveport, Louisiana)
- Genre: Country, folk
- Length: 2:02
- Label: MGM Records
- Songwriter: Hank Williams

"Alone and Forsaken" is a country song written and demoed (though never officially released at the time) by American musician Hank Williams. It has been since covered by many artists.

== Background ==
Williams' recording of the song was taken from one of his performances on the Shreveport radio station KWKH between August 1948 and May 1949. MGM released it in 1955, over two years after Williams' death. The song features only Williams' vocals and acoustic guitar. It explores themes of loneliness and desolation, which he had written about on previous ballads like "I'm So Lonesome I Could Cry"; unlike this song, "Alone and Forsaken" is set in A minor and features a sparse quality that gives it a darker feel.

"Alone and Forsaken" is one of the few songs that Williams ever wrote and sang that sounds more like a folk song than a country song. In the half-spoken verses, Williams reflects upon meeting his love, when "the pastures were green and the meadows were gold", but "her love, like the leaves, now have withered and gone". The darkening imagery gives way to a desperate plea during the chorus:

Alone and forsaken by fate and by man
Oh Lord, if you hear me, please hold to my hand, oh please understand

== Cover versions ==
- The first issued version of the song was by Bill Darnell, who recorded it on January 16, 1952.
- Pianist Floyd Cramer recorded an instrumental version in 1962 on RCA.
- Chet Atkins (who played guitar on several of Williams' recordings) recorded it for his 1965 album More of That Guitar Country.
- A previously unissued version, recorded by Williams' son in 1974, appears on the 1992 box set Living Proof: The MGM Recordings 1963-1975.
- Tony Rice recorded it on his 1975 LP California Autumn.
- The Mekons issued the song as the B-side to their 1986 single "Hello Cruel World".
- Townes Van Zandt performed the song on the 1996 album In Pain.
- Neko Case included a version on her 2001 EP Canadian Amp.
- The album is featured on the 2001 tribute album Timeless: Hank Williams Tribute as a duet by Mark Knopfler and Emmylou Harris.
- 16 Horsepower covered the song on their 2002 album Folklore.
- Tim O'Brien and Darrell Scott covered the song for their 2013 album Memories and Moments.
- Dave Matthews and Neil Young covered it on Hope for Haiti Now, the fund-raising album produced in 2010 to benefit the victims of the Haiti earthquake.
- The song appears on the 2011 Social Distortion album Hard Times and Nursery Rhymes.
- Josh Turner recorded it on his 2020 album Country State of Mind.
- Cleef (doom metal band) recorded it on their 2024 EP The Stray Battalion.

== In popular culture ==
During a cutscene in the 2013 video game The Last of Us, the song is on a cassette tape given to Joel by Ellie while the two are driving. It was later used in the first full trailer and in the fourth episode for the television adaptation of The Last of Us in September 2022.

== Bibliography ==
- Escott, Colin (2004). Hank Williams: The Biography. Back Bay. ISBN 0-316-73497-7.
