= Low Estate =

Studio album by 16 Horsepower
- Released: 1997
- Recorded: Dockside Studios, Lafayette, Louisiana
- Genres: Country rock; neo-gothic
- Length: 50:09
- Label: A&M
- Producer: John Parish

16 Horsepower chronology
Sackcloth 'n' Ashes (1996)	Low Estate (1997)	Secret South (2000)

Professional ratings
Review scores
Source	Rating
Allmusic	4/5 stars
The Phantom Tollbooth	
NME	7/10 stars

Low Estate is the second full-length album by 16 Horsepower. Produced by John Parish and released in 1997, only a year after Sackcloth 'n' Ashes, it drew heavily upon compositions pre-dating the band's first album. Original bassist Pascal Humbert rejoined the band prior to the recording. It is their only studio album to feature Jeffrey-Paul Norlander (of The Denver Gentlemen, pre-16 Horsepower band formed in 1988 by him and David Eugene Edwards).

== Track listing ==
=== US version ===
All lyrics are written by David Eugene Edwards, except where noted; all music is composed by 16 Horsepower, except where noted.

No.	Title	Lyrics	Length
1.	"Brimstone Rock"		4:29
2.	"My Narrow Mind"		2:59
3.	"Low Estate"		4:10
4.	"For Heaven's Sake"		4:54
5.	"Sac of Religion"	David Eugene Edwards, Jeffrey-Paul Norlander	3:28
6.	"The Denver Grab"	Edwards, Norlander	5:03
7.	"Ditch Digger"		3:22
8.	"Pure Clob Road"		3:43
9.	"Phyllis Ruth"		4:36
10.	"Black Lung"		2:26
11.	"Dead Run"		3:20
12.	"Golden Rope"		4:15
13.	"Hang My Teeth on Your Door"	Norlander	2:36

=== European version ===
The 1997 European release replaced "Ditch Digger" with a re-recording of "Coal Black Horses", originally featured on the 16 Horsepower EP.

No.	Title	Lyrics	Length
1.	"Brimstone Rock"		4:29
2.	"My Narrow Mind"		2:59
3.	"Low Estate"		4:10
4.	"For Heaven's Sake"		4:54
5.	"Sac of Religion"	Edwards, Norlander	3:28
6.	"The Denver Grab"	Edwards, Norlander	5:03
7.	"Coal Black Horses"		3:54
8.	"Pure Clob Road"		3:43
9.	"Phyllis Ruth"		4:36
10.	"Black Lung"		2:26
11.	"Dead Run"		3:20
12.	"Golden Rope"		4:15
13.	"Hang My Teeth on Your Door"	Norlander	2:36

=== 1998 European reissue ===
The 1998 European version omits "Dead Run" but adds "Ditch Digger" and two additional cover songs, both recorded in collaboration with French singer Bertrand Cantat of Noir Désir: "Fire Spirit" (by The Gun Club) and "The Partisan" (by Anna Marly).

No.	Title	Lyrics	Music	Length
1.	"Brimstone Rock"			4:29
2.	"My Narrow Mind"			2:59
3.	"Low Estate"			4:10
4.	"For Heaven's Sake"			4:54
5.	"Sac of Religion"	Edwards, Norlander		3:28
6.	"The Denver Grab"	Edwards, Norlander		5:03
7.	"Coal Black Horses"			3:54
8.	"Pure Clob Road"			3:43
9.	"Phyllis Ruth"			4:36
10.	"Black Lung"			2:26
11.	"Fire Spirit"	Jeffrey Lee Pierce	Jeffrey Lee Pierce	2:57
12.	"Golden Rope"			4:15
13.	"Hang My Teeth on Your Door"	Norlander		2:36
14.	"Ditch Digger"			3:21
15.	"The Partisan"	Hy Zaret	Anna Marly	4:14

== Charts ==
Chart (1997)	Peak position
Dutch Albums (Album Top 100)	93

== Personnel ==
16 Horsepower

- David Eugene Edwards – vocals, banjo, guitar, hurdy-gurdy, concertina
- Jeffrey-Paul Norlander – backup vocals, fiddle, cello, organ (credited as "Jeffrey-Paul")
- Jean-Yves Tola – drums, percussion, piano
- Pascal Humbert – bass guitar, bass fiddle, guitar

Additional musicians

- John Parish – additional percussion, organ, guitar, xylophone
- Steve Taylor – guitar on "Phyllis Ruth"
- Bertrand Cantat – vocals, guitar and harmonica on "Fire Spirit" and "The Partisan"
- Shane Hotle – piano on "The Partisan"

Technical

- John Parish – production, mixing on "Hang My Teeth on Your Door"
- Jeff Powell – engineering
- Phil Nicolo – mixing, engineering on "Fire Spirit" and "The Partisan"
- Shane Hotle and 16 Horsepower - production and mixing on "Fire Spirit" and "The Partisan"
- Bob Ludwig – mastering
- Sunja Park – art direction, design
- Ken Schles – photography
