= Down in Yon Forest =

Traditional English Christmas carol

"Down in Yon Forest" (or "Down in Yon Forrest"), also known as "All Bells in Paradise" and "Castleton Carol", is a traditional English Christmas carol dating to the Renaissance era, ultimately deriving from the anonymous Middle English poem known today as the Corpus Christi Carol. The song was originally associated with Good Friday or the Corpus Christi Feast rather than Christmas, but some more recent variants have additional verses which reference Christmas. It is listed in the Roud Folk Song Index as number 1523.

Multiple audio recordings have been made of the song, particularly in the town of Castleton, Derbyshire, England, where the famous composer and folk song collector Ralph Vaughan Williams encountered and transcribed a version sung by a Mr. J Hall in 1908. Like many English folk songs, it seems to have naturally made its way to the United States, where several traditional singers including Jean Ritchie have been recorded singing the song.

The carol appears as number 61 in The Oxford Book of Carols, and has been arranged in modern English by Ralph Vaughan Williams, Nicholas Maw, John Jacob Niles and John Rutter, among others. It has been recorded by artists including Kate Rusby (called Paradise on Angels and Men), Joan Baez (on Noël), Martyn Bates with Max Eastley, The English Singers, Shirley Collins, The Albion Band, Bruce Cockburn (on Christmas), Kemper Crabb, Burl Ives (on Christmas Day in the Morning), John McCutcheon, Jean Ritchie (on Carols for All Seasons), Joglaresa (on In Hoary Winter's Night), Stick in the Wheel, Bob Rowe, Andreas Scholl, Steeleye Span (on Winter), Show of Hands (on Folk Music), Wovenhand (on Consider the Birds), Mark Lanegan, and the choir of Clare College, Cambridge. Oli Steadman included it on his song collection "365 Days Of Folk".

== Lyrics ==
Down in yon forest there stands a hall:
The bells of Paradise I heard them ring:
It's covered all over with purple and pall
And I love my Lord Jesus above anything.

In that hall there stands a bed:
The bells of Paradise I heard them ring:
It's covered all over with scarlet so red:
And I love my Lord Jesus above anything.

At the bed-side there lies a stone:
The bells of Paradise I heard them ring:
Which the sweet Virgin Mary knelt upon:
And I love my Lord Jesus above anything.

Under that bed there runs a flood:
The bells of Paradise I heard them ring:
The one half runs water, the other runs blood:
And I love my Lord Jesus above anything.

At the bed's foot there grows a thorn:
The bells of Paradise I heard them ring:
Which ever blows blossom since he was born:
And I love my Lord Jesus above anything.

Over that bed the moon shines bright:
The bells of Paradise I heard them ring:
Denoting our Saviour was born this night:
And I love my Lord Jesus above anything.

== See also ==
- List of Christmas carols
