= Hobotalk =

Scottish alternative rock band

Hobotalk were a Scottish alternative rock band, playing the songs of the singer-songwriter Marc Pilley.

Having started as a drummer, Pilley started songwriting in 1989. Together with guitar-player Ross Edmond, Al Denholm (bass) and Iain Bruce (drums), he founded Hobotalk in the late 1990s. In 1998, Hobotalk signed to Hut Records. Their debut EP Pictures of Romance was released in November 1999. Both the EP and the following Scotland tour (supporting the indie rock band Gomez) received positive critical response for their heartfelt sound rooted in American-style folk.

Hobotalk's debut album Beauty in Madness was released in 2000 and also widely received with critical acclaim being shortlisted for the Mercury Prize. Despite all this, the album had only little sales and was hardly noticed by a wider public.

In 2002, the band split from Hut Records. It was not until 2005 that a second album was released. Notes on Sunset appeared on Circular Records (UK) and Glitterhouse Records (Europe). Again, the album gained positive reviews, but did not form a commercial breakthrough for the band.

The band's line up by now was Pilley, Ali Petrie (keys), Klive Smith (guitar), Allan Cranston (drums), Nick Houldsworth (guitar, mandolin).

In 2007, Hobotalk's the album Homesick for Nowhere was released.

Alone Again Or saw Hobotalk's final album release in 2008.

== Influences ==
Major influences of Hobotalks's music are Tim Buckley, Tim Hardin and Joni Mitchell.

== Discography ==
- 2008 Alone Again Or
- 2007 Homesick for Nowhere
- 2005 Notes on Sunset
- 2004 A Chair by the Window (unofficial release only available on concerts)
- 2000 Beauty in Madness
- 1999 Pictures of Romance (EP)
