= Ben Zabo =

Malian musician

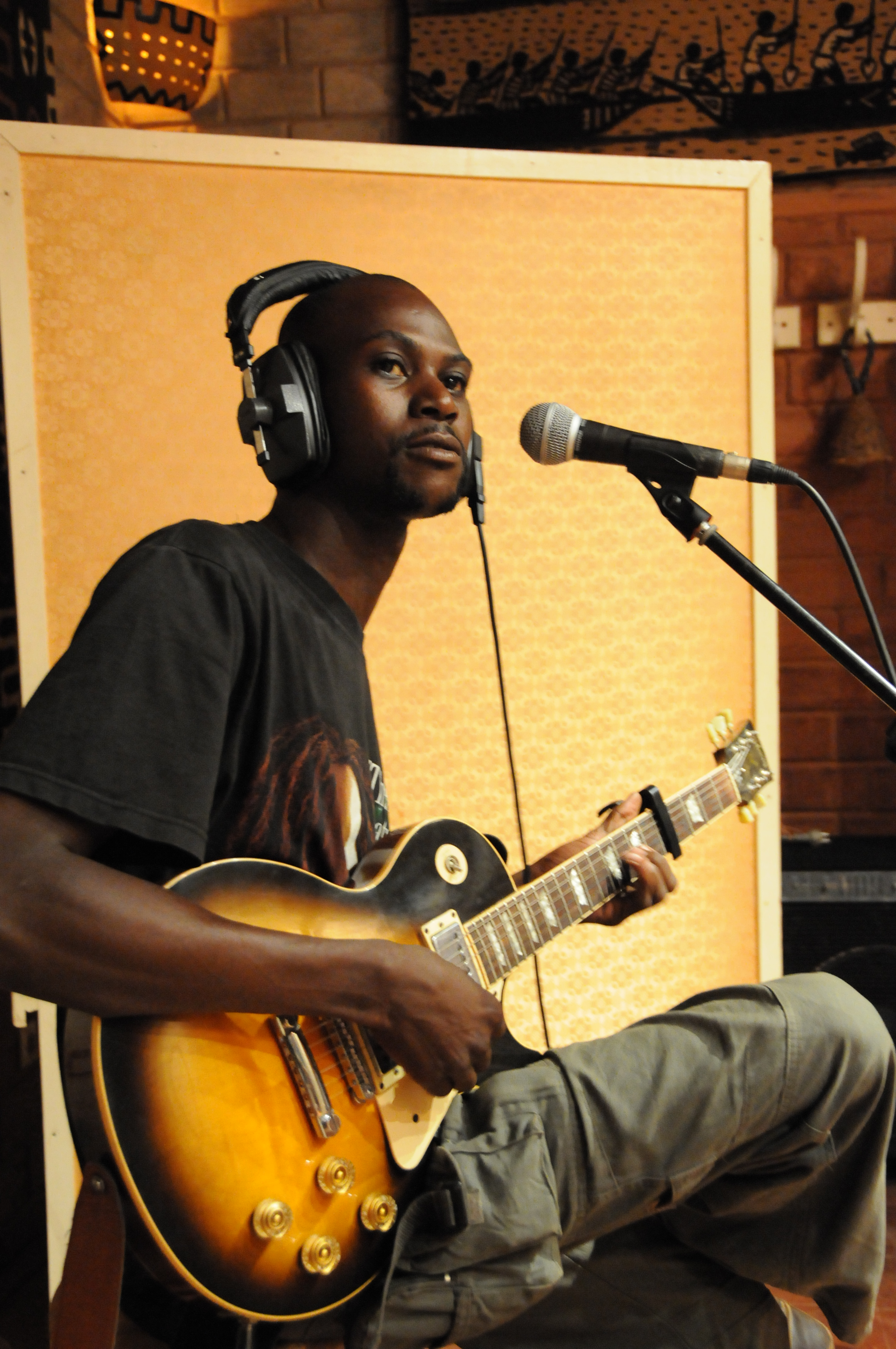
- Ben Zabo in the studio (2011)

Background information
- Born: Arouna Moussa Coulibaly; January 24, 1979 (age 46); Ségou Region, Mali
- Years active: 2006–present
- Labels: Glitterhouse
- Website: hcmf.de/benzabo/

Ben Zabo (born Arouna Moussa Coulibaly, January 24, 1979) is a Malian Afrobeat-musician from Bamako. He was born at Tominian in the Ségou Region. He released his self-titled debut album on the international record company Glitterhouse Records in 2012.

== History ==
Ben Zabo was born at Tominian in the Segou region, where he spent his childhood. Born into nobility, as a member of the Bwa tribe he came to music because of his passion but against the advice of his parents who wanted him to choose a career as a pharmacist. It was around the age of 14 he began studying music with Francois Koita, conductor of "Bwa Band" (the orchestra Tominian). This apprenticeship lasted until the end of his high school in 1999 in Sikasso.

Arriving in Bamako for his graduate studies in pharmacology, he joined the group "Coumba" of Binke in 2000. He toured for two years and continued to develop his talent and his experience playing in several groups in Bamako. From 2006, with a view to a professional music career, Ben Zabo studied music at the Conservatoire des Arts et Métiers Multimédia Bamako for five years and graduated in advanced studies.

Beyond his talents as a guitar player and singer, he specialized in the field of sound techniques, allowing him to be an assistant sound engineer at the studio Bogolan in Bamako (Tamikrest, Ali Farka Touré, Salif Keita, Vieux Farka Touré) since 2007. It was in this studio that he met European label-owner, Peter Weber (Glitterhouse Records) who agreed to record and distribute Ben Zabo's album for the international market. Ben Zabos self-titled debut album was produced by Chris Eckman (Dirtmusic, The Walkabouts)and released by Glitterhouse Records in 2012.

== Discography ==
- 2012: Ben Zabo (Glitterhouse Records)
- 2013: Mark Ernestus Meets Ben Zabo – Wari Wo / Dana Dubwise (Glitterbeat Records)

== Awards ==
- 2010: Band of the Year – Bamako
