= The White Birch (band) =

- Origin: Oslo, Norway
- Genres: Slowcore, post-rock, dream pop
- Years active: 1996–present
- Label: Glitterhouse
- Members: Ola Fløttum
- Past members: Hans Christian Almendingen; Ulf Rogde

The White Birch is a Norwegian slowcore project of Ola Fløttum. Previously a trio composed of Ola Fløttum, Hans Christian Almendingen, and Ulf Rogde, the band released three studio albums and then broke up after the band played their last show in 2006. Ola Fløttum has worked by composing film scores, but in 2014 he released the single Lantern through the project and in 2015 he released the full album, "The Weight of Spring".

The name comes from the 1994 album "The White Birch" by the band Codeine, one of the cornerstones of slowcore. They are sometimes called the "Norwegian Sigur Rós." According to Ola, the project differenciates from his other band, Salvatore, for being more personal. Their first album was "the combination of calm and intense" music, but from "People Now Human Beings" on, it has taken a more elaborated and calmer tone, with elements borrowed from music made with his pen name "The Portrait of David".

== Discography ==
- "Self-Portrayal" (1996, limited edition of 300 copies on vinyl)
- "Left Hand EP" (1997, a limited edition EP of 200 copies)
- "People Now Human Beings" (1998)
- "Star Is Just A Sun" (2002) allmusic review
- "Come Up For Air" (2005) allmusic review
- "The Weight Of Spring" (2015)
