= The Shivers (1990s band) =

American alt-country band

- Origin: Portland, Oregon; Minneapolis, Minnesota, U.S.
- Genres: Alternative country
- Years active: 1988—1998
- Labels: Restless Records (US); Glitterhouse (Europe)
- Past members: Carey Kemper; Kelly Bell; Barry Haney; Christopher Wolff; Diesel Tucker
- Website: soundcloud.com/kellybell/sets/shivers101

The Shivers were an American alternative country group. They were formed in 1989 in Austin, Texas by founding members Carey Kemper and Kelly Bell, and released two albums internationally on Restless Records (US) and Glitterhouse Records (Europe) in 1994 and 1996. Though originally from Austin, they were primarily based alternately out of Portland, Oregon and Minneapolis, Minnesota. The band applied for and was granted copyright status for the brand (™) The Shivers in 1994.

The Shivers were very favorably reviewed for their work in Rolling Stone in both the United States and in Europe. Their first record, The Shivers, was released in 1994 to widespread positive response both in the US and the UK, and their second record, The Buried Life (Restless 72915–2) was released in 1996, where it was praised by the alternative country movement both in the US and Europe. It was named to the Top-10 Best Albums of 1996 by Country Guitar magazine, and New Country, Mojo and Alternative Press also praised it. and others) Both albums were recorded by Tom Herbers at his Third Ear Studios in Minneapolis and at Dead Aunt Thelma's Studio in Portland.

== History ==
The band was an early alt-country groundbreaker, touring widely and continuously in the US for several years, including the SXSW Music Conference three years running (1994–1996, the New Music Seminar (1995), the Northwest Independent Music Conference (1996) and NXNW (1997).

The founding members of the band were Carey Kemper (guitars, songwriter, vocals), Kelly Bell (bass, songwriter, vocals, acoustic guitar) and Barry Haney (drums), and this lineup produced the two above-mentioned records, as well as two earlier recordings, a self-released, self-titled cassette, and a 7" single "Almost Gone" b/w "Love Other Gone", both in 1992.

Founding member Kelly Bell received her bachelor's degree in Linguistics from UT Austin and is the Founder and CTO of Gotham City Drupal, a Drupal CMS development cooperative.

In early 1997, Restless Records dropped the band and The Shivers broke up shortly after playing the first NXNW Conference in October 1997, ending their career by releasing an independent CD titled "v3.5", recorded by Joash Gallagher in Portland.

== Discography ==
=== The Shivers ===
Recording Information about The Shivers CD (Restless UPC:018777277723 )

==== Track listing ====
1. Silver City Train
2. Rivers
3. Almost Gone
4. Never Leave Nevada
5. Love Other Gone
6. When I Fall
7. Good As Things Are
8. Things Change
9. Gentle
10. Red Cats
11. Heart Of Texas Blues
12. Dreamtime With A Wanted Man

==== Details ====
- Producer: The Shivers, Tom Herbers
- Distributor: Ryko Distribution
- Recording type: Studio
- Recording mode: Stereo
- SPAR Code: n/a

==== Album notes ====
The Shivers: Carey Kemper (vocals, guitar, violin), Kelly Bell (vocals, bass, acoustic guitar), Christopher Wolff (drums, percussion).
Additional personnel: Barry Haney, Diesel Tucker (drums).
Recordists: Tom Herbers (tracks 1-2, 4, 6-12); Jason Orris (tracks 3, 5).
All songs written by members of The Shivers except "Never Leave Nevada" and "Gentle" (E. Ann Powell).

== See also ==
- The Shivers (New York City)
