= The Great Crusades =

- Origin: Chicago, Illinois, U.S.
- Genres: Roots rock, heartland rock, blues rock, alt-country, country rock, Americana
- Years active: 1996–present
- Labels: Checkered Past, Glitterhouse, Mud, Trocadero
- Members: Brian Krumm, Brian Hunt, Chris Moder, Brian Leach

The Great Crusades are an American, Chicago, Illinois–based rock band founded in 1996.

== History ==
The Great Crusades began when Brian Krumm and Brian Hunt, both of whom were then students at the University of Illinois Urbana-Champaign, started an art-pop band called the Suede Chain. The band released several albums on the Parasol Records imprint Mud Records before breaking up in 1997. Krumm then started writing new music of a very different style, influenced by such artists as Nick Cave & the Bad Seeds, Tom Waits, and the Replacements, and Uncle Tupelo. The result was the Great Crusades' first album under that name, 1998's The First Spilled Drink of the Evening.

== Reviews ==
PopMatters' Eden Miller gave the Great Crusades' second album, Damaged Goods, a favorable review, writing that "While The Great Crusades aren't doing anything new musically, with the basic rock line-up complimented every now and then with some ska-inspired horns, they don't need to be. The familiarity of their sound makes Damaged Goods easy to enjoy." Greil Marcus wrote that on the band's third album, Never Go Home, the Great Crusades "...carry themselves like Midwestern gangsters: with the determined, bitter nihilism of Tom Hanks in Road to Perdition, but also the gleeful nihilism of Billy Zane in This World, Then the Fireworks." Uncut gave their fourth album, 2004's Welcome to the Hiawatha Inn, a rating of 3 out of 5. The review described the album as an improvement relative to its predecessor, 2002's Never Go Home, which it called "disappointing". It also described the music on Welcome to the Hiawatha Inn as "bulging roadhouse rock, with the added croak of Krumm’s phlegmy Tom Waits-isms."

== Discography ==
- The First Spilled Drink of the Evening (Mud, 1998; reissued by Trocadero in 1999)
- Damaged Goods (Checkered Past/Glitterhouse, 2000)
- Never Go Home (Glitterhouse, 2002)
- Welcome to the Hiawatha Inn (Glitterhouse, 2004)
- Four Thirty (Innocent Words, 2006)
- Keep Them Entertained (Glitterhouse, 2007)
- Who's Afraid of Being Lonely? (Lakeshore, 2011)
- Fiction to Shame (Glitterhouse, 2012)
- Thieves of Chicago (Blue Rose, 2014, Mud Records, 2015)
- Until the Night Turned to Day (Blue Rose, 2017, Mud Records, 2017)
