= Refractory Obdurate =

Studio album by Wovenhand
- Released: April 29, 2014
- Genre: Neofolk
- Length: 42:53
- Label: Glitterhouse/Deathwish
- Producer: Sanford Parker

Wovenhand chronology
The Laughing Stalk (2012)	Refractory Obdurate (2014)	Star Treatment (2016)

Professional ratings
Aggregate scores
Source	Rating
Metacritic	84/100
Review scores
Source	Rating
Allmusic	4/5 stars
Pitchfork	8.2/10.0
PopMatters	7/10

Refractory Obdurate is the seventh studio album by the American rock band Wovenhand. The album was released on April 29, 2014 through a partnership between Glitterhouse Records and Deathwish Inc.

The album was met with generally favorable reviews, and ranked at number 47 on Billboard Top Heatseekers chart.

== Track listing ==
All songs written by David Eugene Edwards, except where noted.

1. "Corsicana Clip" – 4:47
2. "Masonic Youth" – 3:39
3. "The Refractory" – 4:53
4. "Good Shepherd" – 4:00
5. "Salome" – 5:19
6. "King David" – 4:47
7. "Field of Hedon" – 3:33
8. "Obdurate Obscura" (Edwards, Chuck French) – 5:20
9. "Hiss" – 3:53
10. "El-Bow" (Edwards, French, Ordy Garrison, Neil Keener) – 2:42

== Personnel ==
=== Wovenhand ===
- David Eugene Edwards
- Chuck French
- Ordy Garrison
- Neil Keener

=== Production ===
- Collin Jordan – mastering
- Sanford Parker – engineer, mixing

=== Artwork ===
- Jacob Bannon – design
- Neil Keener – artwork
