= Carols of All Seasons =

Studio album by Jean Ritchie
- Released: 1959
- Genre: Folk, Christmas
- Length: 36:30
- Label: Tradition

Professional ratings
Review scores
Source	Rating
AllMusic	3/5 stars

Carols of All Seasons is a 1959 studio album by American folk singer Jean Ritchie.

It was recorded with two classical musicians, which is not unusual for the late 1950s. The sound anticipates the slightly baroque arrangements that Shirley Collins would later use on Anthems in Eden. As well as some often heard carols, there are some rare ones ("Dame Get up and Bake Your Pies") and four unique ones - carols that Jean had learned while she was a child in the Appalachian mountains. In particular "Cherry Tree of Cumberland" has a haunting quality. "The Flower Carol" (Tempus adest floridum) is the song that originally owned the tune "Good King Wenceslas" before Rev J.M. Neale substituted new words in 1853. It is very rarely heard. At the time Jean was the only singer to accompany herself on mountain dulcimer. This can heard on "Children Go Where I Send Thee" and "The May Day Carol".

The album was reissued in 1997 as Carols for All Seasons.

== Track listing ==
All songs trad. except where noted.

1. "The Carnal and the Crane" (instrumental)
2. "I Saw Three Ships"
3. "Dame Get Up and Bake Your Pies"
4. "Children Go Where I Send Thee" (Appalachian carol)
5. "Down in Yon Forest"
6. "Brightest and Best" (Appalachian carol)
7. "Cherry Tree of Cumberlands" (Appalachian carol)
8. "The Pig Went Out to Dig"
9. "Christ Church Bells" (Music: Trad, Lyrics: J. Ritchie)
10. "The Flower Carol" (to the tune "Good King Wenceslas")
11. "The May Day Carol"
12. "The Cambridge May Song"
13. "The Holy Well"
14. "The Little Family" (Appalachian carol)
15. "Christ Was Born in Bethlehem"
16. "The Holly Bears the Berry (Sans Day Carol)"
17. "Wassail Song" (instrumental)

== Personnel ==
- Jean Ritchie – vocals, lap dulcimer
- Robert Abramson – harpsichord
- LaNoue Davenport – recorder
