= Mosaic (Woven Hand album) =

Studio album by Wovenhand
- Released: 2006
- Recorded: Winter 2006, Absinthe, Elktooth, CO
- Length: 45:08
- Label: Glitterhouse Records (UK): Sounds Familyre (US)
- Producer: David Eugene Edwards

Wovenhand chronology
Consider the Birds (2005)	Mosaic (2006)

Professional ratings
Review scores
Source	Rating
AllMusic	4/5 stars
Pitchfork	6.8/10

Mosaic is a studio album by the band Wovenhand. It was released in 2006 on Glitterhouse Records and Sounds Familyre.

== Track listing ==
1. "Breathing Bull"
2. "Winter Shaker"
3. "Swedish Purse"
4. "Twig"
5. "Whistling Girl"
6. "Elktooth"
7. "Bible and Bird"
8. "Dirty Blue"
9. "Slota Prow - Full Armour"
10. "Truly Golden"
11. "Deerskin Doll"
12. "Little Raven"
  "Shun" (hidden track)

== Personnel ==
- David Eugene Edwards – vocals, guitar, bass
- Daniel McMahon – piano
- Ordy Garrison – drums
- Elin Palmer – strings
