= Hoarse (album) =

Live album by 16 Horsepower
- Released: 2000 (Europe), 2001 (North America)
- Recorded: 1998
- Label: Glitterhouse Records 2000, Checkered Past Records 2001, Alternative Tentacles 2006

16 Horsepower chronology
Secret South (2000)	Hoarse (2000)	Folklore (2002)

Hoarse is a live album by the band 16 Horsepower. It was released in Europe in 2000 in digipak with Glitterhouse Records. In March 2001 it was released regularly in jewel case with Glitterhouse. An American version was released in 2001 on Checkered Past records. Another American version was finally re-released on Alternative Tentacles in 2006.

The release is a live album with most of the songs featured recorded at their show on May 5, 1998, at the Bluebird Theatre in Denver, except for "Horse Head" (recorded on March 4, 1998 at the Bluebird) and "Fire Spirit" (recorded at Bataclan, Paris, on October 21, 1998) which features Bertrand Cantat.

On the first edition of the European release, Hoarse had an incorrect track listing. Only ten tracks were listed, whereas there had been eleven; the song "Black Lung" wasn't shown. The track order was also erroneous and the cover of Creedence Clearwater Revival's "Bad Moon Risin'" was incorrectly credited to 16 Horsepower. With the next European release in 2001, the errors were corrected.

== Track listing ==
1. "American Wheeze" (4:11)
2. "Black Soul Choir" (4:31)
3. "Bad Moon Risin'" (John Fogerty) (4:10)
4. "Low Estate" (4:25)
5. "For Heaven's Sake" (4:44)
6. "Black Lung" (4:31)
7. "Horse Head" (5:07)
8. "South Pennsylvania Waltz" (5:45)
9. "Brimstone Rock" (6:47)
10. "Fire Spirit" (Jeffrey Lee Pierce/The Gun Club) (3:21)
11. "Day of The Lords" (Joy Division) (5:01)
