= Secret South =

Studio album by 16 Horsepower
- Released: 2000
- Studio: Hamilton Glory Lodge, Blue River, Colorado
- Length: 42:12
- Label: Glitterhouse
- Producer: 16 Horsepower

16 Horsepower chronology
Low Estate (1997)	Secret South (2000)	Hoarse (2000)

Professional ratings
Aggregate scores
Source	Rating
Metacritic	82/100
Review scores
Source	Rating
AllMusic	4/5 stars
Kerrang!	5/5 stars
NME	9/10
Pitchfork	6.9/10

Secret South is the third studio album by American band 16 Horsepower, released in 2000.

It was the band's first album on German independent label Glitterhouse Records, after their previous label A&M Records got bought up by Universal Records; the album was financed by $50,000 payoff the band received thanks to an option in the contract that they were to be paid if they weren't able to do their third album.

Secret South marked a distinct change in direction compared to previous efforts as it focuses more on storytelling over a more laid-back soundscape. The album was self-produced by the band; according to frontman David Eugene Edwards, A&M previously were skeptical about letting them produce the records themselves, but at that point the band wanted "to make sure that if we had any complaints, they were our fault and nobody else’s. We were pretty confident that we could do it and we were really happy with the outcome". The recording took place in Hamilton Glory Lodge in Colorado mountains and was engineered by Bob Ferbrache, a longtime associate of 16 Horsepower who briefly played organ with them in the early days. Guitarist Steve Taylor, who previously was the band's guitar technician and touring member, became a full member for the album sessions alongside the core trio of Edwards, bassist Pascal Humbert and drummer Jean-Yves Tola. The album includes covers of a traditional song "Wayfaring Stranger" and Bob Dylan's "Nobody 'Cept You"; the latter, although previously recorded by Dylan himself, became the first version ever to be released on a full-length studio album. Tola has later commented that Secret South "was a very successful and true representation of the band at that time [...] We really did what we wanted with almost no compromise".

The song "Clogger" was released as a single, accompanied by a music video, which featured musician Jay Munly and Asher Edwards, daughter of David Eugene Edwards.

"Wayfaring Stranger" has appeared on the soundtracks for 2012 documentary film The Imposter and 2021 film Titane.

== Track listing ==
All tracks are written by David Eugene Edwards and 16 Horsepower, except where noted.

No.	Title	Writer(s)	Length
1.	"Clogger"		3:28
2.	"Wayfaring Stranger"	Traditional	2:42
3.	"Cinder Alley"		4:42
4.	"Burning Bush"		4:00
5.	"Poor Mouth"		4:39
6.	"Silver Saddle"		3:12
7.	"Praying Arm Lane"		3:18
8.	"Splinters"		5:19
9.	"Just Like Birds"		3:44
10.	"Nobody 'Cept You"	Bob Dylan	3:34
11.	"Straw Foot"		3:30

== Charts ==
Chart (2000)	Peak position
Dutch Albums (Album Top 100)	45
Norwegian Albums (VG-lista)	31

== Personnel ==
16 Horsepower

- David Eugene Edwards – vocals, guitar, piano, banjo, concertina
- Steve Taylor – backing vocals, guitar, organ
- Jean-Yves Tola – drums, percussion
- Pascal Humbert – bass, bass fiddle

Guests

- Asher Edwards – strings
- Rebecca Vera – strings
- Elin Palmer – strings

Technical

- 16 Horsepower – production
- Bob Ferbrache – engineering
- Shane Hotle – assistant engineer
- Marty Paul – assistant producer
- Paul Corkett – mixing
- Dan Austin – assistant mixing engineer
- H. J. Mauksch – mastering
- David Zimmer – artwork and photography
