= Olden (album) =

Compilation album by 16 Horsepower
- Released: 2003
- Recorded: at Night Owl Studio, Denver, 1993 (tracks 1–7); at Kerr Macy Studio, Denver, April 1994 (tracks 8–14); live at Mercury Cafe, Denver, October 1994 (15–20)
- Length: 1:03:32
- Label: Glitterhouse/Jet Set Records
- Producer: 16 Horsepower

16 Horsepower chronology
Folklore (2002)	Olden (2003)	Live March 2001 (2008)

Professional ratings
Review scores
Source	Rating
Allmusic	link

Olden is a compilation album by 16 Horsepower, released July 8, 2003. It would be the last record released by 16 Horsepower before their break-up.

The album is divided into three sections, with each section separated by two short interviews with David Eugene Edwards, the band's vocalist and lead musician.

The first seven tracks were recorded at the Night Owl Studio in Denver in 1993, and are referred to as the "Night Owl Studio sessions." The next six songs were recorded at Kerr Macy studio in Denver in 1994. The last six songs are live recordings from their session at the Mercury Cafe in Denver in 1994.

== Track listing ==
All songs by David Eugene Edwards/16 Horsepower, except track 12 by Keven Soll/16 Horsepower.

1. "American Wheeze" – 3:55
2. "Coal Black Horses" – 3:27
3. "Scrawled in Sap" – 2:52
4. "Prison Shoe Romp" – 2:51
5. "I Seen What I Saw" – 2:59
6. "Neck on the New Blade" – 3:08
7. "Interview" – 0:20
8. "South Pennsylvania Waltz" – 4:56
9. "My Narrow Mind" – 4:56
10. "American Wheeze" – 3:40
11. "Shametown" – 2:51
12. "Train Serenade" – 4:20
13. "Strong Man" – 4:36
14. "Interview" – 1:03
15. "Slow Guilt Trot (Live)" – 3:34
16. "Low Estate (Live)" – 3:38
17. "Pure Clob Road (Live)" – 3:01
18. "Heel on the Shovel (Live)" – 2:43
19. "Sac of Religion (Live)" – 3:00
20. "Dead Run (Live)" – 3:10

Mastered: Absinthe Studio, Denver, CO

== Personnel ==
David Eugene Edwards - vocals, bandoneon, guitars, banjo
Keven Soll - acoustic bass guitar, double bass, vocals (on track 12)
Jean-Yves Tola - drums
