= Sackcloth 'n' Ashes =

Studio album by 16 Horsepower
- Released: February 6, 1996
- Studio: Ardent Studios, Memphis, Tennessee
- Genre: Blues; hillbilly; country rock
- Length: 46:18
- Label: A&M
- Producer: Warren Bruleigh

16 Horsepower chronology
16 Horsepower (1995)	Sackcloth 'n' Ashes (1996)	Low Estate (1997)

Professional ratings
Review scores
Source	Rating
AllMusic	4/5 stars
Entertainment Weekly	B−
The Guardian	3/5 stars
Los Angeles Times	3/4 stars
NME	5/10
USA Today	3/4 stars

Sackcloth 'n' Ashes is the debut studio album by American band 16 Horsepower, released on February 6, 1996.

== Track listing ==
1. "I Seen What I Saw" – 3:24
2. "Black Soul Choir" – 3:52
3. "Haw" - 3:24
4. "Scrawled in Sap" – 2:46
5. "Horse Head" – 3:01
6. "Ruthie Lingle" – 2:44
7. "Harm's Way" – 3:20
8. "Black Bush" – 3:16
9. "Heel on the Shovel" – 3:11
10. "American Wheeze" – 3:33
11. "Red Neck Reel" – 2:41
12. "Prison Shoe Romp" – 3:11
13. "Neck on the New Blade" – 3:15
14. "Strong Man" – 4:21

== Personnel ==
16 Horsepower

- David Eugene Edwards – vocals, banjo, guitar, bandoneon, lap steel guitar
- Jean-Yves Tola – drums, backing vocals
- Keven Soll – upright bass, flattop acoustic bass, cello, backing vocals

Guest musicians

- Gordon Gano – fiddle

== Other information ==
- The instrument credited as a bandoneon on this album is actually a similar instrument called a Chemnitzer concertina.
- The album title is a reference to the Holy Bible (see Matthew 11:20-21 RSV and Esther 4:1 RSV).
- The songs "Black Soul Choir" and "Haw" were both later made into music videos, both of which featured the band.
- The song "Black Soul Choir" was covered by American groove metal band Devildriver on their 2011 album Beast.
- The song "Black Soul Choir" was covered by Big John Bates: Noirchestra on their 2015 album From the Bestiary to the Leathering Room.
