= 16 Horsepower =

American country rock band

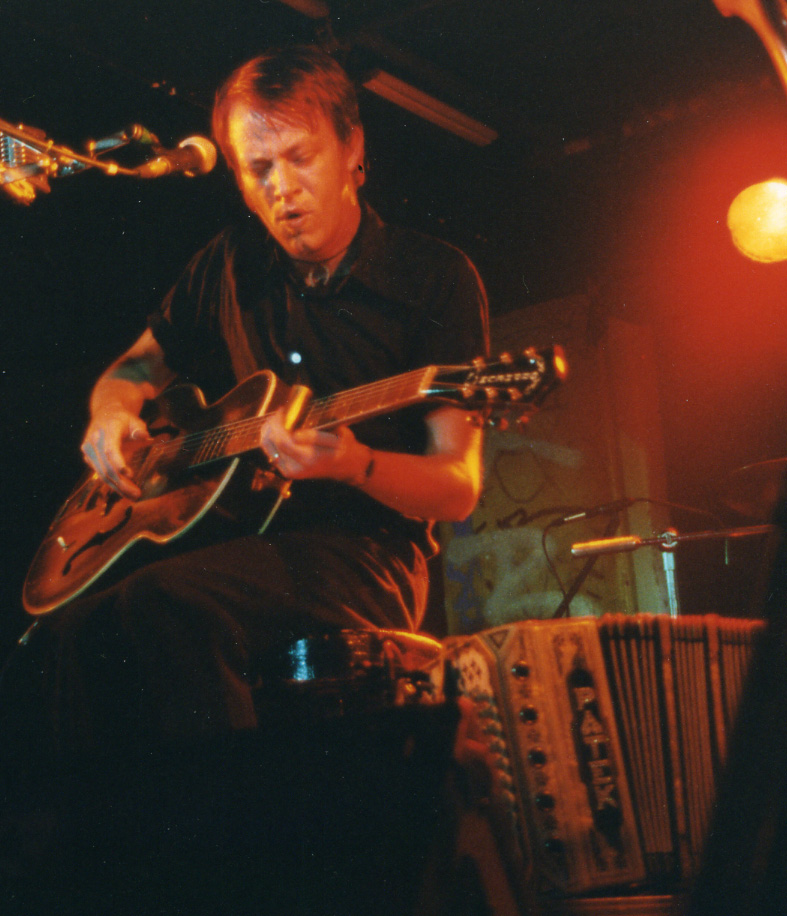
- David Eugene Edwards of 16 Horsepower in 1998

Background information
- Also known as: Horsepower (1992–1993), Sixteen Horsepower, 16 Horse Power, 16Horsepower, 16hp
- Origin: Denver, Colorado, U.S.
- Genres: Gothic country; alternative country; Americana; country rock
- Years active: 1992–2005, 2025–present
- Labels: A&M; Glitterhouse; Razor & Tie; Volkoren; Alternative Tentacles
- Members: David Eugene Edwards; Jean-Yves Tola; Pascal Humbert
- Past members: Keven Soll; Rob Redick; Jeffrey-Paul Norlander; Steve Taylor

16 Horsepower, often stylized as Sixteen Horsepower, is an American country rock band from Denver, Colorado. The group consists of vocalist and multi-instrumentalist David Eugene Edwards, bassist Pascal Humbert and drummer Jean-Yves Tola.

The group pioneered the gothic country genre by mixing country rock with traditional bluegrass, gospel and Appalachian instrumentation. Their music often invoked religious imagery dealing with conflict, redemption, punishment, and guilt through Edwards's lyrics.

For the bulk of its career, the band consisted of Edwards, Tola and Humbert, the latter two formerly of the French band Passion Fodder. After releasing four studio albums and touring extensively, the group broke up in 2005, citing "mostly political and spiritual" differences. The members continued in the groups Wovenhand and Lilium before reforming in 2025.

== Band history ==
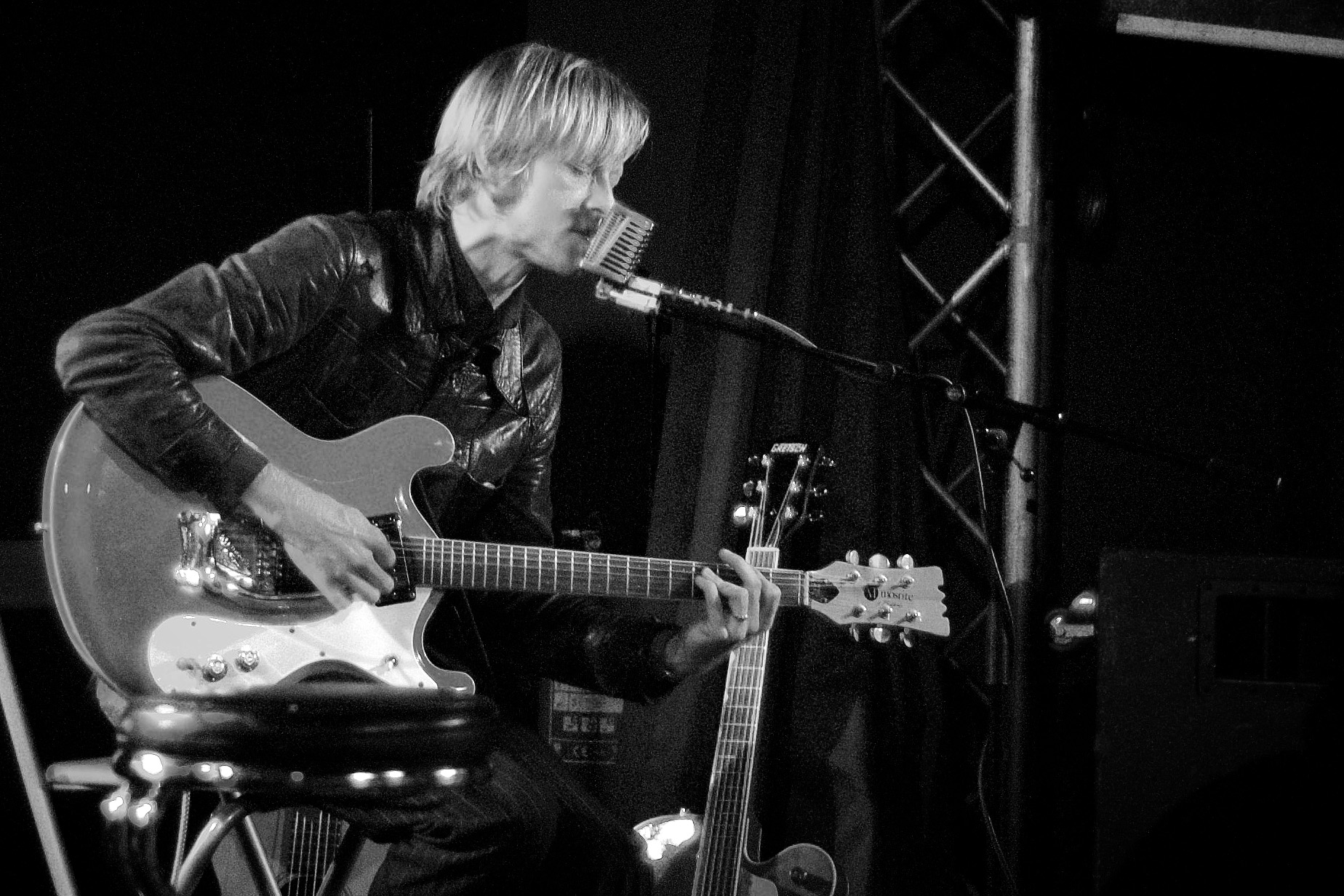
Edwards performing solo in 2004

David Eugene Edwards and Pascal Humbert formed 16 Horsepower in 1992 in Los Angeles, California, where they had met building movie sets for Roger Corman's Hollywood Studios. Friend, co-worker and trained jazz drummer Jean-Yves Tola joined shortly after. The trio performed once as Horsepower before they parted ways with Humbert as Edwards and Tola relocated to Denver, Colorado.

In Edwards's hometown of Denver, the band again became a trio with the addition of Keven Soll, a luthier and accomplished double bass player. Frustrated by misconceptions about the name Horsepower being related to heroin and inspired by a traditional American folk song about sixteen horses pulling the coffin of a beloved to the graveyard, they changed the name to 16 Horsepower. The band spent the following years rehearsing and gaining a reputation for their intense live performances while touring extensively across North America and eventually they released a seven-inch single, "Shametown", in 1994 on Ricochet Records. By this time they had gained the attention of A&M Records, and recording of Sackcloth 'n' Ashes began in 1995. For various reasons A&M postponed the release of the album, so the band returned to the studio and recorded their eponymous debut EP, which was released the same year.

The debut full-length studio album, Sackcloth 'n' Ashes, was eventually released in 1996, garnering praise from the international music press. Pascal Humbert had relocated to Denver and joined the band as a second guitarist, although his primary instrument is the bass. Following differences about the musical direction, Soll was asked to leave and was replaced by Rob Redick, later known as the bassist for Candlebox. Redick did not last long because of what the band has referred to as "kind of a mutual unhappiness", and Humbert took over the bass duties. Jeffrey-Paul Norlander joined on second guitar shortly before recording began on the second album, Low Estate, with John Parish as producer. Edwards and Norlander had previously been in several bands together, most notably The Denver Gentlemen.

Norlander departed in 1998 and was replaced by Steve Taylor, the band's guitar technician, who had already been performing on a handful of songs on the bands European tour in 1996.

Spending two years touring and writing new material, 16 Horsepower's third full-length album, Secret South, was not recorded and released until 2000. The album marked a distinct change in sound and tone from earlier releases as the up-tempo rock influences had all but vanished completely and left room for a more melodic folk-inspired sound. The band toured in Europe in 2000 with the new album, and rumours of a break-up circulated shortly after. This rumour was further fueled by the fact that the band members had begun to focus on solo and side projects. Humbert had released his solo-debut with his project Lilium the previous year and Edwards had begun recording and performing live with his new project Woven Hand.

16 Horsepower, short of Steve Taylor, returned in 2002 with Folklore. As hinted by the title, this fourth studio album took the band further into traditional folk territory and featured only four original 16 Horsepower compositions. While the band went on several tours in support of the album, their creative output was focused on Woven Hand and Lilium, Tola having also joined the latter. Olden, a compilation of previously unreleased versions of early material, was released in 2003. This release was supported by a tour in early 2004, including their first US dates in three years, featuring a set split between early material and Folklore-era songs.

On April 7, 2005 the band announced their official break-up, as a result of personal, political and spiritual differences as well as finding the constant touring incompatible with their daily lives.

Alternative Tentacles, a San Francisco-based record label run by former Dead Kennedys frontman Jello Biafra, absorbed American distribution of the band's latter records shortly before their breakup. Since the band's demise, the label has released two DVD retrospectives, and in 2008 released two-CD set Live March 2001. Humbert joined Woven Hand in 2007.

In November 2025, it was announced that 16 Horsepower have reunited to play their first show in 21 years, at the Fire in the Mountains festival in Montana in 2026. The lineup includes Edwards, Tola, and Humbert, along with Wovenhand guitarist Chuck French as a live guest. The band also embarked on a European tour consisting of 17 shows in eight countries in May and June 2026.

== Musical style ==
It has always been difficult to describe the band's music in simple terms as it borrowed just as heavily from folk music, country, bluegrass, and traditional as it did from rock music. Described as "progressive country-tinged" and "hypnotic, rustic country-rock", their music has been categorized as alternative country and gothic country-rock. They were representatives of the "Denver sound".

Edwards' grandfather was a Nazarene preacher and young Edwards often went along as his elder preached the gospel to various peoples. This experience colored his approach to songwriting as well as the instrumentation employed to develop the band's unique sound. On several tracks over the course of the band's career, Edwards evoked decisive Christian imagery, particularly that of the redemptive capacity of Jesus Christ.

16 Horsepower, especially in their early days, saw themselves first and foremost as a rock band. David Eugene Edwards, however, had an interest in all things from past times, including musical instruments. One instrument that was paramount during the nascent days of 16 Horsepower was the Chemnitzer concertina. It was erroneously credited as a bandoneon (a closely related instrument) on Sackcloth 'n' Ashes. The antique instrument used on the early tours and recordings was falling apart and quite cumbersome to tour with; some time before the sessions for Low Estate, it was replaced with the more modern American-made Patek brand instrument.

Acknowledged influences on the band included Joy Division, the Gun Club, Nick Cave and the Birthday Party. 16 Horsepower would eventually share the same management as Nick Cave and the Bad Seeds and tour with them. They also collaborated with Bertrand Cantat from French band Noir Désir on a cover of The Gun Club's "Fire Spirit" for the 1998 EP The Partisan and on "The Partisan" itself.

== Legacy ==
16 Horsepower are among the Denver-based bands credited for laying the foundation for what today has become known as "gothic country". The band was more popular in Europe than in the US; Edwards theorized that they came across as more exotic overseas as "there is something fundamentally very American about our music that makes us interesting to a European audience."

The staff of popular Dutch music magazine Oor voted Sackcloth 'n' Ashes as the fourth-best album of 1996. In 2000, the Dutch public broadcaster VPRO made a documentary about Edwards and 16 Horsepower titled The Preacher.

American metal band DevilDriver paid homage to 16 Horsepower with a cover of "Black Soul Choir" on their 2011 release, Beast.

A post-rock interpretation of "Black Soul Choir" sung by Brandy Bones became a live staple of Canadian band Big John Bates during their 2012 Battered Bones tour, and a studio version was included on their 2015 album From the Bestiary to the Leathering Room.

Their 2000 cover of "Wayfaring Stranger" was featured at the end of Bart Layton's 2012 documentary The Imposter, as well as in the opening scene of the 2021 film Titane.

== Band members ==
=== Current members ===
- David Eugene Edwards – vocals, guitar, banjo, Chemnitzer concertina, hurdy-gurdy, lap steel, bandoneon, piano (1992–2005, 2025–present)
- Jean-Yves Tola – drums, percussion, piano, vocals (1992–2005, 2025–present)
- Pascal Humbert – bass, upright bass, guitar, vocals (1992, 1996–2005, 2025–present)

=== Current live guests ===
- Chuck French – guitar, backing vocals (2025–present)

=== Former members ===
- Keven Soll – upright bass, flat top bass, cello, vocals (1993–1996)
- Rob Redick – bass (1996–1997)
- Jeffrey-Paul Norlander – fiddle, guitar, cello, organ, vocals (1997–1998)
- Steve Taylor – guitar, keyboards, vocals (1998–2001)

=== Former live guests ===
- Bob Ferbrache – lap steel guitar (1996)
- Elin Palmer – violin (2001)
- Daniel McMahon – organ (2002)
- John Rumly – guitar, bass, banjo (2002)

== Discography ==
=== Studio albums ===
- Sackcloth 'n' Ashes (CD - 1996)
- Low Estate (CD - 1997)
- Secret South (CD/vinyl - 2000)
- Folklore (CD/vinyl - 2002)

=== Compilation albums ===
- Radio Asylum Vol. 1
- Olden (CD/vinyl - 2003)
- Yours Truly (compilation 2CD/vinyl - 2011)

=== Live albums ===
- Hoarse (CD - 2000)
- Live March 2001 (CD - 2008)

=== Singles and EPs ===
- "Shametown" (vinyl 7" - 1994)
- 16 Horsepower EP (CD - 1995)
- "Black Soul Choir" (CD - 1996)
- "Haw" (vinyl - 1996)
- "For Heaven's Sake" (CD - 1997)
- "Coal Black Horses" (CD - 1997)
- "The Partisan" (CD - 1998)
- "Clogger" (CD - 2000)
- "Splinters" (CD - 2001)

=== Video ===
- "Black Soul Choir" and "Haw" (1995)
- 16HP DVD (2005)
- Live DVD (2006)
