= Chœurs =

Studio album by Bertrand Cantat, Pascal Humbert, Bernard Falaise, Alexander MacSween
- Released: 16 December 2011 (physical); 21 November 2011 (downloads)
- Recorded: 2010–2011
- Genre: Alternative rock
- Length: 57:20
- Label: Actes Sud / Au carré de l'hypoténuse

Chœurs is a joint musical album by Bertrand Cantat, Pascal Humbert, Bernard Falaise and Alexander MacSween released on Actes Sud label on 16 December 2011, although it was made available for downloads on 21 November 2011.

The 17 tracks on the album are based on the text of Sophocles translated by Robert Davreu, being the Greek chorus parts of the theatrical trilogy adaptation Le Cycle des Femmes: Trois histoires de Sophocle or just Des femmes (being the Sophocles pieces Women of Trachis, Antigone and Electra by the Lebanese-Quebec artist Wajdi Mouawad in June 2011 and presented initially at Festival d'Avignon in 2011. Tracks 1 to 8 are from Women of Trachis, tracks 9 to 13 from Antigone and 14 to 17 from Electra.

The release coincided with the Paris presentation of Le Cycle des Femmes: Trois histoires de Sophocle on Théâtre Nanterre-Amandiers in the Paris region. As Bertrand Cantat could not take part in certain presentations because of backlash to his earlier criminal record and role in murder of Marie Trintignant, in those locations his vocals were replaced by various vocalists, with concern that the authenticity of the vocals was jeopardised. But Cantat did sing actually in productions in Bordeaux region on 28 June 2011 at the Rocher de Palmer in Cenon followed by shows in Bourges, Reims, Brest, Lyon, Geneva and Athens. His scheduled appearance in Montreal's Théâtre du Nouveau Monde in May 2012 was cancelled after pressure from feminist groups and his role was taken over by Igor Quezada.

The album was released as a book disc of 32 pages and an introduction to the play by Moawad and a picture gallery in black and white and in color by Jean-Louis Fernandez. The cover photo for the release depicted Samuël Côté and Oreste.

Chœurs is the first album of Bertrand Cantat, since the album Nous n'avons fait que fuir (recorded in 2002, released in 2004), and the official demise of the group Noir Désir announced in November 2010. This is also the first album in which Cantat was credited directly rather than his band. Wajdi Mouawad declared he loved Cantat's vocals for a long time and had incorporated materials from Noir Désir in his earlier creation Temps in 2010, and asked Cantat to record texts for his work Ciels in 2009.

Bertrand Cantat agreed to do the recording provided his long-time friend Pascal Humbert was involved in the project to which Moawad agreed. Moawad also added two Quebec artists, the guitarist Bernard Falaise and drummer Alexander MacSween to complete the rock quartet.

The album was recorded in Studio Davout in Paris under the production of Jean-Loup Morette and in Studio Anywave in Bordeaux under the production of Nicolas Perego; mixing was by Jean-Loup Morette in Paris and the mastering by Bruno Green in Lennoxville, Quebec.

== Track list ==
All the music is composed by the quartet Bertrand Cantat, Pascal Humbert, Bernard Falaise and Alexander MacSween on text translated from Sophocles by Robert Davreu and adapted for singing by Bertrand Cantat and Wajdi Mouawad, except for "Dithyrambe au soleil" written by Cantat and Mouawad, and "Bury Me Now" by Cantat alone.

Bertrand Cantat was credited as vocalist, and guitar and harmonica player, Pascal Humbert on bass and double bass, Bernard Falaise on guitar and Alexander MacSween on drums and percussions.

Track	Part of trilogy	Song title	Length	Translation	Notes
1.	Women of Trachis	"Dithyrambe au soleil"	3:15	Bertrand Cantat & Wajdi Mouawad	Foley by Michel Maurer
2.	Women of Trachis	"Déjanire"	4:05	Robert Davreu	vocals from Marie-Ève Perron
3.	Women of Trachis	"Le Chœur joie"	3:17	Robert Davreu	
4.	Women of Trachis	"La Puissance de Cypris"	2:05	Robert Davreu	
5.	Women of Trachis	"Les Mouillages"	2:59	Robert Davreu	
6.	Women of Trachis	"Révélation de l'oracle"	3:38	Robert Davreu	
7.	Women of Trachis	"Puisse un vent violent se lever"	4:11	Robert Davreu	
8.	Antigone	"La Victoire de Thèbes"	5:26	Robert Davreu	vocals from Raoul Fernandez
9.	Antigone	"Rien n'est plus redoutable que l'homme"	4:52	Robert Davreu	
10.	Antigone	"Heureux sont ceux qui du malheur"	2:38	Robert Davreu	
11.	Antigone	"Éros"	3:45	Robert Davreu	
12.	Antigone	"Bury Me Now"	1:53	Wajdi Mouawad	
13.	Antigone	"Dionysos"	3:00	Robert Davreu	
14.	Electra	"Elle viendra l'Érinys"	4:13	Robert Davreu	
15.	Electra	"Courir sous la pluie"	1:43	Robert Davreu	
16.	Electra	"Le Chœur des oiseaux"	3:23	Robert Davreu	Vocals from Sara Llorca
17.	Electra	"Les Serviteurs d'Arès"	2:20	Robert Davreu	
