= Bertrand Cantat =

French musician and convicted murderer (born 1964)

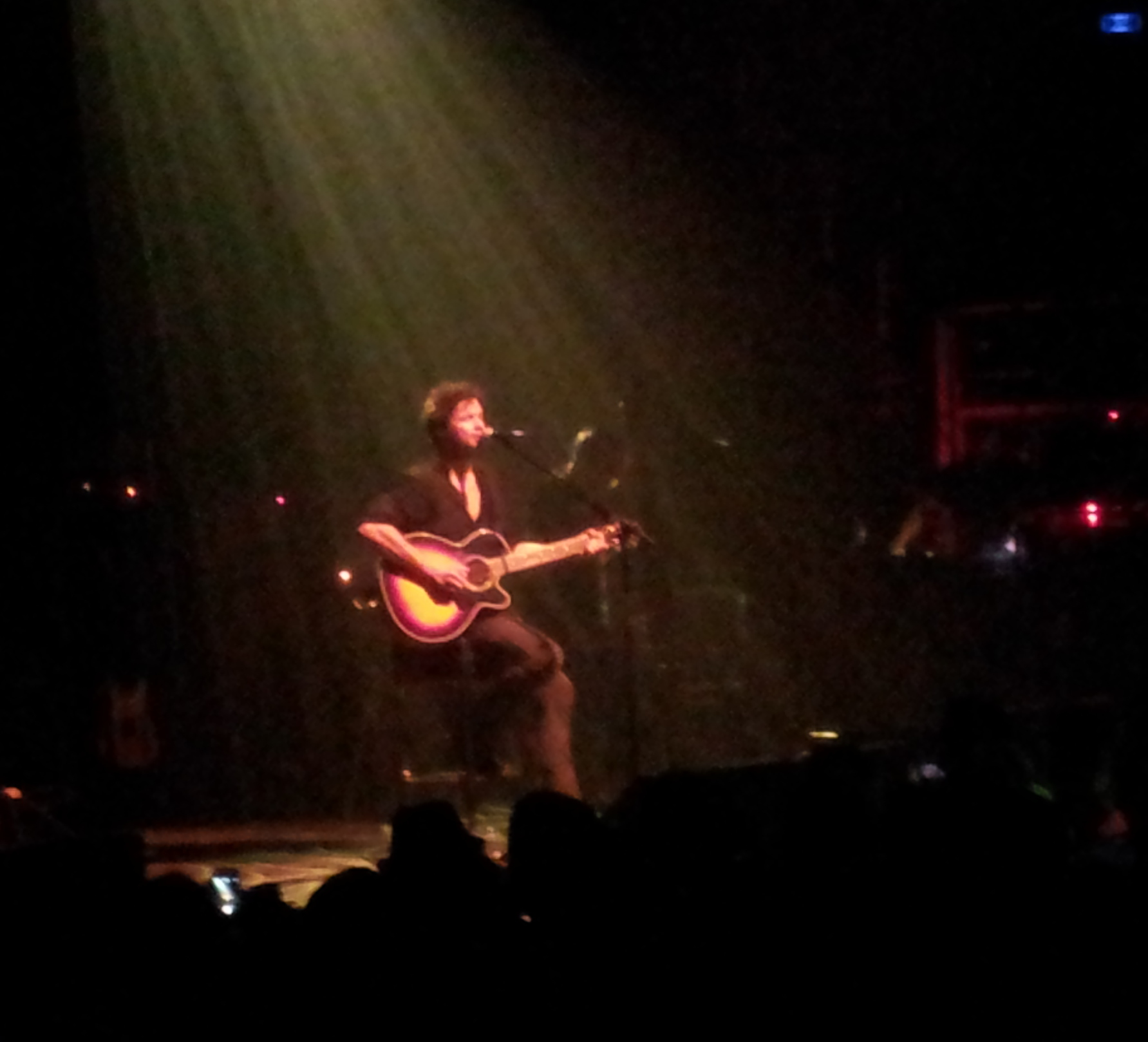
- Cantat in 2014

Background information
- Born: Bertrand Lucien Bruno Cantat; 5 March 1964 (age 62); Pau, France
- Genres: Rock, alternative rock
- Occupations: Singer-songwriter, Musician
- Instruments: Harmonica, guitar
- Years active: 1980–present
- Label: Barclay

Bertrand Lucien Bruno Cantat (French pronunciation: [bɛʁtʁɑ̃ lysjɛ̃ bʁyno kɑ̃ta], Occitan: [kanˈtat]; born 5 March 1964) is a French murderer, singer, and songwriter. The former frontman of the rock band Noir Désir, in 2003, he was convicted of the manslaughter ("murder with indirect intent" – dolus eventualis) of French actress Marie Trintignant, which occurred in a hotel room in Vilnius. To some controversy, Cantat returned to Noir Désir after his release from prison in 2007, playing with the group until it disbanded in 2010. He subsequently formed a musical duo with Pascal Humbert, calling themselves Détroit.

== Early life ==
Cantat was born in Pau, Pyrénées-Atlantiques. The son of a navy officer, he spent his childhood in Le Havre. His family moved when he was an adolescent to Bordeaux. At the lycée Saint-Genès, he met Denis Barthe, Serge Teyssot-Gay, and Frédéric Vidalenc, who soon became members of his band.

== Music career ==
=== Noir Désir 1990-2010 ===
At the height of Noir Désir's success in the 1990s, Cantat was a prominent figure in French music. Noir Désir is regarded "to have made the history of the French rock scene for three decades". He was known for the quality of his lyrics, charisma, and live performances, often compared to Jim Morrison of the Doors.

In 2003, Cantat was arrested for beating his girlfriend, Marie Trintignant, who died five days later in hospital. He was then charged and convicted of manslaughter with indirect intent [dolus eventualis]. Following his guilty sentence of manslaughter in 2004, Cantat was sentenced to eight years in a Lithuanian prison, but would eventually be transferred back to France. He was released on probation in 2007.

In October 2010, three months after his probational status of release was lifted and his sentence declared completed, Cantat resumed his musical career with a gig in Bordeaux. His re-entry into the public eye upset women's rights campaigners and victim support groups. On 30 November 2010, Noir Désir announced that it would split up for good. Cantat has continued as a solo musician.

=== Going solo, 2011–2013 ===
==== Wajdi Mouawad ====
In early 2011, Lebanese-Canadian playwright Wajdi Mouawad chose Cantat to sing in his production in Montreal of a Sophocles cycle, entitled Chœurs. This sparked public criticism due to Cantat's manslaughter conviction. Politicians proposed to ban Cantat's entry into the country, as Canada's immigration legislation bars from entry anyone convicted abroad of a crime which is punishable in Canada by a maximum term of at least ten years in prison, until at least five years have passed since the end of the complete sentence handed down. Manslaughter carries a maximum penalty of life imprisonment in Canada.

==== Chœurs ====
In April 2011, the artistic director of Théâtre du Nouveau Monde, Lorraine Pintal, announced that Cantat would not be performing in Chœurs. Wajdi Mouawad responded to the controversy by publishing an open letter to his three-year-old daughter Aimee in the newspaper Le Devoir, in which he argued for Cantat's right to full reintegration into society.

In November 2011, Cantat released the album Chœurs, composed for Mouawad's namesake production with musicians Pascal Humbert, Bernard Falaise, and Alexander MacSween.

==== Détroit ====
In November 2013, Cantat released the album Horizons, credited to his duo Détroit with Pascal Humbert on Barclay Records label. The first single, titled "Droit dans le soleil", had been released on 30 September 2013.

=== 2014-present ===
In 2018, Cantat was set to appear in a string of festivals. In response to the news, a petition to remove him from the Normandy festivals was spread online, gaining almost 75,000 signatures. The petition stated that by inviting him, they "trivialise domestic violence and violence against women." He pulled out of all festival appearances.

== Murder of Marie Trintignant ==
=== Murder ===
In 2002, Cantat began an affair with French actress Marie Trintignant after meeting at his concert. In 2003, the two were in Vilnius, Lithuania, while Trintignant was filming the television movie, Colette, une femme libre.

On July 27, local authorities received a call from Trintignant's brother, Vincent, for emergency services for Trintignant. According to Cantat, the previous night, Trintignant received a text from her estranged husband, Samuel Benchetrit and the two began arguing. In initial interviews with authorities, Cantat claimed that she became physical and he hit her in response, accidentally knocking her down and causing her to hit her head on the radiator. He claimed he put her to bed around 1AM and called her ex for relationship advice. He then called Vincent to come over. After reviewing the situation and realizing she would not wake up, Vincent decided to call the police.

Trintignant was taken to a local hospital, where she had two surgeries performed. After four days, severely injured and still in a deep coma, her parents had her transferred back to Paris. She died of a cerebral edema the following day, August 1. Trintignant was 41 at the time of her death and left four young sons. Cantat was detained by the police upon their initial arrival, where he gave his initial account of the incident.

The post-mortem examination suggested that Cantat had inflicted nineteen blows to Trintignant's head, causing irreversible brain damage. A separate French inquiry determined she died from violent shaking and severe, repeated blows.

=== Trial ===
Cantat was charged with murder with indirect intent under Lithuanian law.

The defence portrayed her death as a crime of passion and a "tragic accident," which carries a lighter sentence in Lithuania. They argued that Trintignant became enraged during their fight, yelling at him to return to his wife. Cantat claimed he "slapped" Trintignant four times after she attacked him and threw her onto a sofa before leaving the room. He would later clean her blood and put her to bed, claiming to believe she was just in a deep sleep. Krisztina Rády, Cantat's estranged wife, testified that he was "very good and very gentle." She denied he had ever been violent towards her.

The prosecution's argument was that Cantat became enraged by the text and the argument, before severely beating Trintignant. They also cited Cantat's failure to call for assistance for seven hours, as an aggravating factor. Samuel Benchetrit, Trintignant's estranged husband, testified that she had told him she was a victim of violence. He claimed Trintignant told him that Cantat had struck her and even chased her with a knife at one point.

The trial lasted three days. In March 2004, Cantat was sentenced by Vilnius Regional Court under Article 129 of the Lithuanian Criminal Code to eight years in prison for manslaughter, committed with indirect intent (dolus eventualis). The verdict was at first appealed by Trintignant's family, who believed that her killing warranted a harsher sentence, and later by Cantat, who wanted the higher court to reclassify his crime as manslaughter, and therefore lessen his sentence. Both parties ultimately decided to cancel their appeals, which rendered final the original sentence of eight years. At the request of his lawyers, Cantat was moved from the Lithuanian Lukiškės prison, to a prison near Muret, France, in September 2004.

=== Parole and release ===
Cantat served four years of his eight-year sentence in prison. According to French law, after half of a prison sentence has been served, a criminal with good behavior can be released to serve the rest of his sentence on parole.

Cantat was released from the French prison on parole in October 2007. His early release aroused the anger of women's rights activists and the victim's parents, who had failed to persuade French President Nicolas Sarkozy and French judges to block his early release. His parole status was lifted in 2010.

== Personal life ==
In 1997, Cantat married Krisztina Rády, an art director of Hungarian descent, with whom he had two children; Milo, born in 1998, and Alice, born in 2003.

In September 2003, Cantat's Moustey house was burned down. His spouse and his two children were supposed to be in the house at that time, but were in Bordeaux, instead.

=== Krisztina Rády's death ===
It was ruled that on the night of 10 January 2010, Rády killed herself. At the time of her death, Cantat and their 2 children were present in the house. She was discovered by their children the following day.

Shortly before her death, Rády had complained of mental abuse by Cantat. The physical abuse she complained of on the answering machine is that he threw some objects at her. According to Cantat, Rády's parents had spent a week with him after the suicide.

Accused by lawyer Yael Mellul, magistrates in Bordeaux investigated Cantat in connection with Rády's suicide, but ultimately decided not to press charges.

In 2023, journalist Anne-Sophie Jahn released her book, Désir noir, after having spoken to a former Noir Désir member, French music industry insiders, and medical professionals. The book claims that Rády was abused by Cantat throughout their entire relationship and it was an industry secret. Jahn interviewed a medical provider of Rády who claimed that Rády had entered the hospital with suspicious injuries including scalp detachment consistent with being dragged by her hair. She included these claims in her 2025 Netflix documentary mini-series From Rockstar to Killer - The Cantat Case. Cantat has denied all claims from Jahn's book.

== Discography ==
=== Albums ===
Year	Album	Peak positions
Year	Album	FRA
2017	Amor fati	13

=== Singles ===
As lead artist

Year	Single	Peak positions
Year	Single	FRA
2017	"L'Angleterre"	10

Featured in

Year	Single	Peak positions	
Year	Single	FRA	BEL (Wa)
2012	"Oh Amadou" (Amadou & Mariam feat. Bertrand Cantat)	176	46*

*Did not appear in the official Belgian Ultratop 50 charts, but rather in the bubbling under Ultratip charts.
