= Wovenhand =

American rock band

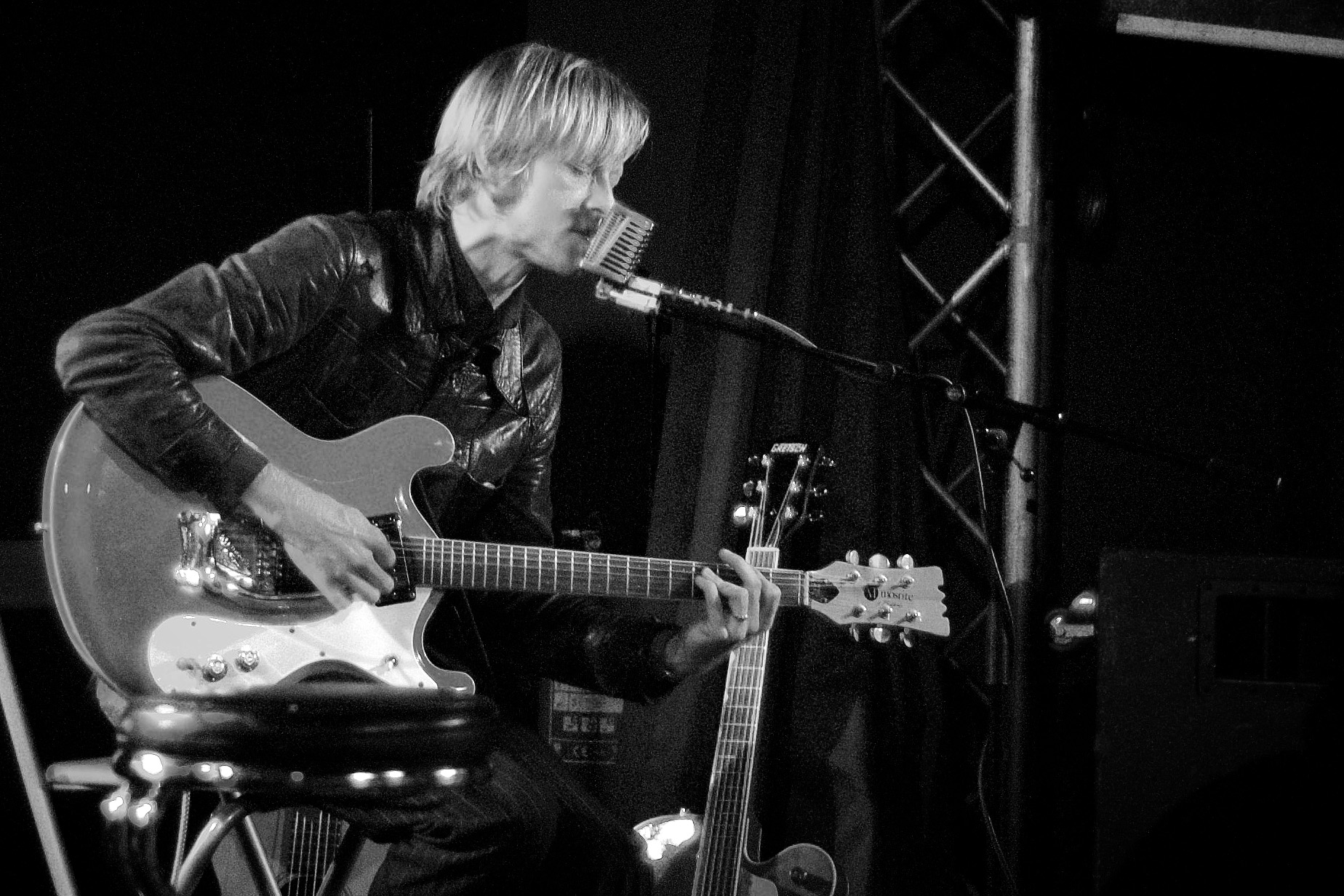
- David Eugene Edwards live 2004

Background information
- Origin: Denver, Colorado, U.S.
- Genres: Folk rock; gothic country (early)
- Years active: 2001–present
- Labels: Glitterhouse Records, Sounds Familyre, Deathwish Inc., Sargent House
- Spinoff of: 16 Horsepower
- Members: David Eugene Edwards; Chuck French; Neil Keener
- Past members: Ordy Garrison; Daniel McMahon; Paul Fonfara; Shane Trost; Peter Van Laerhoven; Gregory Garcia Jr; Pascal Humbert
- Website: wovenhandband.com

Wovenhand (also stylized Woven Hand) is an American rock band from Denver, Colorado, led by 16 Horsepower frontperson David Eugene Edwards. Wovenhand's music combines influences from Southern Gothic music, old-time music, folk music, gospel music, and rock and roll, among other genres and styles of music.

Wovenhand's songs are known for their strong and stark Biblical references, influenced by Edwards' dark approach to his Christian faith.

== History ==
The band began in 2001 as a solo project for Edwards while 16 Horsepower was taking a temporary hiatus. Wovenhand's first live shows were performed by Edwards and multi-instrumentalist Daniel McMahon; the self-titled debut album was released in 2002 on Glitterhouse Records. Performances following this record featured Edwards, McMahon, drummer Ordy Garrison and cellist Paul Fonfara. 2003 saw the release of Blush Music, the score to a dance performance mostly composed of reworked material from the first record. Touring behind this album featured Shane Trost replacing Fonfara.

In 2004, Consider the Birds was released on the Sounds Familyre label, which has also released the previous Wovenhand releases domestically. Edwards performed the bulk of the instrumentation in the studio; he and Garrison toured behind the record as a two-piece. 16 Horsepower disbanded the following year, and Edwards further focused his attention on Wovenhand. Peter van Laerhoven, a Belgian guitarist, was added to the lineup, while McMahon and Trost became inactive with the group.

After 2006's Mosaic, Pascal Humbert, a founding member of 16 Horsepower, became the band's bassist. 2008's Ten Stones was the first record from the group written and performed collaboratively – the project had thus evolved into a proper band, albeit with Edwards firmly at its head. In 2009, the band operated as a three-piece, sans Van Laerhoven.

Their fifth studio album, The Threshingfloor was released in June 2010. Shortly thereafter, the group announced touring plans opening for the progressive metal band Tool.

September 2012 saw the release of Wovenhand's sixth studio album, The Laughing Stalk, produced by Alexander Hacke (who along with Edwards is participating in the reunion of Australian post-punk band Crime And The City Solution). Wovenhand's lineup for the album was changed once again, as Humbert quit and new bassist Gregory Garcia Jr. along with second guitarist Chuck French were brought in. The resulting record was described as being "the most heavy incarnation that ever existed of Wovenhand".

Ordy Garrison died on July 4, 2023.

== Discography ==
=== Studio albums ===
Album	Details	Peak positions								
Album	Details	NL	SWE	BEL (FL)	BEL (WA)	GER	FRA	SWI	NOR	AUT
Woven Hand	Released:March 25, 2002; Label:Glitterhouse Records; Formats: CD, LP, Vinyl LP	—	—	—	—	—	—	—	—	—
Consider the Birds	Released:September 27, 2004; Label:Glitterhouse Records; Formats: CD, LP, Vinyl LP	—	—	74	—	—	—	—	—	—
Mosaic	Released:June 16, 2006; Label:Glitterhouse Records; Formats: CD, LP, Vinyl LP	90	—	43	—	—	—	—	—	—
Ten Stones	Released:September 9, 2008; Label:Glitterhouse Records; Formats: CD, LP, Vinyl LP	85	52	40	—	—	143	—	—	—
The Threshingfloor	Released:June 22, 2010; Label:Glitterhouse Records; Formats: CD, LP, Vinyl LP	—	39	56	—	—	—	—	23	—
The Laughing Stalk	Released:September 7, 2012; Label:Glitterhouse Records; Formats: CD, LP, Vinyl LP	56	33	41	118	—	—	—	—	—
Refractory Obdurate	Released:April 29, 2014; Label:Glitterhouse Records; Formats: CD, LP, Vinyl LP	41	—	49	116	—	—	—	—	—
Star Treatment	Released:September 9, 2016; Label:Glitterhouse Records; Formats: CD, LP, Vinyl LP	52	—	40	80	88	—	92	—	66
Silver Sash	Released:February 4, 2022; Label:Glitterhouse Records; Formats: CD, LP, Digital download, streaming	—	—	—	162	57	—	—	—	—

=== Other ===
- Blush Music (2003) [performance score]
- Blush (Original Score) (2003) [performance score]
- Puur (2006) [performance score]
- Black of the Ink (2011) [Book + 6-track EP re-recorded Best-of]
- Live at Roepaen (2012) [CD/2LP + DVD]
