= 16 Horsepower (EP) =

16 Horsepower EP

EP by 16 Horsepower
- Released: November 7, 1995
- Recorded: 1992–1995
- Labels: Ricochet; A&M
- Producers: Michael W. Douglass and Alex Reed

16 Horsepower chronology
| 16 Horsepower EP (1995) | Sackcloth 'n' Ashes (1996) |

16 Horsepower is the first EP by the band of the same name. It was released on November 7, 1995. It is often referred to simply as the Haw EP amongst fans, noting to the title of the first track. It is the group's second release, following the "Shametown" 7" vinyl record of 1994, the A-side of which was re-recorded here.

== Track listing ==
| No. | Title | Length |
|---|---|---|
| 1. | "Haw" | 3:29 |
| 2. | "South Pennsylvania Waltz" | 5:15 |
| 3. | "Shametown" | 2:45 |
| 4. | "Straight-Mouth Stomp" | 1:52 |
| 5. | "Coal Black Horses" | 3:49 |
| 6. | "I Gotta Gal" | 2:05 |
