= Glitterhouse Records =

German independent record label

Coordinates: 51°40′18″N 9°22′56″E

- Founded: 1984
- Founder: Reinhard Holstein, Rembert Stiewe
- Distributor(s): D: Indigo / A: Hoanzl / CH: Irrascible and various distributors in Europe and Asia
- Genre: Indie rock, Folk, singer-songwriter, Rock, World music
- Country of origin: Germany
- Location: Beverungen, North Rhine-Westphalia
- Official website: label.glitterhouse.com

Glitterhouse Records is a German independent record label and mail order company based in Beverungen, North Rhine-Westphalia. It was founded in the mid-1980s. From the late 1980s until the mid-1990s it was the European branch of the American label Sub Pop. Since 1997 the annual Orange Blossom Special Festival has been staged behind the Glitterhouse headquarters. Glitterhouse created the subsidiary Glitterbeat Records label (2012) and Stag-O-Lee Mailorder record shop.

== History ==
=== The beginning ===
The fanzine „The Glitterhouse", founded in 1981 by Reinhard Holstein and Rembert Stiewe, laid the foundation for the Glitterhouse Records label. The magazine covered mainly 60s garage and psychedelia, extensions of punk, weirdo folk, and similar genres. After a vacation in Australia, Holstein imported a number of singles from Citadel Records, which were distributed through the company's mail order business. Glitterhouse's dirst own release was a cassette tape featuring German garage bands titled Battle of the Bands. In 1987 the 7"-single "Sound of The Young Soul" by The Hipsters and the compilation LP The Declaration of Fuzz were Glitterhouse's first vinyl records. German artists followed, such as Surfin’ Dead, The Strangemen and Shiny Gnomes. By legal registration as a business in 1984, Glitterhouse Records was transformed from a simple hobby to an enterprise.

=== 1987-1994: Distribution agreements ===
In 1987 Glitterhouse started European distribution of recordings on American label Sub Pop, of Seattle, Washington. Among other bands, Sub Pop had signed Nirvana and Soundgarden; later on it was named the trigger and forerunner for the success of grunge music. This cooperation provided Glitterhouse increased popularity and a better market position. Green River, Mudhoney, The Walkabouts, Tad, Supersuckers and Seaweed, later on also the Afghan Whigs, The Spinanes, Codeine, Big Chief, Pond and many other Sub Pop groups were marketed through Glitterhouse in Europe. The cooperative transatlantic corporation with Sub Pop lasted seven years, ending in 1995 by mutual agreement.

Parallel to Sub Pop, Glitterhouse also handled European distribution for the American noise rock label Amphetamine Reptile Records, including the bands Helmet, Cows, and God Bullies. Glitterhouse ended the Amphetamine Reptile distribution arrangement when it no longer liked the artistic products.

Simultaneously, Glitterhouse signed other bands directly, including The Real Gone Lovers of Canberra, Australia, in 1988; Monster Magnet; Sylvia Juncosa, Sister Double Happiness; and Bitch Magnet.

=== 1994 and later ===
Starting in 1994, Glitterhouse shifted away from distributing other record companies' recordings. In addition to alternative rock and various American musicians, Glitterhouse signed many new bands of Scandinavian and English origin. Since then a broad variety of musical styles has been covered by Glitterhouse Records:

- widescreen-pop (Midnight Choir, The White Birch);
- indie-electronica (Lilium, Ai Phoenix);
- avant-garde (David Thomas & Two Pale Boys, Pere Ubu);
- dark indie folk (Wovenhand, 16 Horsepower, Chris & Carla, The Walkabouts, Dakota Suite, Savoy Grand, Willard Grant Conspiracy);
- rock (BigBang, The Great Crusades);
- indie rock (Lampshade, Mount Washington, Seachange);
- modern singer-songwriters (Scott Matthew, Caroline Keating, Christine Owman, Nive [Nielsen] & The Deer Children, Andrea Schroeder (singer));
- world music acts (Tamikrest, Lobi Traoré, Dirtmusic, Ben Zabo).

Glitterhouse Records was the first German indie label autonomously covering all inner-European and non-European export markets with exclusive deals.

=== Today ===
Up to the present day, Glitterhouse has released about 750 records. Once a month a mail order catalogue containing approximately is released. Glitterhouse has 10 permanent employees, one apprentice and three interns. Currently the "Glitterhouse Projects GmbH & Co KG", a limited company, comprises

- "Glitterhouse Records"

as well as its subsidiaries/partners

- "Stag-O-Lee Mailorder" record shop, specializing in esoteric garage Rock’n’Roll, vintage rhythm and blues, etc., as of 2022;
- "Glitterhouse Mailorder", issuing a monthly mail-order catalogue with approximately 1300 titles;
- "Orange Blossom Special Festival" annual, as of 2022, outdoor music festival behind the Glitterhouse company office, starting in 1997.

Glitterhouse is way more than the sum of its parts. We are family.

— Rembert Stiewe

== Bands ==
Current artists
Christine Owman
Caroline Keating
Cash Savage and the Last Drinks
Boy Division
Adele&Glenn
Andrea Schroeder (singer)
Spain
Nive (Nielsen) & The Deer Children
Penelope Houston
Golden Kanine
The Bambi Molesters
Mount Washington
The Great Crusades
Savoy Grand
Wolfgang Michels
Musée Mécanique
Michael J. Sheehy
L/O/N/G
Lilium
Dirtmusic
Elva Snow
The Jeffrey Lee Pierce Sessions
Got No Chains
Carla Torgeson
Chris & Carla
Timesbold
The Walkabouts
Scott Matthew
Dakota Suite
16 Horsepower
Wovenhand
Chris Eckman
Willard Grant Conspiracy
Joe Volk

Former artists
The Strangemen
Hugo Race & True Spirit
Hobotalk
Midnight Choir
BigBang
The White Birch
Boy Omega
Seachange
David Thomas
Friends of Dean Martinez
Terry Lee Hale
Ai Phoenix
Pere Ubu
Rainer
Ben Weaver
David Munyon
Lampshade
Locust Fudge
Hip Young Things
Vanilla Chainsaws
The Melvins
Codeine
Helmet
Real Gone Lovers
Afghan Whigs
Mark Lanegan
Tad
Velocity Girl
Mudhoney|
Green River
Shiny Gnomes
Broken Jug
Miracle Workers
Monster Magnet
Chokebore
Larry Barrett
Gary Floyd
Richard Buckner
The Minus 5
The Shivers
Go to Blazes
Kim Salmon
Jacobites
Steve Westfield
Nikki Sudden
Neal Casal
Jon Dee Graham
Nadine
Buddy & The Huddle
Tilman Rossmy
Johnny Dowd
Steve Wynn
Mark Olson
Howe Gelb
Hazeldine
Granfaloon Bus
Ramsay Midwood

== See also ==
- List of record labels
