= C'était ici =

Live album by Yann Tiersen
- Released: 30 September 2002
- Recorded: 15–17 February 2002 at the Cité de la Musique
- Genre: Avant-Garde
- Length: 1:48:52
- Label: EMI France
- Producer: Yann Tiersen

Yann Tiersen chronology
L'Absente (2001)	C'était ici (2002)	Good Bye Lenin! (2003)

C'était ici is the second live album of French Avant-Garde musician and composer Yann Tiersen. It was recorded during three concerts performed on 15, 16, and 17 February 2002, at the Cité de la Musique in Paris, France. The album is noteworthy because of the many collaborators appearing in the performances such as the 35-member orchestral group Synaxis, conducted by Guillaume Bourgogne, Claire Pichet, Christine Ott, Christian Quermalet, Marc Sens, Nicolas Stevens, Jean-François Assy, Renaud Lhoest, Olivier Tilkin, Ronan le bars, Les Têtes Raides, Dominique A and Lisa Germano.

On this album, the track entitled "La Noyée" is actually a piece by Serge Gainsbourg featured on the original soundtrack of the 1970 film Le Roman d'un voleur de chevaux, a 1970 film directed by Abraham Polonsky and Fedor Hanzekovic starring Yul Brynner, Eli Wallach, Jane Birkin, Serge Gainsbourg among many others. Yann Tiersen's piece with the same title, "La Noyée II", is the track number five of the second disc.

== Reception ==
Heather Fares of AllMusic commended the album's showcase of Tiersen's musical versatility, and its balanced representation of Tiersen's repertoire. She praised the album for giving equal attention to the different facets of Tiersen's music, including vocal pieces such as the eerie and beautiful "La Rupture," and tracks influenced by French pop, rock, and folk, like "La Terrasse," "Déjà Loin," and "Sur le Fil." Fares described the album as a comprehensive introduction to Tiersen's work for newcomers and a celebration of his talent for existing fans.

Professional ratings
Review scores
Source	Rating
Allmusic	4/5 stars

== Track listing ==
CD 1

1. "Intro" - 0:25
2. "La valse d'Amélie" - 2:05
3. "C'était ici" - 1:53
4. "Rue des cascades" - 5:41 (Sung by Claire Pichet)
5. "La rupture" - 2:43 (Sung by Claire Pichet)
6. "La terrasse" - 3:57 (Sung by Yann Tiersen)
7. "Déjà loin" - 3:02
8. "Sur le fil" - 3:38
9. "Le jour d'avant" - 4:19
10. "Le banquet" - 2:55
11. "Les jours tristes" - 3:41 (Sung by Christian Quermalet)
12. "La noyée" - 3:24 (Sung by Yann Tiersen)
13. "Le moulin" - 4:03
14. "Le fromveur" - 2:11
15. "L'homme aux bras ballants" - 6:04
16. "L'autre valse d'Amélie" - 2:50

CD 2

1. "Bagatelle" - 4:17 (Sung by Dominique A)
2. "Le méridien" - 3:58 (Sung by Lisa Germano)
3. "L'absente" - 3:25
4. "La parade" - 3:34 (Sung by Lisa Germano and Claire Pichet)
5. "La noyée II" - 2:39
6. "Monochrome" - 3:46 (Sung by Dominique A)
7. "Plus au sud" - 2:53
8. "Les bras de mer" - 4:03 (Sung by Dominique A)
9. "Comptine d'un autre été : L'après-midi" - 2:24
10. "Le quartier" - 1:45
11. "La crise" - 3:05
12. "Février" - 12:57
13. "La valse des monstres" - 7:15

== Credits ==
- Yann Tiersen - accordion on "La Valse d'Amélie", "C'était ici", "Rue des cascades", "Le Jour d'avant", "Le Banquet", and "La Noyée II"; piano on "Rue des cascades", "La Rupture", "La Terrasse", "Déjà loin", "Les Jours tristes", "La Noyée", "Le Moulin", "L'Absente", "La Parade", "Monochrome", "Les Bras de mer", and "Comptine d'un autre été: l'après midi"; violin on "Sur le fil", "Le Fromveur", "L'Homme aux bras ballants", "Bagatelle", "Le Quartier", "La Crise", and "Février"; melodica on "Le Moulin"; vibraphone on "L'Autre Valse d'Amélie"; bass on "Le Méridien"; guitar on "Plus au Sud"; toy piano on "La Valse des monstres"
- Ensemble Orchestral Synaxis on "La Valse d'Amélie", "C'était ici", "La Rupture", "La Terrasse", "Déjà loin", "Les Jours tristes", "Le Fromveur", "L'Homme aux bras ballants", "Bagatelle", "Le Méridien", "Monochrome", "Plus au Sud", and "Les Bras de mer"
- Christian Quermalet - bass on "La Valse d'Amélie" and "C'était ici"; drum on "Le Banquet", "Bagatelle", "Le Méridien", "Monochrome", "Plus au Sud", "Le Quartier", "La Crise", and "Février"; guitar on "La Rupture", "La Terrasse", "La Noyée", and "Les Bras de mer"
- Marc Sens - guitar on "La Rupture", "La Terrasse", "La Noyée", "Bagatelle", "Le Méridien", "Plus au Sud", "Les Bras de mer", "La Crise", and "Février"
- Christine Ott - ondes Martenot on "La Rupture", "La Terrasse", "Les Jours tristes", "La Noyée", "L'Autre Valse d'Amélie", "Bagatelle", "La Parade", "Les Bras de mer", "La Crise", and "Février".
- Claire Pichet - toy piano on "La Noyée"; tambourine on "Bagatelle"; melodica and percussions on "Plus au Sud"
- Ronan Le Bars - uilleann pipes on "Le Fromveur" and "L'Homme aux bras ballants"
- Dominique A - guitar on "Plus au Sud"
- Jean-François Assy - bass on "Plus au Sud" and "Février"
- Têtes Raides on "Le Jour d'avant" et "La Noyée II"
- Iso (Têtes Raides) - saxophone on "Février"
- Quatuor à cordes on "C'était ici", "La Rupture", "La Terrasse", "Déjà Loin", "Les Jours tristes", "Le Fromveur", "Bagatelle", "Monochrome", "Plus au Sud", and "Les Bras de mer".

== Charts ==
Chart (2002)	Peak position
French Albums Chart	8
Swiss Albums Chart	64

== Certifications and sales ==
Region	Certification	Certified units/sales
France (SNEP)	Gold	100,000^{*}
^{*} Sales figures based on certification alone.
