= Le Phare =

Studio album by Yann Tiersen
- Released: 20 February 1998
- Recorded: 1998
- Length: 43:56
- Label: Ici, d'ailleurs...

Yann Tiersen chronology
Rue des cascades (1996)	Le Phare (1998)	Tout est Calme (1999)

For the proposed skyscraper in Paris, see Le Phare (skyscraper).

Le Phare (English: The Lighthouse) is the third studio album by French composer Yann Tiersen. This was the artist's breakthrough album. He collaborated with distinguished French songwriter Dominique A (who wrote and provided vocals to both "Monochrome" and "Les Bras de mer"). It is typical of Tiersen's work for violin, mandolin, accordion and piano to feature heavily. Also a trademark feature of his style is unusual instrumentation, including a bicycle wheel, typewriters and saucepans. Three songs from this album, "La Dispute", "La Noyée", and "Sur le fil" were used later for Tiersen's soundtrack for the film Le Fabuleux Destin d'Amélie Poulain. "L'Homme aux bras ballants" is also the soundtrack to a short film by the same name by Laurent Gorgiard. "Sur le fil" has become a live favourite, normally only the violin section performed with great intensity, sometimes even breaking many hairs on the bow.

== Reception ==
Professional ratings
Review scores
Source	Rating
Allmusic	4/5 stars

== Track listing ==
All tracks are written by Yann Tiersen except track #12, "Les Bras de mer", written by Dominique A

No.	Title	Lead vocals	Length
1.	"Le Quartier"		2:01
2.	"La Rupture"	Claire Pichet	2:49
3.	"Monochrome"	Dominique A	3:16
4.	"La Dispute"		4:14
5.	"L'Arrivée sur l'île"		1:03
6.	"La Noyée"		2:23
7.	"Le Fromveur"		1:20
8.	"L'Homme aux bras ballants"		5:05
9.	"Sur le fil"		7:28
10.	"Les Jours heureux"		2:10
11.	"La Crise"		1:37
12.	"Les Bras de mer" (written by Dominique A)	Dominique A	3:10
13.	"La Chute"		5:48
14.	"L'Effondrement"		1:32
Total length:			43:56

== Personnel ==
This also contains all the instruments used on the album.

Musicians

- Yann Tiersen - violins, accordion, piano, mandolins, guitar, typewriter, small and big saucepans, cooking pot, tam-tam, banjo, harpsichord, oud, acoustic guitar, 12 stringed guitar, toy piano, vibraphone, cello, melodica, chimes, bowed mandolins, bicycles, bontempi, vocals
- Claire Pichet - vocals on "La Rupture"
- Dominique A - vocals on "Monochrome", vocals, piano, and guitar on "Les Bras de mer"
- Sacha Toorop - percussion, drum kit, big drum, and small bell on "Le Quartier", "La Rupture", "Monochrome", and "Les Bras de mer"

Production

- Stephane Kraemer - engineer, mixing
- Frank Loriou - artwork
- Renaud Monfourny - photography

== Charts ==
Chart (1998)	Peak position
French Albums Chart	50

== Certifications and sales ==
Region	Certification	Certified units/sales
France (SNEP)	Gold	100,000^{*}
^{*} Sales figures based on certification alone.

According to Music for New Zealand the album has sold over 160,000 copies.
