= L'Absente =

Studio album by Yann Tiersen
- Released: 5 June 2001
- Recorded: 2000–2001
- Genre: Classical crossover
- Length: 45:32
- Label: EMI France
- Producer: Yann Tiersen

Yann Tiersen chronology
Amélie (2001)	L'Absente (2001)	C'était ici (2002)

L'Absente is the fourth studio album by French composer and musician Yann Tiersen. When French film director Jean-Pierre Jeunet asked Tiersen if he was interested in writing the film score for Amélie, Tiersen was already working on L'Absente. The album was released on 5 June 2001 through EMI France, and was preceded by two promotional singles for "À quai" and "Bagatelle". L'Absente is an album of great variety with Tiersen playing many instruments including an old-fashioned typewriter and a pot, and it is characterized by several guests contributions provided by the 35-member Ensemble Orchestral Synaxis conducted by Guillaume Bourgogne, French folk rock group Têtes Raides, singers Dominique A, Lisa Germano, Neil Hannon, and Belgian actress Natacha Régnier, ondes Martenot player Christine Ott, Christian Quermalet, guitarist Marc Sens, viola player Bertrand Lambert, violinists Yann Bisquay and Sophie Naboulay, saxophonist Grégoire Simon, and drummer Sacha Toorop. L'Absente peaked at number 41 on the French Albums Chart.

== Reception ==
Professional ratings
Review scores
Source	Rating
Allmusic	4.5/5 stars

== Track listing ==
All music and lyrics are written by Yann Tiersen, except as noted.

1. "À quai" – 4:22
2. "La Parade" – 3:18 – (sung by Lisa Germano)
3. "Bagatelle" (Dominique A/Tiersen) – 4:40 – (sung by Dominique A)
4. "L'Absente" – 3:18
5. "Le Jour d'avant" (Têtes Raides/Tiersen) – 5:07
6. "Les Jours tristes" (Neil Hannon/Tiersen) – 3:20 – (sung by Neil Hannon)
7. "L'Échec" – 2:50 – (sung by Natacha Régnier and Yann Tiersen)
8. "La Lettre d'explication" (Têtes Raides/Tiersen) – 2:30
9. "Qu'en reste-t-il?" – 3:40
10. "Le Méridien" – 4:16 – (sung by Lisa Germano)
11. "Le Concert" (Tiersen/Christian Quermalet/Marc Sens/Anne-Gaëlle Bisquay/Gregoire Simon) – 2:49 – (sung by Natacha Régnier and Yann Tiersen)
12. "Le Retour" – 5:22

The vinyl edition contains an additional track, "L'Autre lettre", written and recorded by Yann Tiersen and Les Têtes Raides.

A 2×CD limited edition of the album was released through Virgin France in 2001. The second CD contains live versions of the following pieces:

1. "La Valse d'Amelie"
2. "Deja Loin"
3. "Monochrome"
4. "Bagatelle"
5. "La Parade"
6. "Le Jour d'avant"

== Credits ==
- Yann Tiersen – vibraphone, mandolin, accordion, banjo, chime, harpsichord, toy piano, guitar, piano, bass, bells, vocals, Bontempi, typewriter, pot, Elliot's car and music box, viola, tom, cello
- Christine Ott – ondes Martenot on "À quai", "La Parade", "Bagatelle", "Les Jours tristes", "L'Échec", and "Le Méridien"
- Ensemble Orchestral Synaxis are featured on "À quai", "La Parade", "Bagatelle", and "Le Méridien"
- Lisa Germano – vocals on "La Parade" and "Le Méridien"
- Anne-Gaëlle Bisquay – cello on "La Parade", "L'Échec", and "Le Concert"
- Bertrand Lambert – viola on "La Parade" and "L'Échec"
- Yann Bisquay – violin on "La Parade" and "L'Échec"
- Natacha Régnier – vocals on "L'Échec" and "Le Concert"
- Dominique A – vocals on "Bagatelle", guitar on "Le Méridien"
- Christian Quermalet – Rhodes piano on "Bagatelle", drums on "Les Jours tristes", and piano on "Le Concert"
- Têtes Raides are featured on "Le Jour d'avant" and "La Lettre d'explication"
- Neil Hannon – vocals on "Les Jours tristes"
- Marc Sens – guitar on "Le Concert"
- Sophie Naboulay – violin on "La Parade" and "L'Échec"
- Sacha Toorop – drums on "Bagatelle" and "Le Méridien"
- Grégoire Simon – saxophone on "Le Concert"
- Mixed by Ian Caple

== Charts ==
Chart (2001)	Peak position
French Albums Chart	41

== Certifications and sales ==
Region	Certification	Certified units/sales
France (SNEP)	Gold	150,000
Summaries
Worldwide	—	250,000
