= Samuel Contesti =

French-Italian figure skater

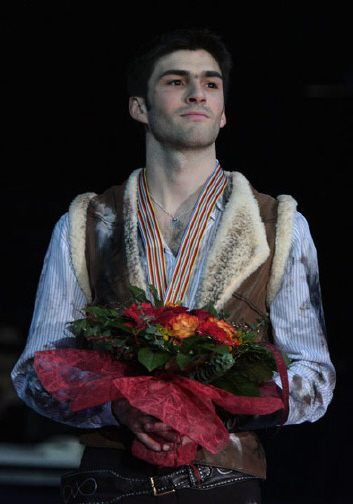
- Contesti at the 2009 European Championships.

Personal information
- Born: 4 March 1983 (age 43) Le Havre, France
- Height: 1.81 m (5 ft 11 1/2 in)

Figure skating career
- Country: Italy
- Skating club: Courmayeur SC
- Began skating: 1987
- Retired: June 15, 2012
Medal record
Representing Italy
Figure skating: Men's singles
European Championships
Silver medal – second place	2009 Helsinki	Men's singles

Samuel Contesti (born 4 March 1983) is a French-Italian former competitive figure skater. He originally competed for France, then switched to Italy after the 2006–07 season. He is the 2009 European silver medalist and a five-time Italian national champion (2008–12).

== Personal life ==
Samuel Contesti's father, Yves, was a professional football player in Ligue 1. He has two older sisters.

Contesti married Géraldine Zulini in February 2007 and their son, Ennio, was born in June 2009. Their second child was born in 2012.

== Career ==
Contesti initially competed for France, placing ninth at the 2005 European Championships and 26th at Worlds the same year. The next season, he placed 5th at Trophée Eric Bompard and 2nd at French Nationals but did not compete at Europeans or Worlds. In autumn 2006, Contesti was assigned to compete at Skate America, however, the French skating federation decided to withdraw his name. In 2007, he won bronze at French Nationals.

Having married an Italian, Contesti began competing for Italy in March 2008. In spring of 2008, he moved to Courmayeur, Italy. By capturing silver at the 2009 European Championships, Contesti became the first male single skater to win a medal for Italy at the event in 55 years, since Carlo Fassi's gold in 1954. At the 2009 World Championships, Contesti placed 5th, his career-best finish at the event.

Contesti confirmed his retirement from competition on 15 June 2012.

== Programs ==
Season	Short program	Free skating	Exhibition
2011–12	Au son de gitare by Antoine Bonelli; Tarantella Napoletana by Linguini Brothers; Hungarian March by Hector Berlioz; La gazza ladra by Gioachino Rossini; 1812 Overture by Pyotr Ilyich Tchaikovsky	"La Vie en rose" by Édith Piaf; Ca gaze by Fony Murena; La Valse à mille temps by Jacques Brel	
2010–11	Hungarian March; La gazza ladra; 1812 Overture	Sikuriadas; Wara Bolivian; Cacharapaya by Panpipes of the Andes	
2009–10	Wish Me Well by Willie Dixon, Memphis Slim; Whammer Jammer by The J. Geils Band	Sikuriadas; Wara Bolivian; Cacharapaya by Panpipes of the Andes	Once Upon a Time in the West by Ennio Morricone; "Cotton-Eyed Joe" by Rednex
2008–09	J'envoie valser by Zazie, Memphis Slim; La Valse des monstres by Yann Tiersen	Once Upon a Time in the West; Cotton-Eyed Joe	"I Won't Dance" by Frank Sinatra
2007–08	Homevid by Riccardo Cervelli	Once Upon a Time in the West by Ennio Morricone	
2006–07	"Don't Let Me Be Misunderstood" (from Kill Bill Vol. 1) by Santa Esmeralda	Once Upon a Time in the West by Ennio Morricone	
2005–06	"Don't Let Me Be Misunderstood" (from Kill Bill Vol. 1) by Santa Esmeralda	Schindler's List by John Williams; Mazel by Klezmer	
2004–05	Le Phare by Yann Tiersen	Schindler's List by John Williams; Mazel by Klezmer	
2003–04	Summer of '42	Le jour d'avant by Yann Tiersen	

== Competitive highlights ==
GP: Grand Prix; JGP: Junior Grand Prix

=== For Italy ===
International
Event	07–08	08–09	09–10	10–11	11–12
Olympics			18th		
Worlds		5th	7th	18th	10th
Europeans		2nd	5th	6th	7th
GP Cup of China			4th	6th	
GP Cup of Russia				4th	
GP NHK Trophy					4th
GP Skate America					8th
GP Skate Canada			5th		
Challenge Cup	2nd	1st			3rd
Finlandia Trophy				3rd	
Golden Spin		2nd			
Mont Blanc Trophy			1st	1st	
Nepela Memorial					3rd
NRW Trophy		2nd	2nd	4th	1st
Schäfer Memorial		2nd			
National
Italian Champ.	1st	1st	1st	1st	1st
Team events
World Team Trophy					6th T (9th P)
Japan Open			1st T (5th P)		
T = Team result; P = Personal result; Medals awarded for team result only.

=== For France ===
International
Event	01–02	03–04	04–05	05–06	06–07
Worlds			26th		
Europeans			9th		
GP Bompard			9th	5th	
Bofrost Cup on Ice			4th		
Copenhagen Trophy		1st			
Crystal Skate				3rd	
Gardena	3rd				
Schäfer Memorial		5th			
National
French Champ.	11th	6th	3rd	2nd	3rd
