= Black Session: Yann Tiersen =

Live album by Yann Tiersen
- Released: 2 November 1999
- Recorded: 2 December 1998
- Length: 50:58
- Label: EMI France

Yann Tiersen chronology
Tout est calme (1999)	Black Session: Yann Tiersen (1999)	Amélie (2001)

Black Session: Yann Tiersen is the first live album of French avant-garde musician and composer Yann Tiersen. The live album was recorded by France International on 2 December 1998 as the opening act of the Rencontres Trans Musicales in the Salle Serreau at the Théâtre National de Bretagne in Rennes, for the C'est Lenoir show broadcast on the French public radio station France Inter. It was subsequently mastered by Radio France, and released in CD format one year later on 2 November 1999. The album features Tiersen with Claire Pichet, Dominique A, Northern Irish singer, songwriter, and frontman of the chamber pop group The Divine Comedy Neil Hannon, singer and songwriter Bertrand Cantat of Noir Désir, singer and illustrator Françoiz Breut, anglophone French rock band The Married Monk (Christian Quermalet, Philippe Lebruman, Etienne Jaumet, Nicolas Courret), French folk rock group Têtes Raides (Christian Olivier, Grègoire Simon, Pascal Olivier, Anne-Gaëlle Bisquay, Serge Bégout, Jean-Luc Millot, and Edith Bégou), the string quartet Quatuor à cordes, guitarist and composer Olivier Mellano, and author Mathieu Boogaerts.

== Track listing ==
All songs are written and composed by Yann Tiersen except where noted.

1. "Sur le fil" – 3:07
2. "Geronimo" (Neil Hannon) – 1:56 (Sung by Neil Hannon)
3. "Life on Mars" (David Bowie) – 3:09 (Sung by Neil Hannon)
4. "La Rupture" – 2:44 (Sung by Claire Pichet)
5. "Monochrome" – 3:29 (Sung by Dominique A)
6. "Les Bras de mer" (Dominique A) – 3:07 (Sung by Dominique A)
7. "Roma amor" (The Married Monk) – 4:00 (Sung by Christian Quermalet)
8. "Tout est calme" – 3:27 (Sung by Yann Tiersen)
9. "À ton étoile" (Bertrand Cantat/Noir Désir) – 3:46 (Sung by Bertrand Cantat)
10. "La Crise" – 2:35 (Sung by Claire Pichet)
11. "Les Forges" (Dominique A) – 4:01 (Sung by Françoiz Breut)
12. "La Noyée" – 2:26
13. "Ginette" (Christian Olivier/Les Têtes Raides) – 4:49 (Sung by Christian Olivier)
14. "La Terrasse" – 3:40 (sung by Yann Tiersen)
15. "Bon voyage" (Mathieu Boogaerts) – 2:25 (Sung by Mathieu Boogaerts)
16. "Le Quartier" – 2:17

== Personnel ==
- Yann Tiersen
- Christian Quermalet is featured on tracks 2, 3, 4, 5, 6, 7, 8, 9, 10, 11, 14, and 16
- Quatuor à cordes are featured on tracks 2, 3, 6, 7, 8, 9, and 11
- The Married Monk are featured on tracks 5, 6, 7, 8, 9, 10, 11, and 14
- Olivier Mellano is featured on "La Crise"
- Les Têtes Raides are featured on "La Noyée" and "Ginette"
