= Yann Tiersen =

French musician and composer (born 1970)

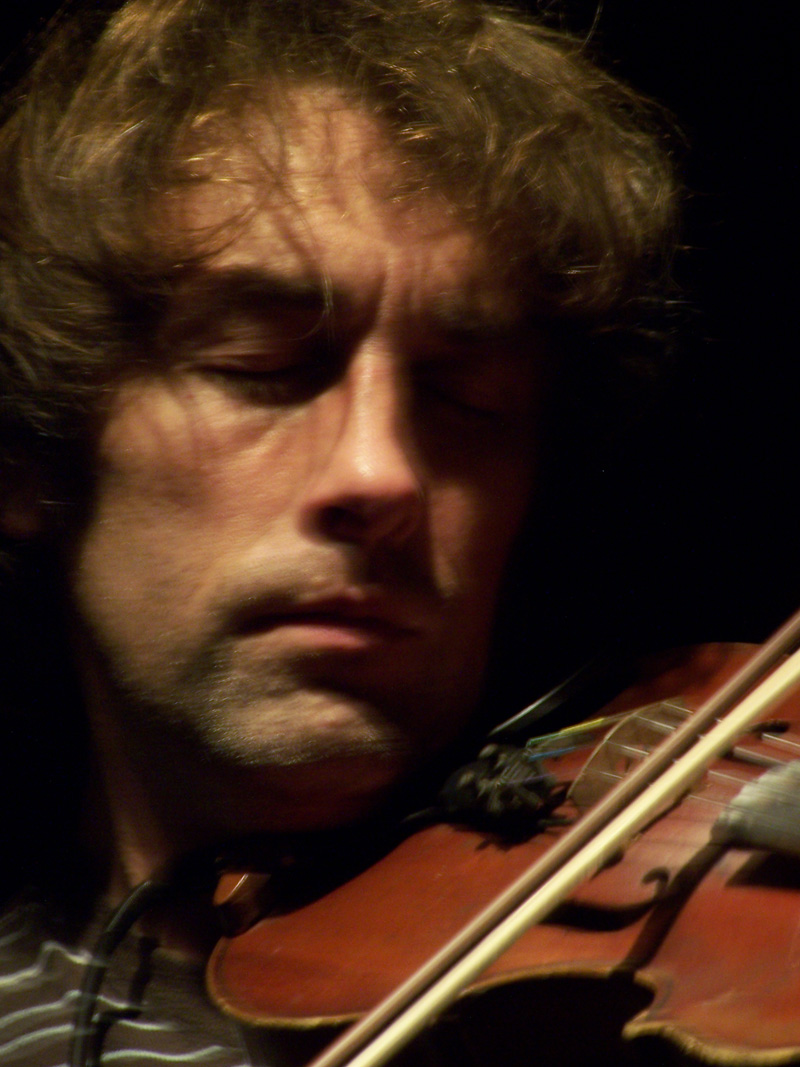
- Tiersen in 2007

Background information
- Born: Yann Pierre Tiersen; 23 June 1970 (age 56); Brest, Brittany, France
- Genres: Minimal rock; avant-garde rock; post-rock; folk rock; bal-musette
- Occupations: Musician; songwriter
- Instruments: Piano; violin; piano accordion; electric guitar; toy piano; vocals
- Years active: 1995–present
- Labels: Sine Terra Firma; Ici, d'ailleurs...; EMI; Virgin; Mute; ANTI-
- Website: yanntiersen.com

Yann Pierre Tiersen (born 23 June 1970) is a French musician and composer from Brittany. His musical career is split between studio recordings, music collaborations, and film soundtracks songwriting. His music incorporates a large variety of classical and contemporary instruments, primarily the electric guitar, the piano, synthesisers, and the violin, but he also includes instruments such as the melodica, xylophone, toy piano, harpsichord, piano accordion, and even a typewriter.

Tiersen is often mistaken for a soundtrack composer; he himself states that "I'm not a composer and I really don't have a classical background," but his real focus is on touring and recording studio albums, which are often used for film soundtracks. Tracks taken from his first three studio albums were used for the soundtrack of the 2001 French film Amélie.

== Biography and career ==
=== The early years: 1970–1992 ===
Tiersen was born in 1970 in Brest, in the department of Finistère, part of Brittany in northwestern France, into a French family of Belgian and Norwegian origins. He started learning to play the piano at the age of four, the violin at the age of six, and received classical training at several musical academies, including those in Rennes, Nantes, and Boulogne-sur-Mer. In the early 1980s, he was influenced as a teenager by the punk subculture, and bands including the Stooges, Joy Division, and OMD. When he was 13, he broke his violin, bought an electric guitar, and formed a rock band. Tiersen was living in Rennes back then, home to the three-day music festival Rencontres Trans Musicales, which is held annually in December. That gave him the opportunity to see acts like Nirvana, Einstürzende Neubauten, Nick Cave and the Bad Seeds, the Cramps, Television, and Suicide. A few years later, when his band parted, Tiersen bought a cheap mixing desk, an 8-track reel-to-reel tape recorder, and started recording music on his own with a synthesiser, a sampler, and a drum machine.

=== Debut and national acclaim: 1993–2000 ===
Let's live in an enormous world of sound we can use randomly, with no rules at all. Let's play with sound, forget all knowledge and instrumental skills, and just use instinct — the same way punk did.

— Yann Tiersen

Before releasing film scores under his own name, Tiersen recorded background music for a number of plays and short films. During the summer of 1993, Tiersen stayed in his apartment with an electric guitar, a violin and a piano accordion, recording music on his own; he was guided by what he calls "a musical anarchic vision". By the end of the summer, Tiersen had recorded over forty tracks, which would most be used later on for his first two albums. Tiersen's debut album, La Valse des monstres, limited to 1,000 copies, was first released in June 1995 by independent record label Sine Terra Firma, and then reissued by Nancy-based record label Ici d'ailleurs in 1998 as the second album of its catalogue. The 17-track-album was inspired by and written for the theatrical adaptations of Tod Browning's 1932 cult classic Freaks, and Yukio Mishima's 1955 version of Noh play The Damask Drum. In April 1996, one year later, he released Rue des cascades, a collection of short pieces recorded with a toy piano, a harpsichord, a violin, a piano accordion, and a mandolin. The title track, sung by French solo singer Claire Pichet, was used the following year for the Palme d'Or nominated French drama film The Dreamlife of Angels, and several tracks received greater exposure when they were featured on the Jean-Pierre Jeunet's film Amélie, five years later. Tiersen usually plays most of the music instruments himself during both studio recording sessions and his live sets; he has won theatrical appeal as a one-man show and was invited to play, among others, at the 1996 edition of the Avignon Festival, the oldest live arts festival in France.

I was amazed with the way the lighthouse rays revealed some hidden details of the land, how we can rediscover something we have in front of us everyday, only thanks to a light pointing at it.

— Yann Tiersen

Tiersen rose to domestic fame upon the release of his third studio album, Le Phare (The Lighthouse), in 1998. The album was recorded in self-imposed seclusion on the isle of Ushant (Breton: Enez Eusa, French: Ouessant) at the end of the English Channel which marks the most north-western point of territorial France. Tiersen spent two months there, living in a rented house. At night-time, he would watch the Phare du Creach, one of the most powerful lighthouses in the world, and was fascinated by the stunning scenery repeated every night. Le Phare, which featured Claire Pichet, French singer and songwriter Dominique A, and Belgian drummer and percussionist Sacha Toorop, sold over 160,000 copies, confirming Tiersen's status as one of the most innovative artists of his generation and commencing a run of successful albums. Three songs from this album, "La Dispute", "La Noyée" and "Sur le fil" were later featured on the 2001 soundtrack Amélie, while "L'Homme aux bras ballants", written and composed by Dominique A, was also featured on Laurent Gorgiard's 1997 short animation soundtrack of the same name. Its single "Monochrome", sung by Dominique A, was a radio hit and propelled the album into the charts. Le Phare was his first album to climb to number 50 in the French Albums Chart.

During that period, Tiersen provided a new arrangement and played strings, vibraphone, bell, the mandolin, the electric guitar and bass guitar for the song "À ton étoile" by French rock band Noir Désir which was featured on their 1998 remix album One Trip/One Noise. He recorded songs for the soundtrack of several films, including the award-winning and multi-nominated film The Dreamlife of Angels (French: La Vie rêvée des anges) (1998), André Téchiné's Alice et Martin (1998) and Christine Carrière's Qui plume la lune? (1999). Tiersen also recorded Bästard ~ Yann Tiersen, a three-track-extended-play released in 1998 in collaboration with French electronic rock band Bästard, and his first live album, Black Session: Yann Tiersen. The live album was recorded on 2 December 1998 as he played the opening act of the Rencontres Trans Musicales in the Salle Serreau at the Théâtre National de Bretagne in Rennes, for the C'est Lenoir French broadcast show on the public radio station France Inter. The album features the chamber pop group The Divine Comedy fronted by Northern Irish singer and songwriter Neil Hannon, the French rock band Noir Désir with singer and songwriter Bertrand Cantat, singer and illustrator Françoiz Breut, French rock band The Married Monk (Christian Quermalet, Philippe Lebruman, Etienne Jaumet, Nicolas Courret), French folk rock group Les Têtes Raides (Christian Olivier, Grègoire Simon, Pascal Olivier, Anne-Gaëlle Bisquay, Serge Bégout, Jean-Luc Millot, and Edith Bégou), the string quartet Quatuor à cordes, guitarist and composer Olivier Mellano, and author Mathieu Boogaerts, as well as his usual collaborators and friends, Claire Pichet and Dominique A. The album was recorded by France International, mastered by Radio France, and released in CD format one year later on 2 November 1999.

In 1999, Tiersen together with The Married Monk, Claire Pichet, and Olivier Mellano released his first collaboration album, Tout est calme. The 26 minutes, 10 tracks mini album peaked at number 45 on the French Albums Chart. The album produced one single, "Les Grandes marées", and Tiersen also featured on The Divine Comedy's single "Gin Soaked Boy" released on that same year, on three tracks for Françoiz Breut's second studio album Vingt à Trente Mille Jours (English: Twenty to Thirty Thousand Days), and on Têtes Raides' Gratte-poil, both released in 2000.

=== Amélie and global recognition: 2001–2009 ===
The hard part was making a selection, because all his tracks worked with the film's images!

— Jean-Pierre Jeunet

Tiersen remained relatively unknown outside France until the release of his score for the acclaimed film Amélie (Original French title: Le Fabuleux Destin d'Amélie Poulain, English: The Fabulous Destiny of Amélie Poulain) in 2001. French film director Jean-Pierre Jeunet had something else in mind for the film score, but one day one of his production assistants put on a CD of Tiersen, and the director found it absolutely superb. Jeunet bought all of Tiersen's albums, and then contacted him to see if the Breton composer was interested in writing the film score for Amélie. In two weeks, Tiersen composed nineteen pieces for the film and also allowed the production to take anything they wanted from his other records. Amélie received great critical acclaim and was a box-office success. The film went on to win the Best Film award at the European Film Awards, four César Awards, including Best Film and Best Director, two BAFTA Awards, including Best Original Screenplay, and was nominated for five Academy Awards. The soundtrack was a mixture of both new and previously released material, and Tiersen was also the recipient of the César Award for Best Music Written for a Film, and of the World Soundtrack Academy award. The soundtrack album charted in many countries, including the number one position on the French Albums Chart.

While he was writing the film score for Amélie, Tiersen was also preparing his fifth studio album L'Absente. The album was characterized by several contributions including 35-member Ensemble Orchestral Synaxis conducted by Guillaume Bourgogne, viola player Bertrand Lambert, violinists Yann Bisquay and Sophie Naboulay, Natacha Régnier, and saxophonist Grégoire Simon, and long-time collaborators Dominique A, Christine Ott, Lisa Germano, Neil Hannon, Têtes Raides, Christian Quermalet, Marc Sens, and Sacha Toorop. The album, which was released on 5 June 2001 through EMI France, was preceded by two promotional singles for "A quai" and "Bagatelle" respectively. Tiersen provided strings and vibraphone to two tracks, "Roma Amor" and "Holidays", featured on R/O/C/K/Y, the third studio album by The Married Monk.

At this time he was married to Belgian actress Natacha Régnier, co-star of The Dreamlife of Angels. Régnier became a singer and Tiersen wrote three songs for her including his arrangement of Georges Brassens' "Le Parapluie", a song featured on the tribute album Les Oiseaux de passage, released in 2001. That same year they toured in France and abroad. They have a daughter, Lise, born in 2002, but Tiersen and Régnier have since divorced. In this period, Tiersen also took his music out around the world, playing shows with a full orchestra and an amplified string quartet. From 15 to 17 February 2002, Tiersen with many of the collaborators who participated in the recording sessions for L'Absente plus Claire Pichet, violinists Nicolas Stevens and Renaud Lhoest, bassist Jean-François Assy, viola player Olivier Tilkin, and uilleann pipes, bagpipes, and low whistle player Ronan Le Bars, performed live at the Cité de la Musique (City of Music) in Paris. Part of these three concerts went on to form Tiersen's second live album C'était ici (It Was Here), which was released through EMI France on 30 September 2002.

Tiersen's skills as a composer of film scores were much in demand, and the soundtrack for Amélie was soon followed by the film score for Good Bye, Lenin!, a 2003 German Tragicomedy film directed by Wolfgang Becker. The film was both a commercial and a critical success and won several awards including the César Award for Best Film from the European Union, Best Film at the European Film Awards, the German Film Awards for Outstanding Film, Best European Film at the Goya Awards, Best Foreign Language Film for the London Film Critics' Circle, and it was also listed in the Empire magazine 2010's list of "The 100 Best Films of World Cinema". Tiersen was the recipient of the German Film Awards for Outstanding Music. On 15 November 2003, Tiersen with Stuart A. Staples, the lead singer of indie band Tindersticks, actress and singer Jane Birkin, singer and songwriter Christophe Miossec, and Dominique A released 3 titres inédits au profit de la FIDH (3 New Tracks for the Benefit of FIDH), a three-track CD that was part of the On Aime, On Aide benefit collection for raising funds for the International Federation for Human Rights (FIDH).

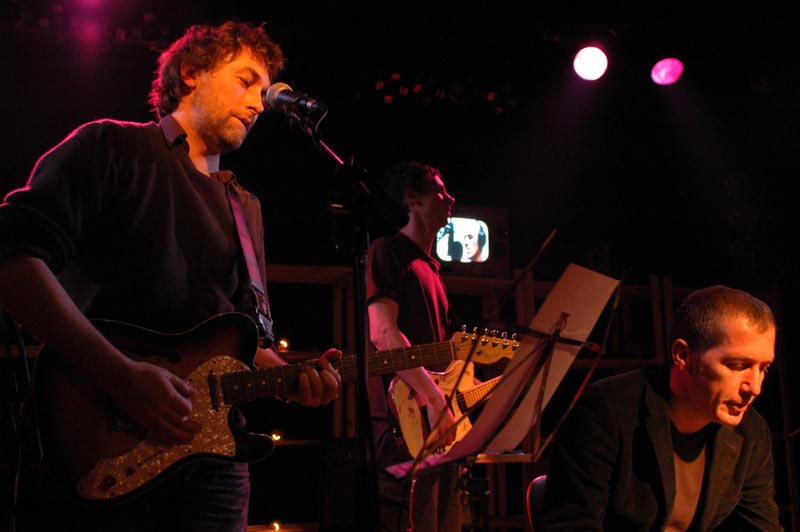
Yann Tiersen (left) and Christophe Miossec (right) at Cabaret Vauban, Brest, France, 6 February 2005.

Tiersen's list of collaborators continued to grow album after album and in October 2004 he released Yann Tiersen & Shannon Wright, a collaboration album with American singer-songwriter Shannon Wright, and, in the same year, he is featured on The Divine Comedy's album Absent Friends. In 2005, Tiersen released his fifth studio album Les Retrouvailles. The album features several collaborators including the Orchestre National de Paris, singers Elizabeth Fraser, Jane Birkin, Stuart A. Staples, Dominique A, and Miossec, strings players Jean-François Assy, Frederic Dessus, Guillaume Fontanarosa, Bertrand Causse, Anne Causse Biragnet, Armelle Legoff, Frédéric Haffner, flute player Elliott, drummer Ludovic Morillon, and ondes Martenot player Christine Ott. Les Retrouvailles also includes a DVD short film entitled La Traversée, directed by Aurélie du Boys, which documents the making of the album in Ushant, and incorporates an animated video for the non-album track "Le Train" and live versions of a handful of songs. The album produced a single, "Kala", sung by Elizabeth Fraser, and Tiersen also played piano on Staples' solo debut album, Lucky Dog Recordings 03-04. The subsequent world tour of 2006 replaced the multi-instrumental ensemble with electric guitars and an ondes Martenot, and produced his third live album, On Tour, which was released together with a DVD, directed by Aurélie du Boys, about the tour, in November 2006. In 2006, he also released two singles, "La Mancha" and "La Rade", and he was featured on The Endless Rise of the Sun, the third studio album by electronic group Smooth, Raides à la ville extended play by Katel, and 13m^{2} by David Delabrosse.

After a five-year absence as a composer of film scores, Tiersen provided the background music for Tabarly, a 2008 documentary film by Pierre Marcel about the French sailor, two-time champion of the Single-Handed Trans-Atlantic Race, and father of French yachting Éric Tabarly. The documentary was released in June 2008, exactly ten years after Tabarly's death. Éric Tabarly was lost on the night of 12–13 June 1998 in the Irish Sea when he was struck by a gaff of his Pen Duick during heavy swell and knocked overboard from his yacht near Wales while on his way to the Fife Regatta in Scotland. His body was recovered five weeks later off the coast of Ireland by a French fishing trawler. The documentary, narrated by Tabarly himself, traces his sporting career until his last meal in Ushant. Before the end of the decade, Tiersen also contributed to Christine Ott's debut solo album Solitude Nomade, and to Miossec's seventh studio album Finistériens.

=== Dust Lane and Skyline: 2010–present ===
The name Dust Lane partly came from the image of the dirt road going into Gaza.

— Yann Tiersen

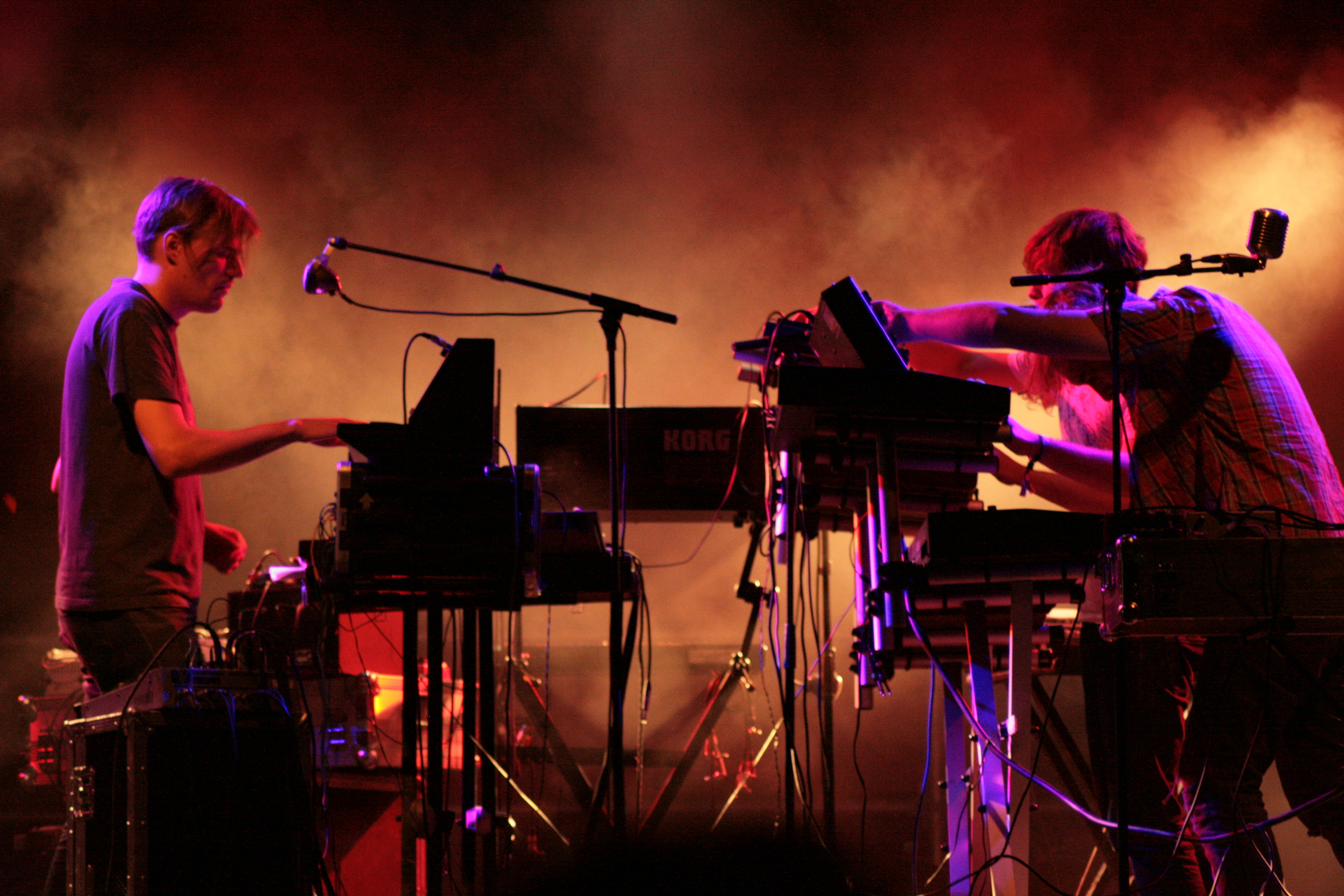
Elektronische Staubband [Lionel Laquerriere (left), and Yann Tiersen and Thomas Poli (right)] at Lazzaretto of Ancona, Italy, 21 July 2011.

October 2010 saw the release of Tiersen's sixth studio album titled Dust Lane. The album was two years in the making and was largely recorded in Ushant, France. Further parts were recorded in the Philippines. The album is preoccupied with mortality; during the recording sessions Tiersen lost his mother and a close friend. The recordings started out as simple song based tracks with Tiersen playing acoustic guitar, mandolin and bouzouki. New layers were added to the recordings creating a more complex sound. Then an array of vintage synthesisers and electric guitars were added to create further textures. The album was released by Mute Records in Europe and ANTI- Records in the US. The record was promoted in a tour beginning in October 2010, starting in New York City. Dust Lane was preceded by the release of the vinyl EP PALESTINE and by the single for "Ashes". In 2010, Tiersen also contributed to the tribute album to cross-genre, experimental music group Coil The Dark Age of Love by This Immortal Coil, a one-off tribute formation, and to Li(f)e, the fourth solo studio album by hip-hop artist Sage Francis.

October 2011 saw the European release of his seventh studio album, Skyline. The nine-track album, a follow on from his Dust Lane, was once again recorded at Tiersen's home on the island of Ushant in the south-western end of the English Channel, with further parts recorded in Paris, San Francisco, Berlin, and Nashville. It was subsequently mixed by producer Ken Thomas in Leeds, and mastered by Ray Staff in London. The album produced the singles for "Monuments" and "I'm Gonna Live Anyhow". On 18 February 2012, Tiersen with Lionel Laquerriere, and Thomas Poli, presented his side project, Elektronische Staubband, at La Route du Rock music festival in Saint-Malo. It was about an hour of krautrock, electronic, and experimental music involving a dozen of synthesizers and analog keyboards with the first three pieces of the set list taken from Dust Lane and the remaining five from Skyline. Tiersen was also chosen by Jeff Mangum of Neutral Milk Hotel to perform at the All Tomorrow's Parties festival in March 2012 in Minehead, England. Skyline was released in North America via ANTI- Records on 17 April 2012, and it was followed by the Skyline Tour with dates in the United States, Canada, Iceland, Spain, Portugal, France, Slovak Republic, Austria, Finland and the United Kingdom.

On 3 August 2016, it was announced that Tiersen married Emilie Quinquis in Ushant, Brittany. Quinquis stated that she and Tiersen were married on 31 July 2016. On 6 April 2017 the couple had a son.

== Music ==
=== Styles and instruments ===
[There is] no frontier between classical music and popular music, you are free to work with whatever you want. For me it’s natural to use lots of different instruments and textures and sounds and noises because life is like that.

— Yann Tiersen

I didn’t know French musette music at all. Even people like Jacques Brel — I discovered Brel through Scott Walker. My parents listened to Brel, of course, but when you’re a teenager you’re not interested. So it was only when I heard Scott Walker's versions that I thought "this is fucking good", you know. The only French singer I listened to was Serge Gainsbourg.

— Yann Tiersen

Tiersen's music is influenced by the classical training he received as a child, by American and British punk subculture, and by the music he used to listen to as a teenager. His musical style is deceptively easy to recognize but difficult to define. It varies greatly from one album to another and with time. His melancholic music and composing techniques mix classical and folk music elements with pop and rock ones. His delicate but deeply emotional style has been linked to Frédéric Chopin and the other great masters of Romantic music, and also to Erik Satie, the colourful figure of the early 20th century Parisian avant-garde whose work was a precursor to later artistic movements such as minimalism, repetitive music, and the Theatre of the Absurd. Tiersen is also compared to one of the most influential composers of the late 20th century, the American minimalism, classical–contemporary classical, and ambient music composer Philip Glass, and to British minimalist music composer, pianist, librettist and musicologist Michael Nyman, known for the many film scores he wrote during his lengthy career and who is the reason for Tiersen to be often called the Gallic Michael Nyman.

I couldn’t play a brass instrument — I tried but I was really bad at it — I couldn’t play the flute, but the piano accordion was a keyboard so it was easy for me.

— Yann Tiersen

Tiersen started playing the piano and the violin at a young age. In 1983, at the age of thirteen, he broke his violin and bought an electric guitar. Tiersen only returned to his beginnings instrument years later, after searching for string sounds to sample. For his music albums, Tiersen composes and makes arrangements incorporating many instruments, including keyboards such as the piano, electric piano, Fender Rhodes, organs, harpsichord, Bontempi and toy pianos, Korg and Moog synthesizers, Mellotron, piano accordions and melodica, strings as the violin, viola, violone and the cello, different types of electric, acoustic or bass guitars, mandolin, banjo, ukulele, bouzouki and oud, brasses, like horns, and woodwind instruments such as the saxophone, clarinet, bassoon, pipe, oboe and the flute, percussions like drums, vibraphone, marimba, tubular bells, tom drum, cymbal, glockenspiel and tam-tam, or the sounds produced by Leslie speaker, music box, carillons, typewriters, cooking vessels, chairs, a car or a bicycle wheel. Tiersen also plays many of these instruments himself either in the studio or on a live set.

=== Film scores ===
Tiersen's ability to compose music that can be easily used for film scores was evident from the beginning. All tracks from his debut album, La Valse des monstres, were conceived for stage adaptations and plays. The title track of his second album, Rue des cascades, was used for The Dreamlife of Angels by Erick Zonca, and several tracks from both albums plus three songs from Le Phare are featured on the soundtrack to Jean-Pierre Jeunet's film Amélie. Another track form Le Phare, "L'Homme aux bras ballants", is the soundtrack to a short animation film by Laurent Gorgiard. Tiersen's pieces are also featured on Alice et Martin by André Téchiné, and Qui plume la lune? by Christine Carrière.

Following the box-office success of Amélie, Tiersen's skills as a composer of film scores were much in demand, and this led him to compose the music for Good Bye, Lenin! by Wolfgang Becker. Although the soundtrack for Amélie consisted mainly of pieces that Tiersen had previously released on his first two albums, the soundtrack for Good Bye, Lenin! was conceived from scratch, except for "Comptine d'un autre été : L'après-midi", which is also featured on Amélie's soundtrack.

Tiersen returned to making film soundtracks in 2008 after a years-long break, creating the score for a documentary about the sailor Éric Tabarly.

=== Collaborations ===
Tiersen has always composed his music in solitude, starting from simple melodies to which he added subsequent layers. His first album, La Valse des monstres, is almost entirely performed by him alone playing all the instruments, with the exception of "Quimper 94" and "Le Banquet" with drums and charleston provided by Laurent Heudes. His second album, Rue des cascades, saw the participation of French soloist singer Claire Pichet, who provided vocals on two tracks on the album, "Rue des cascades" and "Naomi", and François-Xavier Schweyer, who played cello on "C'était ici" and "La Fenêtre". Le Phare saw his first collaboration with French singer and songwriter Dominique A. Claire Pichet and drummer Sacha Toorop are also featured on this album, but both albums can be considered as a one-man works.

It is at this point in his career, around the end of the nineties, that his collaborations begin to grow. In 1997, he collaborated with French rock band Noir Désir, the following year Tiersen and Dominique A released the single for "Monochrome", and, in collaboration with French electronic rock band Bästard, the EP Bästard ~ Yann Tiersen, while 1999 saw the releases of Tout est calme, a collaboration mini album by Yann Tiersen, The Married Monk, Claire Pichet, and Olivier Mellano, and of his first live album, Black Session: Yann Tiersen. The live album, recorded in December 1998, features Tiersen with Claire Pichet, Dominique A, The Divine Comedy's singer and songwriter Neil Hannon, Noir Désir's singer and songwriter Bertrand Cantat, singer and illustrator Françoiz Breut, anglophone French rock band The Married Monk, French folk rock group Têtes Raides, the string quartet Quatuor à cordes, guitarist and composer Olivier Mellano, and author Mathieu Boogaerts. The soundtrack for Amélie saw for the first time the introduction of a full orchestra, the 35-member Ensemble Orchestral Synaxis, and of an ondes Martenot played by Christine Ott. Both will participate in the recording sessions for his next album, L'Absente, which also includes American singer-songwriter and multi-instrumentalist Lisa Germano, Belgian actress and singer Natacha Régnier, Neil Hannon, and Têtes Raides, among others.

Tiersen's list of collaborators continues to grow. His second live album, C'était ici, recorded during three concerts performed in February 2002 at the Cité de la Musique in Paris, features more than 50 musicians. Yann Tiersen & Shannon Wright, a collaboration album with American singer and songwriter Shannon Wright, was released in October 2004, and his 2005 album, Les Retrouvailles, features vocals from Stuart Staples of Tindersticks, English actress and singer Jane Birkin, Breton singer and songwriter Miossec, Elizabeth Fraser, the vocalist for the pioneer alternative rock group Cocteau Twins, and the Orchestre National de Paris. The subsequent world tour produced his third live album On Tour, which replaced the multi-instrumental ensemble of Les Retrouvailles with a more rock-oriented sound. The soundtrack to Tabarly saw Tiersen return to minimalism, in fact most of the compositions featured on the album are for solo piano. But his two subsequent albums return to have a rock-oriented sound, with the only difference that Skyline has a higher number of contributors than Dust Lane.

Tiersen has contributed, either in part or in full, to the realization of several records among which stand out "Gin Soaked Boy" and Absent Friends by The Divine Comedy, Vingt à Trente Mille Jours by Françoiz Breut, Lucky Dog Recordings 03-04 by Stuart A. Staples, and Li(f)e by Sage Francis, as well as records by Noir Désir, Têtes Raides, The Married Monk, French electronic trio Smooth, Katel, David Delabrosse, Christine Ott, or Miossec. In 2011, Tiersen, with Lionel Laquerriere and Thomas Poli, has also started Elektronische Staubband, a side project on electronic music. This new project is expected to lead to the release of a new album in 2013.

=== Charity work ===
In 2011, Tiersen collaborated with the Yellow Bird Project (YBP) to design a t-shirt, which was sold to raise money for Médecins Sans Frontières (MSF). The main reason he chose to support MSF, is for their work as one of the three charities helping refugees in Libya at the time. A live video session was also filmed in the MSF London offices to promote the T-shirt and raise awareness for the cause.

== Discography ==
=== Studio albums ===
Year	Album	Peak chart positions			
Year	Album	FRA	BEL (Fl)	BEL (Wa)	SWI
1995	La Valse des monstres: Featured performer: Laurent Heudes	139	—	—	—
1996	Rue des cascades: Featured performers: Claire Pichet, François-Xavier Schweyer	51	—	—	—
1998	Le Phare: Featured performers: Claire Pichet, Dominique A, Sacha Toorop	50	—	—	—
2001	L'Absente: Featured performers: Christine Ott, Ensemble Orchestral Synaxis, Lisa Germano, Anne-Gaëlle Bisquay, Bertrand Lambert, Yann Bisquay, Natacha Régnier, Dominique A, Christian Quermalet, Têtes Raides, Neil Hannon, Marc Sens, Sophie Naboulay, Sacha Toorop, Grégoire Simon	8	—	—	—
2005	Les Retrouvailles: Featured performers: Orchestre National de Paris, Elizabeth Fraser, Jane Birkin, Stuart A. Staples, Dominique A, Miossec, Jean-François Assy, Frederic Dessus, Guillaume Fontanarosa, Bertrand Causse, Anne Causse Biragnet, Armelle Legoff, Frédéric Haffner, Christine Ott, Elliott, Ludovic Morillon	6	96	40	48
2010	Dust Lane: Featured performers: Matt Elliott, Gaëlle Kerrien, Syd Matters, Dave Collingwood	36	96	97	—
2011	Skyline: Featured performers: Dave Collingwood, Stéphane Bouvier, Gaëlle Kerrien, Matt Elliott, Syd Matters, Lionel Laquerrière, Neil Turpin, Robin Allender, Stéphane Bouvier, Ólavur Jákupsson, Daniel James, Efterklang, Heather Woods, Peter Broderick	172	—	—	—
2014	∞ (aka Infinity)	104	102	101	—
2016	EUSA	21	67	38	76
2019	All	66	63	116	50
2019	Portrait	94	—	124	—
2021	Kerber	97	—	71	—
2022	11 5 18 2 5 18	—	—	—	—
2025	Rathlin from a Distance	—	—	—	—
"—" denotes releases that did not chart or were not released in that country.

=== Soundtracks ===
Year	Album	Peak chart positions						
Year	Album	FRA	AUT	BEL (Fl)	BEL (Wa)	NL	SWI	US (Note: Billboard Top World Music Albums)
2001	Amélie: Featured performers: Ensemble Orchestral Synaxis, Christine Ott, Christian Quermalet.	1	35	3	28	31	2	2
2003	Good Bye Lenin!: Featured performers: Ensemble Orchestral Synaxis, Claire Pichet.	49	—	—	—	—	—	—
2008	Tabarly: Featured performers: Marc Sens, Christine Ott.	122	—	—	—	—	—	—
"—" denotes releases that did not chart or were not released in that country.

=== Live albums ===
Year	Album	Peak chart positions	
Year	Album	FRA	SWI
1999	Black Session: Yann Tiersen: Black Session radio performance; Featured performers: Christian Quermalet, Quatuor à cordes, The Married Monk, Olivier Mellano, Têtes Raides	—	—
2002	C'était ici: Live compilation album; Featured performers: Christian Quermalet, Ensemble Orchestral Synaxis, Quatuor à cordes, Christine Ott, Marc Sens, Claire Pichet, Têtes Raides, Ronan Le Bars, Jean-François Assy, Dominique A, Iso	8	64
2006	On Tour: Featured performers: Marc Sens, Grégoire Simon, Diam's, Katel, Elizabeth Fraser, DD La Fleur, Christine Ott, Stéphane Bouvier, Ludovic Morillon	160	—
"—" denotes releases that did not chart or were not released in that country.

=== Singles and EPs ===
Charting

Year	Single	Peak chart positions					Certifications	Album
Year	Single	FRA	AUT	BEL (Fl)	BEL (Wa)	SWI	Certifications	Album
2013	"Comptine d'un autre été : L'après-midi"	187	41	—	—	34	BPI: Gold	Amélie (soundtrack)
2016	"Porz goret"	181	—	—	—	—		EUSA

Others

- Rue des cascades (7" vinyl EP) (1996)
- Black Session (EP promo) (1998)
- "La vie rêvée des anges" (CD single) (1998)
- "Les grandes marées" (1999)
- "Comptine d'un autre été : L'après-midi" (2001)
- "À quai" (CD single promo) (2001)
- "Bagatelle" (CD maxi promo) (2001)
- 3 titres inédits au profit de la FIDH (part of the On Aime, On Aide collection, composed to raise funds for the FIDH, sold exclusively at Fnac) (2003)
- "Kala" (2005)
- "La mancha" (2006)
- "La rade" (2006)
- Palestine (vinyl EP) (2010)
- "Ashes" (2010)
- "Monuments" (2011)
- "I'm Gonna Live Anyhow" (2011)

=== Collaborations ===
Year	Record	FR (Note: Peak chart positions)
1998	"Monochrome": Single by Yann Tiersen and Dominique A; reissued in 2002.	—
1998	Bästard ~ Tiersen: EP by Bästard and Yann Tiersen.	—
1999	Tout est calme: Mini album by Yann Tiersen, The Married Monk, Claire Pichet and Olivier Mellano.	45
2004	Yann Tiersen & Shannon Wright: Album by Yann Tiersen and Shannon Wright.	60
2010	The Dark Age of Love: Tribute album to Coil by This Immortal Coil.; This Immortal Coil: Yann Tiersen, Yaël Naim, Bonnie Prince Billy, Matt Elliott, DAAU, Chapelier Fou, Sylvain Chauveau, Christine Ott, Oktopus, Nightwood, David Donatien and Nicolas Jorio.	—
2015	ESB: Analog synth album recorded in Tiersen's studio with Lionel Laquerrière and Thomas Poli. Styled as "E S B", formerly "Elektronische Staubband".	—
"—" denotes releases that did not chart or were not released in that country.

=== Contributions ===
- One Trip/One Noise (by Noir Désir) (1998)
  - "À ton étoile" (arrangements, strings, vibraphone, bell, mandolin, electric guitar and bass)
- "Gin Soaked Boy" (by The Divine Comedy) (1999)
- Vingt à Trente Mille Jours (by Françoiz Breut) (2000)
  - "Porsmouth" (vibraphone), "Vingt à trente mille jours" (vibraphone), "L'heure bleue" (violin), "Le verre pilé" (vibraphone); arrangements
- Gratte-poil (by Têtes Raides) (2000)
  - "Cabaret des nues" (violin)
- R/O/C/K/Y (by The Married Monk) (2001)
  - "Roma Amor" (strings, vibraphone), "Holidays" (strings), and "Cyro's Request" (vibraphone)
- Les oiseaux de passage (tribute to Georges Brassens) (2001)
  - cover of "Le parapluie" with Natacha Régnier
- Absent Friends (by The Divine Comedy) (2004)
  - "Sticks & Stones" (accordion); "Anthem for Bored Youth" (accordion), a track appearing only on the French limited edition
- The Belgian Kick (by The Married Monk) (2004)
  - viola on "Love Commander" and "Totally Confused"
- Lucky Dog Recordings 03-04 (by Stuart A. Staples) (2005)
  - "She Don't Have to Be Good to Me" (piano)
- The Endless Rise of the Sun (by Smooth) (2006)
  - "The Endless Rise of the Sun" (keyboards)
- Raides à la ville (by Katel) (2006)
  - "La Vielle" (violin)
- 13m^{2} (by David Delabrosse) (2006)
  - production and arrangements
- Solitude Nomade (by Christine Ott) (2009)
  - "Pensées sauvages" (violin)
- Finistériens (by Miossec) (2009)
  - music and arrangements
- Li(f)e (by Sage Francis) (2010)
  - production and arrangements on "The Best of Times"
- Soyons désinvoltes, n'ayons l'air de rien (2×CD+DVD Deluxe edition) (by Noir Désir) (2011)
  - "À ton étoile (Yann Tiersen Mix)" (arrangements, strings, vibraphone, carillon, mandolin, bass, and electric guitar)

=== DVDs ===
Year	Title	Director	Description
2005	La Traversée	Aurélie du Boys	Documentary about the recording and composition of Les Retrouvailles in Ouessant.
2006	On Tour	Aurélie du Boys	Documentary about the world tour of 2006. Featured performers: Marc Sens, Grégoire Simon, Diam's, Katel, Elizabeth Fraser, DD La Fleur, Christine Ott, Stéphane Bouvier, Ludovic Morillon.
