= Tabarly (soundtrack) =

Soundtrack album by Yann Tiersen
- Released: 16 June 2008
- Recorded: 2008
- Genre: Film score, Minimal music
- Length: 33:46
- Label: EMI, Virgin, Ici d'ailleurs
- Producer: Yann Tiersen

Yann Tiersen chronology
On Tour (2006)	Tabarly (2008)	Palestine EP (2010)

Tabarly is the original soundtrack album of the documentary film of the same title. It is composer Yann Tiersen's first soundtrack since 2003's Good Bye Lenin! and first studio album since 2005's Les Retrouvailles. The album was recorded in Ushant and at Qu'en reste-t-il? studio in Paris, mixed at Davout studios in Paris, mastered at Loud Mastering, and released through Virgin Records and EMI France in CD format on 16 July 2008. A special edition consisting of a CD plus an LP record was released through Ici, d'ailleurs... record label.

The documentary film, directed by Pierre Marcel, tells the story of the French sailor, two-time champion of the Single-Handed Trans-Atlantic Race, and father of French yachting Éric Tabarly. It was released in June 2008 exactly ten years after his death. Éric Tabarly was lost at Irish Sea when struck by a gaff of his Pen Duick during heavy swell and knocked overboard from his yacht near Wales while on his way to the Fife Regatta in Scotland. His body was recovered five weeks later off the coast of Ireland by a French fishing trawler. The documentary, narrated by Tabarly himself, traces his sporting career until his last meal in Ushant.

This soundtrack would not exactly mark a departure from his previous work in films, but it does demonstrate a more restrained taste. Tiersen's abilities as pianist and guitarist are showcased throughout the album. On tracks like "Au-dessous du volcan" and ".IV" Tiersen demonstrates a singular appreciation for the guitar. The tracks "Tabarly" and "Point Zéro" are mirror images with the latter slowed down and no instrumental back up. It all ends with high strung violin playing and nothing else.

== Track listing ==
All music composed by Yann Tiersen. "Tabarly", "Point zéro", and "Point mort" are variations of "Fanny de Lanninon", a song with lyrics written by Pierre Mac Orlan, and music composed by Marceau Verschueren. The Ici d'ailleurs' LP has the same track listing of the CD with the first seven tracks on its side A, and the remaining eight on the side B.

No.	Title	Instruments	Length
1.	"Tabarly"	• Tiersen – piano, violin	3:05
2.	"Naval"	• Tiersen – piano	3:38
3.	".II"	• Tiersen – piano	1:15
4.	"Au-dessous du volcan"	• Tiersen – electric, acoustic, and slide guitars, bass, marimba, electric piano, violin, viola, cello, cymbal, drums • Marc Sens – electric guitar • Christine Ott – ondes Martenot	3:34
5.	".IV"	• Tiersen – acoustic guitar, ukulele	0:56
6.	"La Longue route"	• Tiersen – piano	2:15
7.	"1976"	• Tiersen – piano, violin, viola, cello, accordion, tubular bells, vibraphone, clarinet, bass clarinet, bassoon, oboe, flute	1:13
8.	"Yellow"	• Tiersen – piano, violin, viola, cello, melodica, toy piano, vibraphone, carillon, bass clarinet, clarinet, bassoon, oboe, flute	2:20
9.	"Point zéro"	• Tiersen – piano	2:38
10.	"La Corde"	• Tiersen – piano	1:19
11.	"8 mm"	• Tiersen – piano	2:45
12.	"Point mort"	• Tiersen – piano	3:38
13.	"Dernière"	• Tiersen – piano	1:32
14.	"Atlantique nord"	• Tiersen – piano	2:38
15.	"Eire"	• Tiersen – violin	1:07
Total length:			33:45

== Personnel ==
Musicians

- Yann Tiersen – piano, violin, electric guitar, acoustic guitar, slide guitar, bass, marimba, electric piano, viola, cello, cymbal, drums, ukulele, accordion, tubular bells, vibraphone, clarinet, bass clarinet, bassoon, oboe, flute, melodica, toy piano, carillon
- Marc Sens – electric guitar
- Christine Ott – ondes Martenot

Production

- Gwen Roujanski – engineer
- Fabrice Laureau – engineer, mixing
- Jonz – mastering
- Aymeric Letoquart – Proo-tools assistant
- Paul Lavergne – executive producer
- Photography – Bernard Deguy, Jean-Pierre Laffont, Pierre Marcel

== Charts ==
Chart (2008)	Peak position
French Albums Chart	122
