= Les Retrouvailles =

Studio album by Yann Tiersen
- Released: 23 May 2005
- Genre: Classical crossover
- Length: 43:33
- Label: Ici, d'ailleurs...
- Producer: Yann Tiersen and Fabrice Laureau

Yann Tiersen chronology
Yann Tiersen & Shannon Wright (2004)	Les Retrouvailles (2005)	On Tour (2006)

Les Retrouvailles is the fifth studio album by French musician Yann Tiersen. Released in 2005 through Ici, d'ailleurs... record label, it features a number of high-profile guest vocalists, both French and Anglophone alike: Christophe Miossec, Dominique A, Elizabeth Fraser (of the Cocteau Twins), Jane Birkin, and Stuart Staples (of the Tindersticks). As is customary with his albums, Tiersen showcases his multi-instrumental skills, which on the album encompasses the accordion, piano, mandolin, and harpsichord, among others.

Les Retrouvailles also includes a DVD featuring a short film entitled La Traversée, directed by Aurelie du Boys, which documents the making of the album and incorporates an animated video for the non-album track, "Le Train," and also live versions of a handful of songs.

== Track listing ==
Music and lyrics written by Yann Tiersen, except where noted.

1. "Western" - 2:23
2. "Kala" (Fraser, Tiersen) - 4:09 (Sung by Elizabeth Fraser)
3. "Loin des villes" - 3:19
4. "La Veillée" - 3:11
5. "Plus d'hiver" - 2:23 (Sung by Jane Birkin)
6. "A ceux qui sont malades par mer calme" - 3:30
7. "A Secret Place" (Staples, Tiersen) - 3:26 (Sung by Stuart A. Staples)
8. "Le Matin" - 1:58
9. "Les Enfants" - 2:00
10. "Le Jour de l'ouverture" (Ané, Miossec, Tiersen) - 3:38 (Sung by Miossec and Dominique A)
11. "La Boulange" - 2:46
12. "La Plage" - 1:57
13. "Mary" - 3:38 (Sung by Elizabeth Fraser)
14. "7:PM" - 2:40
15. "Les Retrouvailles" - 1:30
16. "La Jetée" - 1:05

== Personnel ==
- Yann Tiersen – accordion, alto saxophone, banjo, bass, Bontempi, carillon, cello, clavecin, double bass, drums, ebow, Fender Rhodes, guitar, Korg synthesizer, mandolin, marimba, melodica, organ, percussion, piano, toy piano, vibraphone, violone
- Elizabeth Fraser - vocals on "Kala" and "Mary"
- Jane Birkin - vocals on "Plus d'hiver"
- Stuart A. Staples - vocals on "A Secret Place"
- Dominique A - vocals on "Le Jour de l'ouverture"
- Miossec - vocals on "Le Jour de l'ouverture"
- Jean-François Assy - violoncello on "Kala", "La Veillée", "A Secret Place", and "La Boulange"
- Orchestre National de Paris on "Kala", "La Veillée", "Le Jour De L'Ouverture", "Mary", and "Les Retrouvailles"
- Frederic Dessus - violin on "La Veillée", "Plus d'hiver" and "Mary"
- Guillaume Fontanarosa - violin on "La Veillée", "Plus d'hiver" and "Mary"
- Bertrand Causse - vertical viola on "La Veillée", "Plus d'hiver", and "Mary"
- Anne Causse Biragnet - violoncello on "La Veillée", "Plus d'hiver", and "Mary"
- Armelle Legoff - violin on "Plus d'hiver" and "Mary"
- Frédéric Haffner - violin on "Plus d'hiver" and "Mary"
- Elliott - flute on "Les Enfants"
- Ludovic Morillon - drums on "La Boulange"
- Christine Ott - ondes Martenot on "La Boulange"

== Charts ==
Chart (2005)	Peak position
Belgian Albums Chart (Vl)	40
Belgian Albums Chart (Wa)	96
French Albums Chart	6
Swiss Albums Chart	48

== Certifications ==
Region	Certification	Certified units/sales
France (SNEP)	Gold	75,000^{*}
^{*} Sales figures based on certification alone.
