= On Tour (Yann Tiersen album) =

Live album by Yann Tiersen
- Released: November 13, 2006
- Length: 50:42
- Label: EMI France
- Producer: Yann Tiersen

Yann Tiersen chronology
Les Retrouvailles (2005)	On Tour (2006)	Tabarly (2008)

On Tour is a live album by Yann Tiersen. It was originally released in 2006 and features songs from Tiersen's past albums as well as some previously unreleased compositions. The album is notable for having a different approach to Tiersen's musical style: the usual multi-instrumental ensemble was replaced with electric guitars and an ondes Martenot performed by Christine Ott, giving the music a fresh rendition.

On Tour was also released as a DVD.

== Track listing ==
All music and lyrics are written by Yann Tiersen, except as noted.

=== CD release ===
1. "La Terrasse" – 5:08
2. "La Rade" (feat. Katel) – 3:24
3. "Ma France à moi" (Diam's, Grégory Berthou, Tyran) (feat. Diam's and Grégoire Simon) – 3:49
4. "Les Bras de mer" (Dominique A) – 5:31
5. "1er réveil par temps de guerre" (Marc Sens, Tiersen) – 4:17
6. "Mary" (feat. Elizabeth Fraser) – 3:21
7. "La Perceuse" (Christine Ott, Jean-Paul Roy, Ludovic Morillon, Sens, Tiersen) – 2:15
8. "State of Shock" (The Ex, Tom Cora) (feat. Marc Sens) – 5:36
9. "Le Train" – 4:46
10. "Esther" – 7:15
11. "La Rade" (Studio version) – 3:05

=== DVD release ===
1. "La Valse d'Amélie"
2. "A Secret Place"
3. "La Crise"
4. "Monochrome"
5. "Bagatelle" (Dominique A, Tiersen)
6. "Le Quartier"
7. "Les Bras de mer" (Dominique A)
8. "1er réveil par temps de Guerre" (Marc Sens, Tiersen) / "Sur le fil"
9. "La Terrasse"
10. "La Rade" (feat. Katel)
11. "La Perceuse" (Christine Ott, Jean-Paul Roy, Ludovic Morillon, Sens, Tiersen)
12. "Kala" (feat. Elizabeth Fraser)
13. "La Boulange"
14. "Western"
15. "Le Banquet"
16. "State of Shock" (The Ex, Tom Cora) (feat. Marc Sens)
17. "À ceux qui sont malades par mer calme" (feat. DD La Fleur)
18. "Le Train"
19. "Esther"

DVD bonus tracks

1. "La Veillée"
2. "Ma France à moi" (Diam's, Grégory Berthou, Tyran) (feat. Diam's and Grégoire Simon)
3. "Les Enfants"

== Personnel ==
Musicians

- Yann Tiersen – vocals, guitar, violin, toy piano
- Marc Sens – vocals, guitar, melodica, drill
- Grégoire Simon – vocals, horns
- Diam's – vocals
- Katel – vocals, guitar
- Elizabeth Fraser – vocals
- DD La Fleur – vocals
- Christine Ott – ondes Martenot
- Stéphane Bouvier – bass
- Ludovic Morillon – drums

Production

- Fabrice Laureau – producer, engineer, mixing
- Yann Tiersen – mixing
- Aymeric Letoquart – mixing
- John Dent – mastering

== Charts ==
Chart (2006)	Peak position
French Albums Chart	160
