= La Valse des monstres =

Studio album by Yann Tiersen
- Released: June 1995
- Recorded: Paris, March–April 1995
- Length: 44:54
- Label: Sine Terra Firma; Ici d'ailleurs
- Producer: Yann Tiersen

Yann Tiersen chronology
La Valse des monstres (1995)	Rue des cascades (1996)

La Valse des monstres (international English title: The Waltz of the Monsters) is the first album released by Breton composer Yann Tiersen. It includes several pieces he wrote as an accompaniment for short films and plays, together with original material. Most tracks had been used for the theatrical adaptation of Freaks, a 1932 American Pre-Code horror film directed by Tod Browning, or for the classic Japanese musical drama The Damask Drum, rewritten by Japanese author, poet and playwright, Yukio Mishima in 1955.

Only 1,000 copies of the album were pressed when it was released in June 1995 by Sine Terra Firma. It was subsequently reissued by Ici d'ailleurs in 1998 in both CD and vinyl formats.

== Background ==
Born in 1970 in Brest, Yann Tiersen grew up in Rennes starting to play the piano at the age of four and the violin at the age of six. The thriving musical scene in Rennes provided a background for Tiersen's musical development. Influenced by punk rock, when he was thirteen, Tiersen broke his violin, bought an electric guitar and started to play in rock bands. Over time, all his bandmates left to pursue other interests and Tiersen continued on his own. This eclectic upbringing would play an influence in his mature musical production.

Tiersen began writing the material that would form the basis for his first studio album around 1993. In the early 1990s the musician was experimenting with synths and samplers, looping samples from existing works to create his original compositions. After hours spent listening to old records, in search for orchestral strings to sample, Tiersen decided to record them himself. He therefore had his violin fixed and started using it, alongside the piano, to compose his music. To further expand his sound palette he brought in the accordion and the melodica which would act as wind instruments in his pieces, along with the toy piano and the harpsichord, this one playing the role of the guitar.

I couldn't play a brass instrument – I tried but I was really bad – I couldn't play the flute, and the accordion was a keyboard so it was easy.

— Yann Tiersen

The composer spent the summer of 1993 recording over forty compositions with guitar, violin and accordion. He described his vision as guided by intuition rather than the classical canon, pursuing the idea of "musical anarchy".

Let's live in an enormous world of sound we can use randomly, with no rules at all. [...] Let's play with sound, forget all knowledge and instrumental skills, and just use instinct – the same way punk did.

— Yann Tiersen

Some of these tracks were written for the theatrical adaptation of Freaks, a 1932 American horror film by Tod Browning, while others were inspired by Yukio Mishima's 1955 The Damask Drum and also served as an accompaniment for its representation.

== Composition ==
Tiersen subsequently assembled the album La Valse des monstres out of some tracks he had worked on in 1993, together with other compositions from the following months, and divided the track listing into two sections, each one named after the material it had been inspired by: "Freaks" (comprising the first ten tracks) and "Le Tambourin de Soie" (comprising the remaining seven). Recording took place in Paris in the spring of 1995.

The album consists of instrumental acoustic compositions, featuring piano, violin, toy piano, accordion, harpsichord, melodica chime and percussion. Tiersen played all instruments (except for the drums on two tracks) and carried on the mixing himself. He proceeded recording each element individually and subsequently layered the multiple tracks to obtain the final compositions. On "La Rue", for instance, each one of the four violins was recorded separately and the four recordings were later assembled into a more complex string section.

Behind their apparently playful and whimsical melodies, Tiersen's early compositions hide a bitter feeling of sadness and loss, as he himself repeatedly pointed out. Years later the composer spoke about the music from his first three albums, underlining its double nature: "There has always been a context where it's naïve, but also dark and linked to death."

== Legacy ==
Several of the unreleased compositions from the recording sessions that produced La Valse des monstres eventually saw the light as part of Tiersen's second studio album Rue des cascades, published in the following year, which would continue exploring the musical direction set by its predecessor. A violin solo version of the "Mouvement introductif" theme also appears on Rue des cascades.

Two tracks from La Valse des monstres ("La Valse des monstres" and "Le Banquet") were later included in the soundtrack of Jean-Pierre Jeunet's 2001 film Amélie, along with other songs from Tiersen's first three albums and original compositions the musician had worked on.

== Track listing ==
All music written and arranged by Yann Tiersen.

Freaks (Freaks)
No.	Title	International English title	Length
1.	"Mouvement introductif" (two pianos, violin, harpsichord)	"Introductory Movement"	2:06
2.	"La Valse des monstres" (accordions)	"The Waltz of the Monsters"	3:42
3.	"Frida" (toy piano)	"Frida"	1:33
4.	"Quimper 94" (accordion, violin, hi-hat)	"Quimper 94"	2:53
5.	"Ballendaï" (toy piano)	"Ballendaï"	2:13
6.	"Comptine d'été n° 17" (two harpsichords)	"Summer Nursery Rhyme No. 17"	2:12
7.	"Cléo au trapèze" (accordions, toy piano)	"Cleo on the Trapeze"	2:06
8.	"La Valse des monstres" (toy piano)	"The Waltz of the Monsters"	2:08
9.	"Le Banquet" (accordions, drums)	"The Banquet"	1:32
10.	"Comptine d'été n° 17" (toy piano)	"Summer Nursery Rhyme No. 17"	2:32

Le Tambourin de soie (The Silk Tambourine)
No.	Title	International English title	Length
11.	"Mouvement introductif" (eight melodicas, two harpsichords, piano)	"Introductory Movement"	5:37
12.	"La Rue" (four violins)	"the Street"	1:22
13.	"Iwakichi" (toy piano, chime, four violins)	"Iwakichi"	3:13
14.	"Hanako" (toy piano, chime, four violins)	"Hanako"	2:48
15.	"La Plaisanterie" (piano, toy piano, chime, tubular bell, accordion, harpsichord and violin)	"The Joke"	2:59
16.	"Le Compteur" (two harpsichords, piano, chime, melodica, violin)	"The Countdown"	4:08
17.	"Mouvement introductif" (harpsichord)	"Introductory Movement"	1:49
Total length:			44:54

== Personnel ==
Credits according to the album liner notes.

Musicians

- Yann Tiersen – piano, violin, harpsichord, accordion, toy piano, melodica, carillon, tubular bells, charleston
- Laurent Heudes – drums and charleston on "Quimper 94", drums on "Le Banquet"

Production

- Yann Tiersen – engineering, mixing
- Jonz – mastering

Artwork

- Frank Loriou – artwork and design
- Anne Boissez – artwork and design
- Gilles André – photography

== Charts ==
Chart (2001)	Peak position
French Albums Chart	139
