= Let in the Light =

Studio album by Shannon Wright
- Released: 8 May 2007
- Length: 34:06
- Label: Quarterstick Records

Shannon Wright chronology
| Yann Tiersen & Shannon Wright (2004) | Let in the Light (2007) | Honeybee Girls (2009) |

Professional ratings
Review scores
| Source | Rating |
|---|---|
| AllMusic | 4/5 stars |
| Pitchfork | 6/10 |

Let in the Light is a 2007 album by Shannon Wright.

== Track listing ==
1. Defy This Love – 3:39
2. St. Pete - 3:12
3. You Baffle Me - 3:04
4. Idle Hands - 2:12
5. When The Light Shone Down - 3:32
6. Don't You Doubt Me - 3:14
7. In The Morning - 3:23
8. Steadfast and True - 3:42
9. They'll Kill the Actor in the End - 3:14
10. Louise - 2:19
11. Everybody's Got Their Own Part to Play - 2:44
