= Ici, d'ailleurs... =

French independent record label

Ici, d'ailleurs…
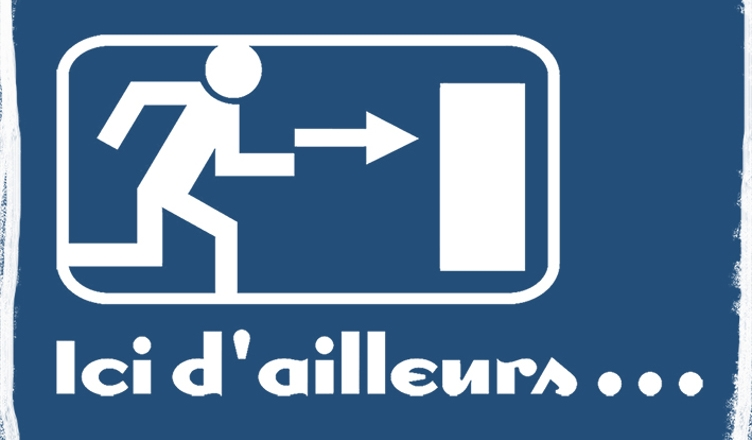
- Founded: 1997
- Founder: Stéphane Grégoire
- Genre: Post-rock, indie rock
- Country of origin: France
- Location: Nancy
- Official website: icidailleurs.fr

Ici, d'ailleurs... ("Here, in fact..." in French) is an independent record label based in Nancy, France and established by Stéphane Grégoire in 1997 from his associative label "Sine Terra Firma". It is mainly involved with production, publishing, booking and pressing.

== History ==
Sine Terra Firma released both first albums of Yann Tiersen, La Valse des monstres (1995) and Rue des Cascades (1996) and began to be successful. The last compilation of the associative label, called Ici, d'ailleurs... (1996), gave its name to the indie record label.

Ici, d'ailleurs... keeps an eclectic artistic direction, with no particularly musical genre.

The release of the third Yann Tiersen album, Le Phare (1998) allowed the label to expand internationally by proposing at once French and foreign artists, not recognized or on the way to the being.

In 2002, the label created 0101, the electronic division of the label.

Two years later, Ici, d'ailleurs... created a new collection named OuMuPo, an acronym for Ouvroir de MUsique POtentiel (workshop for potential music) in reference to the OuLiPo, OUvroir de LIttérature POtentiel (workshop for potential literature). The principle is making art under constraint. Several DJ's and electronic music composers have been offered to remix the whole label catalog. But there is a twist. They have to comply with constraints issued in the Ici, d'ailleurs... Charter. A huge fan of the OuBaPo, OUvroir de BAnde-Dessinée POtentiel (workshop for potential comics), Ici d'ailleurs... asked Jean-Christophe Menu, founder member of L'Association, an independent publishing society, to be in charge of the graphic side of the project. For each new work, the OuBaPiens, French cartoonists collective, created a sixteen pages comic book which comes along on top of each OuMuPo album, each time drawn by a different person. Again, these comics are ruled by a Charter to spice up the game. The collection includes six albums.

At the end of 2004, Stéphane Grégoire wanted to both re-interpret and pay tribute to Coil's music. The project This Immortal Coil was built step by step during five years with Yaël Naim, Bonnie Prince Billy, Yann Tiersen, Matt Elliott, DAAU, Chapelier Fou, Sylvain Chauveau, Christine Ott, Oktopus, Nightwood, David Donatien and Nicolas Jorio. The album "The Dark Age of Love" includes eleven Coil re-interpretations is released in October 2009.

== Members ==
Ici, d'ailleurs... currently represents seventy-three artists:

- ABD
- Aldea / Chiossone
- Angélique Ionatos
- Amor Belhom Duo
- Arca
- Arnaud Michniak
- Barth
- Bästard
- Bästard / Yann Tiersen
- Bed
- Bruit Noir
- Rodolphe Burger / Olivier Cadiot
- Chapelier Fou
- David Chalmin
- David Delabrosse
- DDamage
- Deity Guns
- Dominique Petitgand
- Ensemble 0 / Moondog
- Eric Aldea
- EZ3kiel
- Fugu
- Gablé
- Geins't Naït & Laurent Petitgand
- Gravité Zéro
- Gontard!
- Headphone
- I&Fused
- Jean-Philippe Goude
- Julien Ribot
- KaS Product
- Lars
- Linky
- Louis Ville
- Madrid
- Les Marquises
- Matt Elliott / Third Eye Foundation
- Mathias Delplanque
- Melaine Dalibert
- Mendelson
- Mein Sohn William
- Michel Cloup Duo
- Mick Hart
- Micro:mega
- Miët
- Narcophony
- Nonstop
- Numbers Not Names
- Orchard
- ORKA
- Pascal Bouaziz
- Le Professeur Inlassable
- Programme
- Spade & Archer
- Steve Tallis & The Holly Ghosts
- Stefan Wesołowski
- Stranded Horse
- Sylvain Chauveau & Ensemble Nocturne
- The Digital Intervention
- The Married Monk
- The Shoppings
- The Third Eye Foundation
- This Immortal Coil
- Thomas Belhom
- Tomasz Sroczyński
- Trupa Trupa
- Uruk
- Variety Lab
- Winter Family
- Yann Tiersen
- Yann Tiersen & Shannon Wright
- Zëro
- Zëro & Virginie Despentes

== Discography ==
- IDA001 - Yann Tiersen - La Valse des monstres - 1995
- IDA002 - Yann Tiersen - Rue des cascades - 1996
- IDA003 - Yann Tiersen - Le Phare - 1998
- IDA004 - Bästard - Radiant, Discharged, Crossed Off
- IDA005 - Bästard / Yann Tiersen - Untitled - 1999
- IDA006 - Bästard - Untitled
- IDA007 - Yann Tiersen / The Married Monk - Tout est calme - 1999
- IDA008 - Fugu - Fugu 1 - 2001
- IDA009 - Dominique Petitgand - Le sens de la mesure - 1999
- IDA00A - Various Artistes - Ici, d'ailleurs Compilation - 1998
- IDA00A# - Yann Tiersen - Black Session: Yann Tiersen
- IDA010 - Bed - The New Plum - 2001
- IDA011 - Madrid - Untitled - 2000
- IDA012 - The Married Monk - Rocky - 2001
- IDA013 - Amor Belhom Duo - Vavelab - 2001
- IDA014 - Amor Belhom Duo - Untitled - 2000
- IDA015 - Rodolphe Burger / Olivier Cadot - On n'est pas des indiens - 2000
- IDA016 - Julien Ribot - Hôtel Bocchi - 2002
- IDA017 - Dominique Petitgand - Rez de chaussée - 2001
- IDA018 - Amor Belhom Duo - Live in Tucson - 2002
- IDA019 - Dominique Petitgand - Le point de Côté - 2002
- IDA020 - Bästard - The Acoustic Machine - 2003
- IDA021 - Headphone - Work in Progress - 2003
- IDA022 - Bed - Spacebox - 2003
- IDA023 - Thomas Belhom - Remedios - 2004
- IDA024 - Julien Ribot - La métamorphose de Caspar dix - 2004
- IDA025 - The Married Monk - The Jim Side - 2004
- IDA026 - Programme - Bogue - 2004
- IDA027 - Matt Elliott - Drinking Songs - 2005
- IDA028 - The Married Monk - Belgian Kick - 2004
- IDA029 - Nonstop - Road movie en bequilles - 2005
- IDA030 - Yann Tiersen / Shannon Wright - Yann Tiersen & Shannon Wright - 2004
- IDA031 - Bed - New Lines - 2005
- IDA032 - Dominique Petitgand - Le bout de la langue - 2006
- IDA033 - Headphone - Two Stories High - 2006
- IDA034 - Barth - Under the Trampoline - 2006
- IDA035 - Bästard - Yet Reloaded... Live - 2006
- IDA036 - Thomas Belhom - No Border - 2006
- IDA037 - Matt Elliott - Failing Songs - 2007
- IDA038 - Arca - On ne distinguait plus les têtes - 2007
- IDA039 - Steve Tallis and The Holy Ghost - Loko - 2007
- IDA040 - Julien Ribot - Vega - 2008
- IDA041 - The Shoppings - Untitled - 2007
- IDA042 - Arnaud Michniak - Poing perdu - 2007
- IDA043 - Zëro - Go Stereo - 2007
- IDA044 - Zëro - Joke Box - 2007
- IDA045 - Barth - Cuchillo - 2008
- IDA046 - The Married Monk - Elephant People - 2008
- IDA047 - L'ensemble Jean-Philippe Goude - Aux solitudes - 2008
- IDA048 - Yann Tiersen - Tabarly - 2008
- IDA049 - Matt Elliott - Howling Songs - 2008
- IDA050 - ORKA - Livandi oyða - 2008
- IDA051 - Chapelier Fou - Darling, Darling, Darling - 2009
- IDA052LP - Bästard - The Hunt - 1994/2008
- IDA053LP - Bästard - Chinatown - 1995/2008
- IDA054 - Barth - Cuchillo Revisited
- IDA055 - Zëro - Bobby Fisher - 2009
- IDA056 - Deity Guns - Recollection - 2009
- IDA057 - Jean-Philippe Goude - Pour l'instant - 2009
- IDA058 - Nonstop - J'ai rien compris mais je suis d'accord - 2009
- IDA059 - Programme - Agent Réel - 2010
- IDA060 - This Immortal Coil - The Dark Age of Love - 2009
- IDA061 - Chapelier Fou - Scandale - 2009
- IDA062 - Zëro - Dead Machine - 2009
- IDA063 - Jean-Philippe Goude - De anima - 2010
- IDA064 - Jean-Philippe Goude - Ainsi de nous - 2010
- IDA065 - Jean-Philippe Goude - La divine nature des choses - 2010
- IDA066 - Jean-Philippe Goude - Rock de chambre - 2010
- IDA067 - Matt Elliott - Failed Songs - 2009
- IDA068 - Chapelier Fou - 613 - 2010
- IDA070 - Yann Tiersen - PALESTINE - 2008
- IDA071 - The Third Eye Foundation - The Dark - 2010
- IDA072 - Thomas Belhom - Rocéphine - 2012
- IDA073 - Dälek - Absence - 2011
- IDA074 - Dälek - From Filthy Tongue Of Gods And Griots - 2015
- IDA075 - Numbers Not Name - What's The Price ? - 2012
- IDA076 - Orka - Óró - 2011
- IDA077 - Matt Elliott - The Broken Man - 2011
- IDA078 - Chapelier Fou - Al Abama - 2011
- IDA079 - Zëro - Hungry Dogs (In The Backyard) - 2011
- IDA080 - Mein Sohn William - Mein Sohn William - 2012
- IDA081 - Bästard - Acoustic Machine Vol.1 - 2011
- IDA082 - Bästard - Acoustic Machine Vol.2 - 2011
- IDA083 - Winter Family - Red Sugar

- 2011

- IDA084 - Chapelier Fou - Invisible - 2012
- IDA084.1 - Chapelier Fou - Protest EP - 2014
- IDA085 - Manyfingers / Matt Elliott - S/T - 2012
- IDA086 - Numbers Not Names - Numbers Not Names - 2012
- IDA087 - Thomas Belhom - Maritima - 2014
- IDA087.1 - Thomas Belhom - Hungary / Porcelaine - 2014
- IDA088 - Matt Elliott - The Mess We Made - 2013
- IDA089 - Gablé - Murded - 2013
- IDA090 - Mendelson - Mendelson - 2013
- IDA091 - Michel Cloup Duo - Minuit Dans Tes Bras - 2014
- IDA091_1 - Michel Cloup Duo - J'ai Peur De Nous - 2013
- IDA091_2 - Michel Cloup Duo - Nous Vieillirons Ensemble - 2013
- IDA092 - Matt Elliott - Only Myocardial Infarction Can Break Your Heart - 2013
- IDA093 - Mendelson - Personne Ne Le Fera Pour Nous - 2013
- IDA094 - Zëro - Places Where We Go In Dreams - 2014
- IDA095 - Les Marquises - Pensée Magique - 2014
- IDA096 - Peter Von Poehl - Vanishing Waves - 2013
- IDA097 - Mein Sohn William - Ever Day, In Every Way - 2014
- IDA098 - Chapelier Fou - Deltas - 2014
- IDA098.1 - Chapelier Fou - Tea Tea Tea - 2014
- IDA098.2 - Chapelier Fou - Fuses - 2015
- IDA099 - Diabologum - #3 - 2015
- IDA100 - David Chalmin - La Terre Invisible - 2019
- IDA100.1 - David Chalmin - Continuum - 2020
- IDA101 - EZ3kiel - Lux - 2014
- IDA101.1 - EZ3kiel - Lux Continuum - 2014
- IDA102 - Matt Elliott - The Calm Before - 2016
- IDA103 - Bruit Noir - I / III - 2015
- IDA104 - Angélique Ionatos - Reste La Lumière - 2015
- IDA105 - Michel Cloup Duo - Live A La Gaïté Lyrique - 2015
- IDA106 - Sylvain Chauveau - Down To The Bone (An Acoustic Tribute To Depeche Mode) - 2015
- IDA107 - Julien Sagot - Valse 333 - 2015
- IDA108 - Pascal Bouaziz - Haïkus - 2016
- IDA109 - Les Marquises - A Night Full Of Collapses - 2017
- IDA110 - Michel Cloup Duo - Ici Et Là-Bas - 2016
- IDA111 - The Third Eye Foundation - Semxtex - 2016
- IDA112 - Mendelson - L'Avenir Est Devant - 2016
- IDA113 - Mendelson - Quelque Part - 2016
- IDA114 - Gontard ! - Repeupler - 2016
- IDA115 - EZ3kiel - Lux Live - 2016
- IDA116 - Zëro - San Francisco - 2016
- IDA117 - Gablé - JoLLy TrouBLe - 2016
- IDA118 - Chapelier Fou - Kalia - 2016
- IDA119 - The Third Eye Foundation - Wake The Dead - 2017
- IDA120 - EZ3kiel - Re L.U.X - 2016
- IDA121 - Winter Family - South From Here - 2017
- IDA122 - Chapelier Fou - Muance - 2017
- IDA123 - Michel Cloup Duo - Notre Silence - 2016
- IDA124 - Deity Guns - Transline Appointment - 2017
- IDA125 - Trupa Trupa - Headache - 2016
- IDA126 - Michel Cloup Duo - Saison 1 (2010 - 2015) - 2016
- IDA127 - Bästard - Radiant, Discharged, Crossed-Off - 2017
- IDA128 - Zëro - 2007 - 2014 - 2017
- IDA129 - Mendelson - Sciences Politiques - 2017
- IDA130 - Chapelier Fou - ! - 2017
- IDA131 - Chapelier Fou - 31+6 - 2017
- IDA132 - Gontard ! - Tout Naît/Tout S'Achève Par Un Disque - 2017
- IDA133 - The Married Monk - Headgearalienpoo - 2018
- IDA134 - Zëro - Ain't That Mayhem - 2018
- IDA135 - Julien Sagot - Bleu Jane - 2018
- IDA136 - Trupa Trupa - Jolly New Songs - 2018
- IDA137 - Elpmas (Moondog) Revisité - 2018
- IDA139 - Bruit Noir - II / III - 2019
- IDA140 - Michel Cloup Duo - Danser Danser Danser Sur Les Ruines - 2019
- IDA141 - Matt Elliott - Farewell To All We Know - 2020
- IDA142 - Gontard ! - 2029 - 2019
- IDA143 - Miët - Stumbling, Climbing, Nesting - 2019
- IDA144 - Chapelier Fou - Méridiens - 2020
- IDA145 - Chapelier Fou - Parallèles - 2020
- IDA146 - Diabologum - La Jeunesse Est Un Art - 2020
- IDA146.1 - Diabologum - C'Etait Un Lundi Après-Midi Semblable Aux Autres - 2020
- IDA146.2 - Diabologum - Le Goût Du Jour - 2020
- IDA146.3 - Diabologum - L'Art Est Dans La Rue - 2020
- IDA147 - Zëro / Despentes - Requiem Des Innocents - 2020
- IDA148 - Michel Cloup / Julien Rufié / Pascal Bouaziz - A La Ligne - 2020
- IDA149 - Mendelson - Le Dernier Album - 2021
- IDA150 - Stranded Horse - Grand Rodéo - 2021
- IDA151 - Gontard ! - Akène - 2021
- IDA153 - DDamage - Radio Ape - 2021
- IDA154 - Chapelier Fou - Ensemb7e - 2022
- Oumupo1 - Third Eye Foundation & Gerner
- Oumupo2 - Rob Swift & Lecroart
- Oumupo3 - Rubin Steiner & Luz
- Oumupo4 - Kid Loco & Menu
- Oumupo5 - Dj Hide & Dupuy / Berberian
- Oumupo6 - Dj Krush & Killofer
- Oumupo Box P. - Box+6 Cd+Livret Anne Barraou
- Oumupo Box V. - Box Vide+Livret Anne Barraou
- 0101.01 - Eric Aldea - Saturno o Cipolla ? - 2002
- 0101.02 - I N Fused - Kind of Clue - 2002
- 0101.03 - Micro : Mega - Annex - 2002
- 0101.04 - Variety Lab - Providence - 2003
- 0101.05 - Aldea / Chiossone - Narcophony - 2002
- 0101.06 - Gravité Zéro - Infini - 2003
- 0101.07 - Gravité Zéro - Gravité Zéro - 2003
- 0101.08 - Linky - Quiet Rooms - 2004
- 0101.09 - Le Professeur Inlassable - Leçon N°1 - 2004
- 0101.10 - Micro:mega - Where We Go Don't Need It Anymore - 2005
- 0101.11 - Narcophony - Kabul - 2005
- 0101.12 - Gravité Zéro - Remix - 2005
- 0101.13 - Narcophony - Plays The Residents - 2005
- 0101.14 - Spade & Archer - Highway to Jail - 2006
- 0101.15 - I&N Fused - Slow Eater - 2008
- 0101.PS1 - The Digital Intervention - Capture - 2003

Mind Travels

- MT01 - Geins't Naït & Laurent Petitgand - Je Vous Dis - 2014
- MT02 - Manyfingers - The Spectacular Nowhere - 2015
- MT03LP - Aidan Baker - The Sea Swells A Bit - 2015
- MT04 - Stefan Wesolowski - Kompleta - 2015
- MT05 - Geins't Naït & Laurent Petitgand - Oublier - 2015
- MT06 - Mathias Delplanque - Drachen - 2015
- MT07 - Stefan Wesolowski - Rite Of The End - 2017
- MT08 - The Orchards - Serendipity - 2017
- MT09 - Arca - Forces - 2018
- MT11 - Uruk - Mysterium Coniunctionis - 2018
- MT12 - Geins't Naït & Laurent Petitgand - Like This Maybe Or This - 2020
- MT13 - Tomasz Sroczynski - Symphony N°2 - 2021

== See also ==
- List of record labels: I–Q
