= Yann Tiersen & Shannon Wright =

Studio album by Yann Tiersen and Shannon Wright
- Released: 26 October 2004
- Recorded: 2004
- Genre: Experimental
- Length: 38:46
- Label: Ici, d'ailleurs...
- Producer: Yann Tiersen

Yann Tiersen chronology
Good Bye Lenin! (2003)	Yann Tiersen & Shannon Wright (2004)	Les Retrouvailles (2005)

Shannon Wright chronology
Over the Sun (2004)	Yann Tiersen & Shannon Wright (2004)	Let in the Light (2007)

Professional ratings
Review scores
Source	Rating
Pitchfork Media	6.8/10 stars

Yann Tiersen & Shannon Wright is a collaboration album between French musician Yann Tiersen and American singer and songwriter Shannon Wright.

== Track listing ==
All lyrics are written by Shannon Wright. All music is composed by Yann Tiersen and Shannon Wright.

No.	Title	Instruments	Length
1.	"No Mercy for She"	Tiersen – cello, vibraphone, accordion, bass, violin Wright – vocals, bass, guitar, piano	5:42
2.	"Dragon Fly"	Tiersen – accordion, acoustic guitar, bass Wright – vocals, guitar	3:15
3.	"Sound the Bells"	Tiersen – vibraphone, organ, bass, piano, violin Wright – vocals, electric piano, drums, guitar	3:48
4.	"Something to Live For"	Tiersen – horns, viola, bass, piano, violin Wright – vocals	4:13
5.	"Dried Sea"	Tiersen – vibraphone, viola, piano Wright – vocals, bass, drums, guitar	4:13
6.	"While You Sleep"	Tiersen – bass, violin Wright – vocals, drums, guitar	2:33
7.	"Ode to a Friend"	Tiersen – cello, organ, viola, marimba, bass, violin Wright – vocals, electric piano, bass, drums, guitar, piano	3:49
8.	"Ways to Make You See"	Tiersen – organ, guitar, bass Wright – vocals, guitar, piano	4:11
9.	"Callous Sun"	Tiersen – electric piano, bass Wright – vocals, drums, piano	3:15
10.	"Pale White"	Tiersen – acoustic guitar, viola, guitar, piano Wright – vocals, drums, guitar	3:47
Total length:			38:46

== Personnel ==
Musicians

- Yann Tiersen – bass, violin, viola, piano, vibraphone, organ, cello, acoustic guitar, guitar, accordion, horns, marimba, electric piano
- Shannon Wright – vocals, guitar, drums, piano, electric piano, bass

Production

- Fabrice Laureau – recording and mixing
- Roger Seibel – mastering
- Artwork by Yann Tiersen, Shannon Wright, and others

== Charts ==
Chart (2004–2005)	Peak position
French Albums Chart	60
