= Rue des cascades =

Studio album by Yann Tiersen
- Released: April 1996
- Recorded: Nancy, Paris, 1995–1996
- Length: 50:42
- Label: Sine Terra Firma; Ici d'ailleurs; Labels

Yann Tiersen chronology
La Valse des monstres (1995)	Rue des cascades (1996)	Le Phare (1998)

Professional ratings
Review scores
Source	Rating
Allmusic	3/5 stars

Rue des cascades (international English title: Cascade Street) is the second studio album by the musician and composer Yann Tiersen. It was released through Sine Terra Firma in 1996, and subsequently reissued in 1998, 2001, and 2009 through Ici, d'ailleurs... and Virgin Records in CD and double LP formats. The album, with the exclusion of two pieces, "Naomi" and "La Vie quotidienne", is a collection of short pieces recorded with toy piano, harpsichord, violin, accordion, mandolin, and other conventional and unconventional musical instruments such as an old typewriter in "Pas si simple". The title track, which was used about one year later for the film score of the Palme d'Or nominated French drama film The Dreamlife of Angels, was sung by French soloist singer Claire Pichet, who also provided vocals on the track "Naomi", a song that features words from Allen Ginsberg's poem "Kaddish". François-Xavier Schweyer played the cello on "C'était ici" and "La Fenêtre". Three tracks, "J'y suis jamais allé", "Pas si simple", and "Soir de fête", would find a wider audience five years later when they were featured on the soundtrack to Jean-Pierre Jeunet's acclaimed film Amélie.

== Track listing ==
Music and lyrics by Yann Tiersen, except on "Naomi", which also has words from Allen Ginsberg's "Kaddish".

1. "J'y suis jamais allé" - 1:35
2. "Rue des cascades" - 4:02 (sung by Claire Pichet)
3. "Pas si simple" - 1:54
4. "Comptine d'été n° 2" - 2:13
5. "Comptine d'été n° 3" - 1:53
6. "Déjà loin" - 2:53
7. "La Chambre" - 1:48
8. "Mouvement introductif" - 2:22
9. "La Muette" - 3:35
10. "Naomi" - 4:06 (sung by Claire Pichet)
11. "Soir de fête" - 2:54
12. "Le Vieux en veut encore" - 1:44
13. "Toujours là" - 1:10
14. "C'était ici" - 1:38
15. "Prière n° 2" - 1:27
16. "Comptine d'été n° 1" - 2:17
17. "La Fenêtre" - 2:50
18. "Prière n° 3" - 1:03
19. "La Pièce vide" - 1:42
20. "La Vie quotidienne" - 7:36

== Personnel ==
Musicians

- Yann Tiersen – violin, accordion, mandolin, bells, harpsichord, piano, old typewriter, strings, banjo, guitar, marmites, melodica, handclaps, toy piano, small pipe, music box
- Claire Pichet – vocals on "Rue des cascades" and "Naomi"
- François-Xavier Schweyer – cello on "C'était ici" and "La Fenêtre"

Production

- Yann Tiersen – engineering, mixing
- François Dietz – engineering, mixing
- Frank Loriou – artwork
- Jo Pinto-Maïa – photography

== Charts ==
Chart (2001)	Peak position
French Albums Chart	51
