= All (Yann Tiersen album) =

Studio album by Yann Tiersen
- Released: 15 February 2019
- Studio: The Eskal, Ushant, France
- Length: 1:02:02
- Producer: Gareth Jones

Yann Tiersen chronology
EUSA (2016)	All (2019)	Portrait (2019)

Singles from All
- 1. "Koad" Released: 12 December 2018; 2. "Erc'h" Released: 1 May 2019

Professional ratings
Aggregate scores
Source	Rating
Metacritic	76/100
Review scores
Source	Rating
AllMusic	4/5 stars
Drowned in Sound	9/10
Exclaim!	8/10

All is the tenth studio album by French musician Yann Tiersen. It was released on 15 February 2019 through Mute Records.

== Track listing ==
No.	Title	Length
1.	"Tempelhof"	6:09
2.	"Koad"	6:00
3.	"Erc'h"	9:20
4.	"Usal Road"	2:59
5.	"Pell"	5:54
6.	"Bloavezhioù"	4:58
7.	"Heol"	6:32
8.	"Gwennilied"	4:33
9.	"Aon"	2:49
10.	"Prad"	4:54
11.	"Beure Kentañ"	7:54

== Charts ==
Chart	Peak position
Belgian Albums (Ultratop Flanders)	63
Belgian Albums (Ultratop Wallonia)	116
French Albums (SNEP)	66
Swiss Albums (Schweizer Hitparade)	50
UK Independent Albums (OCC)	23
