= Good Bye, Lenin! (soundtrack) =

Soundtrack album by Yann Tiersen
- Released: 18 February 2003
- Recorded: 2002
- Length: 46:39
- Label: EMI
- Producer: Yann Tiersen

Yann Tiersen chronology
C'était ici (2002)	Good Bye, Lenin! (2003)	Yann Tiersen & Shannon Wright (2004)

Good Bye, Lenin! is the original soundtrack album of the 2003 film Good Bye, Lenin! starring Daniel Brühl and Katrin Sass. The music is composed by Yann Tiersen, with the exception of the non-instrumental version of "Summer 78" sung by Claire Pichet. This album has been released with the Copy Control protection system in some regions.

== Analysis ==
Parts of the soundtrack are reminiscent of Yann Tiersen's best known film work, the soundtrack for Amélie, which was in turn strongly influenced by French music. In fact, one of the songs on Amélie, "Comptine d'un autre été : L'après-midi", was also used on Good bye, Lenin! during the scene of the family's first East-West Berlin outing, although it does not appear on the soundtrack album.

Additionally, the song “Veriu Ya” (“Верю я”) by Bravo, performed by Zhanna Aguzarova, is heard playing on the radio during the scene in which Lara practices making plaster casts with Alex in the bathroom.

== Reception ==
Professional ratings
Review scores
Source	Rating
Allmusic	3/5 stars

== Track listing ==
All songs written by Yann Tiersen

Good Bye, Lenin! – Standard edition
No.	Title	Length
1.	"Summer 78 (Sung by Claire Pichet)"	3:55
2.	"Preparations for the Last TV Fake"	3:07
3.	"Mother's Journey"	1:28
4.	"Good Bye Lenin"	4:57
5.	"Father and Mother"	2:54
6.	"Lara's Castle"	1:47
7.	"Childhood (1)"	1:37
8.	"The Deutsch Mark Is Coming"	1:11
9.	"Childhood (2)"	1:44
10.	"Letters"	1:21
11.	"Mother Will Die"	3:09
12.	"Father Is Late"	1:32
13.	"First Rendez-Vous"	1:17
14.	"Dishes"	0:47
15.	"I Saw Daddy Today"	2:04
16.	"The Decant Session"	0:47
17.	"Watching Lara"	1:28
18.	"Summer 78 (Instrumental)"	3:52
Total length:		38:57

== Personnel ==
Adapted from album liner notes.

- Noémie Airiau - Violin
- Stéphane Avenas - Direction
- Emmanuel Bacquet - Photography
- Jean Noël Bériat - Double Bass
- Laurent Bernard - Bassoon
- Guillaume Bourgogne - Conductor
- Marie Elsa Bretagne - Viola
- Daniel Chambard - Tuba
- Muriel Charbonnier - Violin
- Myriam Constans - Oboe
- Sylvie Dalmais - Violin
- Sabine Dubosc - Cello
- Dominique Eudeline - Flute
- Marc Guérolt - Studio Assistant
- Michel Herbaux - Trumpet
- Conny Klein - Photography
- Moïra Le Luron Kressmann - Violin
- Nadia Kuentz - Violin
- Martin Kukula - Photography
- Valerie Delhomme Lavigne - Cello
- Valérie Lewandowski - Piccolo
- Sissie Lhoumeau - Violin
- Annabelle Luis - Cello
- Béatrice Meunier - Violin
- Irène Nazarian - Violin
- Pierre Perosino Gravallon - Vibraphone
- Sophie Perrot - Violin
- Claire Pichet - Vocals
- Sylvie Pinsello - Violin
- Dirk Plamböck - Photography
- Didier Reymond - Bass Clarinet
- Isabelle Reynaud - Violin
- Geneviève Rigot - Viola
- Isabelle Salelles - Violin
- Anne Sophie Siméand - Viola
- Lelia Stahl - Violin
- Andro Steinborn - Music Coordinator
- Yann Tiersen - Composer
- Pascal Torgue - Trombone
- Céline Traversaz - Viola
- Uliyana Vaccani - Viola
- Anne Laure Verne - Violin
- Jean Marie Verne - Double Bass
- Pascale Verne - Violin
- Emmanuel Villemaux - Violin

== Charts ==
Chart (2003)	Peak position
French Albums Chart	49
