= Miossec =

French singer and songwriter (born 1964)

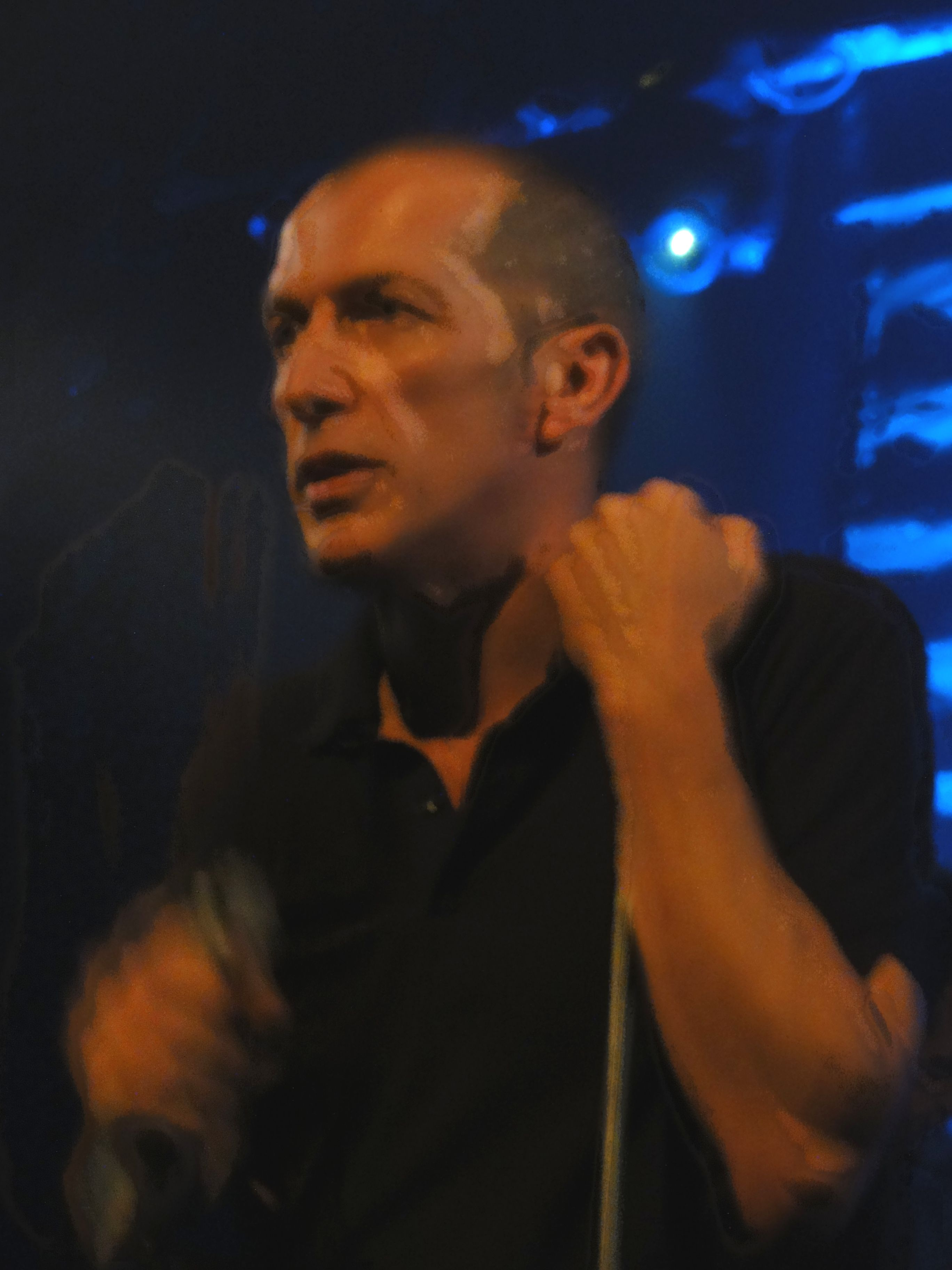
- Miossec in concert, in Lausanne in 2012.

Background information
- Born: Christophe Miossec; 24 December 1964 (age 61); Brest, Brittany, France
- Genres: Indie rock Acoustic rock
- Occupations: Singer, songwriter
- Instrument: Vocals
- Years active: 1992–present
- Label: PIAS
- Website: Official website

Christophe Miossec (born 24 December 1964 in Brest, Brittany, France) is a French singer and songwriter.

== Beginnings ==
Christophe Miossec was not new to the world of music when he met his first success. Between 14 and 17, he was in a teenage band, Printemps Noir ("Black Spring"), touring around Brest.

After obtaining his Baccalauréat in literature, Miossec went to study history at the Brest University, and quickly got bored. He then worked some time for the paper Ouest France. Journalism didn't suit him any better than history did, so he moved to Paris, and went from one little job to another for some time. He finally joined the French TV Station TF1 and worked there for two and a half years. Eventually, he began to think about turning back to music.

In 1993, he had a critical meeting with guitarist Guillaume Jouan, which led the two to start working on an album. A year later, they were joined by the guitarist Bruno Leroux.

== Boire to Chansons ordinaires: 1995–present ==
After having tested out 15 or so compositions, the trio went into a studio and created their first album Boire (English: Drink), which was released in 1995. An auspicious début, it was declared Album of the year by the magazine Les Inrockuptibles. The wry, world-weary lyrics and the sparse, stripped-down musical backdrop of Boire would gain more than critical acclaim; the album would meet a promising commercial success with over 90,000 copies sold.

Encouraged by this, Miossec set out to record a second album, this time with an expanded band, which included his previous two guitarists and Yves-André Lefeuvre on the drums, and Olivier Mellano (a frequent collaborator with Dominique A) on guitar and violin. Together, they would make Baiser (a double entendre meaning both "a kiss" and "to fuck") in 1997. This album was marked by a new, fuller musical arrangement that disappointed some fans who preferred the understated musical backdrop of the first album, but Baiser was, nonetheless, another critical and commercial success for Miossec. He was nominated for the 1997 Victoires de la Musique prize for Best newcomer, but he stated that he did not want to take part in the event.

A year later, the third album, A prendre (English: To Be Taken), would come out only one year later, coïnciding with the birth of his son, Theo. Sounding somewhat like a mix of the first two albums, Miossec was not happy with this recording, considering it to be commissioned and written too quickly, but, ironically, A prendre would be his biggest commercial success to that date, with over 120,000 copies of the album having been sold. The success of A prendre meant that Miossec came to a wider public attention, opening up new horizons and allowing him to write songs for other artists.

His success with A prendre, his least-loved album, left a bitter taste in Miossec's mouth, which he wanted to wash away. His attempt at this led to the fourth album, Brûle (English: Burn), which some considered to be demonstrative of the growing maturity of the artist. The album features a song, "Grandir", that seems to be referring to his son, revealing a new dimension to Miossec's songwriting.

Miossec's fifth album would unexpectedly feature a symphonic orchestra backing Miossec's compositions. Entitled 1964 in reference to Miossec's year of birth, this album surprised many fans when it was released in 2004. It was followed by L'Étreinte (English: The Embrace), which was scheduled for release in March 2006, but was not until August 21, later that year, which would coincide with Saint Christopher's Day. Songs like "La Facture d'électricité" (English: "The Electricity Bill") or "Trente ans" (English: "Thirty Years") remind one of the lyrical and musical style of Boire.

The seventh album, Finistériens, released in 2009, was produced by Yann Tiersen who also wrote the music with Miossec. The title references the French département where both artists are born.

In 2011, the eighth album was released. It is entitled Chansons ordinaires (English: Ordinary Songs), a reference to French writer Georges Perros and his novel-poem Une Vie ordinaire (English: An Ordinary Life).

== Discography ==
=== Albums ===
Year	Album	Peak positions		
Year	Album	FR	BEL (Wa)	SWI
1995	Boire (Pias)			
1997	Baiser (Pias)	11	–	–
1998	À prendre (Pias)	4	–	–
2001	Brûle (Pias)	6	–	–
2004	1964 (Pias)	4	8	70
2006	L'Étreinte (Pias)	4	5	39
2009	Finistériens (Pias)	7	9	88
2011	Chansons ordinaires (Pias)	4	10	–
2014	Ici-bas, ici même (Pias)	5	9	83
2016	Mammifères (Columbia)	7	17	49
2023	Simplifier (Columbia)	–	52	–

=== Singles ===
Year	Single	Peak positions	Album
Year	Single	FR	Album
2014	"On vient à peine de commencer"	154	Ici-bas, ici même

=== Other songs recorded ===
- 1998 : "Stade Brestoa", on the compilation Amour Foot
- 1998 : "Quoi, ma gueule" with Pascal Comelade, original from Johnny Hallyday on the compilation Comme un seul homme
- 2001 : "La non-demande en marriage", original from Georges Brassens on the compilation Les Oiseaux de passage
- 2001 : "Ballade de Melody Nelson", original from Serge Gainsbourg on the compilation Pop Sessions
- 2002 : "Extase à St Malo", on the album Le dernier cri from Ali Dragon
- 2004 : "Pour un flirt avec toi" with Jane Birkin, original from Michel Delpech on the album Rendez-vous from Jane Birkin
- 2005 : "Le jour de l'ouverture" with Yann Tiersen and Dominique A, on the album Les retrouvailles from Yann Tiersen

=== Lyrics ===
Christophe Miossec also wrote texts for Alain Bashung, Axel Bauer, Jane Birkin, Jeff Bodart, Daran, Frandol, Juliette Gréco, Johnny Hallyday, Dani, Erwann Mentheour, Polar or Mass Hysteria.

- 1999 : Les avalanches for Jane Birkin, on the album 'À la légère.
- 2000 : Notre histoire, Remise de peine and Ex, for Johnny Hallyday, on the album Sang pour sang.
- 2000 : Une prière for Axel Bauer, on the album Personne n'est parfait.
- 2001 : La vie la mort for Jeff Bodart, on the album Ca ne me suffit plus.
- 2001 : Rose for Frandol, on the 5 songs CD Demo.
- 2002 : Faisons envie for Alain Bashung, on the album L'imprudence.
- 2003 : Il et elle, Couvre-feu and Adieu Bohème, for Juliette Gréco, on the album Aimez-vous les uns les autres ou bien disparaissez.
- 2003 : L'amour et l'air for Daran, on the album Pêcheur de pierres.
- 2004 : Chanson pour un salaud for Dani, on the album Tout dépend du contexte.
- 2005 : Fausse route, On coule, Un homme à la mer, La permanence and Laisser penser, for Mass Hysteria, on the album Mass Hysteria.
- 2010 : Je ne serai jamais ta Parisienne for Nolwenn Leroy, on the album Bretonne (album).
