= Claire Pichet =

French singer

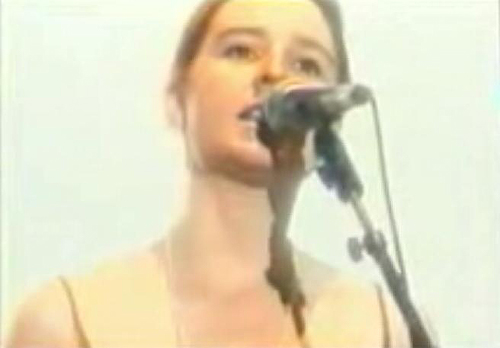
- Claire Pichet singing at Eurorock

Background information
- Born: Claire Pichet
- Origin: France
- Occupation: Soloist
- Instruments: vocals, piano

Claire Pichet is a French soloist singer and musician. She sang the song "Summer 78" on the soundtrack of Good Bye Lenin! (2003). She collaborated with multi-instrumentalist and composer Yann Tiersen on the song "Rue des cascades" (1996).

== Recordings ==
- "Summer 78" on soundtrack of Good Bye Lenin!
- The Dreamlife of Angels, soundtrack.
- Rue des cascades
- Le Phare
- La Rupture

== See also ==
- Yann Tiersen

== Multimedia ==
- Rue des cascades – Black session (live) on YouTube (in French)
