= Bontempi =

Italian musical instruments manufacturer

- Industry: Musical instruments
- Founded: 1937
- Headquarters: Potenza Picena, Italy
- Website: www.bontempi.com

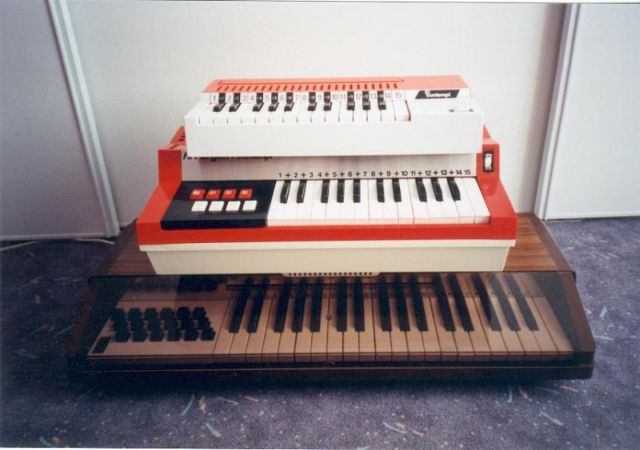
Bontempi chord organs

Bontempi, founded 1937, is an Italian musical instrument manufacturer. It is best known for producing low-priced, plastic-cased chord organs.

== History ==
Founded in 1937 in Potenza Picena, Italy, Bontempi gained prominence during the 1970s and 1980s with its popular chord organs. These instruments, featuring fan-blown reeds, were widely regarded for their accessibility and affordability. By the mid-1980s, Bontempi transitioned to manufacturing home electronic keyboards, further solidifying its reputation in the musical instrument market.

In 1985 Bontempi acquired Farfisa's music division.

== Product Range ==
The company produced a range of chord organs. Typically with a small keyboard, these instruments produced sound by air being forced over reeds by an electric fan.

Bontempi has also produced offerings include a range of keyboards, guitars, drum kits, and tuned percussion instruments designed for both educational purposes and amateur musicians. The company remains committed to producing affordable and innovative musical instruments for global audiences.

== Cultural impact and legacy ==
Some European musicians use the expression "having a Bontempi sound" to describe electronic instruments with a nostalgic, toy-like quality. This term reflects the cultural significance of Bontempi instruments during their peak popularity in Western Europe.

Bontempi's influence extends beyond its original products. The legacy of its iconic sound has inspired contemporary musicians, including Bontempi Love Organ, an electronic artist from Bradford, England. By adopting the name, Bontempi Love Organ pays homage to the brand's impact on the electronic music world, blending nostalgic tones with modern styles.

== See also ==
- List of Italian companies
