= Aya no Tsuzumi =

15th-century Japanese Noh play

綾鼓
- English title: The Damask Drum; The Twill Drum
- Written by: unknown, perhaps Zeami
- Category: 4th — miscellaneous
- Characters: maeshite old gardener ai attendant waki court official tsure Imperial Consort nochijite phantom
- Place: Asakura, Fukuoka
- Time: 7th century
- Schools: Hōshō, Kongo and Komparu

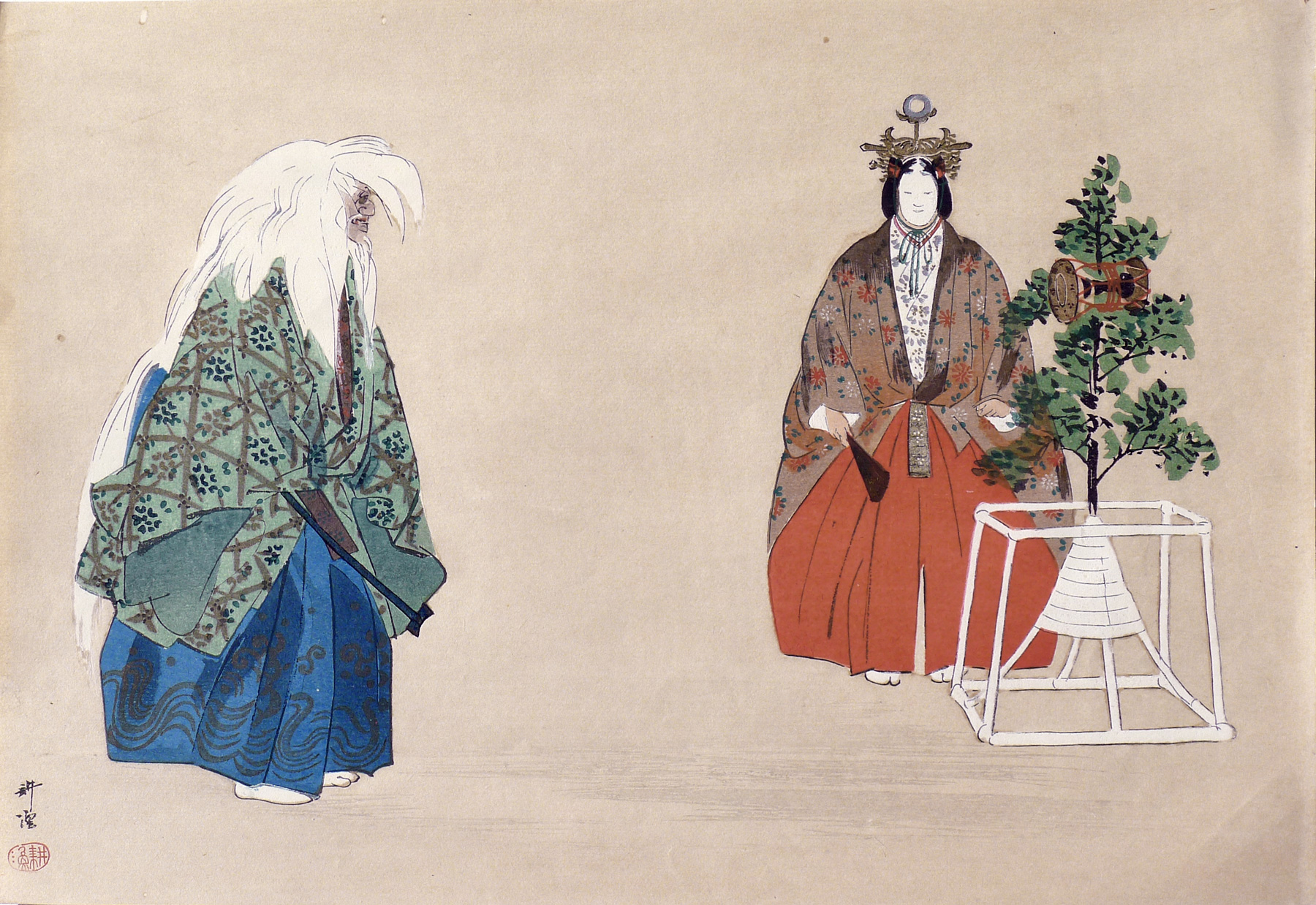
Aya no Tsuzumi, from the series Nōga taikan, by Tsukioka Kōgyo

Aya no Tsuzumi (綾鼓, "The Damask/Twill Drum") is a Japanese Noh play by an unknown author, written in the 15th century.

The fact that Zeami wrote a revised version of the play, called Koi no omoni ("Love's Heavy Burden") has led to the speculation that the original play might also be Zeami's.

The word aya means twill, but the first English translation by Arthur Waley used the word damask, and this choice is almost invariably preserved by later western writers. According to Tyler, "damask is far more evocative - and suitably so - in english".

The play, which depicts the tragic consequences of unrequited desire, has been praised as "frightening" and "difficult to forget". It has been translated into English twice, by Arthur Waley in 1921 and by Royall Tyler in 1992.

== Plot ==
The gardener at the Palace of Chikuzen has fallen in love with the Imperial Consort. She sends a message to the gardener that she will meet him at the pond if he beats the drum which she has placed in a laurel tree in the garden. He tries but the drum has been made with twill (aya) and so cannot sound. Realising that he has been made a fool of, the gardener drowns himself in the pond and returns as an evil ghost who torments the princess.

== Adaptations ==
Japanese playwright Yukio Mishima wrote his own adaptation of the play in his collection Kindai Nogakushu in 1957.

Wilford Leach and John Braswell's ETC Company staged an English-language adaptation of Aya No Tsuzumi, called Demon, in repertory at La MaMa Experimental Theatre Club throughout the 1970s.
