= Amélie (soundtrack) =

Soundtrack album by Yann Tiersen
- Released: 23 April 2001
- Genre: Avant-garde; bal-musette; contemporary classical
- Length: 53:03
- Label: Virgin
- Producer: Yann Tiersen

Yann Tiersen chronology
| Black Session: Yann Tiersen (1999) | Amélie (2001) | L'Absente (2001) |

Amélie is the soundtrack album to the 2001 film of the same name.

Director Jean-Pierre Jeunet was introduced to the accordion and piano-driven music of Yann Tiersen by his production assistant. Greatly impressed, he immediately bought Tiersen's entire catalogue and eventually commissioned him to compose pieces for the film. Before discovering Tiersen, Jeunet wanted composer Michael Nyman to score the film.

The soundtrack features compositions from Tiersen's first three albums, as well as new items, variants of which can be found on his fourth album, L'Absente, which he was writing at the same time.

The music features parts played with accordion, piano, harpsichord, banjo, bass guitar, vibraphone, and even a bicycle wheel at the end of "La Dispute" (which plays over the opening titles in the motion picture).

"Les Jours Tristes", was co-written with Neil Hannon of The Divine Comedy. The track later received English lyrics, and was released by The Divine Comedy as a B-side to the Regeneration single, "Perfect Lovesong". The English-language version also appeared on Tiersen's L'Absente.

"The Child", by Alex Gopher also features on the film soundtrack; however, it is not on this album.

== Track listing ==
All music is composed by Yann Tiersen, except where noted

| No. | Title | Length |
|---|---|---|
| 1. | "J'y suis jamais allé" | 1:34 |
| 2. | "Les Jours tristes" (Instrumental) (written by Tiersen and Neil Hannon) | 3:03 |
| 3. | "La Valse d'Amélie" | 2:15 |
| 4. | "Comptine d'un autre été : L'Après-midi" | 2:20 |
| 5. | "La Noyée" | 2:03 |
| 6. | "L'Autre valse d'Amélie" | 1:33 |
| 7. | "Guilty" (performed by Al Bowlly; written by Gus Kahn; composed by Richard A. Whiting and Harry Akst) | 3:13 |
| 8. | "À quai" | 3:32 |
| 9. | "Le Moulin" | 4:27 |
| 10. | "Pas si simple" | 1:52 |
| 11. | "La Valse d'Amélie" (Version orchestre) | 2:00 |
| 12. | "La Valse des vieux os" | 2:20 |
| 13. | "La Dispute" | 4:15 |
| 14. | "Si tu n'étais pas là" (performed by Fréhel; written by Gaston Claret and Pierre Bayle) | 3:29 |
| 15. | "Soir de fête" | 2:55 |
| 16. | "La Redécouverte" | 1:13 |
| 17. | "Sur le fil" | 4:23 |
| 18. | "Le Banquet" | 1:31 |
| 19. | "La Valse d'Amélie" (Version piano) | 2:38 |
| 20. | "La Valse des monstres" | 3:39 |

French CD bonus tracks
| No. | Title | Length |
|---|---|---|
| 21. | "L'Autre valse d'Amélie" (Version quatuor à cordes et piano) | 1:43 |
| 22. | "Les Deux pianos" | 2:00 |
| 23. | "Comptine d'un autre été : La Démarche" | 2:03 |
| 24. | "La Maison" | 2:03 |

== Personnel ==
Musicians

- Yann Tiersen – piano, toy piano, carillon, banjo, mandolin, guitar, harpsichord, vibraphone, accordion, bass, melodica
- Ensemble Orchestral Synaxis – orchestra on "Les Jours tristes" and "À quai"
- Christine Ott – ondes Martenot on "À quai"
- Christian Quermalet – drums on "Les Jours tristes"

Production

- Uwe Teichert – mastering
- Fabrice Laureau – mixing
- Marc Bruckert – artwork
- Laurent Lufroy – film poster

== Awards and nominations ==
The list is made with information from IMDb.

=== Awards ===
- 2001 — World Soundtrack Award for Best Original Score of the Year
- 2002 — César Award for Best Music Written for a Film

=== Nominations ===
- 2001 — BAFTA Award for Best Film Music
- 2001 — World Soundtrack Award for Soundtrack Composer of the Year
- 2001 — Phoenix Film Critics Society Award for Best Original Soundtrack of the Year

== Charts ==
=== Weekly charts ===
2001–2003 weekly chart performance for Amélie
| Chart (2001–2003) | Peak position |
|---|---|
| Austrian Albums (Ö3 Austria) | 35 |
| Belgian Albums (Ultratop Flanders) | 3 |
| Belgian Albums (Ultratop Wallonia) | 2 |
| Canadian Albums (Nielsen SoundScan) | 65 |
| Dutch Albums (Album Top 100) | 31 |
| European Albums (Music & Media) | 16 |
| French Albums (SNEP) | 1 |
| German Albums (Offizielle Top 100) | 33 |
| Swiss Albums (Schweizer Hitparade) | 28 |
| US World Albums (Billboard) | 2 |

2013 weekly chart performance for Amélie
| Chart (2013) | Peak position |
|---|---|
| Italian Albums (FIMI) | 96 |

Weekly chart performance for "Comptine d'un autre été : L'après-midi"
| Chart (2010–2013) | Peak position |
|---|---|
| Austria (Ö3 Austria Top 40) | 41 |
| France (SNEP) | 187 |
| Germany (GfK) | 47 |
| Switzerland (Schweizer Hitparade) | 34 |

=== Year-end charts ===
2001 year-end chart performance for Amélie
| Chart (2001) | Position |
|---|---|
| Belgian Albums (Ultratop Wallonia) | 18 |
| European Albums (Music & Media) | 61 |
| French Albums (SNEP) | 11 |

2002 year-end chart performance for Amélie
| Chart (2002) | Position |
|---|---|
| Belgian Albums (Ultratop Wallonia) | 40 |
| Canadian Albums (Nielsen SoundScan) | 155 |
| European Albums (Music & Media) | 63 |
| French Albums (SNEP) | 33 |
| US World Albums (Billboard) | 6 |

2003 year-end chart performance for Amélie
| Chart (2003) | Position |
|---|---|
| Belgian Albums (Ultratop Flanders) | 25 |
| Belgian Albums (Ultratop Wallonia) | 65 |
| French Albums (SNEP) | 194 |

== Certifications and sales ==
Certifications and sales for Amélie
| Region | Certification | Certified units/sales |
|---|---|---|
| Belgium (BRMA) | 2× Platinum | 100,000^{*} |
| Canada (Music Canada) | Platinum | 100,000^{^} |
| France (SNEP) | 3× Platinum | 1,000,000 |
| Germany (BVMI) | Gold | 150,000^{^} |
| Greece (IFPI Greece) | Gold | 15,000^{^} |
| Italy (FIMI) | Gold | 30,000^{*} |
| Netherlands (NVPI) | Gold | 15,000^{^} |
| Poland (ZPAV) | Platinum | 100,000^{*} |
| United Kingdom (BPI) | Gold | 100,000^{^} |
| United States | — | 195,000 |
Summaries
| Europe (IFPI) | Platinum | 1,000,000^{*} |
| Worldwide | — | 1,500,000 |
^{*} Sales figures based on certification alone.^{^} Shipments figures based on certification alone.

== Covers ==
The band New Found Glory covered "J'y suis jamais allé" on their second covers album From the Screen to Your Stereo Part II. The song was also used by Expression Crew in their dance act Marionette.

Pianist and composer Dmytro Morykit arranged and plays a cover version of "Comptine d'un autre été : L'après-midi".
