= Têtes Raides =

French folk rock group

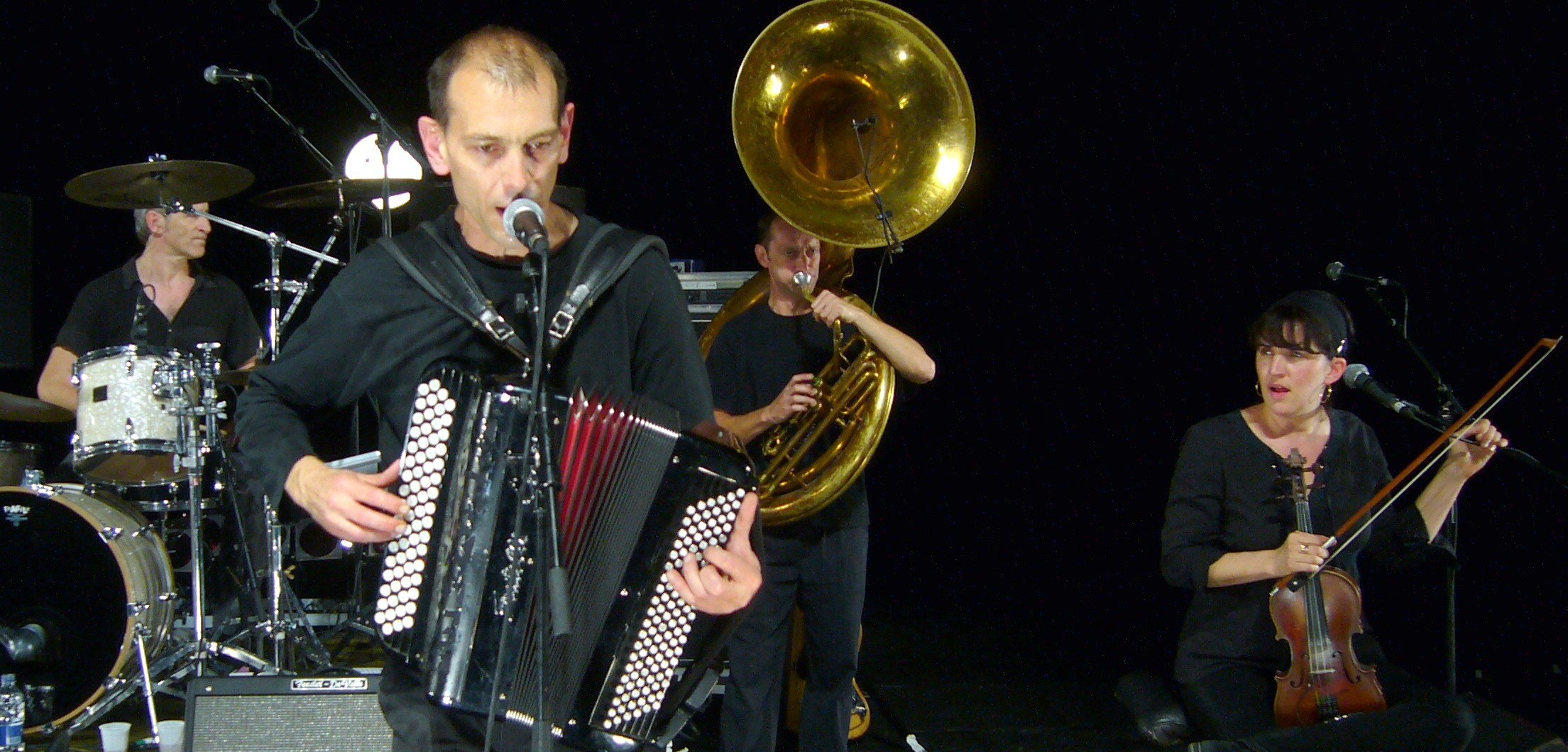

Background information
- Also known as: Red Ted (initially)
- Origin: France
- Genres: Folk rock, punk rock
- Years active: 1984–present
- Labels: Tôt ou tard, La Niche
- Members: Christian Olivier; Grégoire Simon; Pascal Olivier; Anne-Gaëlle Bisquay; Serge Bégout; Édith Bégout; Pierre Gauthé; Jean-Luc Millot; Philippe Guarracino
- Website: www.tetesraides.fr

Têtes Raides is a French folk rock group.

== Group history ==
The group was founded in Paris during the 1980s. Originally, they played music heavily influenced by the punk movement and depended on electric instruments. Their third album featured Anne-Gaëlle, a classically trained cellist, and marked a turning point in the group's music toward a more acoustic sound. The group's later efforts misleadingly take on the air of quotidian folk songs while actually using stunning musical arrangements, experimental soundscapes and poetic lyrics rife with very dark humor.

Listeners find the influence of classic French musicians like Jacques Brel, Georges Brassens and the Négresses Vertes in the later work.

== Group members ==
- Christian Olivier : Voice, accordion, acoustic guitar, graphics
- Grégoire Simon (a.k.a. "Iso") : Saxophone, flute, accordion, voice
- Pascal Olivier (a.k.a. "Cali") : Bass guitar, double bass, Hélicon, tuba, voice (Christian's brother)
- Anne-Gaëlle Bisquay : Cello, violin
- Serge Bégout : Acoustic guitar, baritone saxophone
- Jean-Luc Millot (a.k.a. "Lulu") : drums, voice.
- Édith Bégout (a.k.a. "la p'tite dernière") : Tuba, baseball bat, piano (Serge's sister)

== Discography ==
Studio albums

Year	Album	Peak positions	
Year	Album	FR	BEL (Wa)
1989	Not dead but bien raides	–	–
1989	Mange tes morts	–	–
1992	Les oiseaux	–	–
1993	Fleur de yeux	–	–
1996	Le bout du toit	–	–
1998	Chamboultou	14	–
2000	Gratte poil	23	–
2003	Qu'est-ce qu'on s'fait chier!	5	–
2005	Fragile #	19	–
2007	Banco #	31	–
2011	L'an demain #	8	88
2013	Corps de mots	63	–
2014	Les Terriens	13	–
2021	Bing Bang Boum		

# : Vocals by Sara Mandiano.

Live albums

Year	Album	Peak positions
Year	Album	FR
1997	Viens!	74
2004	28.05.04	48

Compilation albums

- 2000: 10 ans de Têtes Raides
- 2006: Aïe
- 2008: Best Of – 20 ans de Ginette (FR #70)

== Videography ==
- 2003: Têtes Raides aux Bouffes du Nord (filmed live in 2002)
- 2008: Trash live au Bataclan (live filmé en novembre 2006), qu'on retrouve au sein de la compilation 20 ans de Ginette
