= Dominique A =

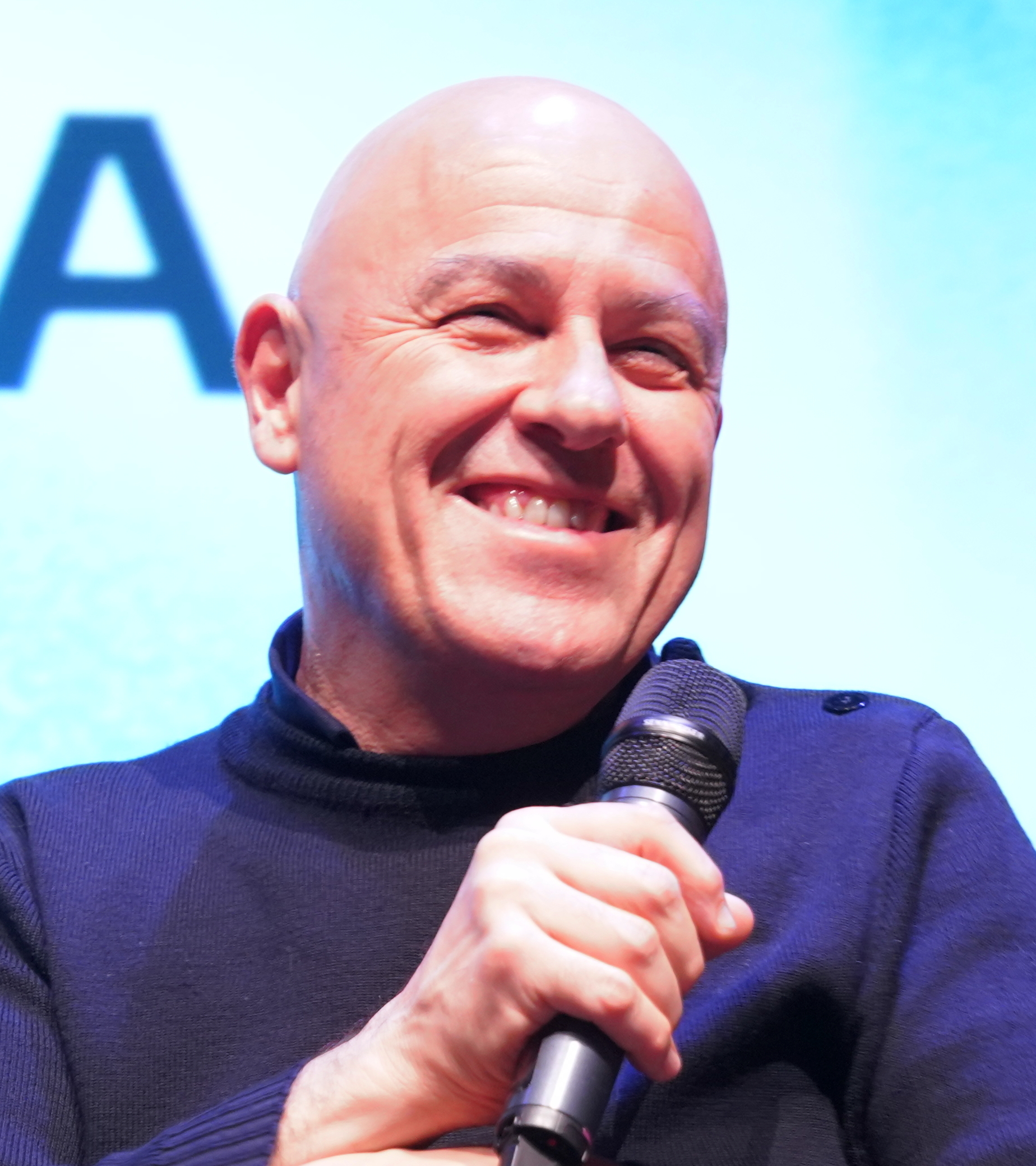
- Dominique A in concert 2025

Background information
- Born: Dominique Ané; 6 October 1968 (age 58); Provins, Île-de-France, France
- Origin: Provins, Île-de-France, France
- Genres: Chanson, alternative rock, indie rock, acoustic rock
- Occupations: Singer, songwriter
- Instruments: Guitar, vocals
- Years active: 1992–present
- Labels: Olympic Disk, Wagram Music
- Website: dominiquea.com

Dominique Ané (French pronunciation: [dɔminik ane]; born 6 October 1968), better known as Dominique A, is a French singer and songwriter.

== Early life ==
Born on 6 October 1968 in Provins, France, Dominique Ané is the only child of a teacher and a homemaker. He was passionate about literature and music from a young age. He was interested in the punk music of the time, but at the age of 14, at the beginning of the 1980s, he started to appreciate the dark romanticism of the new wave movement. After his baccalaureate, he studied humanities for a year, and, at the same time, did a range of odd jobs, including his spell as a utility man for an FM radio station in Nantes, where his family lived. At around the age of 16, he started up a band, John Merrick, named after the hero of the film The Elephant Man, a movie by David Lynch.

The foursome recorded a vinyl album of somber, tormented songs and gave a number of concerts in the area around Nantes. Later, with the singer Katerine, he recorded a number of songs, in a different, more upbeat and livelier style.

== Beginning of a career ==
Dominique began, at the start of the 1990s, to record more songs, which were both minimalist and rock in style. He wanted to break with the traditional chanson, which he considered to be more literary than musical. Dominique's influences included the bands Orchestral Manoeuvres in the Dark and Suicide.

Dominique's first CD, released by the Nantes label, Lithium, met with critical acclaim, appreciated by the eminent alternative magazine, Les Inrockuptibles, and by Bernard Lenoir, the 'John Peel' of France. Furthermore, his song, Le Courage des oiseaux, (the Courage of the Birds), was an underground hit.

From 1992 onwards, he started to produce more and more live shows, either with a backing band, or solo. His commercial success grew in 1995, with Le twenty-two bar, a single off the album, La Mémoire Neuve, but this success left a bitter taste in Dominique's mouth, as he considered the song to be particularly badly written.

In 2000, he composed the score for Antoine Desrosières' black comedy film Banqueroute.

In 2001, on the album Auguri produced by John Parish, Dominique covered a song by the group Polyphonic Size, Je t'ai Toujours Aimee.

== Le Détour and beyond (2002–) ==
Dominique's discovery of Alain Bashung's dark 2002 album, L'Imprudence shocked him to the point that it put his music into question and he decided to explore different ways of working. He decided to compile what he considered to be the first part of a musical time capsule, a longbox entitled Le Détour. He asked his fans to write about their relationship with his music, and some of their letters were published in the booklet accompanying Le Détour.

For his subsequent album, he wanted to experiment and consequently, for the first time, he gave control over the album to a third party, the team who produced L'Imprudence. The result would be Tout sera comme avant (Everything will be like it was before), which was released in 2004. Unfortunately, many fans had difficulty understanding and accepting the musical change the album represents. At the same time, Dominique did a lot of live shows, with diverse arrangements: with a big band, with minimalistic backing, or all alone (where he would experiment with oversampling).

In March 2006, L'Horizon came out, a new work that he produced alongside Dominique Brusson, with whom he had made the early album, Remué. It was the first time that Dominique A returned to work with a producer. He was backed by his old collaborators, Sacha Toorop and Olivier Mellano, as well as the musicians with whom he produced Tout sera comme avant.

== Collaboration and influence ==
Dominique A collaborates regularly with other artists and on other projects. He has been one of the shaping forces of his former girlfriend and French pop star Françoiz Breut's career, writing many of her songs since her début in 1997. He has also composed several songs for Jeanne Balibar's second album, Slalom Dale and wrote Où est la ville ? for Jane Birkin's 2006 album, Fictions. He has also sung the song Veruca Salt et Frank Black in trio with Keren Ann and Vincent Delerm on the latter's second album, Kensington Square.

Dominique A has inspired and influenced many artists. He has influenced many instrumentalist artists, such as Yann Tiersen and the electro band, Oslo Telescopic, who named one of their albums The Dominique O Project. Lyrically, his movement away from the constraints of chanson moved many others- including Miossec, Holden and Arman Méliès – by showing them that it was possible to make music that reflected their tastes and feelings using French.

== Discography ==
=== Studio albums ===
- Le Disque sourd (1991)
- La Fossette (1992, Lithium)
- Si Je Connais Harry (1993, Lithium)
- La Mémoire Neuve (1995, Lithium)
- Remué (1999, Lithium)
- Auguri (2001, Labels)
- Tout Sera Comme Avant (2004, Labels)
- L'Horizon (2006, Olympic Disk)
- La Musique (2009)
- Vers les lueurs (2012)
- Éléor. (2015)
- Toute latitude (2018)
- La Fragilité (2018)
- Vie étrange (2020)
- Le Monde réel (2022)
- Reflets du Monde Lointain (2023)
- Spirales (2026)

=== Live albums ===
- Sur nos forces motrices (2007, Olympic Disk)

=== Box set ===
- Le Détour 3CD (2002, Labels)

=== Singles ===
- "Au revoir mon amour" (2015)

== Decorations ==
- Officer of the Order of Arts and Letters (2016)
