= Fire Station No. 7 =

Fire Station No. 7, and variations such as Engine House No. 7, may refer to:

- Fire Station No. 7 (Denver, Colorado), a Denver Landmark
- Fire Station No. 7 (South Bend, Indiana)
- Fire Station No. 7 (Brookline, Massachusetts)
- Pocasset Firehouse No. 7, Fall River, Massachusetts
- Engine House No. 7 (Columbus, Ohio), on the Columbus Register of Historic Properties
- Houston Fire Station No. 7, Houston, Texas, now the Houston Fire Museum
- Engine House No. 7 (Washington, D.C.)

== See also ==
- List of fire stations
