= London Film Critics Circle Awards 2007 =

British film awards ceremony

28th London Film Critics Circle Awards

8 February 2008

Film of the Year:
No Country for Old Men

British Film of the Year:
Control

The 28th London Film Critics Circle Awards, honouring the best in film for 2007, were announced by the London Film Critics Circle on 8 February 2008.

== Winners and nominees ==
=== Film of the Year ===
No Country for Old Men

- The Assassination of Jesse James by the Coward Robert Ford
- The Bourne Ultimatum
- There Will Be Blood
- Zodiac

=== British Film of the Year ===
Control

- Atonement
- Eastern Promises
- Mr. Magorium's Wonder Emporium
- This Is England

=== Foreign Language Film of the Year ===
The Lives of Others • Germany

- 4 Months, 3 Weeks and 2 Days • Romania
- The Diving Bell and the Butterfly • France
- Letters from Iwo Jima • United States
- Tell No One • France

=== Director of the Year ===
Paul Thomas Anderson – There Will Be Blood

- Joel Coen & Ethan Coen – No Country for Old Men
- David Fincher – Zodiac
- Florian Henckel von Donnersmarck – The Lives of Others
- Cristian Mungiu – 4 Months, 3 Weeks and 2 Days

=== British Director of the Year ===
Paul Greengrass – The Bourne Ultimatum

- Danny Boyle – Sunshine
- Anton Corbijn – Control
- Shane Meadows – This Is England
- Joe Wright – Atonement

=== Screenwriter of the Year ===
Florian Henckel von Donnersmarck – The Lives of Others

- Christopher Hampton – Atonement
- Ronald Harwood – The Diving Bell and the Butterfly
- Joel Coen & Ethan Coen – No Country for Old Men
- Paul Thomas Anderson – There Will Be Blood

=== British Breakthrough – Filmmaking ===
Anton Corbijn, director – Control

- John Carney, writer and director – Once
- Sarah Gavron, director – Brick Lane
- Matt Greenhalgh, writer – Control
- Stevan Riley, writer, director, producer – Blue Blood

=== Actor of the Year ===
Daniel Day-Lewis – There Will Be Blood

- Casey Affleck – The Assassination of Jesse James by the Coward Robert Ford
- George Clooney – Michael Clayton
- Tommy Lee Jones – In the Valley of Elah
- Ulrich Mühe – The Lives of Others

=== Actress of the Year ===
Marion Cotillard – La Vie en Rose

- Maggie Gyllenhaal – Sherrybaby
- Angelina Jolie – A Mighty Heart
- Laura Linney – The Savages
- Anamaria Marinca – 4 Months, 3 Weeks and 2 Days

=== British Actor of the Year ===
James McAvoy – Atonement

- Christian Bale – 3:10 to Yuma
- Jim Broadbent – And When Did You Last See Your Father?
- Jonny Lee Miller – The Flying Scotsman
- Sam Riley – Control

=== British Actress of the Year ===
Julie Christie – Away from Her

- Helena Bonham Carter – Sweeney Todd: The Demon Barber of Fleet Street
- Keira Knightley – Atonement
- Sienna Miller – Interview
- Samantha Morton – Control

=== British Supporting Actor of the Year ===
Tom Wilkinson – Michael Clayton

- Albert Finney – Before the Devil Knows You're Dead
- Toby Jones – The Painted Veil
- Toby Kebbell – Control
- Alfred Molina – The Hoax

=== British Supporting Actress of the Year ===
Kelly Macdonald – No Country for Old Men
Vanessa Redgrave – Atonement

- Saoirse Ronan – Atonement
- Imelda Staunton – Harry Potter and the Order of the Phoenix
- Tilda Swinton – Michael Clayton

=== British Breakthrough – Acting ===
Sam Riley – Control

- Benedict Cumberbatch – Amazing Grace
- Dakota Blue Richards – The Golden Compass
- Saoirse Ronan – Atonement
- Thomas Turgoose – This Is England

=== Dilys Powell Award ===
- Julie Walters
