= Robb LaKritz =

American lawyer

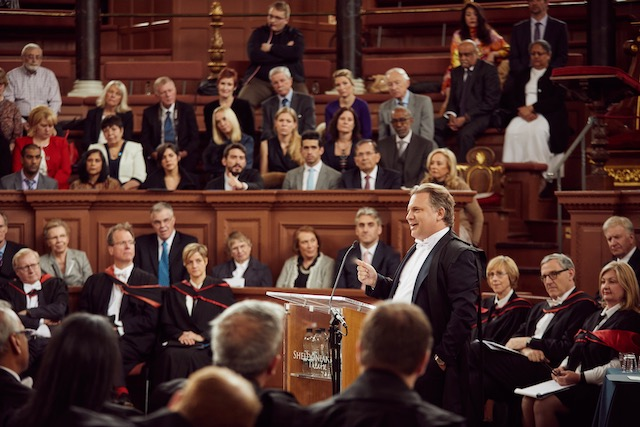
- Born: Robb Michael LaKritz; 1972 (age 53–54)
- Education: University of Michigan (BA); Emory University (JD); Worcester College, Oxford (MBA)
- Organization(s): LaKritz Holdings, LLC; Chief Executive Officer
- Known for: Advisor to the Deputy U.S. Treasury Secretary (2001–2003)

Robb Michael LaKritz (born 1972) is an American real estate investor and former U.S. economic policymaker. LaKritz is Chief Executive Officer of LaKritz Holdings LLC, a diversified holding company. Previously, LaKritz was appointed by U.S. President George W. Bush as Advisor to the Deputy Secretary of United States Treasury, and named by the Wall Street Journal to its Future of Finance Initiative, a bipartisan group of high-ranking economic policy officials from five U.S. presidential administrations. LaKritz is an alumnus of Oxford University.

== Early life and education ==
LaKritz was raised in Bloomfield Hills, Michigan. The eldest of three siblings and only son of a prominent Michigan attorney and former kindergarten teacher, LaKritz attended Andover High School, where he was a three-sport varsity athlete in baseball, hockey, and golf.

LaKritz attended the University of Michigan, graduating summa cum laude and Phi Beta Kappa with a B.A. in Political Science, and being admitted to four national honorary societies for his work in international relations, political science, psychology, and the humanities.

LaKritz then earned a Juris Doctor from Emory University, and was on the Emory International Law Review. During law school, LaKritz also worked at the Carter Presidential Center and studied law at East China University of Political Science and Law in Shanghai, becoming among the first Western law students to study Chinese law in the People's Republic of China. On his return to Emory University in 1996, LaKritz was honored as a Dean's Teaching Fellow for his legal scholarship on Chinese law and philosophy.

LaKritz completed his formal education at the University of Oxford, where he earned his M.B.A. with distinction, and was a member of Worcester College, the Oxford Union, and the Oxford University Amateur Boxing Club. LaKritz also was chosen to deliver the final closing ceremony address to his graduating Oxford M.B.A. class.

== Government and law ==
LaKritz began his career with the Washington, D.C. law firm of Baker Donelson, working in the firm's International practice, which included former U.S. Secretary of State Lawrence Eagleburger and former White House Chief of Staff and U.S. Senate Majority Leader Howard Baker.

In 2001, LaKritz was appointed by U.S. President George W. Bush as Advisor to the Deputy Secretary of the United States Treasury, a senior U.S. economic policymaking role. At Treasury, LaKritz helped direct U.S. domestic economic policy and U.S. international economic policy, particularly with regard to China. He represented the U.S. Treasury at the World Economic Forum in 2002, Harvard's Symposium on Building the Financial System of the 21st century, and during the 2001 and 2002 annual meetings of the World Bank, the International Monetary Fund, and the Asian Development Bank. He was involved in the formation of the Millennium Challenge Account (MCA), a fund established by the U.S. government to reduce poverty through economic growth in some of the world's poorest countries; U.S. efforts to stem the financing of terrorism; and U.S. efforts to promote financial stability abroad. In March 2009, he was named by the Wall Street Journal to its Future of Finance Initiative, along with other senior-ranking economic officials from five prior United States Presidential administrations.

== Business ==
In 2004, LaKritz and fellow U.S. Treasury alumnus Joshua Adler founded LaKritz Adler Development, LLC, a real estate development company focused on revitalizing areas of the U.S. capital. After purchasing its first property at 1525 9th Street NW, the historic home of Watha T. Daniel, the company grew rapidly during the first decade of the twenty-first century. Its projects included the redevelopment of Dupont Circle's historic Starbucks Building, which houses the first Starbucks opened in the eastern United States. LaKritz Adler acquired the landmark building in 2010 for $4 million, redeveloped and expanded it, and later sold it for $16.25 million in a private auction that was reported to have set the all-time record for highest price per square foot ever paid for a retail building in Washington, D.C. Lakritz Adler's other projects in the Dupont Circle and Georgetown neighborhoods included the Veritas Building, another historical redevelopment, and 5185 MacArthur, the largest mixed-use building in Georgetown's tony Foxhall area.

Throughout the 2000s, LaKritz Adler also played a prominent role in the development of Washington, D.C.'s high-end luxury condominium market: Its Moderno project was the fastest selling condominium project in Washington, D.C., in 2009. It also was an early champion of the redevelopment of Georgia Avenue, Washington, D.C.'s longest commercial boulevard. LaKritz Adler opened Temperance Hall, Georgia Avenue's first sit-down restaurant in more than fifty years, and it later developed Petworth Station, which brought a full-service pharmacy back to the Petworth section of Washington, D.C. for the first time in decades. The firm's projects have been profiled in the Washington Post, Washington Times, Washington Business Journal, Washington City Paper, DC Spaces Magazine, DC Modern Luxury, OnSite Magazine, and on Fox5 News.

LaKritz was named one of the most influential people under 40 in the nation's capitol by Washington Life Magazine. He has been a director on the board of the Washington, D.C. Chapter of the Entrepreneurs' Organization, as well as a member of the 2008 Class of Leadership Greater Washington, District of Columbia Bar Association, Urban Land Institute, D.C. Preservation League and D.C. Building Industry Association. He also has been an annual participant in the Aspen Institute Ideas Festival and TED since 2004.
