= Harvard Boxing Club =

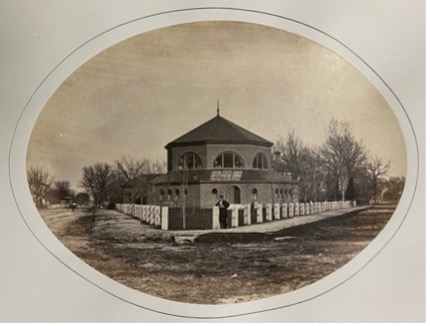
Harvard Gymnasium (1858-1878) on Cambridge Street and Broadway, Cambridge, Massachusetts

The Harvard Boxing Club is a student organization at Harvard University in Cambridge, Massachusetts.

== History ==
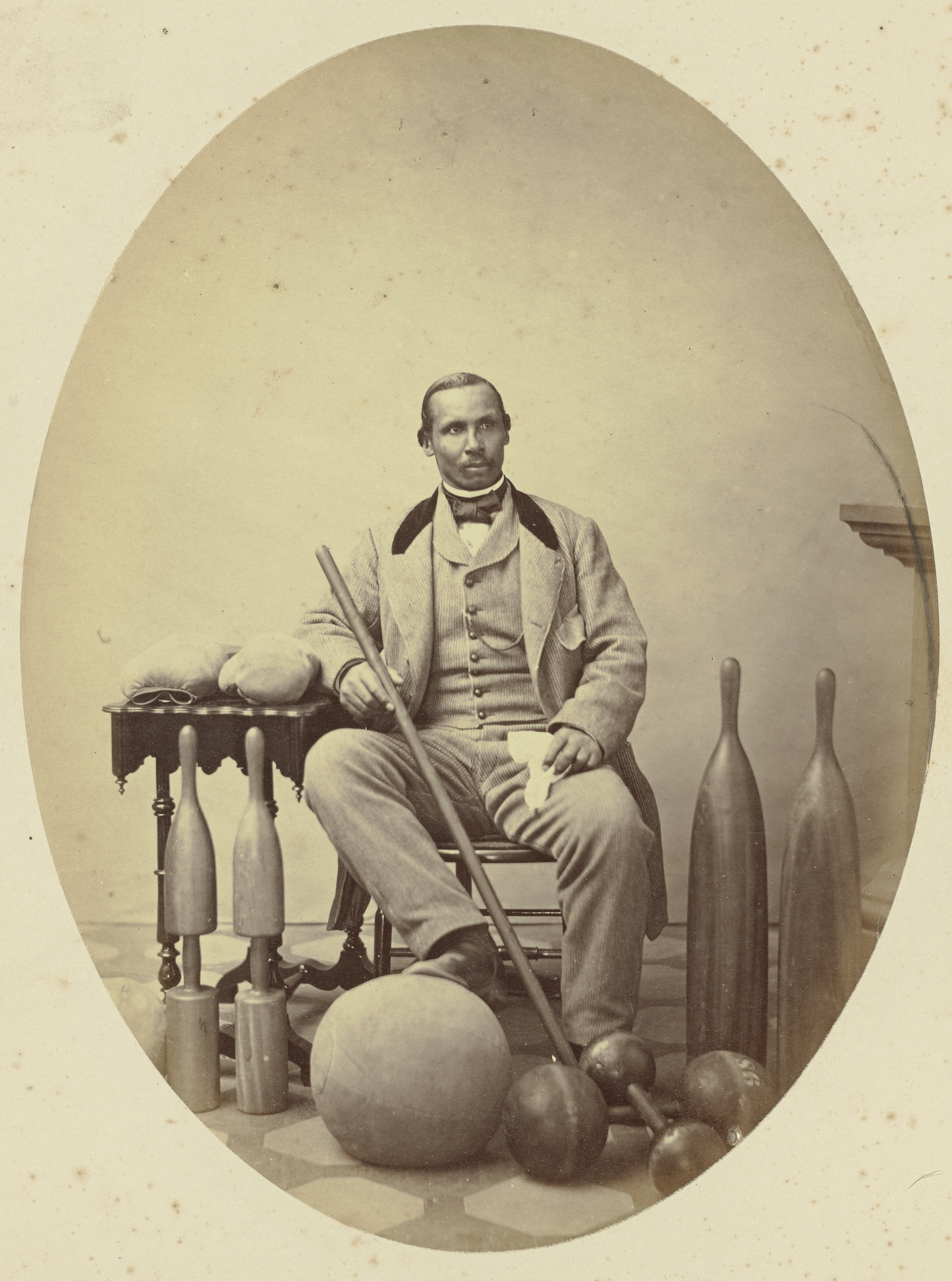
Hewlett with boxing gloves and other exercise equipment.

Boxing has been a popular campus activity since the mid 19th century. It was first documented by Boston newspapers citing Harvard students attending Professor Paton Stewart Jr. "Boston Gymnasium" on Tremont Street in Boston, and later attending Mr. Stewart's "Harvard Gymnasium" on Palmer Street in Cambridge.

With the opening of the first official Harvard Gymnasium in 1859, Professor Aaron Molyneaux Hewlett was hired as the first physical exercises instructor and gymnasium superintendent. Hewlett brought his own system that included a mix of English and German gymnastics, Indian Clubs, weights, medicine balls and Boxing. Sparring fees with Professor Hewlett were $8 per year in 1859. The first documented Harvard Boxing photographs were captured by George Kendall Warren in 1860.

In 1871 after Hewlett’s passing, sparring master John B. Bailey became the boxing instructor, and Frederick W. Lister the superintendent at the College gymnasium until 1878.

Athletics gained momentum at Harvard and in 1878 a larger facility was open as the Hemenway Gymnasium ran by Dudley Allen Sargent. In the intramural tournament of 1879, future President Theodore Roosevelt faced C.S. Hanks in the lightweight championship and lost, after a controversial late hit by Hanks. According to historian Edmund Morris, the crowd started booing Hanks, prompting Roosevelt to put up his hands and shout “It's alright, he didn’t hear [the bell]”. When Roosevelt campaigned for the Presidency, his supporters would frequently recall this anecdote as an early example of his extraordinary character.

Boxing became an official varsity sport in 1922, per recommendation of the Harvard Athletic Committee, and Harvard boxers performed well against their Ivy League opponents (amassing a 25:11:4 record from 1930 to 1937). The team expanded during World War II, when all undergraduates were required to participate in intercollegiate boxing training as a way of improving wartime fitness.

In 1961, the NCAA decided to discontinue boxing as an intercollegiate sport and the Harvard Boxing Team was replaced by the Harvard Boxing Club. Intramural tournaments continued until 1976 when Harvard banned them due to riotous crowd attendance, leaving the Harvard Boxing Club (in its current form) as the last remnant of the college’s proud boxing tradition.

Notable coaches include Tommy Rawson, national amateur junior lightweight champion in 1929, who coached boxers such as Rocky Marciano, and coached at Harvard for 60 years from 1941-2001.

== Gallery ==
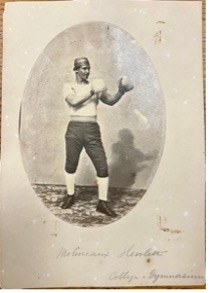
Hewlett boxing

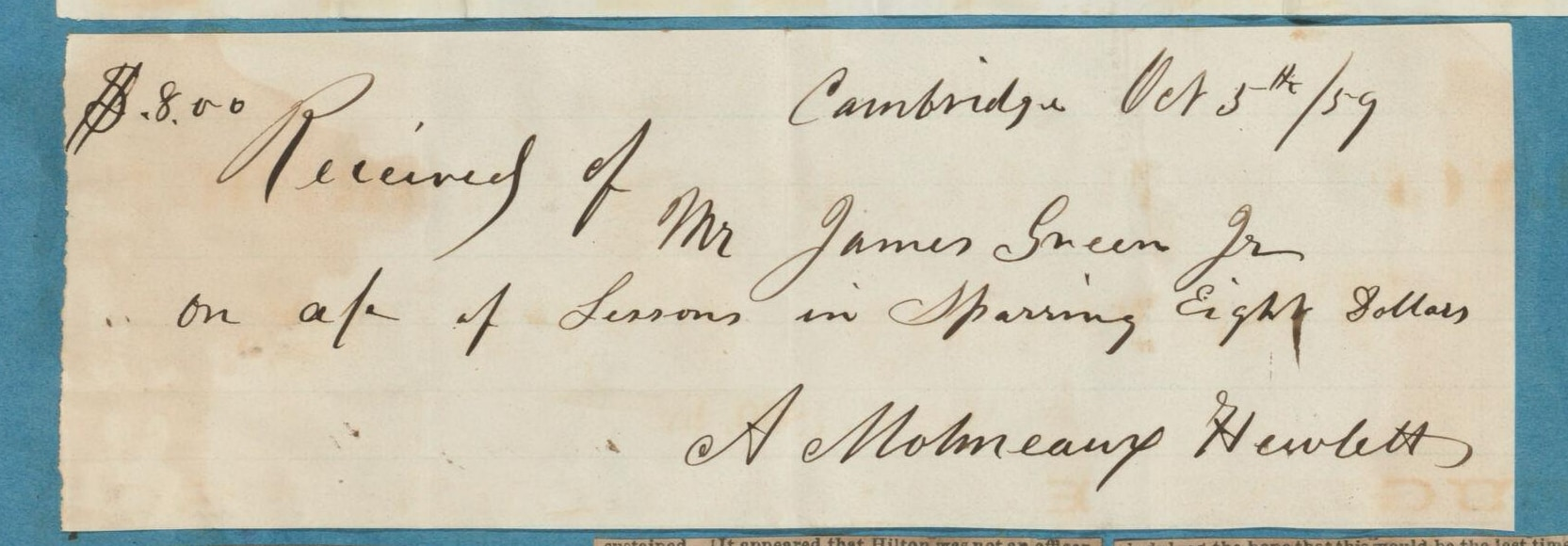
Hewlett's sparring lessons receipt

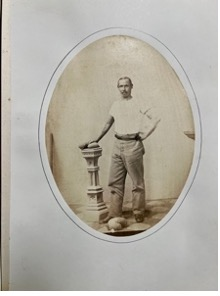
Hewlett with boxing gloves

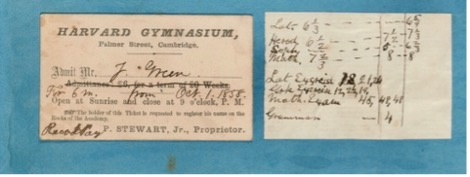
James Green’s membership card to Harvard Gymnasium

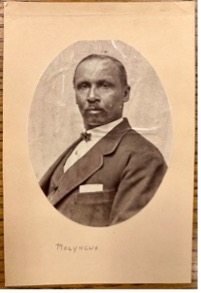
Portrait of Hewlett

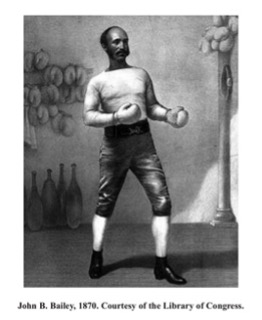
Portrait of John B. Bailey

== Today ==
The Harvard Boxing Club currently includes several dozen members, many of whom participate in the annual Harvard Boxing Club Exhibition Night (a tradition that was revived in 2009). The Club is now co-ed (since the merging of Harvard and Radcliffe College) and includes both undergraduates and graduates.

The Harvard Boxing Club is managed by one undergraduate President and four undergraduate Captains supported by graduate and alumni advisors. The Harvard Boxing Club is coached by former title-holding amateur fighter, Joe Lake, who assumed the position in 2024 after naming his predecessor, Doug Yoffe, Coach Emeritus, who assumed the position in 2001. Yoffe replaced Tommy Rawson—former national amateur lightweight champion (with a 223-4 amateur record), former chairman of the Massachusetts Boxing Commission, and one-time trainer of boxing legend Rocky Marciano. Rawson had been “Coach” since 1941.

== Notable members ==
- Theodore Roosevelt, 26th President of the United States, Medal of Honor, Nobel Peace Prize
- John F. Kennedy, 35th President of the United States
- Thomas Mesereau, legal counsel for Michael Jackson in 2005 child molestation trial
- Fred Joseph, CEO of Drexel Burnham Lambert (HBC 1959)
- Gerard Leone, District Attorney of Middlesex County, Massachusetts
- Alan Jay Lerner, lyricist, winner of three Tony Awards and three Academy Awards
- Joy Liu, winner of the New England Golden Gloves (Women’s Lightweight Novice Division) (HBC 1999)
- Alex Angarita, contestant on Survivor: Fiji (HBC 2003)
- Rosalie Parker, US Amateur Women's Flyweight Champion
- Patrick Rettig, winner of the Greater Lowell Golden Gloves (Men’s Heavyweight Novice Division) (HBC 2000)
- Norman Mailer, Pulitzer-Prize winning author of The Armies of the Night and The Executioner's Song
- Anthony Braga, Professor of Criminology at University of Pennsylvania (HBC 1999)
- Michelle Rhee, Chancellor of D.C. Public Schools, Founder of StudentsFirst (HBC 1999)

== See also ==
- Oxford University Amateur Boxing Club
- Cambridge University Amateur Boxing Club
