= Stefan Wesołowski =

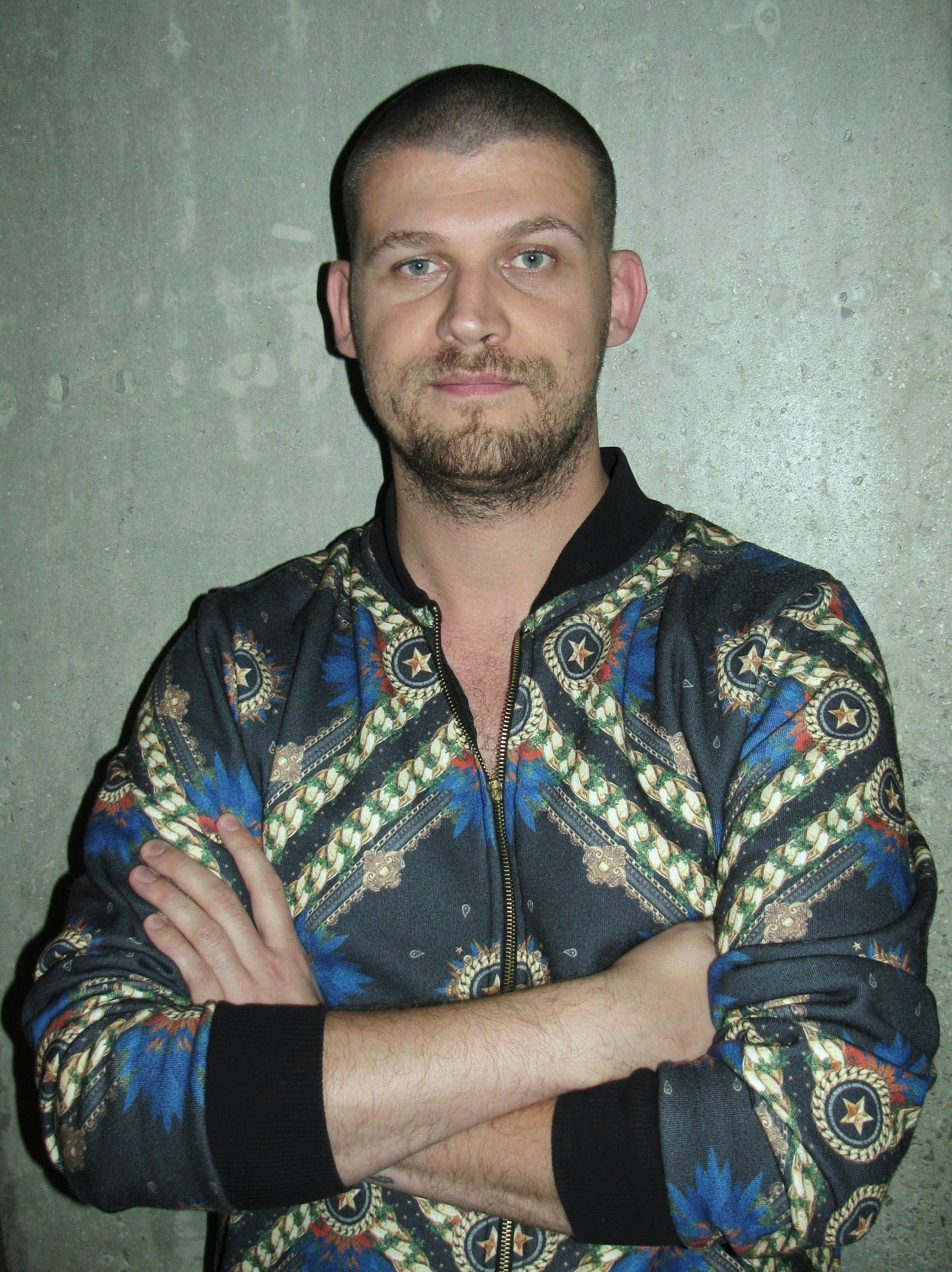
- Stefan Wesołowski

Background information
- Born: March 11, 1985 (age 41); Gdynia, Poland
- Origin: Gdańsk, Poland
- Occupations: composer, violinist
- Instruments: Violin
- Years active: 2001–present
- Labels: Important Records; Ici, d'ailleurs...; Mute Records
- Website: stefanwesolowski.com

Stefan Wesołowski is a Polish composer, producer. He is currently working with an American record label Important Records, French label Ici, d'ailleurs... and a British publisher Mute Song. His work combines classical instruments with modified electronics, generating poignant, detailed and richly orchestrated compositions. Wesołowski lives and works in Gdańsk, Poland.

== Early life and education ==
Wesołowski was born in Gdynia, and raised in Gdańsk. Wesołowski is classical trained violinist and chamber music performer, graduate of Academie Musicale de Villecroze in the class of legendary pianist Emanuel Ax.

== Career ==
In 2008, Wesołowski released his first record as a solo artist, Kompleta. It was a work composed to breviary prayers and hymns for two voices, string quartet and electronics, which featured contribution by Jacaszek. A re-edition of the album in LP/CD/Digital formats was released and distributed worldwide in May 2015 by a French label Ici, d'ailleurs....

Wesołowski's next album Liebestod was first presented to the audience in October 2013 at Unsound Festival. Published by Important Records, the material was enthusiastically received by international critics. An influential American portal Indie Shuffle described the album as real dope, a Canadian magazine Textura reviewed it as provocative, surprising and moving

Wesołowski has also participated in a number of joint projects. For many years he closely collaborated with Jacaszek. He was the author of instrumental parts on the albums Treny and Pentral. Stefan Wesołowski is also an author of original music to numerous theatre plays, art installations and films.

He is the author of original theme music to Listen to Me Marlon by Stevan Riley - a BAFTA-nominated and OSCAR-shortlisted documentary film on Marlon Brando, produced by Universal and Passion Pictures for Showtime, which had its world premiere in January 2015 at Sundance Festival

"Rite of the End" has its pre-premiere show in (Le) Poisson Rouge, most prominent New York venue. The album was also named one of the most exciting performances at SXSW Festival 2019 The album was awarded Album of the Year 2017 in Poland after voting of 60 most prominent Polish music journalists.

== Discography ==
=== Solo albums ===
- Kompleta (Pointa/Gusstaff, 2008); re-edition (Ici, d'ailleurs..., 2015)
- Liebestod (Important Records, 2013)
- Rite of the End (2017)

=== Collaborations ===
- Jacaszek Treny (Miasmah, 2008)
- Jacaszek Pentral (Gusstaff, 2009)
- Wesołowski/Kaliski 281011 (Few Quiet People, 2011)

=== Film scores and soundtracks ===
- Golgota wrocławska (2008, string arrangement)
- Suicide Room (2011, string arrangement)
- Listen to Me Marlon (2015, original theme music)
- Love Express. The Disappearance of Walerian Borowczyk (2018, composer)
- Pilsudski(2019)
- Wolf (2021)
