= Craig A. Kraft =

American sculptor (born 1949)

- Born: Craig Allan Kraft; December 7, 1949; Ames, IA
- Education: American School of Neon in Minneapolis, MN
- Known for: Sculpture, Neon
- Notable work: Lightweb (2004), Silver Spring, MD; Untitled [Arlington Arts Center] (2005), Arlington, VA; Crossroads (2006), Rockville, MD 'VivaceShaw Library, Washington, D.C.

Craig A. Kraft (born Craig Allan Kraft; born on December 7, 1949) is an American sculptor. Over the course of his career, Kraft has gained national recognition for his neon light works, establishing him as one of the leading neon sculptors of today. In his earlier works, such as Seated/Unseated Woman and Light Figure Fragment, Kraft rendered sculptures incorporating details in neon. Since 2000, the main focus of Kraft's art has been privately commissioned pieces, such as Connective Ascension, and monumental public art works, such as Lightweb in Downtown Silver Spring, MD, that are abstract pieces made from rolled aluminum and neon tubing.

Kraft's sculptures have been featured in over 120 exhibits throughout the United States, including fifteen solo exhibitions, fifteen public art installations, and in various international art exhibitions. He has twice been featured as an artist at the International Sculpture Conference and has been a member of the faculty of the Smithsonian Institution Studio Arts Program since 1992. His work has been published in over 25 books, magazine articles, and newspaper articles. His work can be found in the permanent collection of the Museum of Neon Art (MONA).

Craig Kraft is known for working from his firehouse studio in Washington, D.C. The firehouse, formerly Engine House No. 7, is a historic property in Washington that boasts having been home to the first all-black fire company in the District. He currently runs a studio out of Anacostia Washington, D.C.

== Artistic career ==
=== Early life and education/training ===
Craig Kraft was born on December 7, 1949, in Ames, IA. During college and graduate school, Kraft's interests laid primarily in the sciences. As a student at the University of Wisconsin-Madison, Kraft received his B.S. in zoology in 1971, followed by an M.A. in Environmental Education and Science in 1974. It was not until two years after he finished his master's degree that Kraft began developing his skills as a visual artist. In 1976 Kraft moved to New Orleans, LA, and started to model, cast, and paint the figure in clay. Neon was not included as a medium in his works until 1983 when Kraft began attending classes at the newly opened American School of Neon in Minneapolis, MN, which taught working with neon not as a commercial tool but as a means of artistic expression. In 1989 he studied at the Atlantic Center for the Arts in New Smyrna Beach, FL, with Stephen Antonakos, whom Kraft still considers one of his major influences.

=== Philosophy ===
Craig Kraft's philosophy towards making art lies in his belief that a piece of art must work synergistically with its site; art and architecture must function together in harmony. He believes that an artist must consider the site the same way in which he views the art, for every place he puts an object affects how others view it just as much as the appearance of the object itself. As such, art must grow organically from the site, incorporating the different elements of the architecture aesthetically as well as culturally. In his own words, Kraft is “inspired by the site in public art and by close examination of form, color, and light in general. Works are made from scratch—little preconceived notions about the final outcomes. [I work with] one decision leading to another, always looking ahead as to how all the media (the aluminum, the neon, and the surroundings) work together as a whole."

=== Teaching ===
After spending a nearly a decade learning to use neon in the service of art, Kraft began to spend some of his time teaching others the craft of neon. While many artists resist sharing their specific (and often secret) techniques to others, Kraft has always enjoyed teaching eager students the skills and perspectives that he has gained over the years. Since 1992 Kraft has been a member of the faculty of the Smithsonian Institution Studio Arts Program and has offered private neon workshops at his studio.

=== Artistic style ===
Kraft's work is best described as abstract in style with references to the figure and to nature in general. While some believe that his greatest influences are "the illuminated works of Cork Marcheschi, Stephen Antonakos, Dan Flavin and Keith Sonnier," Kraft believes that the real impetus for his work to be the unique desire and structural challenge to fully integrate architecture with art.

== Works ==
=== Early works ===
In the beginning of his career, Kraft worked with modeling the figure in clay, using traditional methods and traditional subjects. But, by the early 1980s he began to find his work becoming monotonous, and looked towards the newly opened American School of Neon in Minneapolis, MN for inspiration. The philosophy of the school was to treat neon as a sculptural medium rather than merely a medium for commercial signage. Kraft was able to manipulate the neon in order to integrate it with his fragmented, sequenced figurative work. The colored lights added a certain volume, experience, and mood to the work that Kraft found previously lacking.

Many of these early works feature sections of plaster casts of models attached to canvas, backlit with neon. Kraft enjoyed "the personal aspect of body casting, and the shared beauty of the certain aspect of the human form and condition." The neon tubing is often concealed in his sculptures, either by hiding the tube within the cast or by painting the tube black and scratching out sections of paint to direct the flow of light onto the figures, giving the sculpture the appearance of a mysterious colored glow. Of Kraft's early work, "a common theme…a theme that immediately holds a peruser's eyes hostage—is the seemingly partial emergence of a human figure from the canvas, made all the more captivating by the strategically placed neon backlighting that appears to serve as the portal for the bas-relief segment of the work."

Kraft is currently “one of only a handful of light artists in the world who bends his own glass and is respected for his ability to precisely manipulate the figure and light to capture his own artistic vision."

=== Career ===
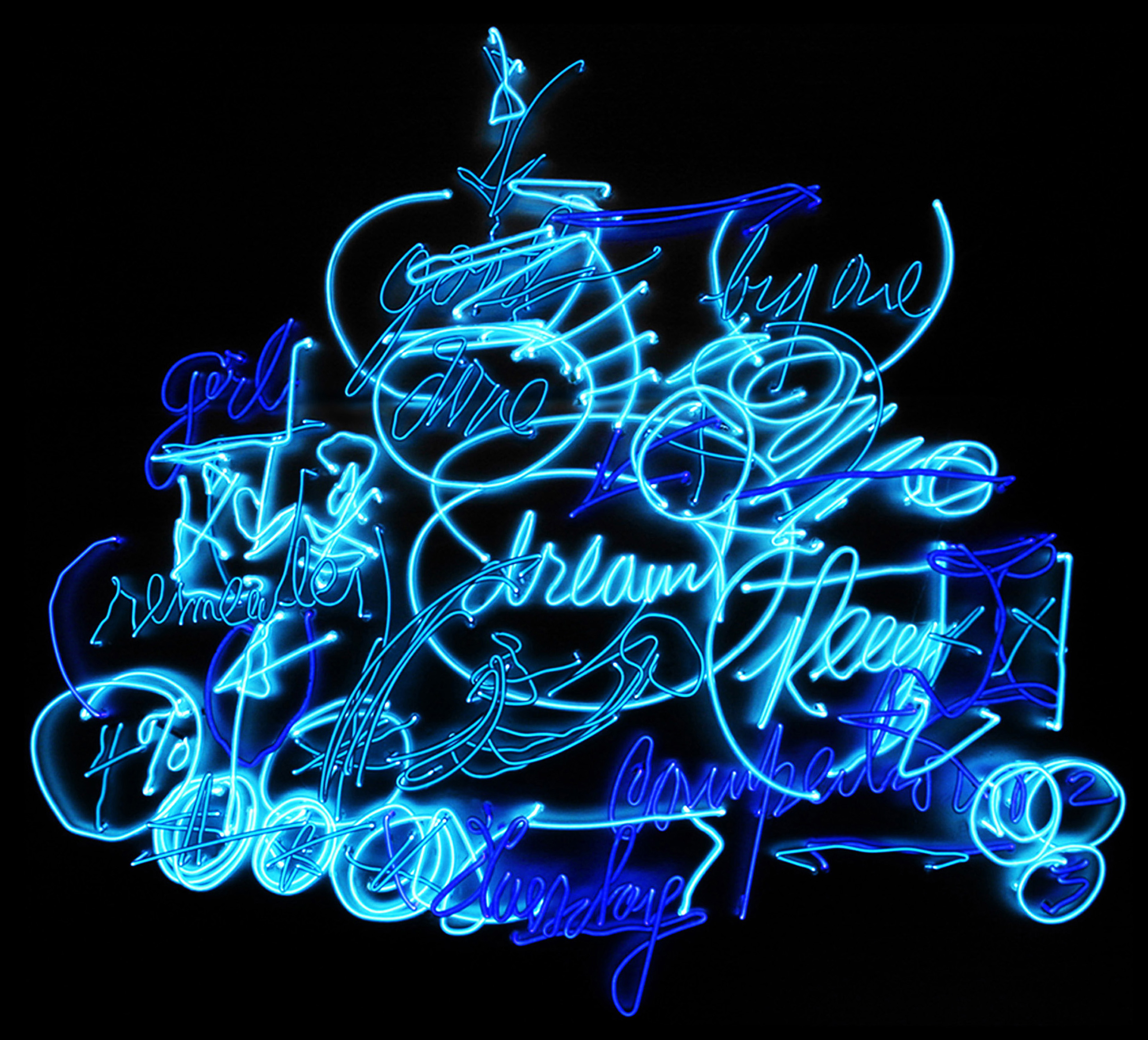

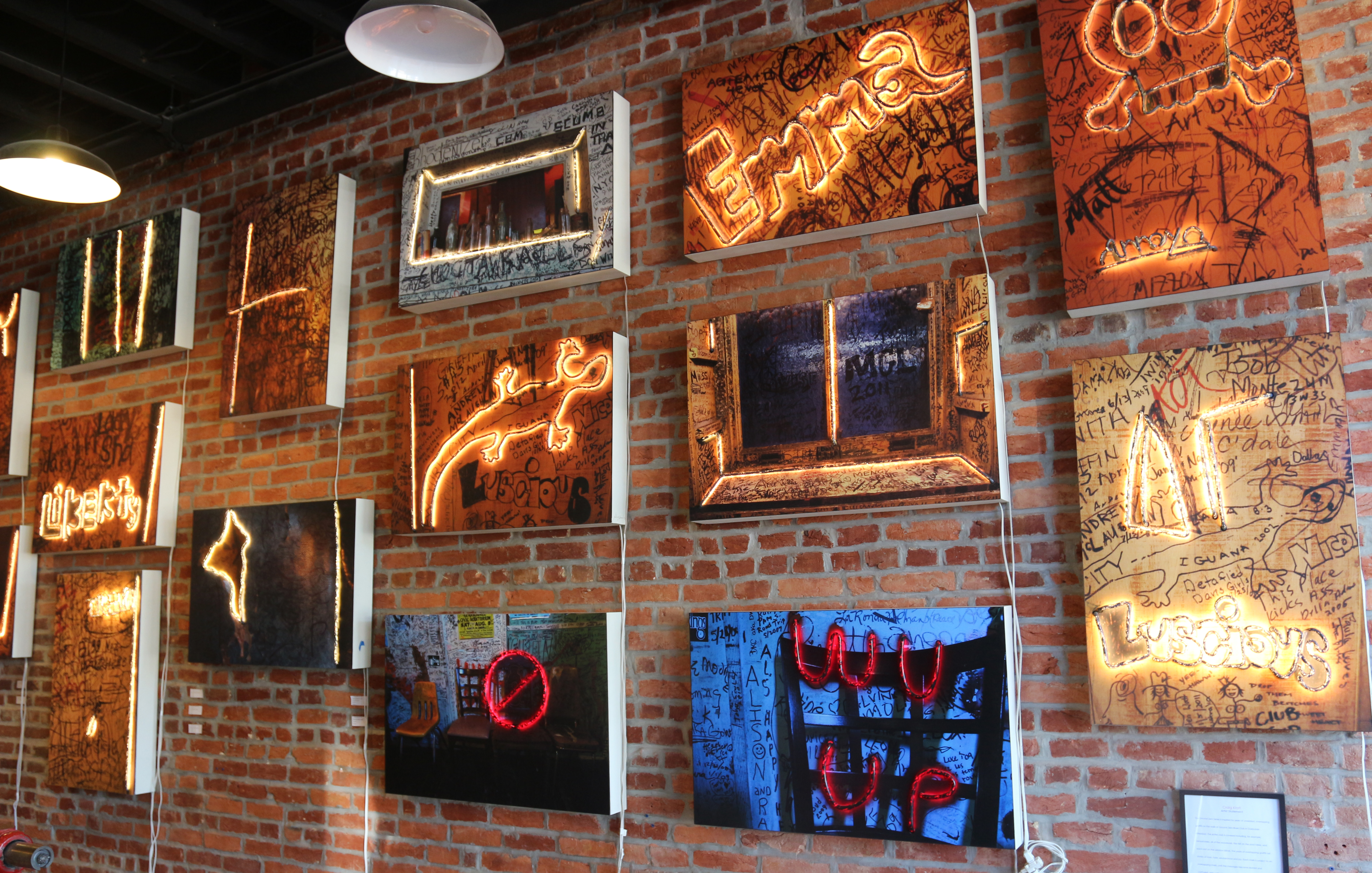

Krafts career then dove into an 8-year inquiry into the universal urge to connect through mark making. It started in 2009 with a series called Unintentional Drawings and progressed to the omnipresent graffiti on the walls of the Ground Zero Blues Club in Clarksdale Mississippi.

This urge to mark inspired him to travel to 3 continents and visit 27 ancient cave sites in Southern Europe, Indonesia and Africa to view, first hand, the first drawings, paintings, and etchings made by early homo sapiens from up to 40,000 BC. He was particularly drawn to what are referred to as "signs" or symbols which may be the earliest known marks of all. The experiences that he had within the caves has led his artistic career to investigate modern and ancient symbols as well as paint and draw images combined with the same type of flickering light- dots and hand stencils.

In 2017 he traveled to the Kalahari Desert of Namibia, where he met the Sans, the oldest indigenous group in the world. Months after returning from Africa, Kraft realized that the safari directly exposed him to the sacred animals which the Sans had worshipped. The most powerful to him was the elephant. He then proceeded to sculpt, in light, the spirit of the African elephant-half size- in a light blue-silvery neon. During this creative process, the spirit of the African elephant evolved into the Damaged spirit of the African elephant, visually illustrating the horrific poaching of elephants tusks occurring around the world.

=== Public art ===
When asked why he began to work in large-scale public art by Washington, D.C., local news reporter Holly Morris, Kraft responded that he wanted to be able to draw on buildings with neon, and that when drawing in space with light one needs to be able to work much larger. Many of his public art pieces appear to do just this. Lightweb, arguably Kraft's most famous work, installed on an external elevator in downtown Silver Spring, MD, features green, red, and blue colored tubes that extend from its architectural base into the air to create a 35' by 10' by 10' light drawing in the night sky. Lightweb was commissioned by the local Montgomery County Government in 2003. Vivace, another one of Kraft's renowned public works which was commissioned by the city of Washington, D.C., for the Watha T Daniel Library. This Sculpture is 21' x 14' x 7' and made of rolled painted aluminum, neon, and steel.

Kraft's combination of rolled aluminum tubing and neon functions well for an outdoor setting, for he is able to use the aluminum to protect the neon's wiring from the elements, whether these pieces are attached to buildings or are freestanding. Some critics have questioned whether neon, a material traditionally associated with nighttime viewing, functions well for public art viewed during the daytime. However other art critics believe that Kraft's most recent neon works, which incorporate aluminum tubes painted in a vibrant powder coating, appear just as bold during the daytime as during the night.

=== Selected works ===
- Seated/Unseated Woman (1989)
- Light Figure Fragment (1992)
- Falling Man (1995), New York, NY
- Lightweb (2004), Silver Spring, MD
- Untitled [Arlington Arts Center] (2005), Arlington, VA
- Crossroads (2006), Rockville, MD
- Lightwinds with Echo (2007), private collection Washington, D.C.
- Fire and Water (2007), Concord, NC
- Connective Ascension (2009), Loveland, CO
- Anacoeti (2009), Washington, D.C.
- Vivace (2010), Shaw Library, Washington, D.C.
- Damaged spirit of the African Elephant (2018) Anacostia, Washington, D.C.

== Awards and grants ==
- Public Art Building Communities (2009), Granted by the DC Commission on the Arts and Humanities for the Honfleur Gallery, Washington, D.C.
- Sculpture Now (2007), Show Award from Juror Ramon Osuna, Washington, D.C.
- Visual Arts Grant(1999), Granted by the DC Commission on the Arts and Humanities and the National Endowment for the Arts, Washington, D.C.
- Masterworks (1998), Award from Convergence Art Festival, Providence, RI
- Projects Grant for Visual Artists (1997), Granted by the DC Commission on the Arts and Humanities, Washington, D.C.
- Western Carolina University Sculpture Award (1995), Cullowhee, NC
- Visual Arts Grant(1994), Granted by the DC Commission on the Arts and Humanities and the National Endowment for the Arts, Washington, D.C.
- Visual Arts Grant(), Granted by the DC Commission on the Arts and Humanities and the National Endowment for the Arts, Washington, D.C.
