= West Indian cricket team in England in 1976 =

International cricket tour

	West Indies	England
- Dates: 12 May – 17 August
Captains	Clive Lloyd	Tony Greig; Alan Knott (1st ODI)

Test series
- Result: West Indies won the 5-match series 3–0
Most runs	Viv Richards (829); Gordon Greenidge (592); Roy Fredericks (517)	David Steele (308); Alan Knott (270); Bob Woolmer (245)
Most wickets	Michael Holding (28); Andy Roberts (28)	Derek Underwood (17); John Snow (15)
- Player of the series: Viv Richards (WI)

One Day International series
- Results: West Indies won the 3-match series 3–0
Most runs	Viv Richards (216); Gordon Greenidge (98)	Derek Randall (127); Dennis Amiss (93)
Most wickets	Andy Roberts (8)	Derek Underwood (5)
- Player of the series: Derek Randall (Eng) and Viv Richards (WI)

The West Indian cricket team toured England in 1976, spending virtually the whole of the 1976 English cricket season in England. West Indies also played one match in Ireland in July.

Having drawn the 1973-74 series in the West Indies, England started the series in confident mood, with their captain Tony Greig proclaiming before TV cameras that England would make West Indies "grovel".

Greig was never allowed to forget that comment, although in a subsequent interview many years later he recounted that his comment was born out of frustration with the journalist interviewing him at Hove in early season 1976. Greig felt that the interviewer was concentrating too much on the West Indies fast bowling attack and not discussing England's strengths. In an interview with Sky Sports "Saturday Story" around a year before he died, Greig apologised on camera for his remark — some 35 years after he had originally made it.

The international matches were dominated by the West Indies, captained by Clive Lloyd. England struggled against the batting of Gordon Greenidge and Viv Richards and the pace bowling of Michael Holding, Andy Roberts, Vanburn Holder and Wayne Daniel. Richards smashed 829 runs in four Tests, but missed the 2nd Test due to illness. Impressive individual performances for England included centuries for Tony Greig and Alan Knott in the 4th Test, a double century by Dennis Amiss in the 5th Test, and the bowling of John Snow, Bob Willis and Derek Underwood.

In the last test played at the Oval, Richards plundered 291 runs and his second double-ton of the series; this remained his highest test score. During the innings he surpassed Garfield Sobers' record of six test tons in a calendar year. He also scored 1,710 runs in a calendar year, which remained a world record until 2006.

The highlights of the tour were five Test matches and three One Day Internationals against the English cricket team. After the first two Tests were drawn, the West Indies easily won the remaining three Tests to take the five-match Test series 3–0 and retain the Wisden Trophy. West Indies also won all 3 of the ODIs.

West Indies also played numerous matches against the first-class counties and other minor teams.

== Touring Party ==
Name	Colony	Age	Position
Wayne Wendell Daniel	Barbados	20	Right Arm Fast
Thaddeus Michael Findlay	Windward Islands	32	Reserve Wicket Keeper
Roy Clifton Fredericks	Guyana	33	Left Handed Batsman (opener)
Hilary Angelo Gomes	Trinidad and Tobago	22	Left Handed Batsman
Cuthbert Gordon Greenidge	Barbados	25	Right Handed Batsman (opener)
Vanburn Alonzo Holder	Barbados	30	Right Arm Fast Medium
Michael Anthony Holding	Jamaica	22	Right Arm Fast
Bernard Denis Julien	Trinidad and Tobago	26	Left Arm Fast Medium
Raphick Rasif Jumadeen	Trinidad and Tobago	28	Slow Left Armer
Alvin Isaac Kallicharran	Guyana	27	Left Handed Batsman
Collis Llewellyn King	Barbados	24	Right Handed Batsman/Right Arm Fast Medium
Clive Hubert Lloyd	Guyana	31	Left Handed Batsman (captain)
Deryck Lance Murray	Trinidad and Tobago	33	Wicket Keeper (vice captain)
Albert Leroy Padmore	Barbados	29	Off Break
Isaac Vivian Alexander Richards	Leeward Islands	24	Right Handed Batsman
Anderson Montgomery Everton Roberts	Leeward Islands	25	Right Arm Fast
Lawrence George Rowe	Jamaica	27	Right Handed Batsman
Clyde Leopold Walcott	Barbados	50	Manager
Frank Gilbert Thomas	Barbados	52	Assistant manager
Malcolm Robinson	UK	27	Physiotherapist

== Form ==
=== West Indies ===
The West Indies arrived in England with a new approach to cricket, particularly bowling. During the 1975–1976 season, the West Indies team was thrashed 5–1 in Australia, unable to cope with the home side's fast arm bowlers like Jeff Thomson and Dennis Lillee. In response, captain Clive Lloyd completely transformed the West Indies team with a focus on fast bowling. The new West Indies style debuted that same winter in 1975 when the West Indies hosted India. The West Indies won the series 2–1. However, the victory was a result of India choosing to withdraw their final batsmen in response to what they described as barbaric, reckless, and dangerous West Indies' bowling.

=== England ===
The England cricket team had enjoyed a long spell of success in the early 1970s with consecutive victories in The Ashes and a strong record against other international opponents. However, defeats in 1975 to Australia in the Cricket World Cup and in The Ashes had exposed the team as possibly ageing and lacking top-class fast bowlers.

== Test series summary ==
=== First Test ===
3 – 8 June 1976
Scorecard

West Indies	v	England
494 (153.3 overs); IVA Richards 232 (313); DL Underwood 4/82 (27 overs)		332 (134.4 overs); DS Steele 106 (296); WW Daniel 4/53 (23 overs)
176/5d (36 overs); IVA Richards 63 (84); JA Snow 4/53 (11 overs)		156/2 (78 overs); JH Edrich 76* (255); VA Holder 1/12 (12 overs)

Match drawn
Trent Bridge, Nottingham
Umpires: HD Bird and TW Spencer

- West Indies won the toss and elected to bat.
- 6 June was taken as a rest day.
- JM Brearley (ENG) and HA Gomes (WIN) made their Test debuts.

After the traditional opening fixture against Lavinia, Duchess of Norfolk's XI, and warm-up matches against county sides, the 1st Test was played at Trent Bridge at the beginning of June.

England's Mike Brearley and West Indian Larry Gomes made their Test debuts. West Indies won the toss and batted through most of the first two days to score 494 all out. Viv Richards made the top score of 232, supported in a third wicket stand of 303 by Alvin Kallicharran, who made 97. However, having reached 408–2, the West Indies displayed some batting vulnerability, and the last 8 wickets fell for 86 runs, Derek Underwood taking 4-82.

England made a solid reply, scoring 332, including 106 for David Steele and 82 for Bob Woolmer, and Wayne Daniel taking 4-53. Richards hit a brisk 63 in the West Indies second innings of 176-5 declared. Facing a victory target of 339, England batted out the last day for a draw, with England opening batsman John Edrich undefeated on 76 at the close.

=== Second Test ===
17 – 22 June 1976
Scorecard

England	v	West Indies
250 (95.4 overs); DB Close 60 (146); AME Roberts 5/60 (23 overs)		182 (50.4 overs); CG Greenidge 84 (119); DL Underwood 5/39 (18.4 overs)
254 (104.5 overs); DS Steele 64 (206); AME Roberts 5/63 (29.5 overs)		241/6 (86.3 overs); RC Fredericks 138 (253); AW Greig 2/42 (14 overs)

Match drawn
Lord's, London
Umpires: HD Bird and DJ Constant

- England won the toss and elected to bat.
- 20 June was taken as a rest day.
- There was no play on the third day.

The 2nd Test was played at Lord's two weeks later. Richards was unfit, and was replaced by bowler Raphick Jumadeen; Michael Holding played in place of Daniel. England also made two changes, with Barry Wood for Edrich and Pat Pocock for Mike Hendrick.

England won the toss and batted, scoring 250, with Roberts taking 5-60. West Indies opening batsman Gordon Greenidge scored 84 and captain Clive Lloyd 50, but Underwood took 5-39 and John Snow 4-68, to bowl West Indies out in 50.4 overs for only 182 on the second day. The third day was washed out, but England batted through the fourth day and were finally bowled out for 254 at the start of the fifth day, with Roberts taking his second 5-wicket haul in the match (5-63). Needing 323 to win, West Indies reached 241-6 by the close, with 138 to Roy Fredericks, and the match was drawn.

=== Third Test ===
8 – 13 July 1976
Scorecard

West Indies	v	England
211 (70 overs); CG Greenidge 134 (198); MWW Selvey 4/41 (17 overs)		71 (32.5 overs); DS Steele 20 (23); MA Holding 5/17 (14.5 overs)
411/5d (114 overs); IVA Richards 135 (261); PI Pocock 2/98 (27 overs)		126 (63.5 overs); Extras 25; JH Edrich 24 (100); AME Roberts 6/37 (20.5 overs)

West Indies won by 425 runs
Old Trafford, Manchester
Umpires: WE Alley and WL Budd

- West Indies won the toss and elected to bat.
- 11 July was taken as a rest day.
- MWW Selvey (ENG) and CL King (WIN) made their Test debuts.

After a gap of three weeks, the 3rd Test was played at Old Trafford in the second week of July. With the series still at 0–0 with three to play, West Indies won the toss and again chose to bat.

Three early wickets for debutant Mike Selvey and one for the returned Mike Hendrick saw the West Indies on the back foot at 26–4, but Greenidge (134) and debutant Collis King (32) recovered the position to a relatively respectable 211 all out. The West Indian first innings was put into perspective as Holding (5-17), Roberts (3-22), and Daniel (2-13) ripped through the England batting, dismissing them for 71 in 32.5 overs. Steele (20) was the only England batsman to reach double figures, and the only one to beat the extras.

West Indies dominated from the start of their second innings, with century stands for the first three wickets, between Fredericks (50) and Greenidge (101), Greenidge and Richards (135), Richards and Lloyd (43). West Indies declared on 411-5 near the end of the third day, leaving England to score 552 to win, or, more likely, to bat out two days to secure a draw. England survived for 63.5 overs. Rain interrupted play on the fourth day, but England were all out for 126 twenty balls into the last day. Edrich top scored on 24, but was unable to beat extras (25). West Indies won by 425 runs.

=== Fourth Test ===
22 – 27 July 1976
Scorecard

West Indies	v	England
450 (88.4 overs); CG Greenidge 115 (147); JA Snow 4/77 (18.4 overs)		387 (133.3 overs); AW Greig 116 (264); APE Knott 116 (212); VA Holder 3/73 (30.3 overs)
196 (51.3 overs); CL King 58 (58); RGD Willis 5/42 (15.3 overs)		204 (56 overs); AW Greig 76* (102); AME Roberts 3/41 (18 overs)

West Indies won by 55 runs
Headingley, Leeds
Umpires: DJ Constant and TW Spencer

- West Indies won the toss and elected to bat.
- 25 July was taken as a rest day.
- JC Balderstone and P Willey (both ENG) made their Test debuts.

Now 1-0 down, England needed to win the 4th Test, which began at Headingley two weeks later, to recover the Wisden Trophy. England's Chris Balderstone and Peter Willey both made their Test debuts.

Batting first, Greenidge (115) and Fredericks (109) both hit quick centuries in an opening stand of 192. Richards (66) and Lawrence Rowe (50) both added half-centuries, and West Indies were bowled out for 450 early on the second day, Snow taking 4-77 and Bob Willis 3-71. England were soon in trouble at 80–4, but captain Tony Greig and wicket-keeper Alan Knott added 152 for the sixth wicket, each making 116 in a sixth-wicket stand of 152. England were bowled out for 387, only 63 behind. West Indies lost quick wickets, and Willis took 5–42 to wrap up the tail. West Indies were bowled out for 196 in 51.3 overs. Set a target of 260 to win, Roberts (3-41), Holding (3-44) and Daniel (3-60) bowled England out for 204 in 56 overs. Greig was unbeaten on 76, to add to his first-innings century, but West Indies won by 55 runs.

=== Fifth Test ===
12 – 17 August 1976
Scorecard

West Indies	v	England
687/8d (182.5 overs); IVA Richards 291 (386); DL Underwood 3/165 (60.5 overs)		435 (129.5 overs); DL Amiss 203 (320); MA Holding 8/92 (33 overs)
182/0d (32 overs); RC Fredericks 86* (101)		203 (78.4 overs); APE Knott 57 (172); MA Holding 6/57 (20.4 overs)

West Indies won by 231 runs
The Oval, London
Umpires: WE Alley and HD Bird

- West Indies won the toss and elected to bat.
- 15 August was taken as a rest day.
- G Miller (ENG) made his Test debut.
- Viv Richards passed 2,000 test runs

England had lost the series, but could recover some pride by winning the 5th Test played on a very dry pitch at the Oval in mid-August.

West Indies batted for most of the first two days to score a monumental 687–8. Richards reached 291, his second double century of the series. Nine of England's 11 players were given a bowl, save only the recalled Dennis Amiss and wicket-keeper Knott. The opening fast bowlers, Willis and Selvey, were quickly consigned to the outfield, bowling only 15 overs each; Underwood bowled 60.5 overs, with 27 from debutant spinner Geoff Miller and another 34 and 17 overs added by the occasional spin bowling of captain Greig and Chris Balderstone respectively. England replied with a creditable 435, including 203 for Amiss and 50 for Knott. Holding dominated the bowling, taking 8-92, all but one of them bowled or lbw. Despite taking a first-innings lead of 252, West Indies declined to enforce the follow-on. Instead, Greenidge (86*) and Fredericks (85*) scored quick runs, adding 182 in a 32-over unbroken opening partnership, and West Indies declared on 182 for no wicket late on the fourth day, leaving England a target of 435 for victory. Holding took 6-57, giving him a match total of 14–149, as England were bowled out for 203. Knott top scorer on 57, his second half-century of the match. West Indies won the match by 231 runs, and the Test series 3–0.

== One Day Internationals (ODIs) ==
The West Indies won the Prudential Trophy 3–0.

=== 1st ODI ===
26 August 1976
Scorecard

England; 202/8 (55 overs)	v	West Indies; 207/4 (41 overs)
GD Barlow 80* (139); AME Roberts 4/32 (11 overs)		IVA Richards 119* (133); IT Botham 1/26 (3 overs)

West Indies won by 6 wickets
North Marine Road, Scarborough
Umpires: DJ Constant and A Jepson
Player of the match: IVA Richards (WIN)

- West Indies won the toss and elected to field.
- GD Barlow, IT Botham, GA Gooch, JK Lever and DS Steele (all ENG), and MA Holding and CL King (both WIN) made their ODI debuts.

In the 1st ODI, West Indies won the toss and put England in to bat, with ODi debuts for England's Graham Barlow, Ian Botham, Graham Gooch, John Lever and David Steele, and West Indies' Michael Holding and Collis King. Hostile bowling by Roberts (4-32) and Holding (2-38) restricted England to 202–8, Barlow top scoring on 80 not out. England were unable to stop Richards in the West Indian reply. He scored an unbeaten 119 off 133 balls to win the match with 14 overs to spare, and became man of the match.

=== 2nd ODI ===
28, 29 August 1976
Scorecard

West Indies; 221 (47.5 overs)	v	England; 185 (45.3 overs)
IVA Richards 97 (96); DL Underwood 3/27 (10 overs)		DW Randall 88 (133); AME Roberts 4/27 (8 overs)

West Indies won by 36 runs
Lord's, London
Umpires: WE Alley and AE Fagg
Player of the match: IVA Richards (WIN)

- England won the toss and elected to field.
- Reserve day used. England were 47/4 (10 overs) at the close of the first day.
- The match was reduced before play started from 55 overs to 50 overs per side.
- DW Randall (ENG) made his ODI debut.

England put West Indies in at the 2nd ODI, reduced to 50 overs due to rain. Richards again scored heavily, with 97 off 96 balls, but West Indies were unable to bat out their overs, scoring 221 all out off 47.5 overs, with the spinners taking most of the wickets. Despite 88 from ODI debutant Derek Randall, the West Indian bowling, particularly Roberts (4-27), again dominated. Further weather interruptions pushed the match into the reserve day, when West Indies won by 36 runs. Richards was again man of the match.

=== 3rd ODI ===
30, 31 August 1976
Scorecard

West Indies; 223/9 (32 overs)	v	England; 173 (31.4 overs)
CH Lloyd 79 (59); M Hendrick 2/45 (10 overs)		DL Amiss 47 (54); VA Holder 5/50 (10 overs)

West Indies won by 50 runs
Edgbaston, Birmingham
Umpires: HD Bird and WL Budd
Player of the match: CH Lloyd (WIN)

- England won the toss and elected to field.
- Reserve day used. No play first day.
- The match was reduced before play started from 55 overs to 32 overs per side.

Play was impossible on 30 August, but the match began on the reserve day, limited this time to only 32 overs. England again put West Indies in to bat, and Fredericks and Richards were quickly out, Richards for a duck. However, runs from Greenidge (42), Lloyd (79) and Rowe (45) saw West Indies to 223 for 9. After a good start, with an opening partnership of 54 between Wood and Amiss, England were bowled out for 173 in 31.4 overs, with Vanburn Holder taking 5-50, and West Indies won by 50 runs. Lloyd was man of the match.

== Controversy ==
On 2 June 1976, the eve of the first test match of the series, England captain Tony Greig was interviewed on BBC’s midweek sports program Sportsnight. The interview was conducted on the roof of Hove’s Pavilion in Sussex. In the interview, Greig was forced to respond to questions concerning England’s chances of winning the series against the young West Indies' side. Greig described being unimpressed by the West Indian squad. He described the West Indies recent humiliating defeat in Australia and their tumultuous home series against India. Greig explained, "I like to think that people are building these West Indians up, because I am not really sure they’re as good as everyone thinks they are.” He then notoriously claimed, “Sure, they’ve got a couple of fast bowlers, but… you must remember that (if) the West Indian get on top they are magnificent cricketers, but if they’re down, they grovel. And I intend, with the help of Closey and a few others, to make them grovel.” The insensitive comments only inflamed the racial and colonial implications surrounding the 1976 series. The remark was particularly provocative coming from Greig, the white South African-born captain of England.

West Indian bowler, Michael Holding recalled how the comment “Smacked of racism and Apartheid. He got our backs up and made us more determined.” Greig claimed the word grovel was used only as a response to the way the interviewer had been discrediting the England team as major underdogs in the match-up. When asked about the remark prior to the first test, the West Indian captain Clive Lloyd gave Greig the benefit of the doubt surrounding the use of the word grovel. Lloyd however declared being furious about how Greig had patronizingly characterized the West Indies team as unprofessional and nonchalant Calypso cricketers.

During the final match at The Oval as defeat became imminent for the English side, Greig kneeled down on to the pitch smiling and performed a ‘grovel’ crawl on the ground. The act of contrition was received with applause from a large portion of the West Indians fans present that had been previously taunting the England captain. The West Indies batsman Viv Richards remarked “In other words, he was going to have us down on our knees, begging for mercy! This was the greatest motivating speech the England captain could have given to any West Indian team.”

== Legacy ==
The West Indies victory in the 1976 series was the first of seven consecutive wins over England. The 1976 series also helped salvage the then financially struggling Test and County Cricket Board (TCCB). The series generated £950,000 for the TCCB, forty percent more than The Ashes of 1975 had produced in revenue. For the next two decades, the West Indies cricket would dominate international cricket, after 1979 not losing a series for fifteen years. The 1976 series has been characterized as a turning point for the West Indies cricket team. The series revealed to the cricketing world a new generation of West Indian cricket superstars like Viv Richards, Clive Lloyd, and Michael Holding. The victory exposed the West Indies team as a group of world-class cricketers who had developed into a major threat in international cricket.

=== Book ===
The 1976 series has been memorialized by David Tossel's “Grovel: The story and legacy of the summer of 1976.” Published in 2007, the book provides an in depth depiction of the series and its significance to West Indies' cricket and to the sport of cricket in general. The book also features a collection of action photos of the match proceedings.

=== Film ===
The 1976 test series between the West Indies and England also features in Stevan Riley’s 2010 British documentary Fire in Babylon. A whole chapter of the film is devoted to the 1976 series. The documentary highlights the significance of the summer of 1976 in England, and its impact on West Indies cricket and the West Indian community in England in the 1970s.
