= Gerard Leone =

American lawyer

Gerry Leone

Massachusetts District Attorney for the Northern District
- In office 2007–2013
- Preceded by: Martha Coakley
- Succeeded by: Marian T. Ryan

Personal details
- Party: Democratic Party
- Occupation: Lawyer

Gerard T. “Gerry” Leone Jr. served as the District Attorney of Middlesex County, Massachusetts from 2007 to 2013. He was formerly a partner at the law firm Nixon Peabody. He was then the General Counsel for the Office of the President at UMass. He currently leads the Higher Education legal practice as Special Counsel at Hunton Andrews Kurth, LLP.

== Early life and education ==
Leone was born in Franklin, Massachusetts and attended Harvard University, where he was a member of the Harvard Crimson football team from 1982–85, and the Harvard Boxing Club. He attended Suffolk University Law School at night, graduating in 1989.

== Legal career ==
Leone's first legal job was as an assistant district attorney in the Middlesex County District Attorney's office. He worked there for a little over a decade before taking a job as an Assistant United States Attorney in the District of Massachusetts. His most notable case was the prosecution of Richard Reid, better known as the "Shoe Bomber".

He was named the FBI Director's Award and the Executive Office for the United States Attorneys’ Director’s Award. He served in the office from 2001 to 2005 and was eventually promoted to be the First Assistant United States Attorney.

In 2006, Leone resigned from his federal prosecutor position in order to serve as the Middlesex County District Attorney. He was reelected for a second term in 2010.

In April 2013, Leone resigned as Middlesex County District Attorney in order to become a partner at Nixon Peabody (focusing on governmental investigations and white collar criminal defense).

== Prosecution of Aisling Brady McCarthy ==
Leone was the District Attorney who in April 2013 initially charged Irish nanny Aisling Brady McCarthy with first-degree murder in the death of a one-year-old girl, Rehma Sabir. Brady McCarthy spent 27 months in a United States prison, and a further 3 months in House Arrest. On 1 September 2015 all charges against Brady McCarthy were dropped after Leone's successor as DA for Middlesex, Massachusetts Marian Ryan said: "Based on an assessment of the present state of the evidence, including the amended ruling from the medical examiner who performed the autopsy, the Commonwealth cannot meet its burden of proof."

Legal offices
Preceded by Martha Coakley	Middlesex County District Attorney; 2007-2013	Succeeded by Marian T. Ryan
