= Listen to Me Marlon =

2015 documentary film

- U.S. theatrical release poster
- Directed by: Stevan Riley
- Written by: Stevan Riley; Peter Ettedgui
- Produced by: John Battsek; R. J. Cutler; George Chignell
- Edited by: Stevan Riley
- Music by: Stefan Wesołowski
- Production companies: Passion Pictures; Cutler Productions
- Distributed by: Showtime Films
- Release date: 24 January 2015 (Sundance Film Festival)
- Running time: 95 minutes
- Country: United Kingdom
- Language: English
- Box office: US$516,337

Listen to Me Marlon is a 2015 British documentary film written, directed and edited by Stevan Riley about the movie star and iconic actor Marlon Brando.

== Release ==
On 29 July 2015 Listen to Me Marlon was released theatrically in the United States; screening in over 140 cities during a ten-week run. The film was nominated for a Gotham Award.

== Reception ==
=== Box office ===
Listen to Me Marlon grossed £47,869 (US$70,558) in the United Kingdom and $445,779 in other territories, for a total worldwide gross of $516,337.

=== Critical response ===
Upon its premiere in 2015, the film received positive reviews from critics. On review aggregator Rotten Tomatoes, the film holds an approval rating of 96% based on 102 reviews, with an average rating of 8.0/10. The site's critical consensus reads: "Listen to Me Marlon offers a fascinating look at the inner life of a Hollywood icon, told in his own words."

The Village Voice called it "a masterpiece" and David Edelstein lists it as "the greatest, most searching documentary of an actor ever put on film." According to Vanity Fair, it "is a compelling documentary about Marlon Brando compiled entirely from private audio tapes the actor recorded at home, in business meetings, during hypnosis, in therapy, and during press interviews."

Variety writes Brando's "complexity is limned as well as a documentary possibly could manage... Made with the full cooperation of the Brando estate, the pic is a superbly crafted collage whose soundtrack is as complexly textured as the curation and editing of visual elements." As Rolling Stone summed it up: "You want Brando Confidential? Fine, you've got it."

== Accolades ==
- Winner – Best Documentary at The 2015 San Francisco Film Critics Circle Awards
- Winner – IDA Creative Recognition Award for Best Writing
- Winner – 2015 Peabody Award
- Winner – Best Film Founders Prize at the Traverse City Film Festival 2015
- Nominated – Best Documentary BAFTA
- Nominated – Best Documentary by The Phoenix Critics’ Circle
- Nominated – Best Feature IDA Award
- Nominated – Best Documentary at the 25th Gotham Independent Film Awards
- Nominated – World Cinema Documentary at the Sundance Film Festival 2015
- Nominated – Documentary Feature at the Montclair Film Festival 2015
- Nominated – Best Documentary at the 2015 Detroit Film Critics Society Awards
- Included in The National Board of Review’s Top 5 Documentaries of 2015
- Shortlisted as one of the 15 Documentary films being considered for an Academy Award
