= Cambridge University Amateur Boxing Club =

Boxing club in Cambridge, England

== About ==
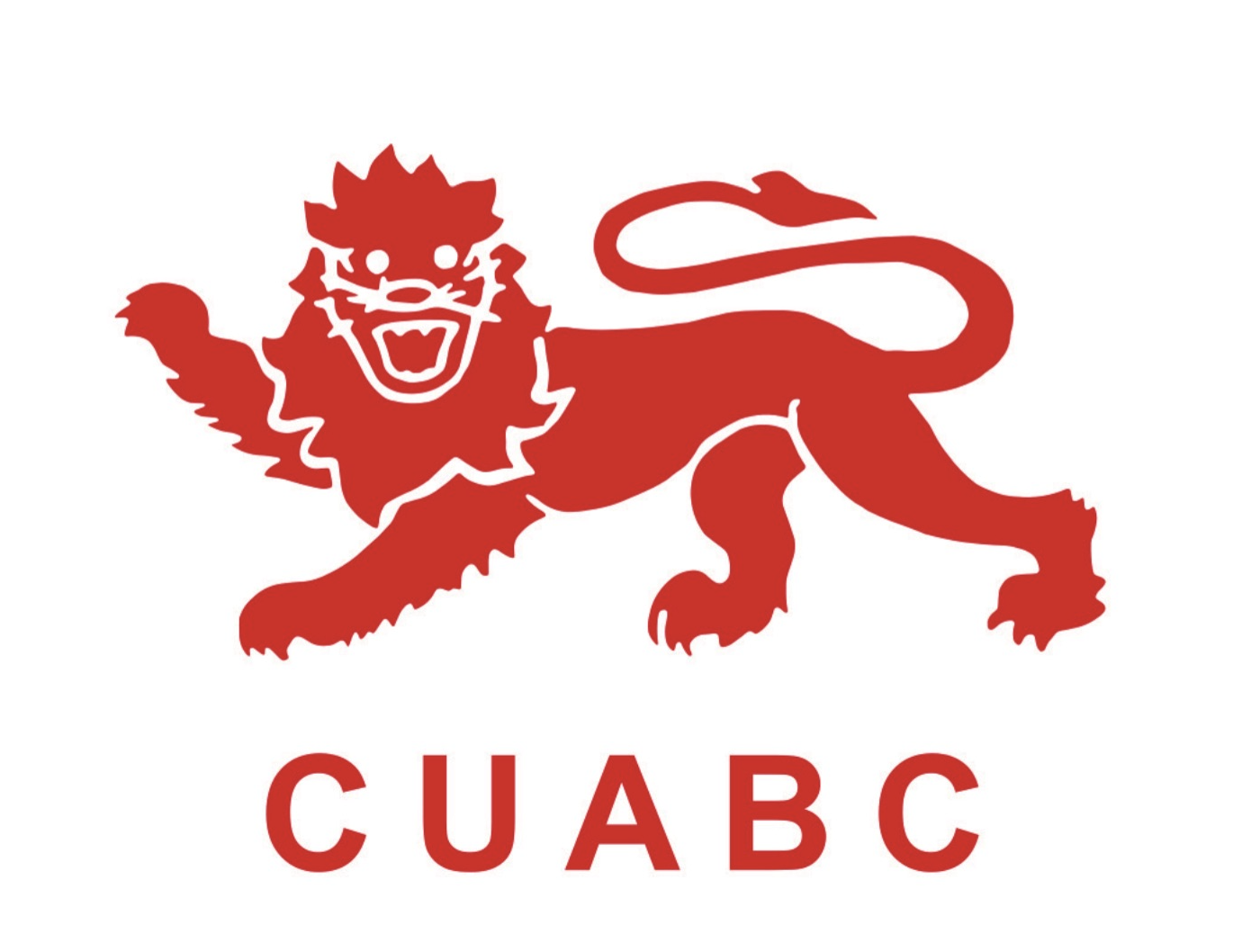
Logo of the Cambridge University Amateur Boxing Club

Cambridge University Amateur Boxing Club (CUABC) is the boxing club of the University of Cambridge, England. Established in 1896, it is one of the toughest and most prestigious sports teams in Cambridge. Each season, around 250 men and women compete for one of the coveted 12 places on the Varsity Team. The annual Varsity Match against Oxford is the longest-running inter-club amateur boxing fixture in the world.

The foundations of the modern rules of boxing were created at the University of Cambridge, and it is one of the original nine Full Blue Sports at Cambridge. The club was founded after the King's College Boxing Club amalgamated with Fordham's School of Arms to form the Cambridge University Boxing & Fencing Club (CUB&FC).

Cambridge University Amateur Boxing Club (CUABC) is based at the University Sports Centre in West Cambridge, equipped with a modern boxing gym with bags, a ring and a large floor area. The Blues Squad train six days a week, with the opportunity to compete in BUCS, Town vs. Gown and the annual Varsity match against Oxford.

== Varsity ==
The club has competed against Oxford University Amateur Boxing Club in the Varsity Match each year since 1897 to win the Truelove Bowl. Typically, the match location switches between Oxford and Cambridge, though recently Cambridge have hosted matches in London. Boxers who compete in the Varsity Match are traditionally awarded a Full Blue by the Cambridge University Men's Blues Committee if they win individually or the team wins. Other boxers, such as those having been selected for a second Varsity Match, can be awarded a Blue at the discretion of the committee.

In the 2005 Varsity Match, Kaleen Love of Oxford defeated Catherine Tubb of Cambridge in the first women's varsity boxing bout. Catherine Tubb had previously beaten Kaleen at the BUSA championships held in December 2004. Both were awarded Extraordinary Full Blues for their athletic accomplishments. In recent years, two more Extraordinary Full Blues have been awarded to Sarah Burden and Heley Matthews. Chris Webb remains the only boxer in history to have represented Cambridge in the Varsity match 4 times, and won all 4 bouts.

In both the 2005 and 2009 Varsity Matches, CUABC beat OUABC by the maximum 9-0 margin. Cambridge University Amateur Boxing Club (CUABC) remains the only side to have achieved this feat since the number of bouts was increased to 9 in the 1950s.

On 1 March 2015 CUABC broke OUABC's five year winning streak in the Varsity Match, winning 6-3.

Oxford University Amateur Boxing Club (OUABC) has withdrawn its women’s team from the 2020 Cambridge Oxford Varsity boxing bout over concerns around suitably matching experience levels between fighters and the potential impact of this on the safety of athletes.

Cambridge have won 56 matches of the 114 Varsity boxing matches; Oxford 54.

In 2025, club president Spencer Lee Boya oversaw the inclusion of women's bouts in the final varsity scorecard in an effort to ensure that female members of the club had equal opportunities to men, thus ensuring one Varsity Match for all student boxers.

== Town vs. Gown ==
The Town vs. Gown is an annual boxing show that has been running for thirty years in Cambridge. It is one of the fiercest sporting spectacles and Cambridge University Amateur Boxing Club (CUABC) are usually matched against boxers from in and around Cambridge.

University boxers have been known to rough themselves up ahead of their Varsity Match preparations later on in Lent term, by offering an opportunity to many novice boxers to experience their first bout in front of a crowd and familiar setting, all in preparation for the upcoming Varsity clashes.

In 2025, the Town vs. Gown show was noted as an "eye-opening exhibition" of a "rejuvenated-era for CUABC", where participant numbers skyrocketed and injury levels reduced due to new safety measures and training plans.

== See also ==
- Oxford–Cambridge rivalry
- Varsity match
