= Fire in Babylon =

- Directed by: Stevan Riley
- Starring: Viv Richards, Michael Holding, Deryck Murray, Clive Lloyd, Andy Roberts, Colin Croft, Gordon Greenidge, Joel Garner
- Production company: Cowboy Films/Passion Pictures
- Distributed by: New Vdeo Group
- Release dates: 18 October 2010 (London); 20 May 2011 (United Kingdom)
- Running time: 80 minutes
- Country: United Kingdom
- Language: English

Fire in Babylon is a 2010 British documentary film about the record-breaking West Indies cricket team of the 1970s and 1980s. Featuring stock footage and interviews with several former players and officials, including Colin Croft, Deryck Murray, Joel Garner, Gordon Greenidge, Desmond Haynes, Michael Holding, Clive Lloyd, Viv Richards and Andy Roberts, the film was written and directed by Stevan Riley and was nominated for a British Independent Film Award for Best Documentary. It was the joint-winner (with Reggae Britannia) of the UNESCO Award at the Jamaica Reggae Film Festival 2011.

== Synopsis ==
The documentary describes the ascension of West Indies cricket from being a team largely composed of highly talented, entertaining, "Calypso Cricketers" to a determined unit that dominated world cricket for almost twenty years.

It begins with an introduction to the West Indies Cricket Team, using interviews with West Indian cricketing greats, and other people closely associated with West Indies cricket. The idea of culturally and politically different Caribbean nations playing under the common banner of the West Indies is described.

The history of cricket in the West Indies is briefly described, such as the appointment of Sir Frank Worrell as the first black man to captain the West Indies Cricket Team, and the emergence of such cricketing greats as Everton Weekes, Learie Constantine, and Sir Garfield Sobers is represented. However talented these individual cricketers were, they were unable to fetch results, resulting in the West Indies being perceived as "Calypso Cricketers", that is, people who were entertaining to watch, but would eventually lose.

This documentary depicts the emergence of a new crop of West Indian cricketers in the 1970s that was eager to shake the tag of Calypso and who could compete on the world stage. Clive Lloyd, appointed as Captain in 1974, is portrayed as a guiding hand, who could steer a young team in the right direction, uniting them for a common cause on the cricket field. With Lloyd as Captain, the team's first major challenge came in the 1975-76 West Indies Tour of Australia. Australians Dennis Lillee and Jeff Thomson destroyed the West Indies with their fast bowling. Frequent bouncers and intimidatory tactics led to the spirit of the team being shattered and the tour ended with Australia winning the six-match test series 5–1. At the end of the series, Clive Lloyd realizes that in order to win, it would be necessary for him to also cultivate fast bowlers as devastating as Lillee and Thomson.

When the Indian Cricket Team toured the West Indies in 1976, Clive Lloyd tested his new plan of attack, relentlessly getting his fast bowlers such as Andy Roberts, Michael Holding, and Wayne Daniel to bowl short-pitched or bouncers to Indian batsman. While playing at Kingston, Jamaica the Indian team declared on a second-innings lead of 12, after the management decided that they would rather not risk sending their bowlers such as Bishen Singh Bedi to face the fearsome fast bowling.

Convinced of the effectiveness of pace bowling as an instrument to success, Clive Lloyd's team departed to their Tour of England in 1976. England Captain Tony Greig's infamous "grovel" comment is shown in its entirety, and the effect it had on galvanising the team is described. After some highly aggressive fast bowling against the English batsmen, West Indian fast bowling is seen as being dangerous to the game. However, the West Indians feel that if the Australians could do it, so could they. Viv Richards is shown as dominating the Test series as a batsman, where he scored 829 runs in four tests with two double-centuries. Viv Richards' refusal to be intimidated by fast bowling is also seen as the ideal way for a batsman to deal with West Indian bowling.

The documentary then describes the struggle with their board for better pay, and how Kerry Packer eventually enticed the team to participate in World Series Cricket in 1977. World Series Cricket turns out to be a fore-runner of changes in cricket that only became permanent in the 1990s; such as coloured kits, day/night matches, and a greater emphasis on professionalism in play. The West Indian team emerges from the tournament fitter, stronger, and with a more professional outlook to the game.

The 1982 Rebel Tour to Apartheid-ruled South Africa is described. Colin Croft chooses to go, earning him a life ban from the West Indies Cricket Board. The main target of the regime, however, is international superstar Viv Richards. Richards states that he was offered "a blank cheque", but decided to not go as it would validate the state-sponsored racism pursued by the South African Government at the time, as well as cause a large number of first-choice West Indian cricketers to follow him on the tour.

It ends with a description of the West Indies' tour to England in 1984. With the emergence of fast bowling greats such as Joel Garner and Malcolm Marshall to take the place of Croft, the West Indies becomes unstoppable. After Gordon Greenidge's innings of 214 not out at Lord's, the West Indians become an unstoppable force; defeating England 5–0 in the five-test series. In a turn on the regular term "Whitewash" to describe such a win, the series was instead dubbed Blackwash.

The documentary ends with a description of how the West Indians earned the respect, admiration, and love of cricket fans and even opposing teams from across the world. As the end credits roll, Michael Holding describes how between February, 1980 to March, 1995; the West Indies Cricket Team did not lose a single Test series. (it was preceded by the controversial West Indies tour of New Zealand in 1979–80)

== Film festivals ==
Awards and nominations received by Fire in Babylon
Award	Year (Note: Indicates the year of ceremony.)	Category	Result	Ref.
British Independent Film Awards	2010	Best British Documentary	Nominated	
Broadcasting Press Guild Awards	2013	Best Single Documentary	Nominated	
Evening Standard British Film Awards	2011	Best Documentary	Nominated	
Tribeca Film Festival	2011	Best Documentary Feature	Nominated	

== See also ==
- Wisden Trophy
- Cricket in the West Indies
- History of cricket in the West Indies from 1970–71 to 1980
- History of cricket in the West Indies from 1980–81 to 1990
- West Indian cricket team in Australia in 1975–76
- Indian cricket team in the West Indies in 1976
- West Indian cricket team in England in 1976
- West Indian cricket team in England in 1984
