= Shaw Library =

Shaw Neighborhood/Watha T. Daniel Library
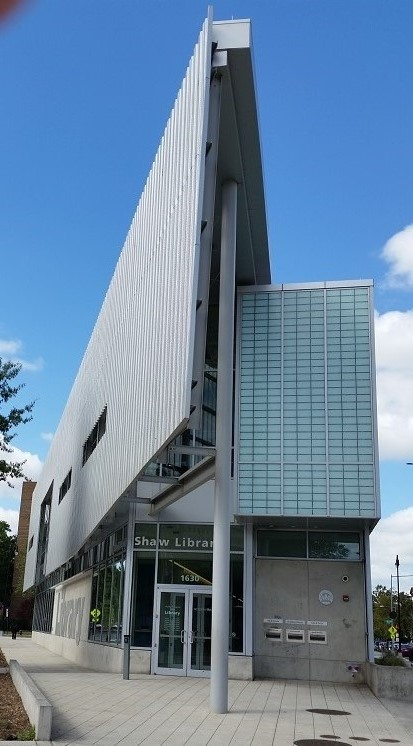
- East entrance to the Shaw Library, October 2015
- Interactive map of the Shaw Neighborhood/Watha T. Daniel Library area

General information
- Status: Completed
- Type: Public Library
- Location: 1630 7th St. NW, Washington D.C.
- Coordinates: 38°54′44″N 77°01′21″W
- Completed: 2010; 16 years ago
- Opening: August 2010
- Cost: $12 million
- Owner: DC Public Library
- Operator: DC Public Library

Technical details
- Floor count: 3
- Floor area: 22,800 sq ft (2,100 m^{2})

Design and construction
- Architect: Davis Brody Bond Aedas
- Developer: DC Public Library
- Structural engineer: Delon Hampton
- Main contractor: Forrester Construction Company

Interior of the library

The Shaw Neighborhood Library or Watha T. Daniel Library is a library in the District of Columbia Public Library's system. Originally constructed in 1975 as a two-story structure in the Shaw neighborhood, the building was extensively renovated and reopened as a three-story structure in August 2010. With its distinctive translucent facade, glass enclosure, and light flooded interior, it has been hailed as a model for future libraries.

== History ==
The Shaw library opened on September 27, 1975 at the intersection of Rhode Island Avenue and 7th Street NW with a ceremony led by Mayor Walter Washington. It reflected a design for the library, drawn up after the 1968 riots that devastated Shaw, which was so prison-like that the National Capital Planning Commission directed the District to open it up with larger windows, bigger setbacks, and arcades. The artictect, Eason Cross of the Alexandria VA-based firm Cross and Adreon, rejected the advice and persisted with the original Brutalist design that had only slits for windows. He continued with his plans, despite an attempt to get a federal injunction to stop, with the justification that the small, irregular size of the lot prohibited any redesign.

The original library, constructed at a cost of $1.2 million, came from Federal appropriations budgeted by the D.C. Commissioners. The two story building contained adult reading room, a lounge area, and a listening booth on the first floor while the second floor provided space for a children's room complete with a specially designed enclosure for story hours. The original building was razed in 2004.

The massive renovation, started with plans received in 2007, was part of a wave of upgrades to DC Public Library facilities undertaken by Chief Librarian Ginnie Cooper. Costs were estimated to be $15,707,441 or $433 per square foot, though final costs were reported at $12 million. Of any of the projects, the renovation of the Shaw Library showed the greatest transformation from its previous state, according to Cooper.

The building was named after Watha T. Daniel, a master plumber, Shaw resident and community leader who was the first chairman of the DC Model Cities Commission and died in 1971.

In March 2016, a security guard at the library was observed by multiple patrons harassing a Muslim patron for wearing a hijab. Protests were held outside the library and the security guard admitted to harassing the woman although he claimed he thought she was wearing a hoodie. The security guard, who had been previously terminated by Metropolitan Police for destruction of private property, was not fired despite there being no policy against wearing hoodies in the library.

== Design ==
The 22,800 sq ft (2,100 m^{2}) library fills a triangular 9,850 sq ft (900 m^{2}) site and has three stories — one below grade and two above. The entry plaza on the east end of the cite opens to the main lobby that provides access to the lower level which houses community spaces. Peter D. Cook, principal in charge of design at the Davis Brody Bond Aedas architectural firm responsible for the project, explained that “The Library will anchor the neighborhood by providing a civic facility rich in aesthetic, environmental and programmatic assets that is representative of DC Public Library’s commitment to a standard of excellence for all residents.”

The defining features of the building is a corrugated, perforated aluminum screen wall system across its southern façade which forms a distinctive jutting prow. With a 40% open area, the screen wall sits three feet in front of an expansive glazed curtain wall and provides shading of the upper level reading room while allowing natural daylight to enter the space. The shading system allows a reduced dependence on artificial lighting and protects the Library’s collection from harmful solar exposure. To take full advantage of the location's potential for unobstructed natural light, clerestory windows and translucent, insulated fiberglass panels on the north provide illumination from the sun on all sides. Lighting design firm MCLA validated light levels in the large, open room through a detailed analysis. The lighting designers developed an electric lighting system based primarily on the T5 linear fluorescent with a 3500-Kelvin color temperature—the lamp preferred by the client for energy and maintenance efficiency. Special fixtures are cantilevered from the tall stacks for vertical illumination on the books, and suspended luminaires are mounted over reading tables and workstations.

The renovated building was designed to meet LEED Silver Certification and incorporates a vegetative green roof, displacement air system, solar control and daylight management and uses of recyclable and renewable materials. It received LEED Gold Certification.

The design for the new library went through several iterations. At one point, amidst budget constraints, a model was proposed that scrapped much of the glass and proposed a structure similar to the old version. This was driven by the discovery that Metro has both a tunnel and a large vent under and abutting the library site, making it more expensive to do construction there.

== Resources ==
In addition to functioning as a library, the building has been hailed as a "hybrid community, recreation and learning center."

The library contains 40,000 books, DVDs, CDs and other library materials with capacity for 80,000 items. Computer access includes 32 public access computers, free Wi-Fi Internet access, and 8 Mac computers in the teen space. There is comfortable seating for 200 customers, one large program room for up to 100 people, two 12-person conference rooms, and a vending area. Among its community offerings are yoga and Bollywood dance classes. The facilities have been used for mayoral announcements.

== Other features ==
The entry plaza at the east end of the site welcomes the public to the library and displays a 22-foot neon sculpture by local artist Craig Kraft. Entitled Vivace, according to the artist the piece was inspired by jazz and is intended to capture "the spirit of creativity, vibrancy and color" that he associates with the Shaw neighborhood.

A graphic mural in the upper level displays a collage of portraits depicting over 250 members of the community and an inspirational quote from President Barack Obama’s inaugural address which reads, “We know that our patchwork heritage is a strength, not a weakness. We are shaped by every language and culture, drawn from every end of this Earth; and because we have tasted the bitter swill of civil war and segregation, and emerged from that dark chapter stronger and more united, we cannot help but believe that the old hatreds shall someday pass; that the lines of tribe shall soon dissolve; that as the world grows smaller, our common humanity shall reveal itself; and that America must play its role in ushering in a new era of peace.”

== Response ==
The District of Columbia’s Mayor Adrian M. Fenty presented the architects with a National Association of Builders and Contractors Proclamation Award. The Urban Land Institute named the library one of the Top 10 Buildings in Washington DC and it received the Developers and Builders Alliance Community Advancement Award for the Best Developments of the Year, USA & Canada. The Wall Street Journal named it one of the top 10 buildings in the US for 2010. Other awards include the Associated General Contractors Washington Contractor Award, NAIOP Award of Excellence and ENR Mid-Atlantic Construction Award.
