= Aisling Brady McCarthy =

Aisling Brady McCarthy is an Irishwoman who, at age 34 in April 2013, was charged with the first-degree murder of a 1-year-old girl, Rehma Sabir, in Middlesex County, Massachusetts. Brady McCarthy had been the child's nanny for the previous six months, and had been unlawfully in the United States since 2002, living in the Boston area. Her case and subsequent trial received international attention, and similarities were drawn with the case of Louise Woodward, a 19-year-old British nanny who was convicted of involuntary manslaughter after an eight-month-old child in her care died from a fractured skull and subdural hematoma in 1997. The charges against Brady McCarthy were dropped two years later, after it was determined that there was insufficient evidence to conclude that the child was murdered.

== The incident ==
On the afternoon of 14 January 2013, police in Cambridge, Massachusetts, responded to an emergency call reporting an unresponsive child. The baby was found breathing but unconscious, and was transported to Boston Children's Hospital and diagnosed with subdural and retinal hemorrhaging and cerebral swelling. The child was pronounced brain dead on 16 January, her first birthday.

== Accusation and proceedings ==
Brady McCarthy was charged with assault and battery, and then also charged with first-degree murder. Several aspects of the charges against Brady McCarthy led to calls for a further review of the evidence. It was revealed that the prosecution had withheld potentially important evidence in the case, and there was a call for additional study by the medical examiner. An eye specialist consulted by the prosecution had indicated that rather than being the result of blunt force trauma, the child's symptoms could have been the result of an immune disorder known as Job's syndrome. The child had a history of often being sick, and had pre-existing bone fractures in her spine dating from a time several weeks before her death when she had been taken on a family vacation and had not been in the care of the nanny.

In April 2015, the medical examiner rescinded the prior conclusion that the child's death had been a homicide caused by violent shaking, saying that "the overall state of Rehma's health and her past medical issues raise the possibility that she had some type of disorder that was not able to be completely diagnosed prior to her death", noting that the child had a history of bruising, thus raising "the possibility that the bleeding could have been related to an accidental injury in a child with a bleeding risk or possibly could have even been a result of an undefined natural disease".

On 1 September 2015, after Brady McCarthy had been held for 27 months in jail, and a further 3 months under House Arrest in Massachusetts, all charges against her were dropped. The District Attorney for Middlesex County, Marian Ryan said: "Based on an assessment of the present state of the evidence, including the amended ruling from the medical examiner who performed the autopsy, the Commonwealth cannot meet its burden of proof."

Brady McCarthy had been in the United States unlawfully since 2002 after overstaying a visa, and she was then arrested by U.S. immigration authorities, who allowed her to return on her own to Ireland in lieu of her potential deportation. In 2016, the child's parents, who had filed a civil suit with a wrongful death claim against Brady McCarthy, were awarded US$4 million (€3.6 million) in damages by a U.S. court. However, the family said they did not plan to press for payment of the judgment unless Brady McCarthy tried to profit from the media attention about the incident.

== Life after the incident ==
Brady McCarthy lives in Ireland with her husband, a fellow Irishman she married while living in the United States in September 2012, four months before the child's death.
