= Fire Station No. 7 (South Bend, Indiana) =

- Fire House No. 7
- U.S. National Register of Historic Places
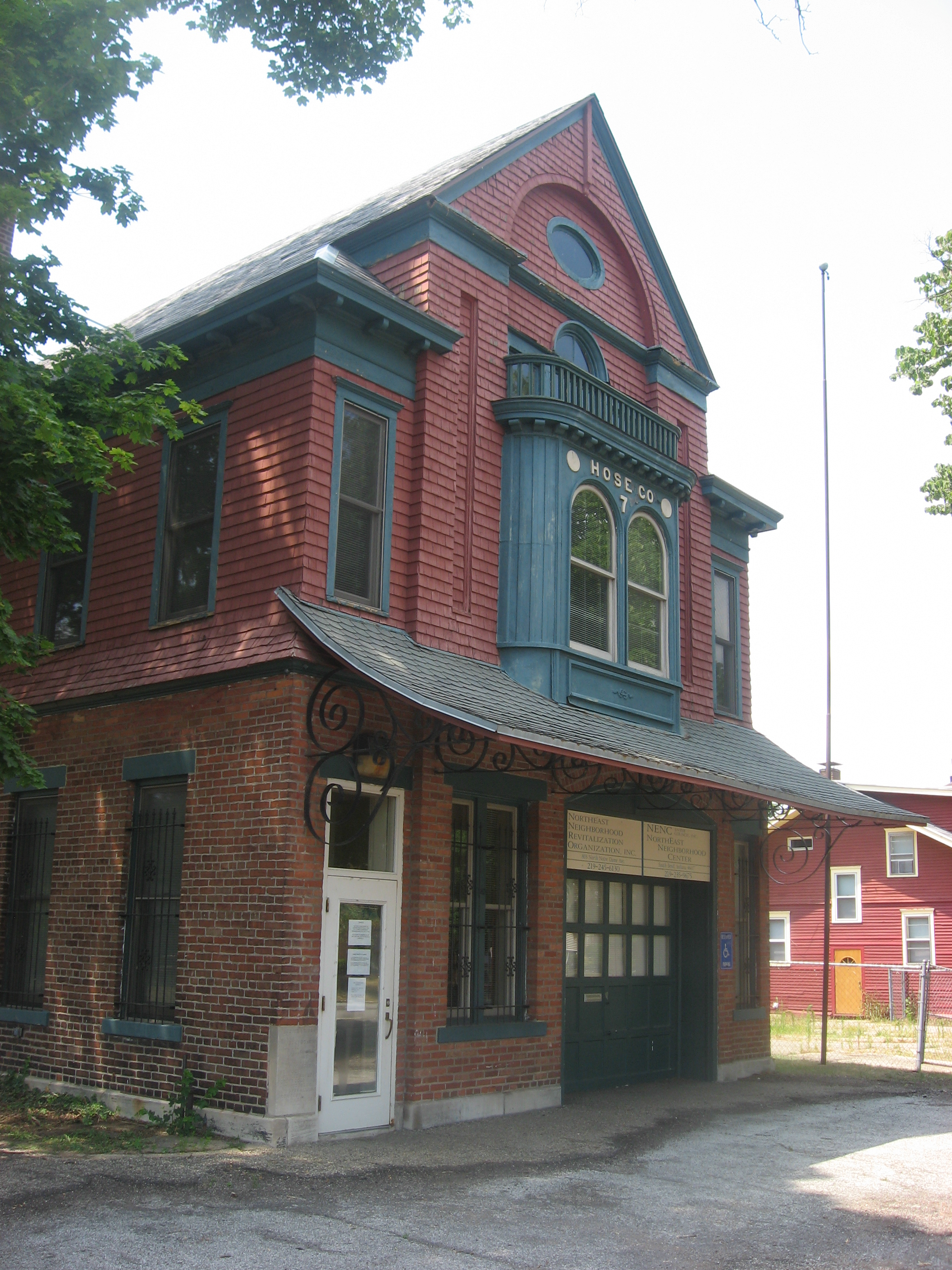
- Fire Station 7, July 2012

- Location within Indiana Location within the United States
- Location: 803 N. Notre Dame Ave., South Bend, Indiana
- Coordinates: 41°41′10″N 86°14′18″W
- Area: less than one acre
- Built: 1904
- Architect: Brehmer, Charles A
- Architectural style: Queen Anne, Shingle Style
- MPS: East Bank MPS
- NRHP reference No.: 99000170
- Added to NRHP: February 18, 1999

Fire Station No. 7 is a historic fire station located at South Bend, Indiana. It was built in 1904, and is a 2 1/2-story, Queen Anne style brick building with a Shingle Style upper story. It was used as a fire station until 1968, after which it was adapted for community uses.

It was listed on the National Register of Historic Places in 1999.
