= Blue Blood (2006 film) =

- Directed by: Stevan Riley
- Written by: Stevan Riley
- Produced by: Rafael Marmor and Stevan Riley
- Release date: April 2006 (Tribeca)
- Running time: 89 minutes
- Country: United Kingdom

Blue Blood is a documentary film that was released in UK cinemas in 2007 and showed on BBC2's Storyville in 2008. The film follows the paths of five students from Oxford University as they try to win a place on the Oxford University Amateur Boxing Club Varsity squad. Those who do will face off against students from the University of Cambridge and earn the right to call themselves a "Blue".

== Production ==
The film was shot and edited by the director Stevan Riley. The film was produced by Rafael Marmor and Stevan Riley. It premiered at the 2006 Tribeca Film Festival one year before it debuted in the UK.

== Reception ==
The film was nominated for the Variety New Documentary Award and for Best Film in the 2008 Evening Standard Film Awards. Director, Stevan Riley, was nominated for Best British Newcomer in the London Critics Circle Awards 2008.

== Legal issues ==
The film's cover and DVD case used an image of the Oxford skyline taken by a former Oxford University student, where permission was given only for posters and only with credit given, neither of which conditions were adhered to.

== See also ==
- List of boxing films
