= Jacaszek =

Polish electroacoustic musician

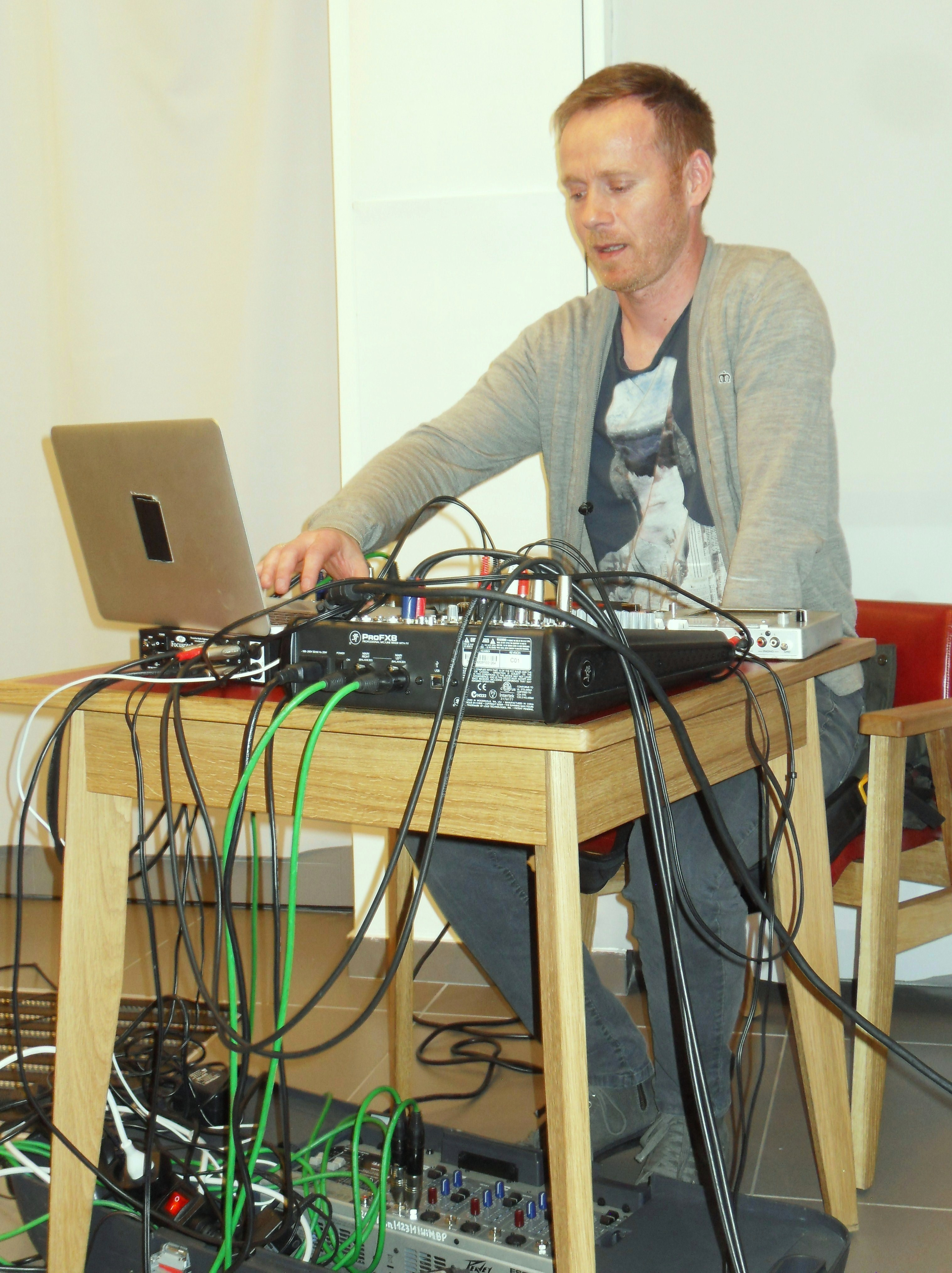
- Michał Jacaszek

Background information
- Birth name: Michał Jacaszek
- Also known as: Jacaszek
- Born: 19 May 1972 (age 52)
- Genres: Electroacoustic music, ambient, contemporary classical music, experimental music
- Years active: 1997–present
- Labels: Miasmah, Gusstaff Records, Ghostly International
- Website: jacaszek.com

Michał Jacaszek (born 19 May 1972) is a Polish electroacoustic musician, often credited on albums simply as Jacaszek.

== Discography ==
Studio albums

- (2004) Lo Fi Stories
- (2005) Lem Konzept
- (2005) Sequel
- (2006) Kompleta
- (2008) Treny (Miasmah)
- (2009) Pentral
- (2011) Glimmer
- (2013) Pieśni
- (2014) Catalogue des Arbres (Touch)
- (2017) KWIATY
- (2020) Music for Film
- (2020) Gardenia
- (2022) It Deel I

== Selected works ==
=== As composer ===
==== Feature films ====
- Golgota wrocławska by Jan Komasa (2008)
- Suicide Room by Jan Komasa (Iceland, 2011)

==== Short films ====
- Mami Fatale: On Tastier Tides by Marcin Wasilewski (Poland, 2012)
- Lost Senses by Marcin Wasilewski (Poland, 2014)
- Fugue for Cello, Trumpet and Landscape by Jerzy Kucia (Poland, 2014)
- The Showing by Jonathan Lang (2014)
- The Followers by Bill Kirstein (2014)

==== Documentaries ====
- Walking Under Water by Eliza Kubarska (Poland, 2014)
- The Bad Kids by Keith Fulton & Louis Pepe (USA, 2014)

==== Television series ====
- Mami Fatale (Poland, 2013)

== See also ==
- List of ambient music artists
