= University of Cambridge Sports Centre =

University sports centre in Cambridge, England

Coordinates: 52.2083°N 0.0858°E

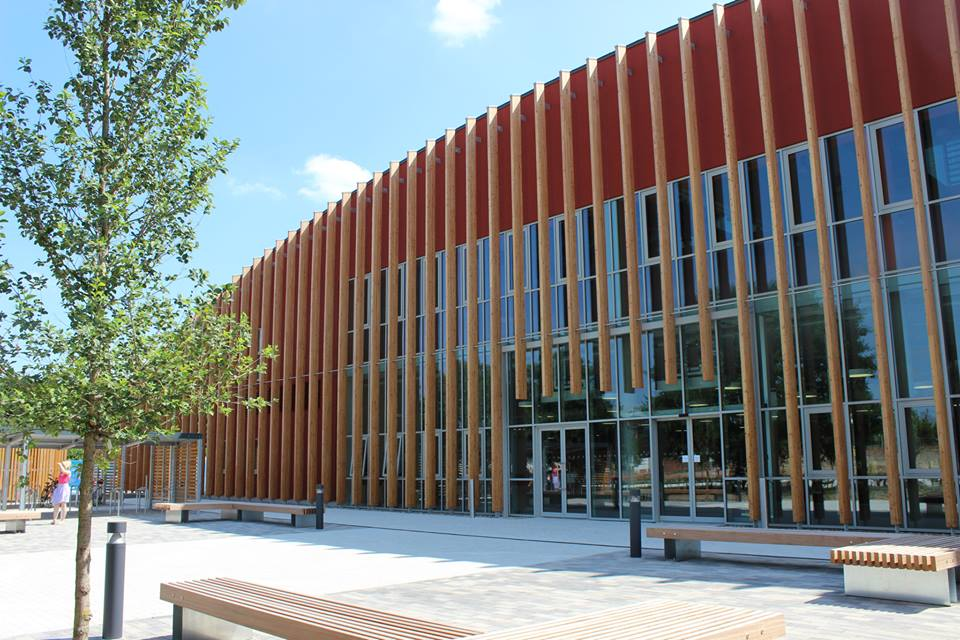
- Interactive map of University of Cambridge Sports Centre
- Location: Cambridge, England
- Country: England
- Establishment: 2013
- Owner: Cambridge University

The University of Cambridge Sports Centre is the Cambridge's main sporting facility.

== History ==
The University of Cambridge Sports Centre opened in West Cambridge in August 2013. The Physical Education Department moved its offices from Fenner's in Gresham Road to the new Centre. It was considered by many to be a long-overdue addition to the University.

== Facilities ==
The Sports Centre has a 37m x 34m Sports Hall with line markings for basketball, korfball, volleyball, five-a-side football, badminton, and netball. It also has tiered seating for up to 400 spectators.

The Fitness, Strength and Conditioning Suite is made up of a Fitness Suite, containing cardiovascular machines such as treadmills, ski ergs, Jacobs Ladders, and a Strength and Conditioning Room, with eight Olympic lifting platforms and a two-lane plyometric track.

There is a multi-purpose room for floor-based sports and classes such as fencing, martial arts, yoga, and Zumba, and there are Eton and Rugby fives courts.

There are also five glass-backed squash courts and a team-training area used by many university sports clubs.

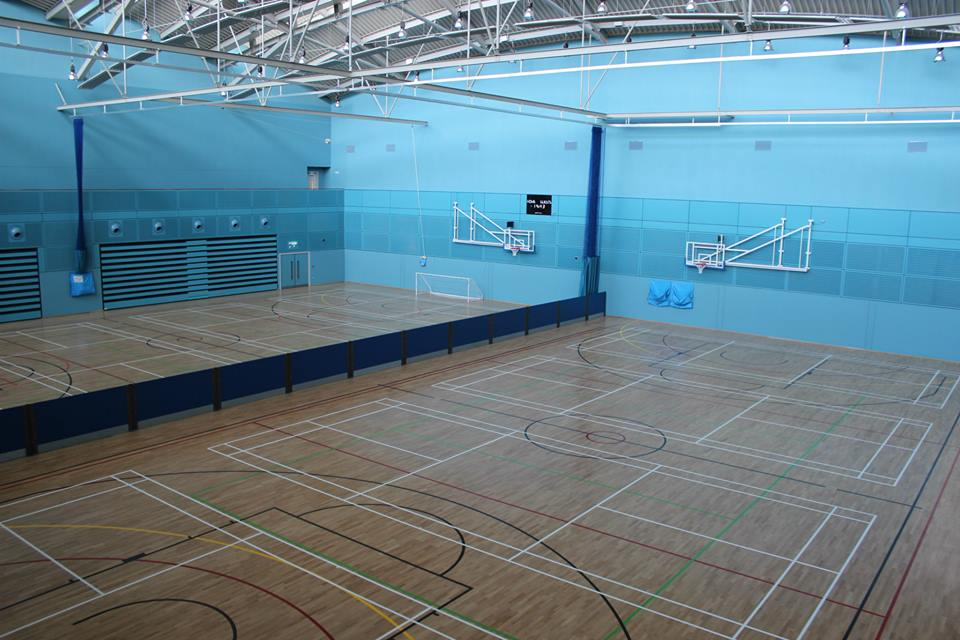
The University of Cambridge Sports Centre Sports Hall

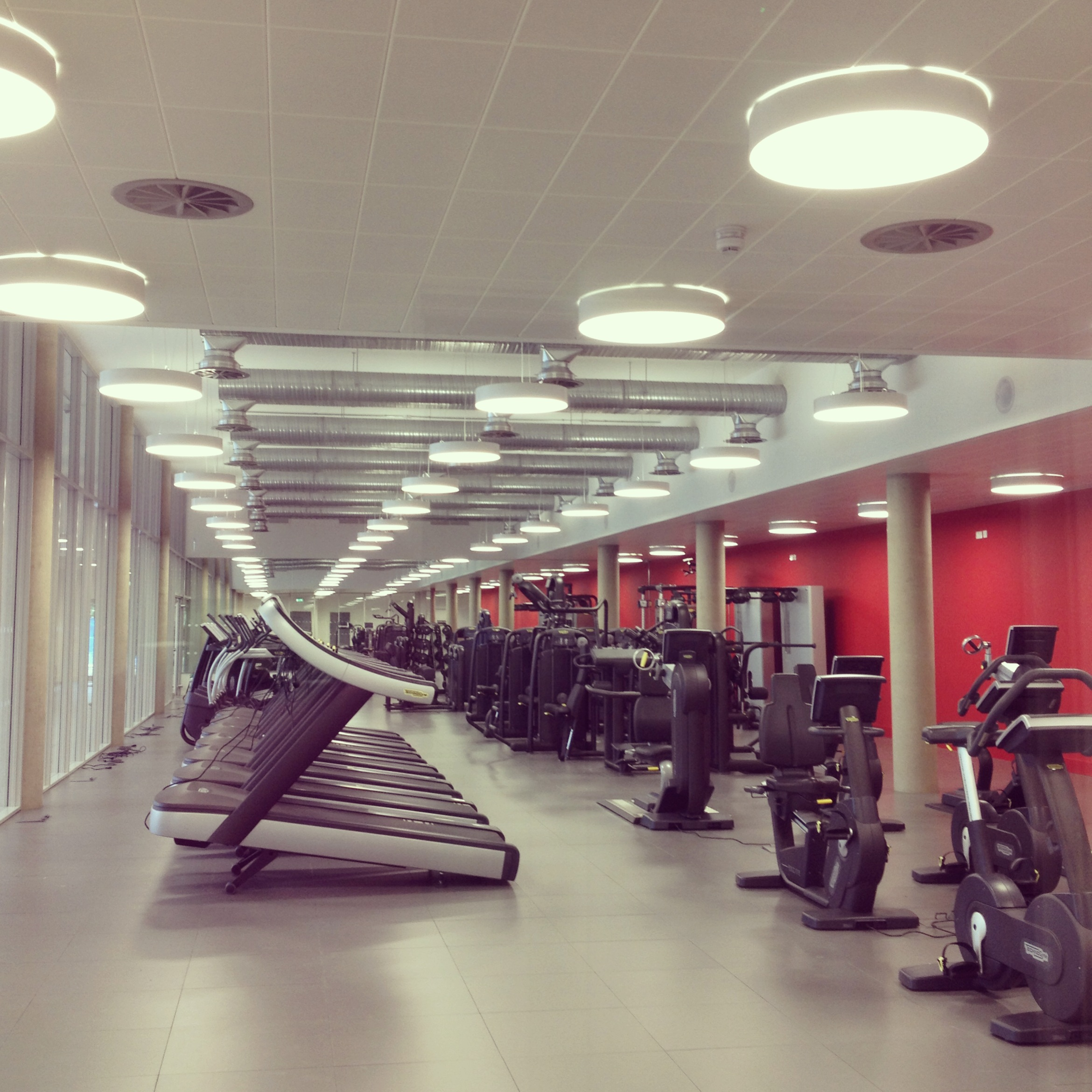
The University of Cambridge Sports Centre Fitness Suite

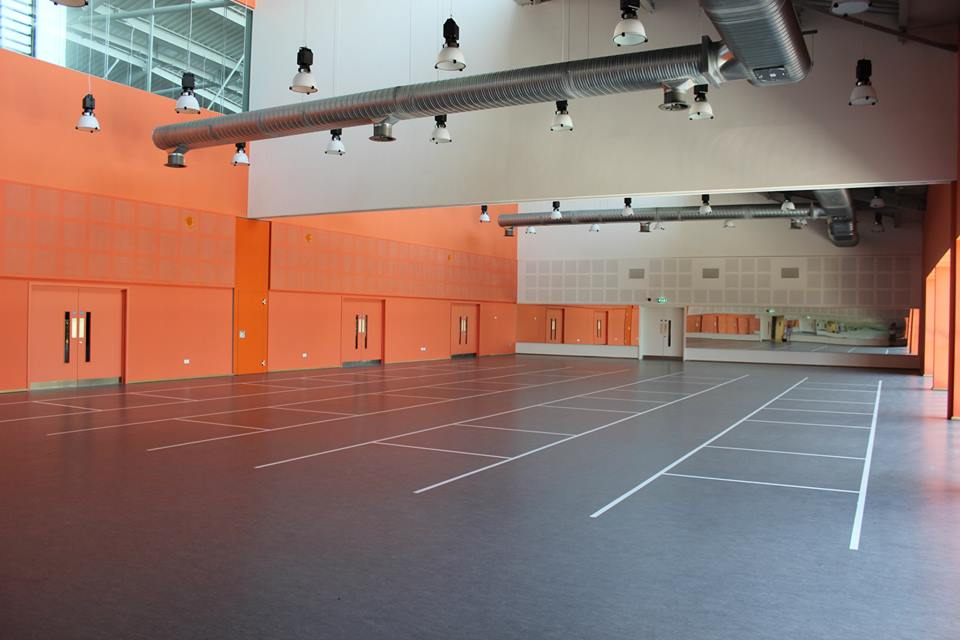
The University of Cambridge Sports Centre Multi Purpose Room

== Future developments ==
Discussions regarding potential future developments at the Sports Centre are underway, and these may include the addition of indoor and outdoor tennis courts, along with the potential inclusion of a swimming pool.

On April 2, 2019, the University revealed its plans to expand its West Cambridge site, including the addition of a swimming pool and indoor tennis courts. These upcoming sports facilities will be located near the newly developed Eddington community, situated on the North West Cambridge site near Huntingdon Road.

The plans are currently in their initial stages of development. The next phase of the project will involve creating architectural sketches to visualize the potential appearance of the building. Following this, there will be a period of public consultation.
