= Engine House No. 7 (Washington, D.C.) =

1884 fire station in Washington, US

Coordinates: 38°54′46″N 77°1′31″W

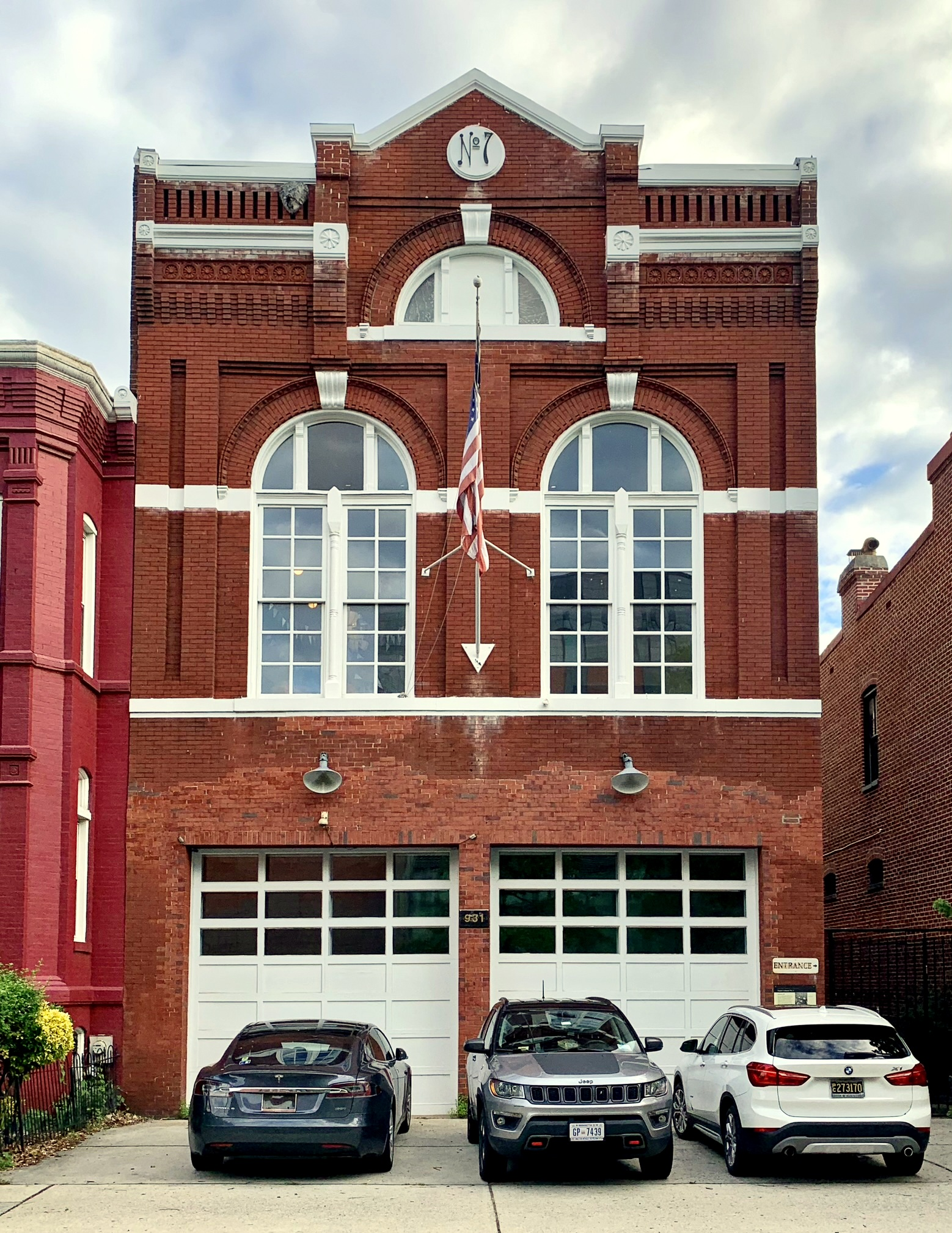
Engine House No. 7, also known as Engine Company No. 4, in 2023

Engine House No. 7 is one of the original Fire Station Houses established by the District of Columbia Fire Department in the late 19th century. Built in 1884, Engine House No. 7 was home to Engine Co. No. 7 before the segregation of the Department in 1940 when it then housed the historic first all-black fire squad, Engine Co. No. 4. After Engine Co. No. 4 moved to a new location in 1976, Engine House No. 7 was sold to private owners and turned into a major local art studio.

== History ==
The District of Columbia Fire Department was first established in 1871. Before that time, firefighting was carried out first by various private companies and volunteers from the two separate towns of the City of Washington and Georgetown, DC (originally Georgetown, MD). On April 25, 1864, the US government passed legislation allowing the district to form a part-time paid fire department. The early years were chaotic, with fire setting by the fire companies themselves not being unheard of — for a variety of motives that probably included everything from livening up a dull day to extortion. Additionally, when it became the practice to award the first fire company on the scene with a bounty paid by the city government, the firefighters at times became more interested in fighting one another than in battling the blaze.

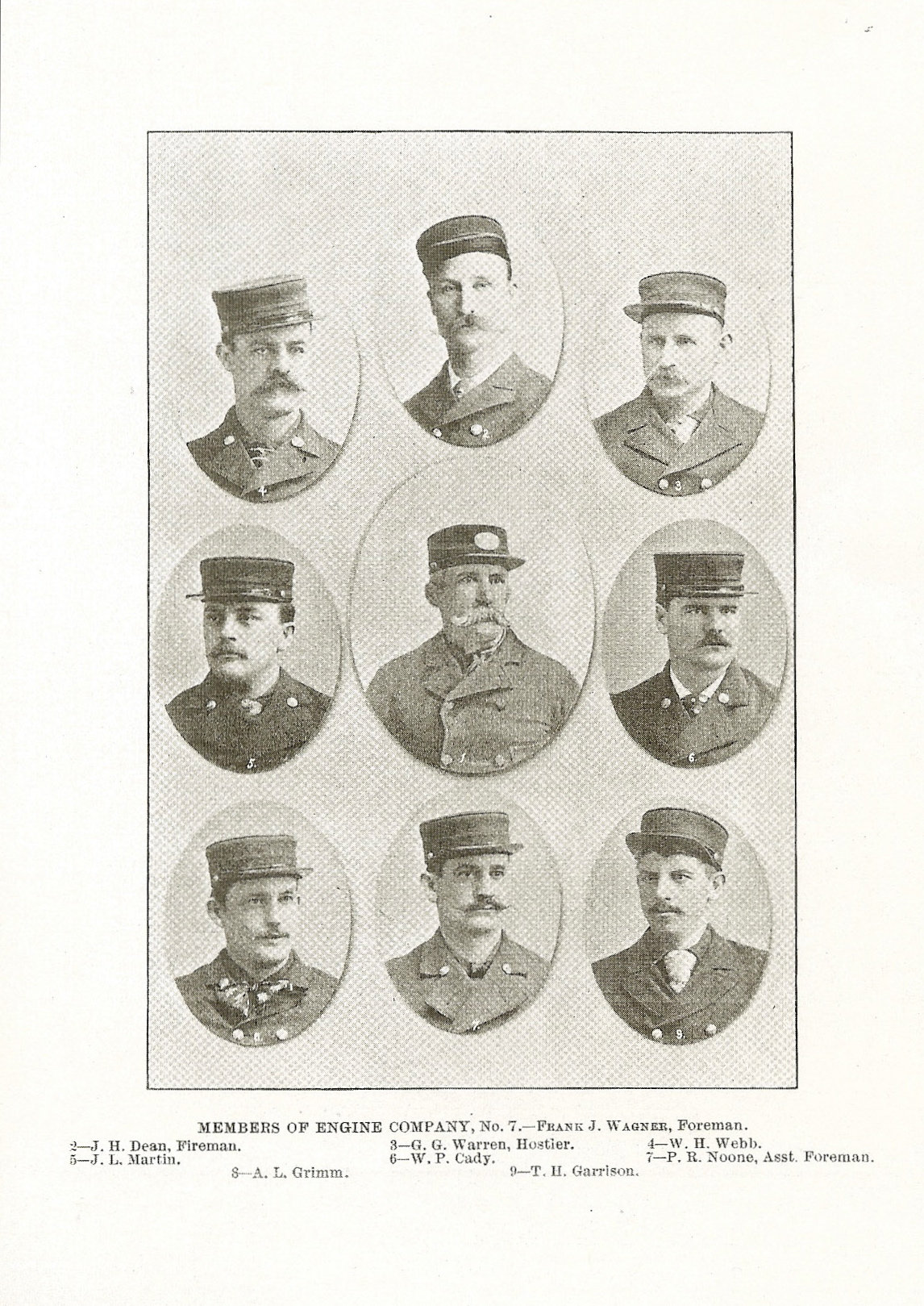
The Original Brigade of Engine Co. No. 7

At the time the D.C. Fire department was officially founded on September 23, 1871, there were five fire companies in all, but due to the increasing needs of the growing city, the fire department quickly expanded. In his annual report of 1883, Chief Engineer Cronin recommended that “a new company and a new engine house [be organized] somewhere northward of M street, between 7th and 14th Streets, N. W.” Following this recommendation, the firehouse located at 931 R St, N. W. was built during 1884, and first put into service on January 23, 1885 as Engine House No. 7. The firehouse was considered a model of efficient design, and was equipped with an 1885 450 GPM (gallon per minute) Clapp & Jones steam engine with an 1879 McDermott Bros. hose reel carriage. Installed just one month before the dedication of the newly completed Washington Monument, the Engine Company at 931 R Street was witness to some of the more spectacular and notorious fires and disasters of the District’s history. Within weeks after their establishment, Engine Co. No. 7 was called into service in February 1885 to help fight the National Theater fire. The 1885 fire was the third major fire at the National Theater site, and proved to be such a difficult fire to tame that the entire building burned down. The fire nearly killed multiple members of the fire department, but none of the injuries were as severe as those incurred by “Frank Wagner, the foreman of No. 7 Engine company, who, while directing a stream of water from the Harris house roof, was very badly burned about the hands and face.”

Engine Co. No. 7 also helped fight the fire at the Evening Star building on the morning of April 13, 1892. A young man had been burning paper refuse in the furnace and left the furnace doors open, which quickly created a large fire. After a general alarm was sounded, Engine Co. No. 7 soon arrived at the scene and fought the fire from the rear of the building. Luckily, no one was injured. The company was not as lucky in the fire of the Louisiana Avenue Commission House on May 18, 1896, where at least twenty-two buildings burned to the ground between 10th Street and B Street. Michael Berry, a private in the company, suffered severe injuries. Engine Co. No. 7 was also present at the January 1922 roof collapse at the Knickerbocker Theater, located at the corner of 18th Street and Columbia Road, N.W., which resulted in the deaths of 97 people.

Over the years the Fire Department changed in many ways, but nothing altered the face of the Department more than the official segregation of the force in 1919. During the debate over reorganization of the Department in 1940 in the Committee on the District of Columbia of the U.S. Senate, no mention is made of the segregated force, but the decisions of the Committee clearly reflect the facts. According to the report:

The National Board of Fire Underwriters recommend the merger of Engine Company No. 4 (470 Virginia Avenue, S.W.) with Truck Company No. 10 (347 K Street, S.W.) [sic]. The Committee believes this merger can better be accomplished and the same purpose of the consolidation effected by transferring Engine Company No. 7 (931 R Street, N.W.) to Truck No. 10, and by transferring Engine Company No. 4 to Engine House No. 7.

In other words, instead of simply combining two stations located in Southwest Washington, leaving the company of firefighters based in Northwest where they were, the Committee made its decision based on color lines, making the extra effort to combine white Engine Co. No. 7 with white Truck No. 10 and move the black Engine Co. No. 4 to Engine House No. 7. These prejudiced biases also affected the upgrades and renovations of the force’s equipment and facilities, for the Committee Report decided to make improvements only for the combined housing of these two new all-white companies, and they did not recommend any for the all-black Engine Co. No. 4.

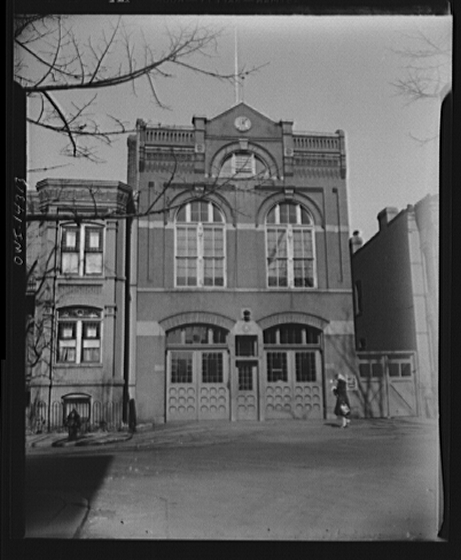
A Photograph Taken of Engine House No. 7 in 1940. Source: Library of Congress.

Engine Company No. 4 predated the establishment of the DCFD and was founded on February 21, 1870. It was originally known as “S. J. Bowen Engine 4,” but dropped the name after 1874. After the segregation of the Department in 1919, Engine No. 4 became the first all-black fire company in the District on April 3, 1919. When the Engine Co. No. 4 moved to Engine House No. 7 in 1940, the original station housing Engine Company No. 4 was abandoned and later sold by the District government.

With the Executive Order of 1962 officially desegregating the Department, many of the long-institutionalized racial tensions became even more pronounced. As both all-white and all-black fire companies were forcibly split apart, one firefighter, originally stationed as part of Engine Co. No. 4 at R Street, explained that:

Just after they decided to integrate I was sent over to 28 Engine and the officer there wasn’t too pleased at having blacks in his company and he let me know right away. I had been the pumper driver over at 4 Engine and had eighteen years on the job at the time; so I put in for second driver on my shift because I knew that I’d never become first driver over the white guy who had the job… [The white commanding officer responded to the man’s application for second driver by abolishing the position in the station.]

It took many years before all firefighters regardless of race or creed were treated fairly.

Engine House No. 7 at 931 R Street N.W. remained a working firehouse with Engine Co. No. 4, until the October 1976 when budgetary and other practical considerations during the tenure of Mayor Walter Washington forced the reorganization of the District Fire Department yet again, moving Engine Co. No. 4 to a new building at 2531 Sherman Avenue, N.W. The city fire department’s loss, however, became the art community’s gain. Engine House No. 7 was purchased under the District’s surplus property disposal program by harpsichord makers Tom and Barbara Wolf. The Wolfs manufactured harpsichords there until the summer of 1992, when District of Columbia artist Craig Kraft and Adrienne Beck purchased the building and renovated the lower level to become a studio. Today, many of the original architectural elements of the building remain, including the brick façade, double doors, clothing lockers, and switchboard.
