= Marian T. Ryan =

American lawyer

Marian Ryan
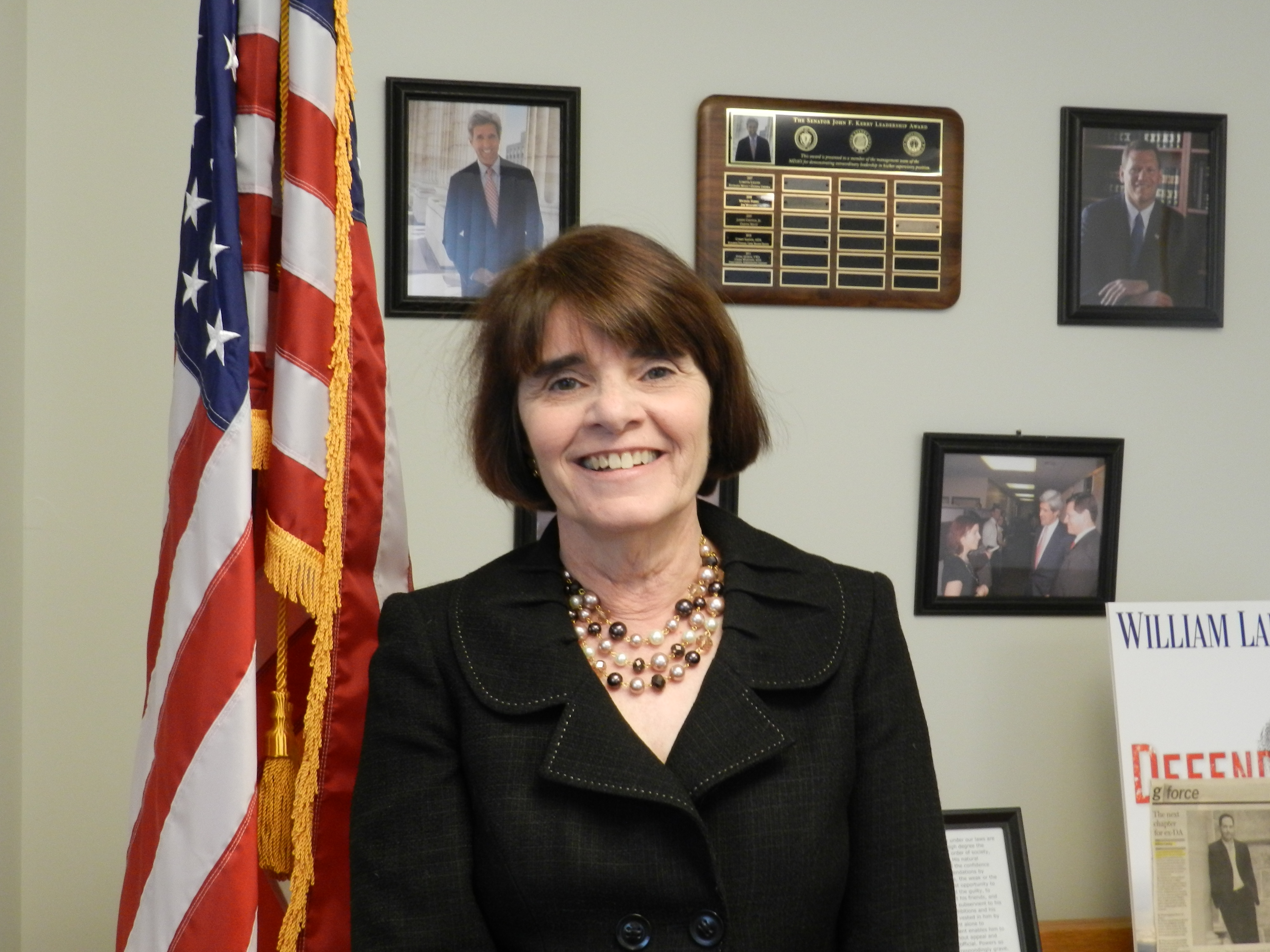

Massachusetts District Attorney for the Northern District
- Incumbent
- Assumed office April 2013
- Preceded by: Gerard Leone

Personal details
- Born: 1954 or 1955 (age 71–72) Cambridge, Massachusetts
- Party: Democratic Party
- Education: Emmanuel College Boston College Law School
- Occupation: Lawyer
- Website: http://middlesexda.com/

Marian T. Ryan is the District Attorney (DA) of Middlesex County, Massachusetts, United States. She was the Commonwealth's only female District Attorney from 2013 to 2018 and became the only female again in 2022 (after Rachael Rollins resigned to become U.S. Attorney for MA and Andrea Harrington lost her re-election bid). She is a Democrat.

== Early life and education ==
Ryan was born in Cambridge and raised in Somerville. She graduated from Emmanuel College in 1976. and Boston College Law School in 1979.

== Career ==
Ryan began her career in the Middlesex DA's Office immediately after law school. She served in multiple leadership positions, including Chief of the Domestic Violence Unit and Chief of the Elder and Disabled Unit.

In 1980, she was assaulted during an attempted armed robbery in which her boyfriend, Edward T. Bigham III, also an Assistant District Attorney, was shot and killed.

In 2013, Ryan was appointed Middlesex County District Attorney by Governor Deval Patrick after Gerard Leone resigned to become a partner at the law firm of Nixon Peabody. In 2014, she faced a primary challenge from Michael A. Sullivan, the Middlesex County Clerk of Courts. After winning the primary election, she ran unopposed in the general election.

In 2018, Ryan defeated Donna Patalano, a former prosecutor in the Suffolk County District Attorney's Office and defense attorney, in the Democratic primary and was unopposed in the November general election.

In a move to minimize lasting effects on people accused of committing crimes, in 2021 District Attorney Ryan created a process to allow requests for certain identifying information to be redacted from the office's website. In cases where the request is denied, there is the possibility for a partial redaction or updating the information to reflect the outcomes of the cases. This change was made to balance the public's access to information with the right to privacy of the accused, especially in the case of juveniles charged as youthful offenders.

=== Racial justice initiatives ===
In March 2021, District Attorney Ryan hired Antonia Soares Thompson to be Middlesex County's first Director of Racial Justice Initiatives. The position was created to create cultural competency trainings for prosecutors and local police departments in Middlesex. These efforts are intended to foster greater trust in the community. The creation of this new position continued District Attorney Ryan's commitment to racial justice initiatives in Middlesex County which include the formation of the Anti-Hate, Anti-Bias Task Force and emphasis on diversionary measures.

== Controversies and criticisms ==
=== Withholding exculpatory evidence ===
Under Ryan's tenure as Middlesex County District Attorney, the Office has twice been accused of withholding exculpatory evidence (evidence that might raise doubt about the accused's guilt) resulting in dropped charges after the information was eventually released. One example stems from a "shaken-baby" homicide case where Aisling Brady McCarthy was accused of killing the one-year-old for whom she had been caring. She was charged after one prosecution medical expert initially concluded that the one-year-old had suffered injuries, including severe bleeding in the back of the eyes, which indicated abusive head trauma, also known as shaken baby syndrome, according to the expert. McCarthy was put in custody without bail following her arraignment and prior to trial. While investigating the case, prosecutors sought the opinion of Dr. Alex Levin, an eye specialist, on whether the injuries to the baby's eyes indicated abuse. In a series of phone calls starting in August 2013, Levin expressed hesitation about coming to that conclusion. He told prosecutors that his findings raised the possibility that the baby's injuries might have been caused by something other than abuse — an immune disorder called Job Syndrome — according to a court document. In spite of the fact that United States and Massachusetts Supreme Court law, Rules of Criminal Procedure, and attorneys' ethical guidelines unequivocally require that any evidence that might raise questions of guilt must immediately be turned over to the defense, Marian T. Ryan's office did not release all of the information they had on the subject for 16 months following the first phone call with Dr. Levin. Charges were eventually dropped, but not before McCarthy had been held without bail for over a year. Ryan conceded that the information in question "should have been released sooner". Ryan's office was criticized for similar reasons in another, earlier, case involving a similar set of facts involving the death of a six-month-old baby and charges against Nathan Wilson. In that earlier case, the doctor working for the prosecution told reporters that when he told Ryan's office that he wished to reverse his earlier ruling that the death was a homicide, "Middlesex District Attorney Marian Ryan and her office 'bullied' him to stick with the original homicide ruling, even though new evidence made that conclusion not 'honest'."

=== Deficiencies found by independent review ===
In 2013 the Middlesex District Attorney's Office was criticized for its handling of Jared Remy, who was arrested for assault and battery on Jenna Martel on August 13, 2013, and then released on his own recognizance two days before she was found dead in the couple's apartment in Waltham. There was no active restraining order between the two at the time of Martel's death, and the Middlesex District Attorney's office did not ask the arraigning judge to continue to hold Remy on the domestic violence charges despite his legal history, which reportedly included 13 criminal complaints against him since 1998, six of those for assault and battery. In December 2013 an independent review by a Norfolk County prosecutor and a former Essex County District Attorney found Ryan's office's handling of the case to be deficient, concluding: "Remy's domestic violence criminal history, the facts in the August 13th, 2013 police report, and the fact that there was a young child in the home were not given sufficient weight, while the victim's decision to not come to court to extend the emergency restraining order or to request further conditions was given excessive consideration in the evaluation." When the Boston Globe requested the independent reviewers' report in 2014, Ryan withheld 19 pages, including summaries of interviews with prosecutors and victim advocates about Remy's arraignment following his arrest, and also the table of contents, which according to the Globe "[made] it impossible for the public to know that portions of the review were excluded".

=== Criticism of the office by the United States Supreme Court ===
In March 2016 in Caetano v. Massachusetts, the United States Supreme Court reversed the conviction of a woman who had protected herself against her abusive and violent ex-boyfriend with a stun-gun. In a concurring opinion, Justice Samuel Alito, a former federal prosecutor, criticized the decision by Ryan's office to prosecute the woman, writing: "A State's most basic responsibility is to keep its people safe. The Commonwealth of Massachusetts was either unable or unwilling to do what was necessary to protect [the defendant], so she was forced to protect herself. To make matters worse, the Commonwealth chose to deploy its prosecutorial resources to prosecute and convict her".

=== Criticism by subordinates ===
Fifteen months after her appointment as District Attorney, 66 of about 240 of Ryan's former employees had left the office. According to one veteran homicide prosecutor who had recently left the office, "The employees of the Middlesex DA's office are deeply committed and extremely hard-working despite the current executive leadership who often treats them in demeaning and disparaging ways ... It's mismanagement to treat them in a harsh, demeaning way and mismanagement to base supervisory decisions on the fear of media criticism." Many other former prosecutors interviewed asked to remain anonymous and then generally reported a "culture of dysfunction at the office", stating that they left "because they were concerned about how the office was being run."

== Personal ==
Ryan resides in Belmont. She and her husband, Michael Foley, have two children.
