= Fire Station No. 7 (Brookline, Massachusetts) =

- U.S. National Register of Historic Places
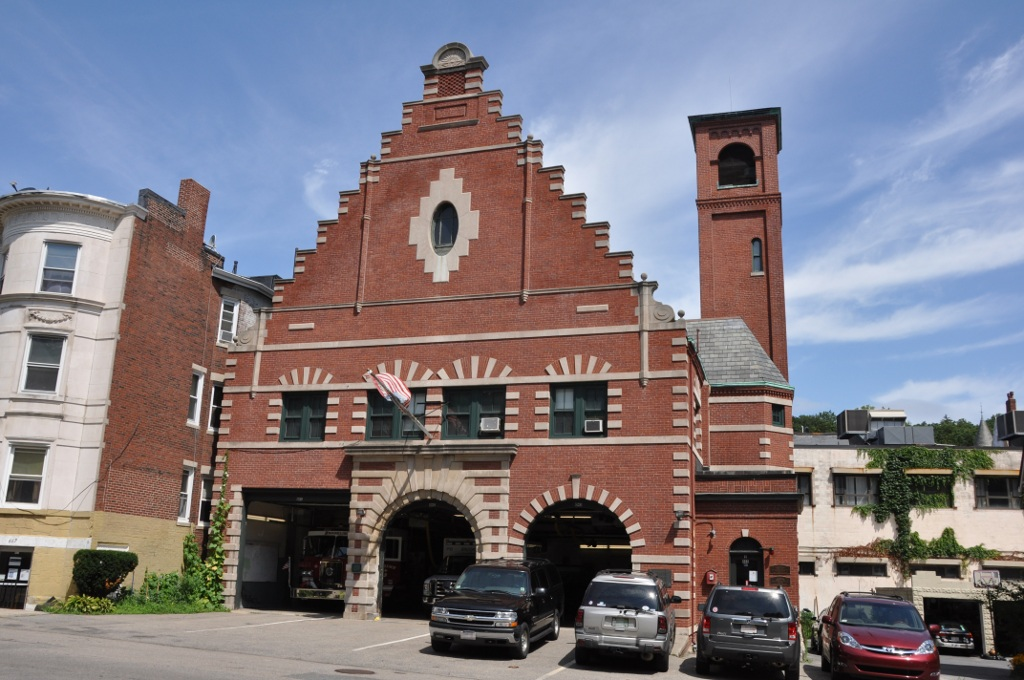

- Location within Massachusetts Location within the United States
- Location: 665 Washington St., Brookline, Massachusetts
- Coordinates: 42°20′19″N 71°8′2″W
- Area: less than one acre
- Built: 1898
- Architect: Crosby, G. Fred
- Architectural style: Renaissance, Dutch
- MPS: Brookline MRA
- NRHP reference No.: 85003265
- Added to NRHP: October 17, 1985

Fire Station No. 7, also known as the Washington Square Station, is a historic fire station at 665 Washington Street in Brookline, Massachusetts. Built in 1898, it is an architecturally eclectic mix of Dutch and Renaissance Revival styles. The building was listed on the National Register of Historic Places in 1985. It presently houses Engine 3 and a paramedic ambulance.

== Description and history ==
Fire Station No. 7 is located near the commercial village center of Washington Square, on the north side of Washington Street roughly midway between Beacon and Fairbanks Streets. It is a 2 1/2-story masonry structure, built out of brick with stone trim. Its distinctive facade features include a Dutch Revival stepped gable, window and doorway arches with alternating stone and brick voussoirs, and a square Italianate hose drying tower. It has three equipment bays, two of which retain their original arched tops, while that on the left has been squared to admit larger modern equipment.

The building was designed by Boston architect and Brookline native G. Fred Crosby, and went into service in 1898. It was described at the time as being state of the art, and is the only one of the town's fire houses that has Dutch Revival features. Its original wooden doors were replaced in 1947, and the left equipment bay entrance was enlarged in 1951.

== See also ==
- National Register of Historic Places listings in Brookline, Massachusetts
