= Oxford University Amateur Boxing Club =

Boxing club of University of Oxford, England

The Oxford University Amateur Boxing Club (OUABC) is the boxing club of the University of Oxford, England, located in Oxford. The club was founded in 1881. It is the second-oldest active amateur boxing club in the UK. Several OUABC boxers were featured in a 2006 documentary titled Blue Blood.

Originally combined with the fencing club, the two sports split into separate clubs in 1913. It became defunct during the 1960s, but was reformed in 1968–1969 under the leadership of Robert Nairac. Members who later went on to prominence include Eric Lubbock, James Douglas-Hamilton, Colin Moynihan, and Kris Kristofferson.

The club competes against Cambridge University Amateur Boxing Club in The Varsity Match, also known as The True Love Bowl, each year. Typically, the match location switches between Oxford and Cambridge, though some matches have been held in London.

In 2003/2004, OUABC began including female boxers in training and matches. In the 2005 Varsity Match, Kaleen Love of Oxford was the first Oxford woman to compete in a Varsity boxing match, and defeated Catherine Tubb of Cambridge Both were awarded Extraordinary Full Blues for their athletic accomplishments.

During the 1980s and 1990s, under the tutelage of head coach Henry Dean, OUABC won 17 Varsity Matches in a row, the longest single stretch of victories in the history of the tournament. However, since then the Match results have been more balanced; and in both the 2005 and 2009 Varsity Matches, OUABC registered defeats by the maximum 9–0 margin. Cambridge University Amateur Boxing Club (CUABC) remains the only side to have achieved this feat since the number of bouts was increased to 9 in the 1950s. For a time, Cambridge had taken to hosting the match every second year in London, due to seating limitations at Cambridge venues, with the 2009 match recorded for a documentary aired on Channel 4.

== See also ==
- Oxford–Cambridge rivalry
- Varsity match
