= Watha T. Daniel =

American activist

Watha T. Daniel (1911 – December 8, 1973) was the first chairman of the DC Model Cities Commission and long time civic activist in the Shaw Neighborhood of Washington, D.C. He was a master plumber by profession, and he served as chairman of the D.C. Plumbing Board.

== Professional life ==
Daniel graduated from St. Paul's Polytechnic Institute, now St. Paul's College, in Lawrenceville, Virginia in 1930. After serving his time as a journeyman plumber he moved to Washington, D.C., in 1935. In 1940 he became one of the first African-Americans to be licensed as a master plumber in the District of Columbia. During World War II, Daniel served as a pipe fitting supervisor for the Kaiser Co. in Seattle Shipyards. He returned to Washington, D.C., after the war was over and opened the Watha T. Daniel Plumbing and Heating Co. In 1967 he became the first African-American appointed to the DC Plumbing Board, and served as its chairman at the time of his death.

== Civic life ==
Watha T. Daniel was deeply engaged in the livelihood of the Shaw Neighborhood and served on numerous boards and commissions. He served on the DC Board of Education's Board of Examiners for Trade Instructors. He was also chairman of the Citizens Housing Advisory Council. Mayor Walter E. Washington appointed Mr. Daniel to the Mayor's Advisory Committee on Health and the District's LEAA Criminal Justice Advisory Committee. In the 1960s Mr. Daniel was elected to the Citizens Advisory Committee of the Shaw Neighborhood Development Center, and he became a charter member of the Model Inner City Community Organization (MICCO). Later becoming vice-president of MICCO. He also served as the chairman of the DC Model Cities Commission, an urban renewal program, between 1968 and 1972.

== The Watha T. Daniel/Shaw Neighborhood Library ==
On September 27, 1975 the DC Public Library opened the Watha T. Daniel/Shaw Neighborhood Library. Originally slated to be the "Shaw Branch Library", the library at 8th and Rhode Island Ave. NW was dedicated in honor of Mr. Daniel prior to opening.
