= Stevan Riley =

British film director, producer, editor and writer

Stevan Riley (born November 1975) is a British film director, producer, editor and writer. He was educated at the University of Oxford, where he studied Modern History. His films include Blue Blood (2006); Fire in Babylon (2010); Everything or Nothing (2012); and Listen to Me Marlon (2015). Stevan went to school in Dover, Kent, Dover Grammar for Boys.

== Biography ==
Riley's first documentary Rave Against the Machine (2002) explored the underground music scene in Sarajevo during the Bosnian War. It aired on UK's Channel Four and was showcased internationally by the British Council. The film received nine international awards including Special Jury Prize at Aspen Shorts Fest; National Geographic Award at Sydney Film Fest; Best Documentary at Dubrovnik Film Fest; and Best Documentary at DIY Hollywood.

Riley's first feature, Blue Blood. presented the Varsity boxing rivalry between the universities of Oxford and Cambridge. Variety called it one of the "best sports movies in recent memory". It was screened in UK cinemas by Warner Bros and aired on BBC Storyville and the Sundance Channel. Blue Blood earned Riley nominations for Best Film at the Evening Standard Film Awards and Best British Newcomer by the London Critics' Circle.

His next film was the award-winning documentary Fire in Babylon, about the record-breaking West Indies cricket team of the 1970s and 1980s. Fire in Babylon was released in UK cinemas by Revolver Entertainment and aired on BBC Storyville and ESPN. It earned Riley a Grierson Award as well as a nominations for Best Documentary at the British Independent Film Awards and Evening Standard Film Awards. Film critic Barry Norman listed it in his 'Top 10 Sports films of all time'.

Riley next directed Everything Or Nothing, an official film for EON Productions to commemorate the 50th Anniversary of the James Bond films. Mirroring in its structure and tone a classic Bond movie, it tells the survival story of how Bond became the longest running film franchise in history. Variety labelled it "a splendid documentary" and The Wall Street Journal as "crammed to overflowing with sparkling tidbits."

His biographical film about Marlon Brando, Listen to Me Marlon, was made in conjunction with Showtime and Universal Pictures. It debuted in the Official Selection of the Sundance Film Festival 2015, before being shortlisted for an Academy Award and receiving a Peabody Prize. The National Board of Review listed it in their top 5 documentaries of 2015. It is described by Rolling Stone magazine as "the man himself, Marlon Brando, in his own words. With narration provided by tapes of the actor speaking about fame, his craft, and his eventual hatred of both." Variety called it "a superb portrait" and Hollywood Reporter "marvellously creative and enthrallingly intimate".

Stevan edited a short, 'Pearl', that was nominated for an Academy Award in 2017.

== Filmography ==
- Rave Against the Machine (2002)
- Blue Blood (2006)
- Fire in Babylon (2010)
- Everything Or Nothing: The Untold Story of 007 (2012)
- Listen to Me Marlon (2015)
