= The Airborne Toxic Event discography =

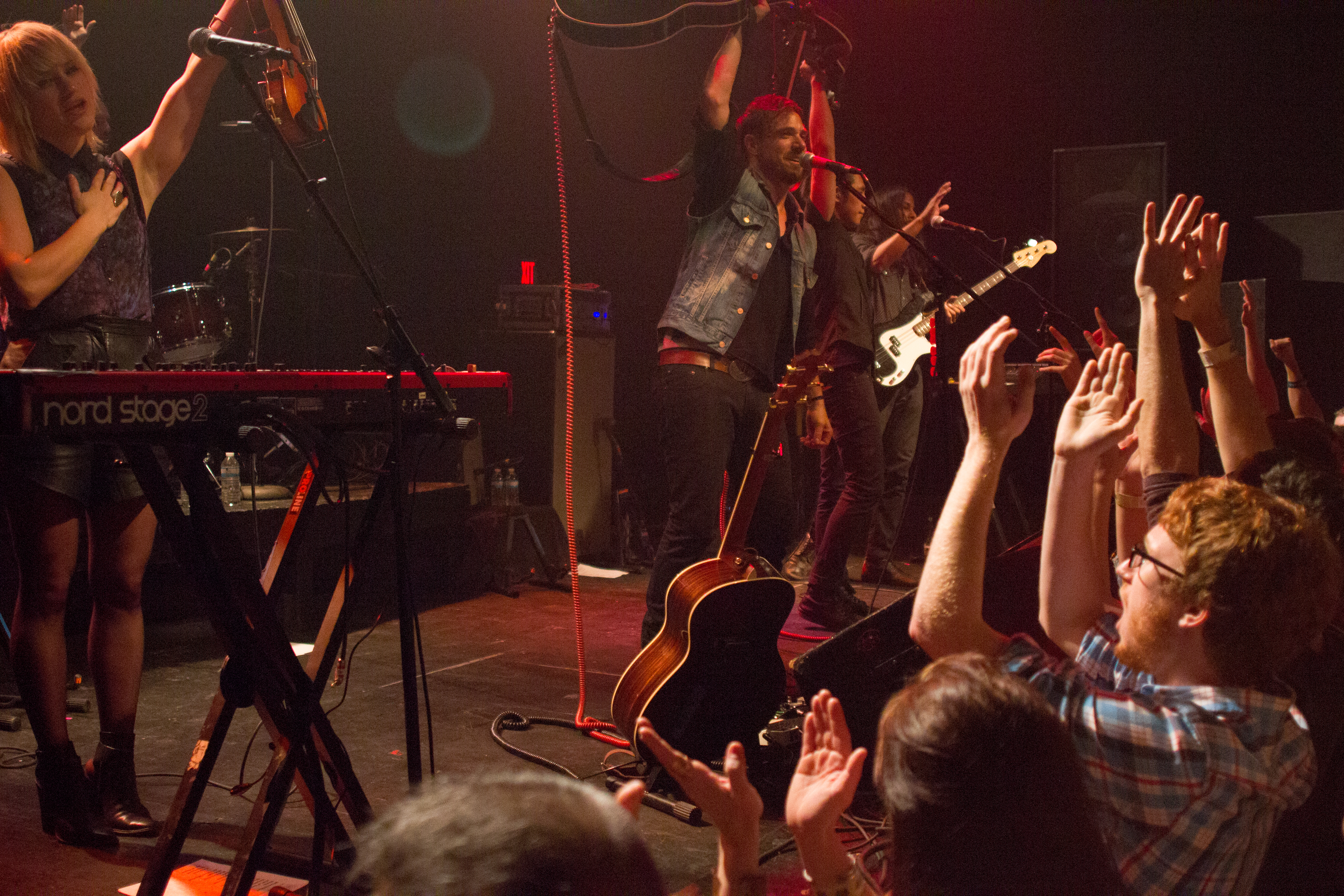
- The Airborne Toxic Event performing in 2014
- Studio albums: 7
- EPs: 3
- Live albums: 1
- Singles: 15

This is the discography for American alternative rock band The Airborne Toxic Event.

== Albums ==
=== Studio albums ===
List of studio albums, with selected chart positions
Title	Album details	Peak chart positions							
Title	Album details	US	US Alt.	US Rock	BEL (FL)	GER	SCO	UK	UK Indie
The Airborne Toxic Event	Released: August 5, 2008 (US); Label: Majordomo; Formats: CD, LP, download	108	—	35	70	—	36	35	—
All at Once	Released: April 26, 2011 (US); Label: Island; Formats: CD, download	17	4	5	—	85	49	61	—
Such Hot Blood	Released: April 30, 2013 (US); Label: Island; Formats: CD, LP, download	27	9	10	—	—	—	150	41
Dope Machines	Released: February 24, 2015 (US); Label: Epic; Formats: CD, LP, download	56	8	14	—	—	—	—	—
Songs of God and Whiskey	Released: April 28, 2015 (US); Label: Epic; Formats: CD, LP, download	—	—	—	—	—	—	—	—
Hollywood Park	Released: May 22, 2020; Label: Rounder; Formats: CD, LP, download	— (Note: Hollywood Park did not enter the US Billboard 200, but peaked at number 18 on the Album Sales Chart.)	—	—	—	—	32	— (Note: Hollywood Park did not enter the UK Albums Chart, but peaked at number 54 on the UK Album Sales Chart.)	—
Glory	Released: July 16, 2024; Label: Little Tokyo; Formats: Download	—	—	—	—	—	—	—	—
"—" denotes a recording that did not chart or was not released in that territory.

=== Live albums ===
List of live albums, with selected chart positions
Title	Album details	Peak chart positions
Title	Album details	UK Video
All I Ever Wanted: Live from Walt Disney Concert Hall (featuring Calder Quartet)	Released: September 28, 2010 (US); Label: Island; Formats: CD, DVD, Blu-ray, digital download	41

=== Extended plays ===
List of extended plays, with selected chart positions
Title	Album details	Peak chart positions		
Title	Album details	US	US Alt.	US Rock
Does This Mean You're Moving On?	Released: 2007 (US); Label: Self-released; Formats: CD, digital download	—	—	—
Happiness Is Overrated	Released: 2009 (US); Label: Universal; Formats: CD, digital download	—	—	—
The Secret	Released: March 11, 2013 (US); Label: Island; Formats: Digital download	114	21	32
"—" denotes a recording that did not chart or was not released in that territory.

== Singles ==
List of singles, with selected chart positions, showing year released and album name
Title	Year	Peak chart positions										Certifications	Album
Title	Year	US Bub.	US Adult	US Rock	BEL (FL)	CAN Rock	EU	MEX	SCO	UK	UK Indie	Certifications	Album
"Gasoline"	2008	—	—	—	—	—	—	—	—	—	—		The Airborne Toxic Event
"Sometime Around Midnight"	2008	15	27	23	29	20	76	30	14	33	— (Note: "Sometime Around Midnight" did not enter the UK Independent Singles Chart, but peaked at number 17 on the UK Independent Singles Breakers Chart.)	RIAA: Gold	The Airborne Toxic Event
"Wishing Well"	2009	—	—	49	—	—	—	—	—	—	—		The Airborne Toxic Event
"Does This Mean You're Moving On?"	2009	—	—	—	—	—	—	—	—	— (Note: "Does This Mean You're Moving On?" did not enter the UK Singles Chart, but peaked at number 93 on the UK Physical Singles Chart Top 100.)	12		The Airborne Toxic Event
"Neda"	2010	—	—	—	—	—	—	—	—	—	—		Non-album single
"Changing"	2011	4	—	12	—	27	—	48	—	—	—		All at Once
"Numb"	2011	—	—	—	—	—	—	—	—	—	—		All at Once
"Half of Something Else"	2011	—	—	— (Note: "Half of Something Else" did not enter the Hot Rock & Alternative Songs chart, but peaked at number 46 on the Rock Digital Songs chart.)	—	—	—	—	—	—	—		All at Once
"All I Ever Wanted"	2011	—	—	45	—	43	—	—	—	—	—		All at Once
"Timeless"	2013	—	—	— (Note: "Timeless" did not enter the Hot Rock & Alternative Songs chart, but peaked at number 21 on the Rock Airplay chart.)	—	—	—	—	—	—	—		Such Hot Blood
"The Storm"	2013	—	—	—	—	—	—	—	—	—	—		Such Hot Blood
"Hell and Back"	2013	—	—	— (Note: "Hell and Back" did not enter the Hot Rock Songs chart, but peaked at number 37 on the Rock Airplay chart.)	—	—	—	—	—	—	—		Dallas Buyers Club
"Wrong"	2014	—	—	— (Note: "Wrong" did not enter the Hot Rock & Alternative Songs chart, but peaked at number 37 on the Alternative Airplay chart.)	—	—	—	—	—	—	—		Dope Machines
"California"	2015	—	—	—	—	—	—	—	—	—	—		Songs of God and Whiskey
"America"	2016	—	—	—	—	—	—	—	—	—	—		Non-album single
"Come on Out"	2020	—	—	— (Note: "Come on Out" did not enter the Hot Rock & Alternative Songs chart, but peaked at number 33 on the Alternative Airplay chart.)	—	—	—	—	—	—	—		Hollywood Park
"Faithless"	2022	—	—	—	—	—	—	—	—	—	—		Non-album single
"—" denotes a recording that did not chart or was not released in that territory.

=== Guest appearances ===
List of non-single guest appearances, showing year released and album name
Title	Year	Album
"I Don't Want to Be on TV"	2009	NCIS: The Official TV Soundtrack
"Wishing Song"	2011	Muppets: The Green Album
"Boots of Spanish Leather"	2012	Chimes of Freedom
"No More Lonely Nights"	2014	The Art of McCartney

=== Music videos ===
- "Does This Mean You're Moving On?" (2007, Directed by Jason Wishnow)
- "Sometime Around Midnight" (2008, Directed by Jason Wishnow)
- "Gasoline" (2008, Directed by Billy Johnson)
- "Sometime Around Midnight" (2009, New Version, Directed by D.J. Caruso)
- "Happiness is Overrated" (2009, Directed by Jon Danovic)
- "Changing" (2011, Directed by Jon Danovic)
- "Numb" (2011, Directed by Jon Danovic)
- "All I Ever Wanted" (2011, Directed by Jon Danovic)
- "Timeless" (2013, Directed by Jon Danovic)
- "Come on Out" (2020, Directed by Silvia Grav)
