= The Airborne Toxic Event (album) =

Studio album by The Airborne Toxic Event
- Released: August 5, 2008
- Recorded: 2007–2008
- Studios: Pete Min's home studio (Los Angeles, California)
- Genres: Indie rock; post-punk revival; alternative rock
- Length: 37:33
- Label: Majordomo
- Producers: The Airborne Toxic Event; Pete Min

The Airborne Toxic Event chronology
Does This Mean You're Moving On? EP (2007)	The Airborne Toxic Event (2008)	All at Once (2011)

Professional ratings
Aggregate scores
Source	Rating
Metacritic	66/100
Review scores
Source	Rating
AllMusic	3/5 stars
The A.V. Club	C+
Blender	3/5 stars
Drowned in Sound	7/10
Entertainment Weekly	B+
The Guardian	4/5 stars
Pitchfork	1.6/10
PopMatters	7/10
Q	4/5 stars
Uncut	4/5 stars

The Airborne Toxic Event is the debut studio album by American rock band The Airborne Toxic Event. It was first released on August 5, 2008, through Majordomo Records. It was later re-released by Island Records on March 16, 2009, following the band's signing to the label. The entire album was recorded using a recording studio in the home of Pete Min, the band's producer.

The album was released in the UK on February 9, 2009 and features three bonus tracks. The album's first single, "Gasoline", was released on November 17, 2008, and was used in the soundtracks for FIFA 09 and as a playable track in Band Hero. "Sometime Around Midnight" was released on February 2, 2009, and later reached #4 on the Billboard Hot Modern Rock Tracks chart.

== Track listing ==
No.	Title	Writer(s)	Length
1.	"Wishing Well"	Mikel Jollett	3:57
2.	"Papillon"	Jollett	3:18
3.	"Gasoline"	Noah Harmon; Jollett	3:21
4.	"Happiness Is Overrated"	Harmon; Jollett	3:12
5.	"Does This Mean You’re Moving On?"	Jollett	2:14
6.	"This Is Nowhere"	Anna Bulbrook; Stephen Chen; Harmon; Jollett; Daren Taylor	2:50
7.	"Sometime Around Midnight"	Jollett	5:04
8.	"Something New"	Harmon; Jollett	3:07
9.	"Missy"	Jollett	3:40
10.	"Innocence"	Jollett	6:50
Total length:			37:33

European bonus tracks
No.	Title	Length
11.	"The Winning Side"	4:14
12.	"This Losing"	3:35
13.	"The Girls In Their Summer Dresses"	3:19

iTunes Deluxe Edition
No.	Title	Length
11.	"The Winning Side"	4:14
12.	"This Losing"	3:35
13.	"The Girls In Their Summer Dresses"	3:19
14.	"Gasoline" (Acoustic Version)	3:35
15.	"Sometime Around Midnight" (Acoustic Version)	4:52
16.	"Sometime Around Midnight" (Music Video – Majordomo Version)	5:03

== Singles ==
- "Gasoline" (November 17, 2008)
  1. "Gasoline" – 3:20
  2. "The Winning Side" – 4:16
- "Sometime Around Midnight" (February 2, 2009)
  1. "Sometime Around Midnight" – 5:03
  2. "Innocence" (Acoustic) – 8:50
- "Happiness Is Overrated" (June 8, 2009)
  1. "Happiness Is Overrated"
  2. "I Don't Want to Be on TV"

== Personnel ==
- Mikel Jollett – vocals, guitar, keyboards
- Steven Chen – lead guitar, keyboards
- Anna Bulbrook – keyboards, viola, backing vocals
- Noah Harmon – bass
- Daren Taylor – drums
- Evren Göknar – mastering engineer (Capitol Mastering)

== Charts ==
Chart (2008)	Peak position
Belgian Albums Chart (Flanders)	70
U.S. Billboard 200	108
U.S. Billboard Top Heatseekers	1
UK Albums Chart	35
