= Hollywood Park =

Hollywood Park may refer to:

== Places ==
=== United States ===
- Hollywood Memorial Park Cemetery in Los Angeles, California
- Hollywood Park, Chicago, a neighborhood in North Park, Chicago, Illinois
- Hollywood Park, Inglewood, an entertainment complex and master-planned neighborhood in Inglewood, California
  - Hollywood Park Casino
  - Hollywood Park Racetrack, a former thoroughbred racetrack and the site of the new neighborhood
- Hollywood Park, Sacramento, a neighborhood in Sacramento, California
- Hollywood Park, Texas, a town in Bexar County surrounded by the City of San Antonio, Texas
- Hollywood Park Racetrack (New Jersey), a former thoroughbred racetrack in West End, Monmouth County
- Lake Hollywood Park, surrounding the Hollywood Reservoir, Hollywood Hills, Los Angeles, California

=== Worldwide ===
- Hollywood Park, Barrow, retail and leisure complex in Cumbria, England

== Music ==
- Hollywood Park (album), 2021 studio album by The Airborne Toxic Event

== See also ==
- Hollywood (disambiguation)
