= The Hounds Below =

American indie rock band

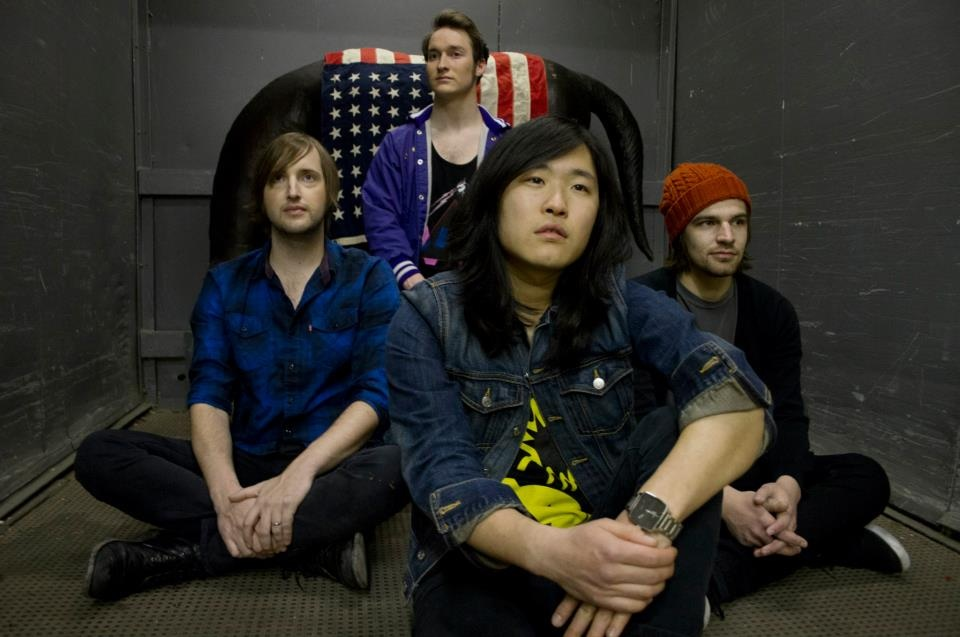
- The Hounds Below in 2013.

Background information
- Origin: Ferndale, Michigan, United States
- Genres: Indie rock; post-punk revival
- Years active: 2009–present
- Labels: Slimstyle; In the Act
- Spinoffs: Ponyshow
- Spinoff of: The Von Bondies
- Members: Jason Stollsteimer; Will Shattuck; Adam Michael Lee Padden; Mathew Hofman
- Past members: Ben Collins; Molly Jean Schoen; Skye Thrasher; Griffin Bastian; Sean Lynch; Brandon McDonald; Jesse Shepherd-Bates; Nick Adams
- Website: thehoundsbelow.com

The Hounds Below are an American rock band from Ferndale, Michigan consisting of Jason Stollsteimer (lead vocals, guitar), Will Shattuck (drums), Adam Michael Lee Padden (bass, backing vocals), and Mathew Hofman (guitar). The band was formed in 2009, while Stollsteimer was still recording and touring with The Von Bondies. The Hounds Below released a self-titled EP in 2011 and released their debut album, You Light Me Up In The Dark, in 2012.

The band has shared the stage with Black Rebel Motorcycle Club, Ash, The Heavy, The Raveonettes, The Grates, The Horrors, The Black Angels, Company of Thieves, Airborne Toxic Event, The Cribs, The Like, Band of Skulls and The Whigs.

== Band members ==
Current members

- Jason Stollsteimer − lead vocals, guitar
- Will Shattuck − drums
- Adam Michael Lee Padden − bass, backing vocals
- Mathew Hofman − guitar

Former members

- Ben Collins − guitar
- Sean Lynch − guitar
- Brandon McDonald − drums
- Molly Jean Schoen − bass
- Skye Thrasher − guitar
- Griffin Bastian − drums
- Jesse Shepherd-Bates − bass
- Nick Adams − drums

== Discography ==
Studio albums

- You Light Me Up In The Dark (2012)

EPs

- The Hounds Below (2011)

== See also ==
- List of indie rock musicians
- Music of Detroit
