= List of indie rock musicians =

This is a list of notable indie rock artists. Individual musicians are listed alphabetically by their last name.

== A ==
- Alcian Blue
- The Amazing
- American Standards
- Anamanaguchi
- Arab Strap
- Augustines
- Awolnation

Back to top

== B ==
- Babyshambles
- Bad Astronaut
- Baryonyx
- Belle and Sebastian
- Beware of Darkness
- Blackmail
- Bleachers
- Bleech 9:3
- Bloc Party
- Bloody Knees
- Boy Kill Boy
- Billy Bragg
- Bonfire Madigan
- Brasil
- Built to Spill.

Back to top

== C ==
- Camber
- Cardiacs
- Chavez
- Clap Your Hands Say Yeah
- Colossal
- Colour Revolt
- Cornershop
- Cranes
- Crying
- Curve

Back to top

== D ==
- The Dandy Warhols
- Days Away
- The Decemberists
- Deerhoof
- Desaparecidos
- Dolo Tonight
- Dover
- The Dream Syndicate
- Duster
- The Dykeenies

Back to top

== E ==
- Eagulls
- Enon
- Ever We Fall
- Exit Clov

Back to top

== F ==
- The Feelies
- Figurines
- The Fire Engines
- Flower
- Foster the People
- The Fratellis

Back to top

== G ==
- Geese
- Go Sailor
- Good Kid
- Grandaddy
- Grass Widow
- Grenadine
- The Griswolds
- Grizzly Bear
- Guadalcanal Diary

Back to top

== H ==
- Ha Ha Tonka
- High Vis
- The Hounds Below
- HY

Back to top

== I ==
- Idlewild (band)
- Les Incompétents
- Indigo De Souza
- Island of Love

Back to top

== J ==
- Jaguar Love
- Joan of Arc
- Johnny Foreigner

Back to top

== K ==
- The Karl Hendricks Trio
- The KBC
- Kettcar
- Kitchens of Distinction

Back to top

== L ==
- Jasper Leach
- Letters to Cleo
- Life Without Buildings
- Lightning Dust
- Little Man Tate
- Look Mexico
- Lush

Back to top

== M ==
- Math the Band
- Male Bonding
- Meneguar
- Mitski
- Tony Molina
- Motion City Soundtrack
- Miracle Musical

Back to top

== N ==
- Neutral Milk Hotel
- Nilüfer Yanya

Back to top

== P ==
- P.E.E.
- Panchiko
- Parquet Courts
- Pavement
- Pompeii
- Ponyshow

Back to top

== R ==
- Ratboys
- Razorcuts
- Red Animal War
- Relient K
- The Rock*A*Teens
- Russian Winters

Back to top

== S ==
- Shrag
- Silver Jews
- Sissy Bar
- Six Going On Seven
- The Smiths
- The Snake the Cross the Crown
- Snowden
- The Softies
- The Strange Death of Liberal England
- Sugar
- Supreme Dicks

Back to top

== T ==
- Tall Ships
- Tattle Tale
- Tally Hall
- Thinking Fellers Union Local 282

Back to top

== U ==
- Ultra Vivid Scene
- The Unicorns
- The Unlikely Candidates

Back to top

== V ==
- The Vaccines
- Voyager One

Back to top

== W ==
- Wallows
- The War on Drugs
- Wild Beasts

Back to top

== Y ==
- Yo La Tengo
- Yukon Blonde

Back to top

== See also ==
- List of indie pop artists
