= Rescue Me (soundtrack) =

Soundtrack album by Various Artists
- Released: March 30, 2006
- Genre: Alternative rock
- Label: Nettwerk

Rescue Me is the official soundtrack to the American dark comedy TV show Rescue Me. The official soundtrack was released on May 8, 2006 on Nettwerk records.

== Track listing ==
1. "C'mon C'mon" - The Von Bondies – 2:14
2. "Devil" - Stereophonics – 4:41
3. "I'll Be Your Man" - The Black Keys – 2:21
4. "Bonnie Brae" - The Twilight Singers – 4:50
5. "All the Wild Horses" - Ray LaMontagne – 3:17
6. "Shine a Light" - Wolf Parade – 3:44
7. "Karaoke Soul" - Tom McRae – 3:53
8. "Love is Blindness" - The Devlins – 3:15
9. "Fell on Bad Days" - Rubyhorse – 3:58
10. "Wipe That Smile Off Your Face" - Our Lady Peace – 4:24
11. "Open Heart Surgery" - The Brian Jonestown Massacre – 4:14
12. "Oh Yeah" - The Subways – 2:58
13. "Pussywillow" - Greg Dulli – 3:40
14. "Just a Dream" - Griffin House – 6:29

== In Show Music ==
Below is a list of the music used in individual episodes of the series, including music not included in the soundtracks.

- "C'mon C'mon" by The Von Bondies - Theme Song for the Show
- "Don't Panic" by Coldplay - Season 1, Episode 1 "Guts"
- "Sign of Respect" by Mastersource - Season 1, Episode 2 "Gay"
- "Stronger Than Dirt" by Tom McRae - Season 1, Episode 2 "Gay"
- "Never Run" by The Bitch Allstars - Season 1, Episode 2 "Gay"
- "Summer's Over" by The Stafford 4 - Season 1, Episode 4 "DNA"
- "When All Is Said and Done" by Tyrone Wells - Season 1, Episode 4 "DNA"
- "What Is It Now?" by Edison - Season 1, Episode 5 "Orphans"
- "Chasing Dreams" by Magnet - Season 1, Episode 5 "Orphans"
- "Goodbye to Yesterday" by Edison - Season 1, Episode 5 "Orphans"
- "Refuse to Lose" by Black Toast - Season 1, Episode 5 "Orphans"
- "Bossa Me" by Chris Falson - Season 1, Episode 6 "Revenge"
- "Can't Go On Livin'" by The Bitch Allstars - Season 1, Episode 7 "Butterfly"
- "Karaoke Soul" by Tom McRae - Season 1, Episode 7 "Butterfly"
- "All I Can Do" by Tyrone Wells - Season 1, Episode 8 "Inches"
- "Goodbye" by The Three Men Out - Season 1, Episode 8 "Inches"
- "Amazing Grace" by the FDNY Pipe and Drum - Season 1, Episode 8 "Inches"
- "I'll Be Your Man" by The Black Keys - Season 1, Episode 9 "Alarm"
- "Any Other Way" by Public - Season 1, Episode 10 "Immortal"
- "Soul Shifter" by Mastersource - Season 1, Episode 10 "Immortal"
- "To Know Your Love" by Devin Powers - Season 1, Episode 10 "Immortal"
- "Lucky" by Miss Bizzario - Season 1, Episode 11 "Mom"
- "No Clarify" by Jeff Cardoni - Season 1, Episode 11 "Mom"
- "LAPMZ2543" by LA Post - Season 1, Episode 12 "Leaving"
- "Just a Dream" by Griffin House - Season 1, Episode 12 "Leaving"
- "Fell On Bad Days" by Rubyhorse - Season 1, Episode 13 "Sanctuary"
- "Out of Training" by Jeff Cardoni - Season 1, Episode 13 "Sanctuary"
- "Stand Tall" by Edison - Season 1, Episode 13 "Sanctuary"
- "In This Place" by Scott Aaronson - Season 1, Episode 13 "Sanctuary"
- "Let Somebody Love Me" by Solomon Burke - Season 2, Episode 6 "Reunion"
- "Broken" by Alaska! - Season 2, Episode 6 "Reunion"
- "Pussywillow" by Greg Dulli - Season 2, Episode 9 "Rebirth"
- "Run" by Snow Patrol - Season 2, Episode 10 "Brains"
- "Make It Up" by Ben Kweller - Season 2, Episode 11 "Bitch"
- "All the Wild Horses" by Ray LaMontagne - Season 2, Episode 12 "Happy"
- "Devil" by Stereophonics - Season 3, Episode 1 "Devil"
- "Bonnie Brae" by The Twilight Singers - Season 3, Episode 2 "Discovery"
- "Shine a Light" by Wolf Parade - Season 3, Episode 5 "Chlamydia"
- "Open Heart Surgery" by The Brian Jonestown Massacre - Season 3, Episode 5 "Chlamydia"
- "Oh Yeah" by The Subways - Season 3, Episode 8 "Karate"
- ”Hell is Round the Corner” by Tricky - Season 3, Episode 12 “Hell”
- "Swing Low" by Rocco DeLuca and the Burden - Season 4, Episode 9 "Animal"
- "Front Street" by The Gutter Twins - Season 5, Episode 1 "Baptism"
- "J'arrive à la ville" by Lhasa de Sela - Season 5, Episode 3 "Wine"
- "The Guns of Brixton" by The Clash - Season 5, Episode 4 "Jimmy"
- "Glory Box" by Portishead - Season 5, Episode 9 "Thaw"
- "Shame" by Enablers - Season 5, Episode 9 "Thaw"
- "Synthetic Self" by Apache Stone - Season 5, Episode 10 "Control"
- "If You Stayed Over" by Bonobo - Season 5, Episode 10 "Control"
- "Captured Blues" by Enablers - Season 5, Episode 11 "Mickey"
- "Syrup and Honey" by Duffy - Season 5, Episode 12 "Disease"
- "New York" by Cat Power - Season 5, Episode 13 "Torch"
- "Break My Heart" by The Love Me Nots - Season 5, Episode 15 "Initiation"
- "My Blue Manhattan" by Ryan Adams - Season 5, Episode 17 "Lesbos"
- "Got Messed Up" by R.L. Burnside - Season 5, Episode 18 "Carrot"
- "Walk Away" by Dropkick Murphys - Season 5, Episode 19 "David"
- "Grounds for Divorce" by Elbow - Season 5, Episode 21 "Jump"
- "This Is the Army of Forgotten Souls" by Transglobal Underground - Season 5, Episode 22 "Drink"
- "Fresh Blood" by Eels - Season 6, Episode 1 "Legacy"
- "Come on Over (Turn Me On)" by Isobel Campbell & Mark Lanegan - Season 6, Episode 4 "Breakout"
- "It Had to Be You" by Tony Bennett - Season 6, Episode 7 "Forgiven"
- "Who Am I" by Chapter 3 - Season 6, Episode 8 "Cowboy"
- "More Than I Have (Nashville)" by Jennifer Clarke - Season 6, Episode 10 "A.D.D."
- "I've Got the World on a String" by Frank Sinatra - Season 7, Episode 2 "Menses"
- "Beyond This World" by The Enablers - Season 7, Episode 4 "Brownies"
- "Dirty Old Town" by The Pogues - Season 7, Episode 9 "Ashes"

Note - "Wipe That Smile off Your Face" and "Love is Blindness" weren't aired during the show.
