= Love, Hate and Then There's You =

Studio album by The Von Bondies
- Released: February 3, 2009
- Genre: Alternative rock; garage rock; indie rock; post-punk revival; punk blues
- Length: 35:39
- Label: Majordomo
- Producer: Butch Walker; Rick Parker

The Von Bondies chronology
| Pawn Shoppe Heart (2004) | Love, Hate and Then There's You (2009) |

Singles from The Von Bondies
- 1. "Pale Bride" Released: 2008

Professional ratings
Review scores
| Source | Rating |
|---|---|
| AllMusic | 3.5/5 stars |
| JustPressPlay | 4/10 |
| NOW | 2/5 stars |
| Pitchfork Media | 5.8/10 |
| Rolling Stone | 3/5 stars |
| Spin | 3.5/5 stars |

Love, Hate and Then There's You is the third studio album by the American alternative rock band, The Von Bondies. It was released on February 3, 2009. It is their only album for Majordomo Records. This is their first studio album in five years.

== Track listing ==
All songs written by Jason Stollsteimer except where noted.

1. "This Is Our Perfect Crime" - 2:57
2. "Shut Your Mouth" - 2:22
3. "Pale Bride" - 2:55
4. "Only to Haunt You" - 3:13
5. "21st Birthday" - 3:18
6. "She's Dead to Me" - 1:24
7. "Chancer" - 3:35
8. "Blame Game" (Blum, Stollsteimer) - 2:53
9. "I Don't Wanna" - 2:36
10. "Accidents Will Happen" - 2:45
11. "Earthquake" (Blum, Stollsteimer) - 3:04
12. "Modern Saints" - 4:31

== Personnel ==
- Jason Stollsteimer – lead vocals, lead guitar
- Christy Hunt – rhythm guitar, backing vocals
- Leann Banks – bass guitar, backing vocals
- Don Blum – drums, percussion
