= The Von Bondies =

American rock band

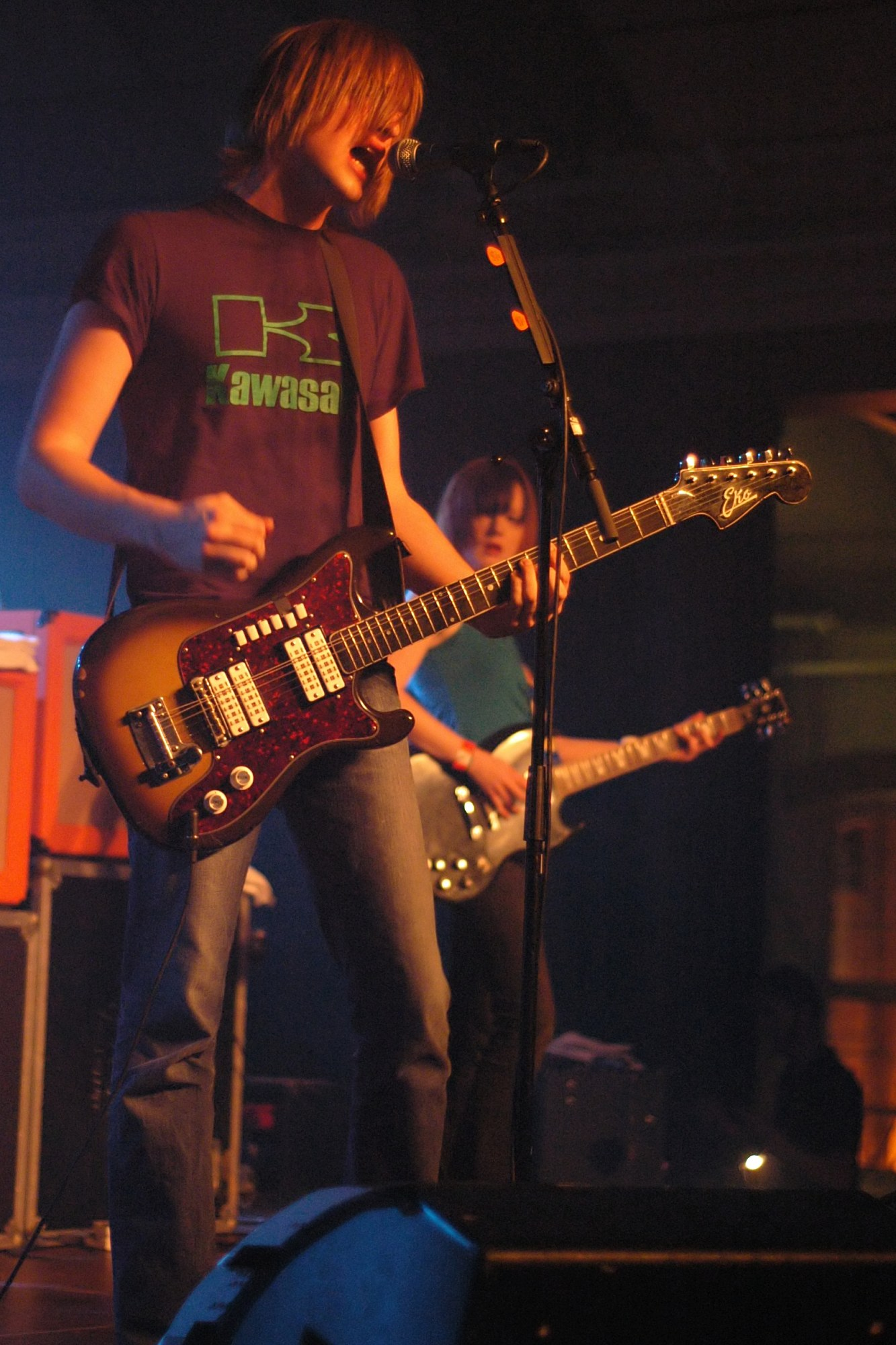
- The Von Bondies in Stockholm, Sweden in 2004.

Background information
- Also known as: Baby Killers
- Origin: Detroit, Michigan, United States
- Genres: Alternative rock; indie rock; garage rock revival; post-punk revival; punk blues (early)
- Years active: 1997–2011, 2020–present
- Labels: Majordomo; Fierce Panda; Sire; Sympathy for the Record Industry; Dim Mak; In the Act; Model Citizen
- Spinoffs: The Hounds Below; Ponyshow
- Members: Jason Stollsteimer; Don Blum; Leann Banks; Christy Hunt
- Past members: Carrie Ann Smith; Marcie Bolen; Yasmine Smith; Lauren Wilcox
- Website: thevonbondies.com

The Von Bondies are an American rock band formed in Detroit, Michigan in 1997. The band's breakthrough album, Pawn Shoppe Heart, was released in 2004 and features the singles "C'mon C'mon" and "Tell Me What You See".

The Von Bondies have headlined tours of the United Kingdom/Europe, Australia, and the United States, taking along supporting bands like The Kills, Kasabian, Franz Ferdinand, Modey Lemon, SSM, The Subways, The Stills, Hot Panda and The Donnas. They have also appeared on Late Show with David Letterman, Last Call with Carson Daly and CD:UK.

The group disbanded in July 2011. They reformed in 2020 and planned a reunion tour, but those plans had to be abandoned due to the COVID-19 pandemic. The band's members have since become involved in other musical projects.

== History ==
=== Formation and Lack of Communication (1997–2001) ===
In 1997, Jason Stollsteimer and Marcie Bolen attended a concert by The Cramps and the Japanese garage punk band Guitar Wolf. At the time, Stollsteimer was working a job as a bowling alley bartender and Marcie as a hairdresser. The performance spurred them to create their own band, Baby Killers, which toured with fellow Detroit bands The Detroit Cobras, The Go, and The White Stripes. After recruiting Don Blum on drums and Lauren Wilcox on bass, the band changed their name to The Von Bondies. The band got their break by playing a New Year's Eve show in Detroit, Michigan, in 2000. In attendance at the show was Long Gone John, owner of the Sympathy for the Record Industry label. This led the quartet to recorded the singles "It Came from Japan", an ode to Guitar Wolf, and "Nite Train".

Jack White produced the Von Bondies' debut album, Lack of Communication, which was released on July 17, 2001. It was recorded in three days in a similar process to that of a live album. The album was released in the US by Sympathy for the Record Industry, and in the UK by Sweet Nothing Records. The hidden bonus track was a cover of Sam Cooke's "Bring It On Home to Me", with Bolen on lead vocals.

=== Pawn Shoppe Heart and departure from Sire (2002–2008) ===
The group relocated to a San Francisco recording studio in early 2002 with producer Jerry Harrison of Talking Heads to begin work on their next album. The band released the live album, Raw and Rare, in 2003 through Dim Mak Records. On August 25, 2003, the Von Bondies and Sonic Youth opened for the Stooges (who had just reunited) at DTE Energy Music Theatre. On the evening of December 13, 2003, an altercation occurred between Stollsteimer and the White Stripes frontman Jack White during the record release party for the band Blanche at The Magic Stick (a Detroit music club and part of the Majestic Theater complex). Stollsteimer was treated for injuries at Detroit Receiving Hospital. Detroit police arrested White and the Wayne County prosecutor's office charged him with aggravated assault. White pleaded guilty to assault and a judge sentenced him to anger management classes.

On March 9, 2004, the band released their breakthrough album, Pawn Shoppe Heart, on Sire Records. Pawn Shoppe Heart was produced by Harrison and co-produced by Stollsteimer. The album reached a peak of No. 36 on the UK Albums Chart, and No. 8 on Billboard's Top Heatseekers chart, staying on the chart for eight weeks. The hit single from the album was "C'mon C'mon", which reached No. 25 on the Billboard Alternative Songs chart and garnered national radio play. "C'mon C'mon" reached No. 21 and "Tell Me What You See" reached No. 43 on the UK Singles Chart.

In 2006, founding member Bolen left the band. Alicia Gbur and Matt Lannoo of The Nice Device were touring members of the band from 2007 to 2008. After issues with their record label, the Von Bondies left Sire in 2008. The band then signed with Majordomo Records, joining label mates The Airborne Toxic Event and Earlimart.

=== Love, Hate and Then There's You, disbanding, and reunion plans (2009–present) ===
The Von Bondies' third album, Love, Hate and Then There's You, was released on February 3, 2009. The lineup at the time was Jason Stollsteimer on vocals and lead guitar, Don Blum on drums, Christy Hunt on rhythm guitar, and Leann Banks on bass guitar. The band released a limited-edition 7-inch single of "Pale Bride" from the album, backed with the non-album song "Falling in Love". This was the first time that a Von Bondies album saw Don Blum co-write with Stollsteimer. Love, Hate and Then There's You was produced by Jason Stollsteimer, with three songs by Butch Walker and three songs by Rick Parker. All songs were written by Jason Stollsteimer, except "Blame Game" and "Earthquake", which were co-written by Stollsteimer and Blum. The band went on tour in February 2009 in support of the album.

The Von Bondies disbanded in July 2011. They reformed in 2020 and planned a reunion tour, but those plans had to be abandoned due to the COVID-19 pandemic. The band's members have since become involved in other musical projects.

== Band members ==
Current members

- Jason Stollsteimer − lead vocals, lead guitar (1997–2011, 2020–present)
- Don Blum − drums, percussion (1999–2011, 2020–present)
- Leann Banks − bass, backing vocals (2006–2011, 2020–present)
- Christy Hunt − rhythm guitar, backing vocals (2008–2011, 2020–present)

Former members

- Marcie Bolen − rhythm guitar, backing vocals (1997–2006)
- Lauren Wilcox − bass (2000–2001)
- Carrie Ann Smith − bass, backing vocals (2001–2004)
- Yasmine Smith − bass, backing vocals (2004–2006)

Touring members

- Alicia Gbur − rhythm guitar, keyboards, backing vocals (2007–2008)
- Matt Lannoo − rhythm guitar (2007–2008)

== Discography ==
=== Studio albums ===
List of studio albums, with selected details and chart positions
Title	Album details	Peak chart positions						
Title	Album details	US	AUS	BEL (FL)	FRA	SCO	UK	UK Indie
Lack of Communication	Released: July 17, 2001; Label: Sympathy for the Record Industry	—	—	—	—	—	—	31
Pawn Shoppe Heart	Released: March 9, 2004; Label: Sire	197	58	89	176	29	36	—
Love, Hate and Then There's You	Released: February 3, 2009; Label: Majorodomo	— (Note: Love, Hate and Then There's You did not enter the Billboard 200, but peaked at number 36 on the US Heatseekers chart.)	—	—	—	—	—	—
"—" denotes a recording that did not chart or was not released in that territory.

=== EPs ===
- We Are Kamikazes (In the Act Records, 2008)

=== Singles ===
List of singles, with selected chart positions
Year	Title	Chart positions						Album
Year	Title	US Alt.	AUS	AUS Rock	SCO	UK	UK Rock	Album
"Nite Train"	2000	—	—	—	—	—	—	Lack of Communication
"It Came from Japan"	2001	—	—	—	—	132	—	Lack of Communication
"C'mon C'mon"	2004	25	85	6	33	21	8	Pawn Shoppe Heart
"Tell Me What You See"	2004	—	—	—	52	43	—	Pawn Shoppe Heart
"Pale Bride"/"Earthquake"	2008	—	—	—	—	— (Note: "Pale Bride"/"Earthquake" did not enter the UK Singles Chart, but peaked at number 54 on the UK Physical Singles Chart.)	—	Love, Hate and Then There's You
"—" denotes a recording that did not chart or was not released in that territory.

=== Compilations ===
- Sympathetic Sounds of Detroit LP/CD (Sympathy for the Record Industry, 2001, SFTRI 623)
- X-Mas Surprise Package Volume 4 7" (Flying Bomb Records, 2001, FLB-118)
- New Blood – The New Rock N Roll Vol 2 CD (Artrocker, 2002, RRR 33003)
- X-Ray CD01 (Swinstead Publishing Limited, 2002, CD01)
- Rough Trade Shops Rock and Roll 2xCD (Mute, 2002, CDStumm 212)
- The New Rock Revolution CD (NME magazine, 2002, NME CD 02-?)
- X-Mas Surprise Package (The Collector's Edition) CD (Flying Bomb Records, 2002, FLB-122)
- Dim Mak 2003 Sampler CD (Dim Mak, 2003, DM 045)
- Raw and Rare CD (Dim Mak, 2003, DM 053)
- Smash Music Sampler CD (Smash Music, 2004, smash 008)
- Sympathy for the Download 00 CD (Record Collection Music, 2004)
- House of Wax Soundtrack (Maverick Records, 2005)
- Rescue Me Soundtrack (Nettwerk Records, 2006)
- Lost Boys: The Tribe Soundtrack (Adrenaline Records, 2008)

== Videography ==
=== Music videos ===
Year	Song	Director	Ref.
2002	"It Came from Japan"	Anthony Ernest Garth	
2004	"C'mon C'mon"	Charles Jensen	
2004	"Tell Me What You See"	Charles Jensen	
2009	"Pale Bride"	Anthony Ernest Garth	

== Media usage ==
- Later... with Jools Holland (2002) – features live performances of "Lack of Communication" and "Going Down" in season 19, episode 6.
- Buffy the Vampire Slayer (2004) – features the song "It Came from Japan" in season 7, episode 6.
- 9 Songs (2004) – features a live performance of "C'mon C'mon" as one of the nine songs.
- House of Wax (2005) – features the song "Not That Social".
- In Her Shoes (2005) – features the song "No Regrets".
- "C'mon C'mon" is the opening theme used for the FX series Rescue Me.
- "C'mon C'mon" has been used in the PlayStation 2 and Xbox game Burnout 3: Takedown.
- "C'mon C'mon" has been used in the PlayStation Portable game Gretzky NHL.
- "C'mon C'mon" has been used in the MVP Baseball series of video games.
- "C'mon C'mon" is featured as a download for the console game Rock Band/Rock Band 2.
- "C'mon C'mon" has been modified to fit into the video game Tribes: Vengeance on the MTV2 television show Video Mods.
- MLB Network used a brief clip of "C'mon C'mon" as the opening of their show 30 Clubs in 30 Days from 2009 to 2012.

== See also ==
- List of alternative rock artists
