= Skyline (Yann Tiersen album) =

Studio album by Yann Tiersen
- Released: 17 October 2011 (UK and Europe)
- Recorded: Paris, Ushant, Leeds, London
- Genre: Folk rock, acoustic, indie rock
- Length: 40:12
- Label: Mute, ANTI-

Yann Tiersen chronology
Dust Lane (2010)	Skyline (2011)	∞ (Infinity) (2014)

Singles from Skyline
- 1. "Monuments" Released: 15 August 2011; 2. "I'm Gonna Live Anyhow" Released: 15 September 2011

Skyline is the seventh studio album by Yann Tiersen. The album was published by Everything's Calm and released through Mute Records on 17 October 2011 in Europe, and six months later, on 17 April 2012, via ANTI- in North America.

The album, which features nine tracks, was engineered by Gwen Roujanski, mixed by Ken Thomas, and mastered by Ray Staff. It was released in CD and LP formats.

== Recording and production ==
When Yann Tiersen recorded and released his previous album, Dust Lane, he had enough songs available for a new album. During the tour that began in October 2010, starting from New York for promoting Dust Lane, Yann Tiersen and his band have begun to unravel this new material, and the first two pieces from Skyline, "The Trial" and "Another Shore", were subsequently performed live. The album was recorded under the guidance of engineer Gwen Roujanski at Everything's Calm Studio I in Paris and largely at Studio II in Tiersen's home in Ushant. The vocals for "The Trial", engineered by Jay Pellicci, were recorded at Tiny Telephone Studios in San Francisco, while the vocals for "Vanishing Point", engineered by Efterklang, were recorded part in Berlin and part in Nashville. Skyline was subsequently mixed by music producer Ken Thomas at The Chairworks, a residential recording studio complex located in Morrison Street, Castleford, near Leeds, West Yorkshire, England, and mastered at Air Studios in London by mastering engineer Ray Staff, best known for his work with Led Zeppelin, The Rolling Stones, The Clash, Black Sabbath, and Muse.

Skyline was preceded by two singles, both released in 7" single format by Mute Records, "Monuments", released on 15 August 2011, and "I'm Gonna Live Anyhow" published in the following September. The record label also published two official music videos on its official YouTube channel: "Monuments", directed by Ivan Rusev, on 4 July 2011, and "The Gutter", filmed and directed by Claire Harbottle, and edited by Ben Baldwin, on 16 September 2011. The album, published by Everything's Calm, was released in Europe and in the United Kingdom on 17 October 2011 in CD and LP formats through Mute Records.

On 18 February 2012, Tiersen presented the album with his side project Elektronische Staubband (Tiersen, Lionel Laquerriere, and Thomas Poli) at La Route du Rock music festival in Saint-Malo. It was about an hour of krautrock, electronic, and experimental music involving a dozen of synthesizers and analog keyboards with the first three pieces of the set list taken from Dust Lane and the remaining five from Skyline. Six months after the European release of the album, on 17 April 2012, the same record label via ANTI- Records released Skyline in the United States and Canada. The American release of the album was preceded by the launch of the music videos for "The Trial" directed by Sam Wilkins and Ben Norton, and for "Another Shore", written and directed by Rusev, which were both uploaded on the record label's official YouTube channel on 24 February and 14 March 2012 respectively, and followed by the Skyline Tour 2012 that started right from North America for promoting the album.

== Artwork ==
The album cover, which depicts a field and a sky with white clouds and four vertical black bars, was designed by graphic artist Frank Loriou, who also provided the photography and the design for the eight pages photo booklet of the CD edition.

== Reception ==
Professional ratings
Aggregate scores
Source	Rating
Metacritic	76/100
Review scores
Source	Rating
AllMusic	3.5/5 stars
Blurt	85%
Drowned in Sound	8/10 stars
Filter	82%
Mojo	6/10 stars
MusicOMH	4/5 stars
PopMatters	8/10 stars

Reception for Skyline was very positive. On the review website Metacritic, the album has a score of 76 out of 100, indicating "generally favorable reviews".

Dan Lucas of UK based music webzine Drowned in Sound awarded the album eight stars on a rating scale from one to ten stars, and ended his review by saying that "Skyline is a wonderful album brought about by a sense of restlessness and curiosity: the same that saw Bowie head for Berlin, or Woody Allen to Europe in the decade just gone by." UK based popular music magazine Mojo in its review stated that "[e]xpectations are defied by a series of grand, eccentric chamber essays, and only a paucity of Tiersen's killer melodies disappoints.

Ben Weisz in his review for UK based music website MusicOMH found that "[t]he production of this album in so short a time is nothing short of miraculous, and listening to it is an experience to savour", and gave the album four stars out of five. Heather Phares of Allmusic gave the album seven stars out of ten and concluded her review by saying: "[w]hile this album and Dust Lane sacrifice some of his recognizable sound, the possibilities laid open for Tiersen are too intriguing not to pursue."

Ken Scrudato in his review of the album for Los Angeles-based magazine Filter stated that "its tracks are beautiful storms for restless times" and that "every song [is] like a journey through a forest of emotions". Steven Spoerl of the international webzine PopMatters described Skyline as "a very distinct, very engaging piece of art that holds up as it plays out and never tires. [...] It's another intensely satisfying long-player from one of the most unique and inventive forces going in contemporary creative music".

== Track listing ==
All tracks are written by Yann Tiersen

CD
No.	Title	Guest musicians	Length
1.	"Another Shore"	* Dave Collingwood – drums: Stéphane Bouvier – bass clarinet	4:54
2.	"I'm Gonna Live Anyhow"		3:48
3.	"Monuments"	* Dave Collingwood – drums	3:53
4.	"The Gutter"	* Dave Collingwood – drums: Gaëlle Kerrien – vocals	4:03
5.	"Exit 25 Block 20"	* Dave Collingwood – drums: Matt Elliott – vocals	3:28
6.	"Hesitation Wound"		4:11
7.	"Forgive Me"	* Dave Collingwood – drums	5:56
8.	"The Trial"	* Dave Collingwood – drums: Syd Matters – vocals; Lionel Laquerrière – vocals; Neil Turpin – vocals; Robin Allender – vocals; Stéphane Bouvier – vocals; Ólavur Jákupsson – vocals	5:53
9.	"Vanishing Point"	* Daniel James – vocals: Efterklang – vocals; Heather Woods – vocals; Peter Broderick – vocals	4:09
Total length:			40:12

LP

Side A
No.	Title	Length
1.	"Another Shore"	4:54
2.	"I'm Gonna Live Anyhow"	3:48
3.	"Monuments"	3:53
4.	"The Gutter"	4:03
Total length:		16:38

Side B
No.	Title	Length
1.	"Exit 25 Block 20"	3:28
2.	"Hesitation Wound"	4:11
3.	"Forgive Me"	5:56
4.	"The Trial"	5:53
5.	"Vanishing Point"	4:09
Total length:		23:37

== Personnel ==
Musicians

- Yann Tiersen – toy piano, bass guitar, guitar, synthesizer, vocals, drums, Mellotron, accordion, piano, strings, glockenspiel, vibraphone, bouzouki, mandolin, marimba
- Dave Collingwood – drums on tracks: 1, 3 to 5, 7, and 8
- Stéphane Bouvier – bass clarinet on track 1
- Gaëlle Kerrien – vocals on track 4
- Matt Elliott – vocals on track 5
- Syd Matters – vocals on track 7
- Lionel Laquerrière – vocals on track 8
- Neil Turpin – vocals on track 8
- Robin Allender – vocals on track 8
- Stéphane Bouvier – vocals on track 8
- Ólavur Jákupsson – vocals on track 8
- Daniel James – vocals on track 9
- Efterklang – vocals on track 9
- Heather Woods – vocals on track 9
- Peter Broderick – vocals on track 9

Production

- Gwen Roujanski – chief engineer
- F. Lor – drums and vocal engineer
- Jay Pellicci – vocal engineer on track 8
- Efterklang – vocal engineer on track 9
- Ray Staff – mastering
- Ken Thomas – mixing
- Frank Loriou – artwork, photography

== Charts ==
Chart (2011)	Peak position
French Albums Chart	172
