= Raw and Rare (The Von Bondies album) =

Compilation album by The Von Bondies
- Released: 2003
- Recorded: 2001–2002
- Genres: Alternative rock; garage rock
- Length: 46:36
- Label: Dim Mak

The Von Bondies chronology
Lack of Communication (2001)	Raw and Rare (2003)	Pawn Shoppe Heart (2004)

Professional ratings
Review scores
Source	Rating
Allmusic	3/5 stars
Pitchfork	7.7/10
Uncut	2/5 stars

Raw and Rare is a studio album by American band The Von Bondies released in 2003 that consists mostly of live BBC radio recordings made in 2001 and 2002.

== Track listing ==
All songs written by Jason Stollsteimer except where noted.

1. "Lack of Communication" – 3:31
2. "Nite Train" – 3:23
3. "Sound of Terror" – 3:20
4. "(Cassie) Going Down (On Marcie)" – 2:03
5. "It Came from Japan" – 2:07
6. "My Baby's Cryin'" – 2:31
7. "Cryin'" – 1:58
8. "R & R Nurse" (Yarber) – 5:13
9. "Please Please Man" – 1:59
10. "Vacant as a Ghost" – 2:18
11. "Save My Life" – 2:44
12. "Cryin'" – 1:53
13. "Take a Heart" (Sorrows, Stollsteimer) – 8:12
14. "Unknown" – 2:53
15. "It Came from Japan" – 2:32

== Personnel ==
- Jason Stollsteimer – lead vocals, lead guitar
- Marcie Bolen – rhythm guitar, backing vocals
- Carrie Ann Smith – bass guitar, backing vocals
- Don Blum – drums, percussion
