= Such Hot Blood =

Studio album by The Airborne Toxic Event
- Released: April 30, 2013
- Recorded: 2011–2013
- Genre: Indie rock, alternative rock
- Length: 41:46
- Label: Island

The Airborne Toxic Event chronology
All at Once (2011)	Such Hot Blood (2013)	Dope Machines (2015)

Such Hot Blood is the third studio album by American indie-rock band The Airborne Toxic Event. The album was released on April 30, 2013, by Island Records. The album debuted at number 27 on the Billboard 200 chart, in the first week of its release. It has sold 37,000 copies in the United States as of February 2015.

It is the last album by the band to be recorded with their full original lineup with bassist Noah Harmon, who departed from the band in 2014.

== Reception ==
Professional ratings
Aggregate scores
Source	Rating
Metacritic	64/100
Review scores
Source	Rating
AllMusic	2.5/5 stars
PopMatters	5/10 stars
Q	4/5 stars

Such Hot Blood received mixed to positive reviews from critics. On Metacritic, the album holds a score of 64/100 based on 4 reviews, indicating "generally favorable reviews".

"Such Hot Blood is at its best when it's at its most anthemic," argues Q. "But they have light touch too: Anna Bulbrook's deft viola shows they're not afraid of intricacy and in Mikel Jollett they have one of the great wounded vocalists," writes reviewer John Aizlewood, giving the album a 4 out of 5 star rating.

== Track listing ==
All tracks are written by Mikel Jollett, except where noted

No.	Title	Length
1.	"The Secret"	3:23
2.	"Timeless"	4:41
3.	"What's In a Name?"	3:50
4.	"The Storm" (Jollett, Noah Harmon)	4:02
5.	"Safe"	5:11
6.	"Bride & Groom"	3:56
7.	"True Love" (Jollett, Harmon)	3:01
8.	"This Is London"	3:56
9.	"The Fifth Day"	6:13
10.	"Elizabeth"	3:28
Total length:		41:46

== Personnel ==
- Mikel Jollett – vocals, guitar, keyboards
- Steven Chen – lead guitar, keyboards
- Anna Bulbrook – keyboards, viola, backing vocals
- Noah Harmon – bass guitar
- Daren Taylor – drums

== Charts ==
Chart (2013)	Peak position
US Billboard 200	27
US Top Alternative Albums (Billboard)	9
US Top Rock Albums (Billboard)	10
