= Dust Lane =

Studio album by Yann Tiersen
- Released: 11 October 2010
- Genre: Indie rock, experimental
- Length: 46:25
- Label: MUTE (Europe), ANTI- (USA)

Yann Tiersen chronology
Palestine EP (2010)	Dust Lane (2010)	Skyline (2011)

Dust Lane is the sixth studio album by Yann Tiersen. Tiersen himself describes the record as "not a sad thing, but a colourful thing - an experience sometimes painful, but also joyful."

The album was two years in the making and was largely recorded at Everything's Calm Studio I in Ushant with further parts recorded at Studio II in Paris and in the Philippines. It was mixed at The Chairworks in Morrison Street, Castleford, near Leeds, West Yorkshire, England, mastered at AIR Studios in London. Dust Lane, which took its title partly from the image of the dirt road going into Gaza, is permeated with the theme of mortality. During the recording sessions Tiersen lost his mother and a close friend. The recordings started out as simple song based tracks with Tiersen playing acoustic guitar, mandolin and bouzouki. New layers were added to the recordings creating a more complex sound. Then an array of vintage synthesisers and electric guitars were added to create further textures. The album was released through Mute Records in Europe and ANTI- Records in North America on 11 October 2010 in CD and LP formats. The record was promoted by a tour that started from New York City in October 2010.

== Reception ==
Professional ratings
Review scores
Source	Rating
Allmusic	3.5/5 stars
Consequence of Sound	4/5 stars
SPIN	7/10 stars

James Allen for AllMusic called the album "a rich, moody, multi-layered work that finds Tiersen showing off his instrumental prowess", noting Tiersen's diverse influences. Ryan Burleson of Consequence similarly noted the wide range of styles: "fortunately, Tiersen’s colorful education [...] doesn’t come together awkwardly or in a way that feels contrived. Rather, he’s acutely attuned to his strengths, emphasizing his classical, experimental, and pop writing capabilities at just the right moments, sometimes distinct from one another and others in tandem", while also critiquing the "talk/sing method" Tiersen employs at various points on the album, saying "the composer is at his best when he allows his music to speak for itself". David Sheppard noted in a review for BBC that while the lyrics have, "an understandably ruminative quality, much of the music is uplifting, nonetheless."

== Track listing ==
All music composed by Yann Tiersen, all lyrics written by Tiersen except "Chapter Nineteen", which lyrics are an excerpt taken from Sexus, the first part of The Rosy Crucifixion trilogy by American writer and painter Henry Miller. The LP has the same track listing of the CD with the first four tracks on its side A, and the remaining four on the side B.

No.	Title	Length
1.	"Amy"	5:01
2.	"Dust Lane"	5:10
3.	"Dark Stuff"	5:54
4.	"Palestine"	4:30
5.	"Chapter Nineteen"	5:02
6.	"Ashes"	5:17
7.	"Till The End"	7:49
8.	"Fuck Me"	7:42

== Personnel ==
Musicians

- Yann Tiersen – vocals, guitar, keyboards, toy piano, strings, bass, effects, chairs
- Matt Elliott – vocals, whistle, guitar
- Gaëlle Kerrien – vocals
- Syd Matters – vocals
- Dave Collingwood – drums

Production

- Ray Staff – mastering
- Ken Thomas – mixing
- Steve Whitfield – mixing assistant
- Gwen Roujanski – engineer
- Fabrice Laureau – engineer
- Frank Loriou – artwork, photography

== Charts ==
Chart (2010)	Peak position
Belgian Albums Chart (Vl)	96
Belgian Albums Chart (Wa)	97
French Albums Chart	36
