= Jason Stollsteimer =

American musician

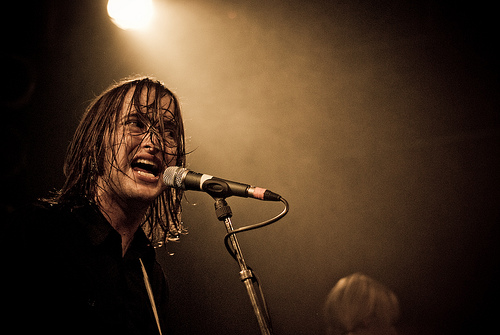
- Stollsteimer performing with the Von Bondies in 2009

Background information
- Born: April 22, 1978 (age 48); Southfield, Michigan, U.S.
- Genres: Indie rock; garage rock; alternative rock
- Occupations: Musician, songwriter
- Instruments: Vocals, guitar
- Labels: In the Act; Sire; Fierce Panda; Dim Mak; Sweet Nothing; Sympathy for the Record Industry

Jason Stollsteimer (born April 22, 1978) is an American musician, best known as the vocalist and lead guitarist for the indie rock band the Von Bondies, which took a break in 2011. Stollsteimer was also the main songwriter and a producer of the band. He released three studio albums with the Von Bondies, one studio album with The Hounds Below, and is currently playing with Ponyshow.

== Early life ==
Stollsteimer was born in Southfield, Michigan on April 22, 1978. His mother was a nurse and his father was an architect. He grew up in the Detroit suburbs of Plymouth, Michigan with his brother, Eric. As a child, he went to school at Plymouth-Canton Educational Park.

== Career ==
=== The Von Bondies ===
The Von Bondies debut album, Lack of Communication, was released in 2001 on Sympathy for the Record Industry. Jason toured the states with the first incarnation of the Von Bondies featuring longtime friend Carrie Smith on the bass, Don Blum on drums, and Marcie Bolen (Silverghost, Slumber Party) on rhythm guitar. Over ten U.S. tours were done in order to help promote the record. The group shared the stage with The Cramps, on their 8th US tour. The Von Bondies also played several shows in the U.K. and Europe and a live performance on Later... with Jools Holland in London.

In 2003, the Von Bondies released the live album Raw and Rare. The album consists mostly of live BBC recordings from the John Peel sessions. On December 13, 2003, Stollsteimer and Jack White of The White Stripes had a confrontation at the Majestic Theatre Center, in a Detroit nightclub called The Magic Stick, resulting in the hospitalization of Stollsteimer. This was the second time the two had been in a physical altercation over the unresolved issues surrounding the production credit that Jim Diamond believed he deserved on the 2001 Von Bondies album, Lack of Communication. Diamond and the rest of the Von Bondies both agreed that Diamond did most of the production work, but White denied their claims and placed his own name on the credits of the album as the sole producer, which led to the brawl. Additionally, Diamond was also suing The White Stripes at the time claiming he produced their two earliest albums, which may have added fuel to the conflict. The first attack was one year earlier, also in Detroit. White's and Stollsteimer's statements on the police report of the incident contradict each other as to who started the scuffle. In March 2004, White pleaded guilty to assault and battery, was made to pay $750 (including court costs) and to attend anger management classes.

In 2004, the Von Bondies released their second studio album, Pawn Shoppe Heart, and toured extensively in the US, UK, and Europe. "C'mon C'mon" was the first single and reached the UK Top 25 for the first time (peaking at #21), and also generated some huge buzz for the band. The other single that was released from the album, "Tell Me What You See", reached number 43 on the UK charts. Almost every track from the album has appeared in numerous commercials, movies, and TV shows. One song in particular, "C'mon C'mon", was used more than all the others combined including use in local radio commercials/adverts and as the main theme song of the hit F/X television show Rescue Me. While touring this record, the Von Bondies played the Reading and Leeds Festivals, Glastonbury Festival and Coachella Valley Music and Arts Festival

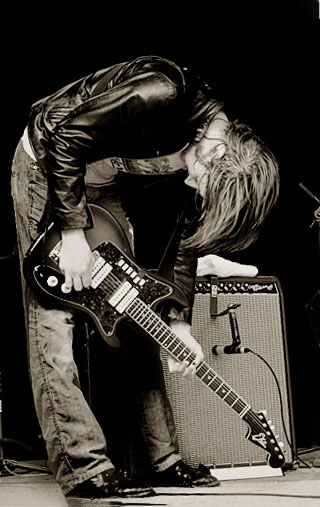
Stollsteimer performing with the Von Bondies in 2004

The Von Bondies' third album, Love, Hate and Then There's You, has gone through a long process of discovery and change before coming to its current polished form. In early 2006, a handful of demos were posted on the Von Bondies Myspace page. Later, the band posted more songs on their MySpace page including "Shut Your Mouth", "Pale Bride", and "Only to Haunt You." Don Blum played drums on these recordings with all other instruments played by Stollsteimer. Love, Hate and Then There's You was the first time Stollsteimer shared songwriting duties with anyone. The songs "This Is Our Perfect Crime" and "Accidents Will Happen" were co-written with Butch Walker, who also produced some songs on the album. The songs "Blame Game" and "Earthquake" were co-written with longtime drummer Don Blum. The album was released in 2009 on Majordomo Records.

=== The Hounds Below ===
Stollsteimer later became the frontman for The Hounds Below, which he established in 2009 and had focused on full-time following the breakup of the Von Bondies. The Hounds Below released a self-titled EP in 2011 and released their debut album, You Light Me Up In the Dark, in 2012.

=== Ponyshow ===
Stollsteimer also became the frontman for Ponyshow, which he established in 2014 with two of his former Von Bondies bandmates, Don Blum and Leann Banks. They released the songs "Folks" and "Yeah, My Ears" in 2014, along with "Zzebras" in 2017.

== Personal life ==
Stollsteimer currently resides in Metro Detroit. In addition to being a musician, he also works as a real estate agent.

== See also ==
- Garage rock revival
