= All at Once (The Airborne Toxic Event album) =

Studio album by the Airborne Toxic Event
- Released: April 26, 2011
- Genre: Alternative rock, indie rock
- Length: 43:49
- Label: Island Records
- Producer: Dave Sardy

The Airborne Toxic Event chronology
The Airborne Toxic Event (2008)	All at Once (2011)	Such Hot Blood (2013)

Professional ratings
Aggregate scores
Source	Rating
Metacritic	59/100
Review scores
Source	Rating
AllMusic	3/5 stars
Drowned in Sound	8/10
Melodic	5/5 stars
NME	3/10 stars
PopMatters	6/10 stars
Rolling Stone	2/5 stars

All at Once is the second studio album by American indie-rock band the Airborne Toxic Event. The album was released on April 26, 2011, by Island Records.

== Content ==
The band contrasted the material on the album with the material on its first album, which songwriter Mikel Jollett described as consisting entirely of "sad songs about girls." All at Once, by contrast, contains "only three sad songs about girls." The material features expanded use of keyboards and is louder in many parts, but also contains acoustic songs. All the songs were described as autobiographical except "Welcome to Your Wedding Day," which was penned in response to the Deh Bala wedding party bombing. "All those people died and then everyone was on the news like, 'I don't understand why they don't appreciate our presence,'" Jollett said. "That's not really autobiographical as much as it is about how it's stupid to think people would be thankful for you bombing them."

== Track listing ==
All tracks are written by Mikel Jollett, except where noted.

No.	Title	Length
1.	"All at Once"	5:16
2.	"Numb" (Jollett, Noah Harmon)	4:06
3.	"Changing"	3:20
4.	"All for a Woman"	3:45
5.	"It Doesn’t Mean a Thing"	2:08
6.	"The Kids are Ready to Die"	4:11
7.	"Welcome to Your Wedding Day" (Jollett, Harmon)	3:42
8.	"Half of Something Else" (Jollett, Harmon)	4:39
9.	"Strange Girl" (Jollett, Harmon)	3:24
10.	"All I Ever Wanted" (Jollett, Steven Chen)	4:18
11.	"The Graveyard Near the House"	4:55

Bonus Tracks
No.	Title	Length
12.	"This Losing" (Barnes and Noble Exclusive)	3:45
13.	"The Kids are Ready to Die (Alternate Mix)" (Deluxe Version Digital Exclusive)	4:27
14.	"Tokyo Radio" (Deluxe Version iTunes Exclusive)	2:39
15.	"Parson Redheads" (iTunes Pre-Order Only)	2:29
16.	"Haile" (Deluxe Version Amazon Exclusive)	3:41

== Personnel ==
- Mikel Jollett – vocals, guitar, keyboards
- Steven Chen – lead guitar, keyboards
- Anna Bulbrook – keyboards, viola, backing vocals
- Noah Harmon – bass
- Daren Taylor – drums

== Charts ==
Chart performance
Chart (2011)	Peak position
Canadian Albums (Nielsen SoundScan)	57
German Albums (Offizielle Top 100)	85
Scottish Albums (OCC)	49
UK Albums (OCC)	61
US Billboard 200	17
US Indie Store Album Sales (Billboard)	12
US Top Alternative Albums (Billboard)	4
US Top Rock Albums (Billboard)	5
