= Infinity (Yann Tiersen album) =

∞ (Infinity)

Studio album by Yann Tiersen
- Released: 2014
- Genre: Art rock; indie rock; dream pop
- Label: Mute

Yann Tiersen chronology
| Skyline (2011) | ∞ (Infinity) (2014) | Eusa (2016) |

∞, also known as Infinity, is an album by French musician Yann Tiersen released in 2014.

== Languages ==
Unlike previous works, Infinity has no songs written in French. Instead, they are written in English, Faroese, Icelandic, and Breton. This corresponds with an interview that Tiersen had with Port Magazine, where he expressed his appreciation for Breton culture over French culture.

== Reception ==
Infinity received some acclaim from music critics. At Metacritic, which assigns a normalized rating out of 100 to reviews from mainstream critics, the album received an average score of 74 based on 15 reviews, indicating "generally favorable reviews". The Sonic Seducer noted a similarity to Sigur Rós in the overall percussion passages, as well as post-rock influences in "Ar Maen Bihan".

== Track listing ==
1. "∞" (Infinity) – 2:58
2. "Slippery Stones" – 4:18
3. "A Midsummer Evening" – 4:13
4. "Ar Maen Bihan" – 6:53
5. "Lights" – 3:41
6. "Grønjørð" – 5:24
7. "Steinn" – 4:14
8. "In Our Minds" – 5:12
9. "The Crossing" – 5:43
10. "Meteorites" – 6:49

== Personnel ==
Musicians

- Yann Tiersen – vocals, toy instruments, acoustic and electric instruments, harmonium, strings, violin, celesta, digital and analogue manipulations, analogue synthesizers, tape effects, modular sequencing, drum programming.
- Neil Turpin – drums on all tracks except on "Steinn".
- Dave Collingwood – drums on "Steinn".
- Yvon Salou – accordion on "Grønjørð".
- Gareth Jones – modular sequencing on "Ar Maen Bihan".
- Hildur Ársælsdóttir – musical saw on "Meteorites".

Vocalists

- Maria Huld Markan Sigfúsdóttir – vocals on all tracks except on "∞" (Infinity), "Ar Maen Bihan", "Grønjørð", "In Our Minds", "The Crossing", "Meteorites".
- Edda Rún Ólafsdóttir – vocals on all tracks except on "∞" (Infinity), "Ar Maen Bihan", "Grønjørð", "Steinn", "In Our Minds", "The Crossing", "Meteorites".
- Hildur Ársælsdóttir – vocals on all tracks except on "∞" (Infinity), "Ar Maen Bihan", "Grønjørð", "Steinn", "In Our Minds", "The Crossing", "Meteorites".
- Neil Turpin – vocals on all tracks except on "∞" (Infinity), "Ar Maen Bihan", "Steinn", "Grønjørð", "In Our Minds", "The Crossing", "Meteorites".
- Stéphane Bouvier – vocals on all tracks except on "∞" (Infinity), "Ar Maen Bihan", "Grønjørð", "Steinn", "In Our Minds", "The Crossing", "Meteorites".
- Felix Classen – vocals on all tracks except on "∞" (Infinity), "Ar Maen Bihan", "Grønjørð", "Steinn", "In Our Minds", "The Crossing", "Meteorites".
- Ólavur Jákupsson – vocals on all tracks except on "∞" (Infinity), "Ar Maen Bihan", "Steinn", "In Our Minds", "The Crossing", "Meteorites".
- Lionel Laquerrière – vocals on all tracks except on "∞" (Infinity), "Ar Maen Bihan", "Grønjørð", "Steinn", "Meteorites".
- Gaëlle Kerrien – vocals on all tracks except on "∞" (Infinity), "Ar Maen Bihan", "Grønjørð", "Steinn".
- Sólrun Sumarliðadóttir – vocals on all tracks except on "∞" (Infinity), "Ar Maen Bihan", "Grønjørð", "In Our Minds", "The Crossing", "Meteorites".
- Emilie Quinquis – vocals on all tracks except on "∞" (Infinity), "Grønjørð".
- Metig Simon – vocals on "Ar Maen Bihan".
- Aidan Moffat – vocals on "Meteorites".

Additional strings played by amiina

- Maria Huld Markan Sigfúsdóttir – violin on all tracks except on "∞" (Infinity), "Lights".
- Hildur Ársælsdóttir – violin on all tracks except on "∞" (Infinity), "Lights".
- Edda Rún Ólafsdóttir – viola on all tracks except on "∞" (Infinity), "Lights".
- Sólrun Sumarliðadóttir – cello on all tracks except on "∞" (Infinity), "Lights".

Production

- Yann Tiersen – producer, engineering, art direction, design, drum recording, assistance for mixing.
- Paul Savage – Aidan Moffat vocal recording.
- Stéphane Bouvier – drum recording.
- Gareth Jones – mixing.
- Daniel Miller – assistance for mixing.
- Paul A. Taylor – art direction, design.
- Sam Wilkins – front cover image manipulation.
- Emilie Quinquis – photography.
- François Bergot – Breton language supervision.

== Charts ==
| Chart (2014) | Peak position |
|---|---|
| Belgian (Flanders) Albums Chart | 102 |
| Belgian (Wallonia) Albums Chart | 101 |
| French Albums Chart | 104 |
