= Tell Me What You See (The Von Bondies song) =

Single by The Von Bondies

from the album Pawn Shoppe Heart
- Released: 2004
- Recorded: 2003
- Genre: Garage rock; garage punk
- Length: 2:17
- Label: Sire
- Songwriter: Jason Stollsteimer
- Producers: Jerry Harrison; Jason Stollsteimer

The Von Bondies singles chronology
"C'mon C'mon" (2004)	"Tell Me What You See" (2004)	"Pale Bride" (2008)

Music video
- "Tell Me What You See" on YouTube

"Tell Me What You See" is a garage rock revival song by The Von Bondies. It was released in 2004 as the second single from their second album, Pawn Shoppe Heart.

== Reception ==
The Guardian's review jokes about deploying "the big red button on the mixing desk that reads 'Wall Of Sound'" and Jason Stollsteimer "hollering like he's been left at the bottom of a mine shaft" before concluding that the song "sounds great". In the Telegram & Gazette, the reviewer writes that the "retro-garage rocker is enough to make you shake and shimmy in your go-go cage, while swearing off the prospect of future romance all together."

== Music video ==
The music video for "Tell Me What You See" was directed by Charles Jensen and features narrative scenes along with the band performing. A young man receives a phone call and it appears that the person on the other end is yelling at him. As he is standing on the sidewalk, a car drives by and splashes slush on him. Later when he is driving, smoke begins coming out of his car so he pulls over. As he is walking down the street, someone bumps into him and continues walking as if nothing happened. He enters a store and gets strange looks from customers and employees. He grabs some pain relief medicine and leaves the store. As he is standing outside, he takes some of the pain relief medicine and is hit by a car.

== Personnel ==
- Jason Stollsteimer – lead vocals, lead guitar
- Marcie Bolen – lead vocals, rhythm guitar
- Carrie Ann Smith – bass guitar, backing vocals
- Don Blum – drums, percussion

== Chart performance ==
Chart (2004)	Peak position
UK Singles (OCC)	43
