= Lack of Communication =

Studio album by the Von Bondies
- Released: July 17, 2001
- Recorded: March 2001 at Ghetto Recorders Studio, Detroit, MI
- Genre: Alternative rock; punk blues; garage rock; indie rock
- Length: 43:31
- Label: Sympathy for the Record Industry
- Producer: Jack White

The Von Bondies chronology
| Lack of Communication (2001) | Raw and Rare (2003) |

Singles from Lack Of Communication
- 1. "Nite Train" Released: 2002; 2. "It Came from Japan" Released: 2002

Professional ratings
Review scores
| Source | Rating |
|---|---|
| AllMusic | 4/5 stars |
| NME | 7/10 |

Lack of Communication is the debut studio album by garage rock revival band the Von Bondies. It was produced by Jack White of the White Stripes, a band that also had the Von Bondies open their shows for them during one of their tours. The album was released in 2001 by Sympathy for the Record Industry, and released in the UK by Sweet Nothing Records.

In addition to conventional Detroit garage rock, the album also displayed other influences, such as the jazzy showtune-esque song "No Sugar Mama." The tracks "Shallow Grave" and "Nite Train" both display surf rock passages, amidst their heavy pummeling and lyrical morbidity. "Cass and Henry" is a sparse, almost spoken word narrative of a nocturnal encounter with a tall stranger. "In the Act" and "Sound of Terror" contain droning slide guitar and considerably slow tempos. On the last track, after a silence following the song Sound of Terror, there's a hidden bonus track: a cover of Sam Cooke's "Bring It On Home to Me", with Marcie Bolen on lead vocals.

== Track listing ==
1. "Lack of Communication" – 3:33
2. "It Came from Japan" – 2:11
3. "Shallow Grave" – 3:11
4. "Going Down" – 1:54
5. "Cass and Henry" – 5:36
6. "Nite Train" – 3:29
7. "No Sugar Mama" – 1:56
8. "Cryin'" – 2:06
9. "In the Act" – 3:03
10. "Please Please Man" – 2:04
11. "Sound of Terror" – 3:28
12. "Rock 'n' Roll Nurse" / "Bring It On Home to Me" – 10:53

== Personnel ==
- Jason Stollsteimer – lead vocals, lead guitar
- Marcie Bolen – rhythm guitar, backing vocals
- Carrie Ann Smith – bass guitar, backing vocals
- Don Blum – drums, percussion
