= Sometime Around Midnight =

Single by The Airborne Toxic Event

from the album The Airborne Toxic Event
- B-side: "Innocence" (Live); Acoustic version
- Released: February 2, 2009
- Genre: Indie rock; post-punk revival; chamber pop
- Length: 5:03 (album version); 4:30 (radio edit)
- Label: Majordomo
- Songwriter: Mikel Jollett
- Producer: Pete Min

The Airborne Toxic Event singles chronology
"Gasoline" (2008)	"Sometime Around Midnight" (2009)	"Happiness Is Overrated" (2009)

Music video
- ”Sometime Around Midnight” ver. 1 on YouTube

Music video
- ”Sometime Around Midnight” ver. 2 on YouTube

"Sometime Around Midnight" is a song by American indie rock band The Airborne Toxic Event. It was released as the second single from their self-titled debut album (2008) on February 2, 2009, in the UK. The song peaked at number 115 on the Billboard Hot 100, number 29 on the Wallonia Ultratop chart in Belgium, and number 33 on the UK Singles Chart.

== Composition ==
The song is about a night when lead singer Mikel Jollett met a former girlfriend while out at a bar, during which he discovered that he still loved her. The entire band was present during this event. The lyrics to the song were written in isolation by Jollett over the course of the next three days.

== Release ==
"Sometime Around Midnight" was iTunes' #1 alternative song of 2008. An acoustic version of this song was chosen as the Starbucks Pick of the Week for May 6.

== Music video ==
The song has two music videos, the first of which was released in August 2008, and was directed by Jason Wishnow. This video is a literal re-telling of the song's events. The second video was released on April 30, 2009, and was directed by D.J. Caruso. The newer video is a more abstract, surreal depiction of Jollett writing the song. Actress Anita Briem stars as the love interest in the video.

== Track listing ==
- Majordomo — 826663-11310 (UK CD single)

No.	Title	Length
1.	"Sometime Around Midnight"	5:03
2.	"Innocence" (KCRW Radio Performance With Calder Quartet)	8:50

== Charts ==
=== Weekly charts ===
Weekly chart performance for "Sometime Around Midnight"
Chart (2009)	Peak position
Belgium (Ultratop 50 Wallonia)	29
Scottish Singles Sales (Official Charts)	14
UK Singles (Official Charts)	33
US Bubbling Under Hot 100 (Billboard)	15
US Hot Rock & Alternative Songs (Billboard)	23

=== Year-end charts ===
Year-end chart performance for "Sometime Around Midnight"
Chart (2009)	Position
US Hot Rock Songs (Billboard)	23

== Certifications ==
Certifications for "Sometime Around Midnight"
Region	Certification	Certified units/sales
United States (RIAA)	Gold	500,000^{^}
^{^} Shipments figures based on certification alone.
