= Anna Bulbrook =

American musician

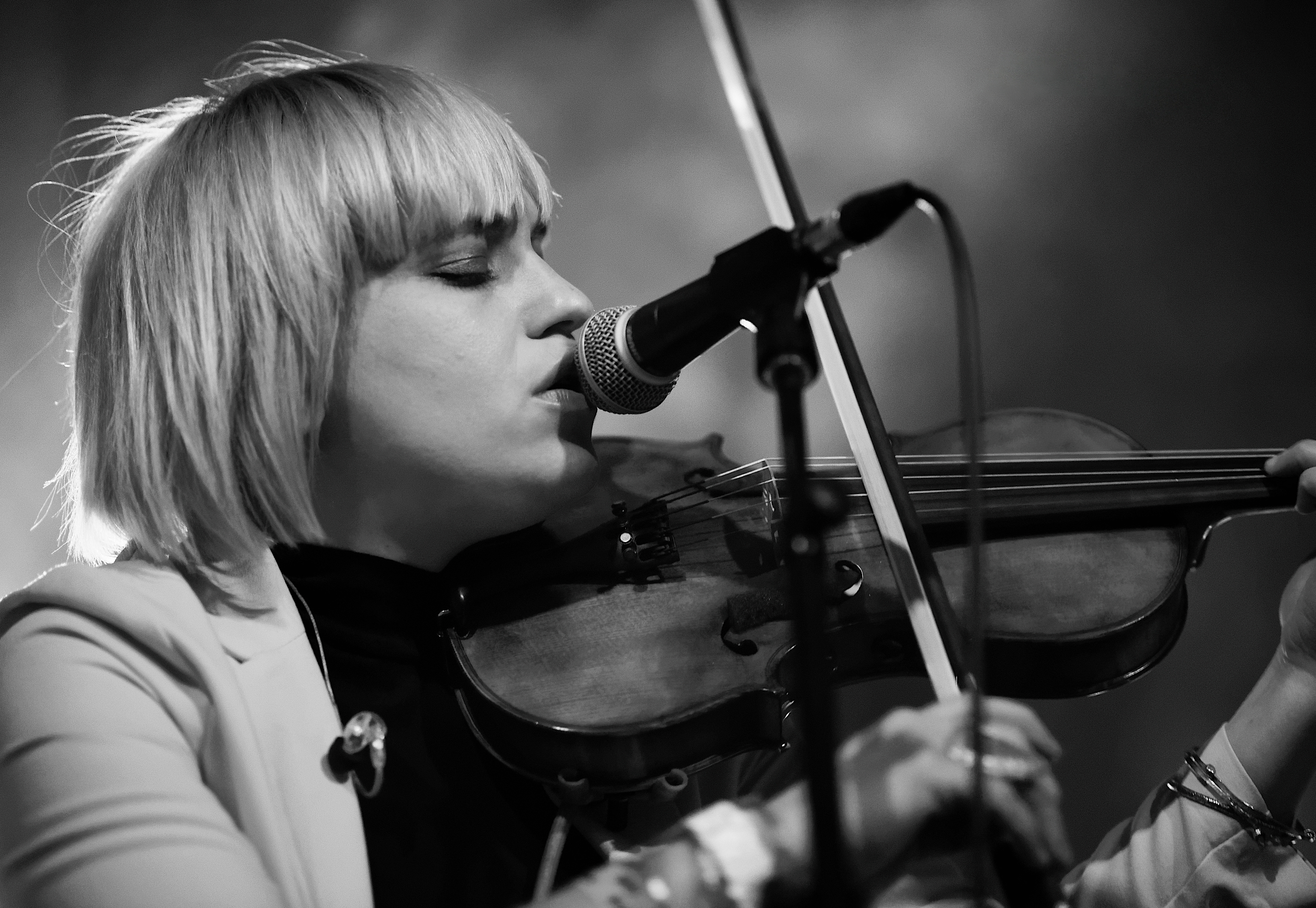
- Bulbrook performing with The Bulls

Background information
- Instruments: Violin, viola, keyboards

Anna Bulbrook is an American musician. She previously played violin and provided backing vocals for American rock band the Airborne Toxic Event.

== Early life ==
Anna Bulbrook is from Boston. She began playing violin at age four. She attended Columbia University where she majored in creative writing.

== Career ==
At age twenty-one, Bulbrook stopped playing the violin. She felt uneasy about her decision to quit, worrying that she would disappoint her family after years of lessons and providing an expensive, professional-grade violin for her. She then worked in public relations. While working as an intern at the magazine Filter, she played backing violin for a Kanye West performance in Aspen, Colorado, which she described as a "revelation", as playing in that context was more casual and fun. Mikel Jollett, who was an editor at Filter, then invited her to tour with his band The Airborne Toxic Event.

=== The Airborne Toxic Event ===
Bulbrook joined The Airborne Toxic Event in her early twenties, touring extensively after their hit "Sometime Around Midnight". In September 2019, Bulbrook announced that she was leaving the band.

=== GIRLSCHOOL ===
Bulbrook helped establish GIRLSCHOOL, a woman-led music festival that centers on women artists and leaders.

=== Other work ===
Bulbrook has been a member or touring member of other bands including Edward Sharpe and the Magnetic Zeros. She also created her own band, The Bulls, along with Marc Sallis of The Duke Spirit. Bulbrook has played violin for the scores of several films, including Moonlight. She also was credited on several tracks from the Beyoncé album Lemonade: "Pray You Catch Me", "Don't Hurt Yourself", and "All Night".
