= Pawn Shoppe Heart =

Studio album by The Von Bondies
- Released: March 9, 2004
- Recorded: 2003 Sausalito Sound, The Plant and Studio D Recording (Sausalito, CA); Ghetto Recorders Studio (Detroit, MI)
- Genres: Alternative rock; indie rock; garage rock; punk blues
- Length: 40:46
- Label: Sire
- Producers: Jerry Harrison; Jim Diamond; Jason Stollsteimer

The Von Bondies chronology
Raw and Rare (2003)	Pawn Shoppe Heart (2004)	Love, Hate and Then There's You (2009)

Singles from Pawn Shoppe Heart
- 1. "C'mon C'mon" Released: March 9, 2004; 2. "Tell Me What You See" Released: 2004

Professional ratings
Aggregate scores
Source	Rating
Metacritic	80/100
Review scores
Source	Rating
AllMusic	4/5 stars
Blender	4/5 stars
Entertainment Weekly	B−
The Guardian	4/5 stars
Los Angeles Times	3/4 stars
Pitchfork	7.9/10
Q	4/5 stars
Rolling Stone	3/5 stars
Spin	A
Uncut	4/5 stars

Pawn Shoppe Heart is the major-label debut of American garage rock revival band The Von Bondies, and their second album, released in 2004.

Pawn Shoppe Heart was produced by Jerry Harrison and co-produced by Jason Stollsteimer. The album reached a peak of No. 36 on the UK Albums Chart, and No. 8 on Billboard's Top Heatseekers chart, staying on the chart for eight weeks. The hit single from the album was "C'mon C'mon", which reached No. 25 on the Billboard Alternative Songs chart and garnered national radio play. "C'mon C'mon" reached No. 21 and "Tell Me What You See" reached No. 43 on the UK Singles Chart.

The record was met with critical acclaim, and helped lend even further voice to the Detroit garage punk underground brought to mainstream success by The White Stripes two years prior. The record has an average score of 80/100 on Metacritic. On the last track, after the three-minute silence following "Pawn Shoppe Heart", there's a hidden track: a cover of "Try a Little Tenderness", a song made popular by Otis Redding.

A shortened version of "C'mon C'mon" was the theme song for the American comedy-drama television show, Rescue Me. It is featured on the video games Burnout 3: Takedown and MVP Baseball 2004. The track "Mairead" is about Queens of Noize DJ Mairead Nash, who has been associated with Jason Stollsteimer. MLB Network uses a brief clip of "C'mon C'mon" as the opening of their show 30 Clubs in 30 Days. "C'mon C'mon" was also released as downloadable content for Rock Band and Rock Band 2 on March 31, 2009 for Xbox 360 and April 2, 2009 for PS3. This track became available as DLC for the Wii version of Rock Band 2 on April 7, 2009.

== Track listing ==
All songs written by Jason Stollsteimer except where noted.

1. "No Regrets" – 2:34
2. "Broken Man" – 2:10
3. "C'mon C'mon" – 2:15
4. "Tell Me What You See" – 1:56
5. "Been Swank" – 2:44
6. "Mairead" – 5:11
7. "Not That Social" – 3:01
8. "Crawl Through the Darkness" – 2:45
9. "The Fever" (Jason Stollsteimer, Don Blum) – 2:38
10. "Right of Way" – 3:46
11. "Poison Ivy" – 2:14
12. "Pawn Shoppe Heart" / "Try a Little Tenderness" (Stollsteimer, Irving King, Harry M. Woods) – 9:28

== Personnel ==
- Jason Stollsteimer – lead vocals, lead guitar, backing vocals on "Not That Social"
- Marcie Bolen – rhythm guitar, backing vocals, lead vocals on "Not That Social"
- Carrie Ann Smith – bass guitar, backing vocals
- Don Blum – drums, percussion

== Charts ==
Chart performance for Pawn Shoppe Heart
Chart (2004)	Peak position
Australian Albums (ARIA)	58
Belgian Albums (Ultratop Flanders)	89
French Albums (SNEP)	176
UK Albums (Official Charts)	36
US Billboard 200	197
