= C'mon C'mon (The Von Bondies song) =

Single by The Von Bondies

from the album Pawn Shoppe Heart
- Released: March 9, 2004
- Recorded: 2003
- Genre: Garage rock; garage punk
- Length: 2:15
- Label: Sire
- Songwriter: Jason Stollsteimer
- Producer: Jerry Harrison/Jason Stollsteimer

The Von Bondies singles chronology
"It Came from Japan" (2003)	"C'mon C'mon" (2004)	""Tell Me What You See"" (2004)

Music video
- "C'mon C'mon" on YouTube

"C'mon C'mon" is a garage rock revival song by The Von Bondies, released in 2004 on the album Pawn Shoppe Heart. The song is the Von Bondies' highest-charting single.

== Music video ==
The music video for "C'mon C'mon" was directed by Charles Jensen.

== Use in popular media ==
A shortened version of the song is the theme song for the American comedy-drama television show, Rescue Me.

The song was one of the titular "nine songs" in the controversial film 9 Songs, which featured a live performance of the song by the band.

It is featured on the EA video games Burnout 3: Takedown, MVP Baseball 2004, Gretzky NHL, MTV's The Ashlee Simpson Show and as a downloadable song on Rock Band 2.

In 2019, the song was used in an advertisement for the Mercedes-Benz CLA Coupé.

== Personnel ==
- Jason Stollsteimer – lead vocals, lead guitar
- Marcie Bolen – rhythm guitar
- Carrie Ann Smith – bass guitar
- Don Blum – drums, percussion

== Chart performance ==
Chart (2004)	Peak position
Australia (ARIA)	85
UK Singles (OCC)	21
US Alternative Airplay (Billboard)	25
