= Songs of God and Whiskey =

Studio album by The Airborne Toxic Event
- Released: February 24, 2015
- Recorded: 2014
- Genre: Alternative rock, indie rock
- Length: 32:53
- Label: Epic Records

The Airborne Toxic Event chronology
Dope Machines (2015)	Songs of God and Whiskey (2015)	Hollywood Park (2020)

Songs of God and Whiskey is the fifth studio album by American indie-rock band The Airborne Toxic Event. On February 23, 2015, a day before the release of Dope Machines, the band announced via their Facebook page that they'd be releasing a second album the next day. The second album would be acoustic and focus more on rock and roll than the electronic synth pop in Dope Machines. The album would be composed of songs written throughout the ten years before the album's release. Songs of God and Whiskey was released on February 24, 2015.

== Track listing ==
No.	Title	Length
1.	"Poor Isaac"	3:11
2.	"Cocaine And Abel"	3:17
3.	"A Certain Type of Girl"	2:57
4.	"Change And Change And Change And Change"	2:46
5.	"April Is The Cruelest Month"	2:30
6.	"The Lines Of The Cars"	3:29
7.	"Strangers"	3:36
8.	"Why Why Why"	3:57
9.	"California"	3:29
10.	"The Fall Of Rome"	3:40
Total length:		32:53
