= Hollywood Park (album) =

Studio album by The Airborne Toxic Event
- Released: May 22, 2020
- Recorded: 2020
- Genres: Alternative rock, indie rock
- Length: 53:26

The Airborne Toxic Event chronology
Songs of God and Whiskey (2015)	Hollywood Park (2020)	Glory (2024)

Hollywood Park is the sixth studio album by American indie-rock band The Airborne Toxic Event. Released in 2020, the album follows the thematic arc of Mikel Jollett's memoir of the same name. Both the album and memoir mirror Jolett’s traumatic early life.

== Track listing ==
No.	Title	Length
1.	"Hollywood Park"	6:32
2.	"Brother, How Was The War?"	4:51
3.	"Carry Me"	4:13
4.	"Come On Out"	4:38
5.	"I Don't Want to Be Here Anymore"	4:34
6.	"All the Children"	4:59
7.	"Everything I Love Is Broken"	3:50
8.	"All These Engagements"	4:40
9.	"The Place we Meet a Thousand Feet Beneath the Racetrack"	3:00
10.	"The Common Touch"	5:07
11.	"The Place We Meet a Thousand Feet Beneath the Racetrack (Reprise)"	2:21
12.	"True."	4:46
Total length:		53:26
