= Exit Clov =

US musical group

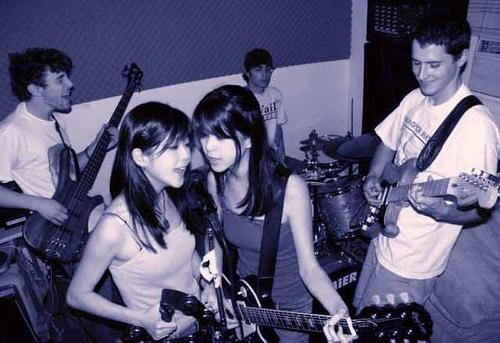

Background information
- Origin: Washington, DC, United States
- Genres: Indie pop, indie rock, new wave
- Years active: 2003 – present
- Members: Emily Hsu; Susan Hsu; John Thayer; Brett Niederman; Aaron Leeder

Exit Clov is a five-piece indie rock band from Washington, DC, whose sound is often described as “kaleidoscopic pop noir". The group features twin sisters Emily Hsu (vocals, keyboard, violin) and Susan Hsu (vocals, guitar, violin) along with Aaron Leeder (guitar), Brett Niederman (bass), and John Thayer (drums). The name of the group is derived from Samuel Beckett's Endgame, although they admit that it was the only work of Beckett's that they had read at the time they selected the name.

Since forming in 2003 they have put out several EP's including their first two, which were self-released. In 2006 Jolly Roget Sessions was created with the help of producer Roger Greenawalt (No Doubt, Ben Kweller, Iggy Pop and Ric Ocasek).

== Live performances ==
Since their formation, Exit Clov has performed with a number of bands and artists, most notably Dr. Dog, Kanye West, Architecture in Helsinki, Animal Liberation Orchestra, Jukebox The Ghost, Cloud Cult, Razorlight and Tea Leaf Green.

The band has toured the United States playing such festivals as South by Southwest (SXSW) and the All Good Music Festival. Today they continue to tour the US, commonly performing in northeastern venues like the 9:30 Club in Washington, Bowery Ballroom in New York City, Middle East in Boston and their unofficial home stage in DC, The Black Cat.

== Discography ==
- Jailbird (2013)
- Memento Mori (2010)
- Respond Respond (2006) EP
- Jolly Roget Sessions (2006) EP
- Up All Night: Jammin' to the Talking Heads (2005) Compilation - This Must Be the Place (Naive Melody)
- Saskwatch (2004) EP
- Starfish (2003) EP
