= Dope Machines =

Studio album by The Airborne Toxic Event
- Released: February 20, 2015
- Recorded: 2014
- Genre: Synth-pop, Electronic rock, indie rock
- Length: 43:27
- Label: Epic Records

The Airborne Toxic Event chronology
Such Hot Blood (2013)	Dope Machines (2015)	Songs of God and Whiskey (2015)

Professional ratings
Review scores
Source	Rating
AllMusic	3.5/5 stars
Sputnikmusic	2.5/5

Dope Machines is the fourth studio album by American indie-rock band The Airborne Toxic Event. The album was released on February 20, 2015, by Epic Records. It is the first studio album by the band to feature bassist Adrian Rodriguez who replaced their original bassist Noah Harmon since he was being fired from the group in August 2014, as well as the last official studio album with their violinist Anna Bulbrook before she announced her departure from the group in September 2019.

== Track listing ==
No.	Title	Length
1.	"Wrong"	4:15
2.	"One Time Thing"	4:02
3.	"Dope Machines"	3:17
4.	"California"	3:51
5.	"Time to be a Man"	4:10
6.	"Hell and Back"	3:53
7.	"My Childish Bride"	4:25
8.	"The Thing About Dreams"	5:33
9.	"Something You Lost"	5:06
10.	"Chains"	4:55
Total length:		43:27

== Charts ==
Chart (2015)	Peak position
US Billboard 200	56
US Top Alternative Albums (Billboard)	8
US Top Rock Albums (Billboard)	14
