= Ponyshow =

American rock band

- Origin: Detroit, Michigan, United States
- Genres: Indie rock; alternative rock
- Years active: 2014–present
- Labels: Yeah Right!; In the Act
- Spinoff of: The Von Bondies
- Members: Jason Stollsteimer; Leann Banks; Don Blum

Ponyshow (stylized as PONYSHOW) is an American rock band formed in Detroit, Michigan in 2014 by Jason Stollsteimer (lead vocals, guitar), Leann Banks (lead vocals, bass), and Don Blum (drums).

The band consists of members of The Von Bondies, who went on hiatus in 2011. Ponyshow released the songs "Folks" and "Yeah, My Ears" in October 2014. The band released a music video for "Folks" in November 2014. Ponyshow went on tour in 2015, including shows with Sebadoh and at Fuzz Fest in Ann Arbor, Michigan. The band released the song "Zzebras" in January 2017.

== Band members ==
Current members

- Jason Stollsteimer − lead vocals, guitar (2014–present)
- Leann Banks − lead vocals, bass (2014–present)
- Don Blum − drums (2014–present)

== Discography ==
=== Singles ===
- "Folks" (2014)
- "Yeah, My Ears" (2014)
- "Zzebras" (2017)

== See also ==
- List of indie rock musicians
