= Mikel Jollett =

American musician and author (born 1974)

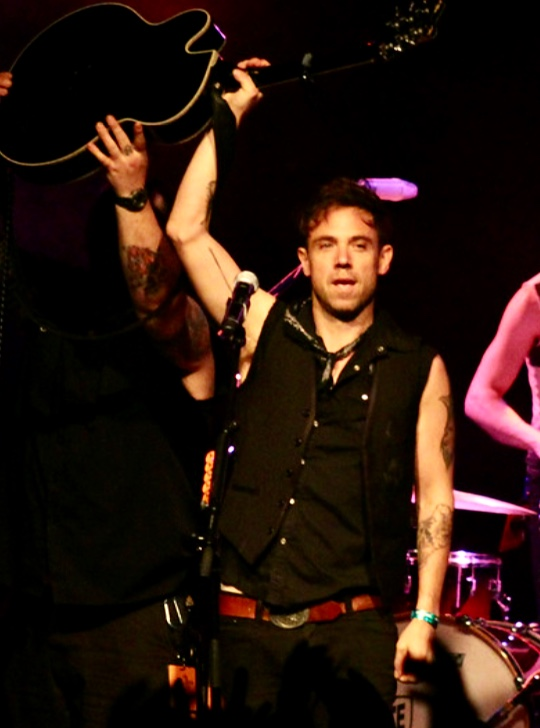
- Jollett performing with The Airborne Toxic Event

Background information
- Born: Mikel Frans Jollett; May 21, 1974 (age 52); Santa Monica, California, U.S.
- Genres: Indie rock
- Occupations: Musician; singer; songwriter; author
- Instruments: Vocals; guitar; keyboard
- Years active: 2006-present
- Labels: Majordomo; Island; Epic; Rounder

Mikel Frans Jollett (born May 21, 1974) is an American musician and author. He is best known as the frontman for American indie rock band the Airborne Toxic Event as well as the author of the New York Times bestselling memoir Hollywood Park (2020).

== Early life ==
Jollett was born in Santa Monica in the experimental commune society called Synanon. Until he was five, he and his older brother were raised apart from their parents in Synanon schools. Jollett's father had been incarcerated in Chino State Prison from 1963 to 1966 prior to joining Synanon where he overcame a heroin addiction. Jollett's mother was a social worker with a master's degree from the University of California, Berkeley, who met Jollett's father in Synanon. When the commune became violent, his mother took him and his brother to live in Oakland and then in Oregon.

Jollett eventually moved to live with his father and stepmother in Los Angeles, where he attended Westchester High School, graduating with a 4.3 GPA. During high school, Jollett participated in California YMCA Youth & Government's Model Legislature & Court program and served as the Speaker of the Assembly in 1992. He later attended Stanford University, graduating with honors in 1996. While at Stanford, Jollett was a member of Claude Steele's lab group in which he conducted research on the concept of stereotype threat. Jollett's work focused on how harmful racial stereotypes negatively affected the identity and test performance of high school students.

== Writing ==
In the summer of 2008, McSweeney's issue 27 published Jollett's short story, "The Crack", which appeared between short stories by Liz Mandrell and Stephen King. He was a frequent contributor to All Things Considered on NPR and the Los Angeles Times, an editor at large for Men's Health, and the managing editor of Filter magazine. Jollett was accepted to Yaddo Writer's Colony in 2005 to complete his novel based on "The Crack", but did not attend, choosing to pursue music instead.

Jollett's memoir Hollywood Park was published on May 26, 2020. It debuted its first week at #8 on The New York Times Best Seller list.

== Music career ==
Jollett began seriously writing songs following a week in March 2006, during which he underwent a break-up and learned his mother had been diagnosed with cancer. This quick succession of events spurred a period of intense songwriting featured on his band's first album.

In keeping with his literary background, Jollett named the band after a section of Don DeLillo's postmodern novel White Noise, which won the National Book Award in 1985. In the book, a chemical spill from a railcar releases a poisonous cloud, dubbed by the military and media as an "airborne toxic event." Jollett chose to name the band after the event in the novel which triggers the fear of death that fundamentally alters the protagonist's outlook on himself, his family, and his life. The band was born of a similar life-altering sequence of events, and thus, the themes of mortality and media consumption that arise from the novel's toxic cloud serve as a major impetus for Jollett's creative drive.

The Airborne Toxic Event's debut album received favorable reviews from such outlets as the Los Angeles Times, Newsweek, Q, and Entertainment Weekly. Notably, the Boston Herald named the band's album "The Debut Album of the Year." In addition, iTunes named "Sometime Around Midnight" the No. 1 Alternative Song of the Year on their Best of list. The song went on to become a certified gold single. The band has been signed to Island Records and Epic Records. They have developed a loyal live fan base with performances at many festivals including Coachella and Lollapalooza while headlining shows at the Greek Theatre, Central Park's Summer Stage and Red Rocks with the Colorado Symphony.

== Personal life ==
Jollett's father died in 2015. He and his wife Lizette have a son and a daughter and live in the Silver Lake neighborhood of Los Angeles.
