= Russian Winters =

- Origin: Perth, Western Australia
- Genres: Indie Rock
- Years active: 2006 – present
- Label: Independent
- Members: Kris Dimitroff; Rob Stephens; Trent Dhue; John Clark; Pete Evans
- Past members: Sam Sterrett; Ben Crooke; Matty G Peter Illari
- Website: Official Website

Russian Winters are an indie rock band from Perth, Western Australia. Their debut album Last Battles was released on 23 September 2011.

== History ==
Russian Winters formed in 2006 as a two-piece with Kris Dimitroff on vocal/guitar and Matty G on bass and guitar. Both had been members of Perth indie-pop band, Team Jedi (1996–2004). Russian Winters' line-up expanded in early 2006 to include Pete Illari on drums and Sam Sterrett on lead guitar.

Ben Crooke took the drum stool in 2007 and Rob Stephens joined on bass in 2008.

The band's first single, "Another Chance" was released in March 2008. It won Pop Song of the Year on Western Oz FM. In 2009, the band was invited to Kuala Lumpur, Malaysia to play the Sunburst Festival. They shared the stage with international acts including N*E*R*D and Korn.

In October 2009, the band expanded to a 5-piece, adding Trent Dhue on keyboards and trumpet.

In 2010, the band took 10 months off to write for their debut album, Last Battles. During the writing process, the band shifted their sound away from polished pop to a more aggressive and varied sound. The departure of guitarist Sam Sterrett in September 2010 and Ben Crooke in February 2011, left the remaining 3 members, (Kris Dimitroff, Rob Stephens and Trent Dhue) to complete the album and play all the instruments.

Citing bands like The Cure, Ride, The National, Foals, Silversun Pickups, Fleet Foxes and Sparklehorse as influences, the band strove for a darker and more complex sound than previous work.

Lyrically, the band found inspiration for some songs in Paul Verhoeven films ("Verhoeven"), Robert Frost poems ("Good Fences") and the first use of the electric chair ("Execution by Electrocution").

In June 2011, John Clark (Trumpet and Keyboards) and Pete Evans (drums) joined the band and the first single, "Pacific" was released. Immediately it was played on Triple J and subsequently progressed to rotation. Russian Winters were chosen by Triple J Unearthed to play the Parklife Festival in Perth on 26 September 2011, 3 days after the official release of Last Battles.

== Discography ==
=== Albums/EPs ===
- Give up the Ghost (EP - 6 September 2008)
- Last Battles - (LP - 23 September 2011)

=== Singles ===
- "Another Chance" (8 March 2008)
- "She Knows" (22 March 2010)
- "Pacific" (13 June 2011)
