= Filter (magazine) =

US music magazine, 2002–2014

- The Strokes and Lou Reed on the cover of the Winter 2004 issue of Filter
- Editor: Pat McGuire
- Categories: Music magazine
- Frequency: Five per year
- Founded: July 2002
- Final issue: June 2014
- Country: United States
- Based in: Los Angeles
- Language: English
- Website: filtermagazine.com
- ISSN: 1544-2861

Filter (stylized as FILTER), an entertainment magazine on American music, was founded in July 2002. In 2014, Miller and Sartirana parted ways; however, Sartirana, McGuire, and Simonian joined with several members of the Filter staff to found Flood Magazine, a quarterly entertainment publication.
