= Majordomo Records =

American record label

Majordomo Records is an indie record label formed as an imprint of Shout! Factory, a Los Angeles-based audio/video label started by the founders of Rhino Records. The label's products are distributed through Sony BMG in the United States, Universal Music in Canada and Pinnacle in Europe. The imprint specializes in indie rock, alternative and punk music.

== Artists signed with Majordomo Records ==
List includes artists previously signed with the label:

- Chappo
- Earlimart
- The Von Bondies
- Miles Kurosky
- The Airborne Toxic Event
