= Christine Ott =

French musician (born 1963)

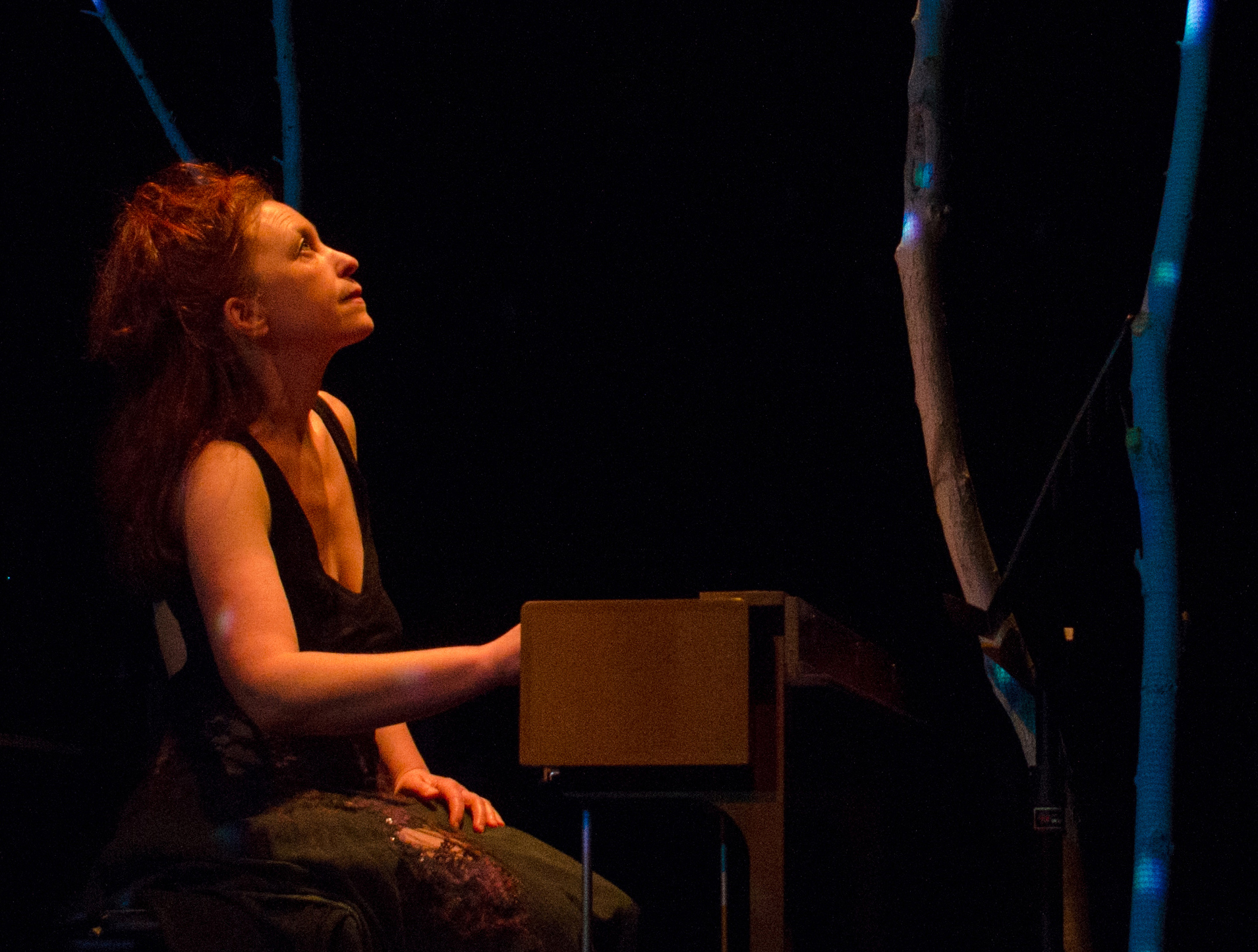
- Ott in 2013

Background information
- Born: 10 August 1963 (age 63); Strasbourg, France
- Genres: Classical crossover; avant-garde; experimental; free improvisation; art music; contemporary classical
- Occupations: Musician; composer
- Instruments: Ondes Martenot; piano; keyboards; vocals
- Years active: 1995–present
- Labels: Gizeh Records; Nahal Recordings
- Member of: Snowdrops
- Website: christineott.fr

Christine Ott (born 10 August 1963) is a French pianist, vocalist, ondist, and composer.

She was a member of Yann Tiersen's band for eight years and played in classical orchestras for ten. She has collaborated with Tindersticks, Syd Matters, and Jean-Philippe Goude.

Ott has released four solo albums: Solitude Nomade in 2009, Only Silence Remains in 2016, Chimères (pour Ondes Martenot) in 2020 and Time to Die in 2021. She also composed the soundtrack for F. W. Murnau's Tabu in 2016. She has created several live soundtracks shows, including for Lotte Reiniger's movies and Robert J. Flaherty's Nanook of the North.

Ott formed the duo Snowdrops with Mathieu Gabry in 2015. Together, they composed the original score for Manta Ray, by Phuttiphong Aroonpheng, and in 2020, they released the album Volutes, on Injazero Records. The Guardian selected the release among its ten best contemporary discs of 2020, writing, "what's remarkable is how radically different Christine Ott manages to make the ondes sound on each track: from a primeval, guttural sound on the 13-minute Odysseus to a chirruping boy soprano on Ultraviolet."

== Discography ==
=== Solo ===
- Solitude Nomade (2009)
- Only Silence Remains (2016)
- Tabu (2016)
- Nanook of the North with Torsten Böttcher (2019)
- Chimères (pour Ondes Martenot) (2020)
- Time to Die (2021)
- Éclats (Piano Works) (2023)
- The Lotus Path with Manuel Hermia (EP, 2024)

=== Snowdrops ===
- Volutes (2020)
- Inner Fires (2021)
- Missing Island (2022)
- Singing Stones (Volume 1) (2024)

=== As guest or session musician ===
- Electric Dream Fantasy by Roger Tessier (1994)
- Tout sera comme avant by Dominique A (2004)
- Contre le centre by Mobiil (2004)
- Le point de coté by Dominique Petitgand (2005)
- Plays the Residents by Narcophony (2005)
- Fragile by Têtes Raides (2005)
- Aux solitudes by Jean-Philippe Goude (2008)
- Ghost Days by Syd Matters (2008)
- A l'attaque by Loïc Lantoine (2008)
- Ersatz by Julien Doré (2008)
- The dark age of love by This Immortal Coil (2009)
- 613 by Chapelier Fou (2011)
- Tels Alain Bashung, Aucun express (Noir Désir) (2011)
- Everything was story by Raphelson (2011)
- Ghost Surfer by Cascadeur (2013)
- Unworks & Rarities by Oiseaux-Tempête (2016)
- Earth by Foudre! (side-project of Mondkopf, Saåad & Frédéric D. Oberland) (2017)
- Chopin Residue by Mariusz Szypura (2025)

with Yann Tiersen

- L'Absente (2001)
- Le fabuleux destin d'Amélie Poulain by Jean-Pierre Jeunet (2001)
- C'était ici (2002)
- Les retrouvailles (2005)
- On Tour (2006)
- Tabarly / Pierre Marcel (2008)

== Soundtracks ==
=== Personal works ===
- La fin du silence by Roland Edzard (2011)
- Minute Bodies by Stuart Staples, Thomas Belhom, and Christine Ott (2016)
- Manta Ray by Phuttiphong Aroonpheng, with Snowdrops (2018)
- Morrison by Phuttiphong Aroonpheng, with Snowdrops (2022)
- The Burning Giants by Phuttiphong Aroonpheng, with Snowdrops (2026)

=== Collaborations ===
- Swing / Tony Gatlif (2011)
- 35 rhums / Claire Denis by Tindersticks (2008)
- Les Salauds by Tindersticks (2010)
- Claire Denis Film Scores by Tindersticks (2011)
- Ou va la nuit / Martin Provost by Hughes Tabar-Noval (2011)

== Ciné-concerts and performances ==
- Tabu (2012)
- Nanook of the North (2013)
- 24h of a Woman's Life with Michel Druez (2013)
- Stories & Légends by Lotte Reiniger; "Lotte, mon amour" (2014)
- Iranian Tales (with Snowdrops) (2016)
- Aran (with Snowdrops) (2025)

== Classical music ==
- "Les trois petites liturgies de la présence divine" (1995)
- "Les Adieux" by Marcel Landowski (1997)
- "Il Mantello", opéra by Luciano Chailly (1998)
- "Ecuatorial" by Edgard Varèse (1999)
- "Les Innatendus III" (Ed Mickaël, Nocturne; André Jolivet, Suite Delphique; Arthur Honegger, Symphonie n°2 pour orchestre à cordes) (2013)

== Videography ==
- Live with Radiohead (2005)
- On Tour, Yann Tiersen (2006)
- Carte blanche to Christine Ott, Neuilly Theater (2010)
