= A Time to Die =

A time to die is a phrase from Chapter 3 of the Book of Ecclesiastes in the Bible.

A Time to Die or Time to Die may also refer to:

== Film and television ==
- A Time to Die (1982 film), by Matt Cimber
- Time to Die (1985 film), a 1985 Colombian film
- A Time to Die, a 1991 film starring Traci Lords
- Pora umierać (Time to Die), a 2007 film by Dorota Kędzierzawska
- "A Time to Die", an episode of Tales of the Unexpected

== Literature ==
- A Time to Die: The Attica Prison Revolt, a 1975 book by Tom Wicker
- A Time to Die (Smith novel), a 1989 novel by Wilbur Smith
- A Time to Die, a 2002 account of the 2000 Kursk submarine disaster by Robert Moore
- A Time to Die (Star Trek), a 2004 Star Trek: The Next Generation novel by John Vornholt
- A Time to Die, a 2016 novel by Tom Wood

== Music ==
- Time to Die (The Dodos album), 2009
- Time to Die (Electric Wizard album), 2014
- Time to Die (Christine Ott album), 2021
- "Time to Die", a song by Gary Numan from Strange Charm, 1986
- "Time to Die", a song by Dungeon from Demolition, 1996

== Video games ==
- Time to Die, another name for the 1985 computer game Borrowed Time

== See also ==
- Tiempo de morir, a 1965 Mexican drama film
- The Time to Die, a 1970 French crime film
- No Time to Die (disambiguation)
