= Caroline Martel =

Canadian documentary filmmaker

Caroline Martel (born 1973) is a French Canadian documentary filmmaker from Montreal, Canada. She holds a role as a Research Collaborator for Cinema Expo67 researching the history of Expo67. Her work has been displayed in museums, such as the Museum of Moving Image. Her installation “Industry/Cinema” was displayed here. Her debut film was Hold the Line (2001). Her documentaries focus on underrepresented topics or people. Martel uses the phrase "Unseen Voice" to describe this choice of subject matter.

== Education ==
Martel received a BA in Communications and an MA in Media Studies both received from Concordia University. She is currently completing a PhD in Communications Studies.

== Work ==
Hold the Line (2001) was directed by Martel's film debut, produced by the National Film Board of Canada.

The Phantom of the Operator (2004) is a documentary directed by Martel. It won the award for Best Experimental Film at the Brooklyn Underground Film Festival. It shows the role of female telephone operators from years ago. It highlights the necessity and expectation for the operator to greet customers with a friendly and welcoming voice. The film's topic has not garnered widespread attention, the history of the telephone was more documented than those who operated the lines. Martel states this as a reason for her creation of the film, referring to these the operator as the "Unseen Voice". All of Martel's films focus on this idea. The film also explores how these operators were phased out, specifically by computerization. The film is narrated by Pascale Montpetit in a spectral tone, aiming to act as a voice for these operators. Martel created this film using archival footage from old industrial films, no original video material was used.

Wavemakers (2012) is about a unique musical instrument called the Ondes Martenot. It won the award for Music & Film at the Athens International Film Festival. The documentary directed by Martel explores the history of the instrument and its creator Maurice Martenot. It also retells the story of musicians who use the Ondes Martenot. The soundtrack was performed by Suzanne Binet-Audet on the Ondes Martenot. This is another one of Martel's documentaries to feature archival footage.

== Awards ==
- Best Experimental Film, Brooklyn Underground Film Festival (Phantom of the Operator)
- Music & Film, Athens International Film Festival (Wavemakers)
