= Aires Libres =

Music festival in Marseille, France

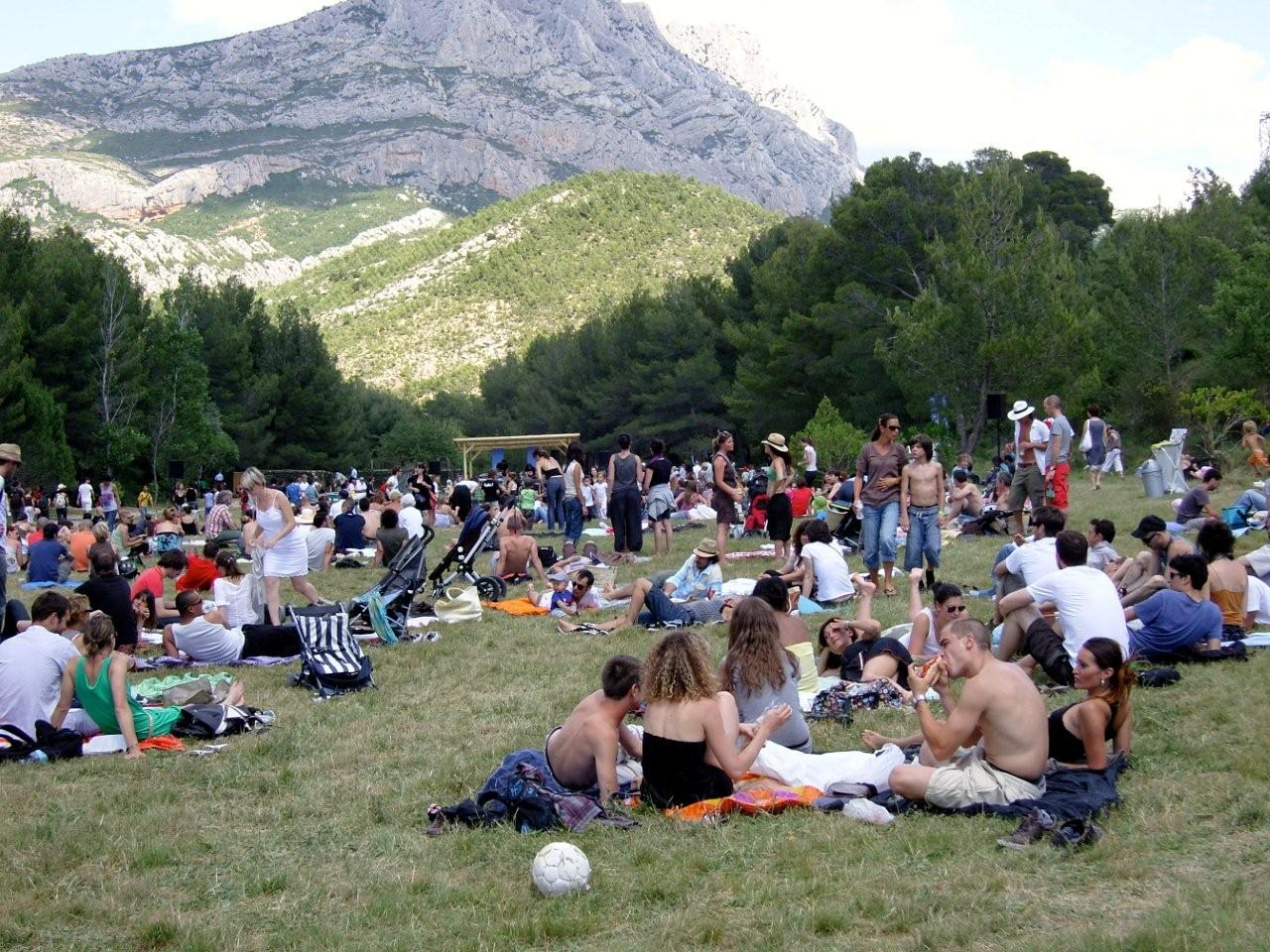
- Genre: Electronic music,
- Location: Marseille (France)
- Years active: 2005-present
- Founders: A L'unisson
- Website: Official website

Aires Libres is a free, multidisciplinary music festival created in 2005 in Marseille (France) by the French collective "A L'unisson". Inspired from Les Siestes Electroniques, "Sous la Plage" and" Pelouses électroniques", three events created in Toulouse and Paris two years ago. Aires Libres’s main goal is to showcase electronic music outdoor, and promote various cultural activities for children and their families through visual art and several artistic workshops. Access is free and most Aires Libres events take place in the Summer touring various places with a significant historical heritage in the French department of Provence.

== Concept ==
Aires Libres recreates an attractive spacetime continuum to listen to music in sheer nature with family and friends.

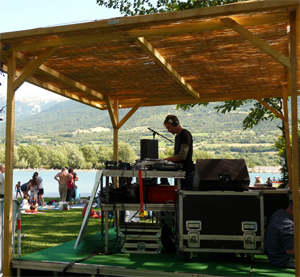
Festival de musique "Aire libre" à Embrun

Aires Libres events pursue the following goals:

- To introduce innovating musical and visual art forms
- To introduce artistic activities to both children and their families
- To preserve social linkage and nature proximity through the discovery of exceptional sights situated near large cities
- To Increase public awareness concerning ecological issues and sustainable development in a natural environment

Beyond its music programming, Aires Libres’ originality lies in two different perspectives:

- Prioritizing the tastes and interests of children and their families.
- An ecological dimension integrating sustainable development with actions such as waste management, recycling, collective transport, composting toilets, reduction of carbon footprint and an increasing public awareness of their local environment in prestigious natural sights exploited on exceptional occasions (Mont Sainte-Victoire, Mountain of Sainte-Baume, Camargue, all part of an historical heritage).

== History ==
- 2005: First Aire Libre at Parc Borély in Marseille (3rd 4 th sept.)
- 2006: Second edition scheduled over two days at Parc Borély (10, 11 June), but cancelled in September due to town hall.
- 2006 By invitation @ Nuits Sonores festival Lyon.
- 2007: Aire Libre is held out of the city for the first time at l'Etang des Aulnes (Saint-Martin-de-Crau -13)- a massive lawn nearby a pond in les Domaines Départementaux with the collaboration of Conseil général des Bouches-du-Rhône. Format being reduced to a day period (12h-20h). Invitation at Sous la Plage festival- Paris.
- 2008: First touring season in Provence, with two major dates right before summer Mont Sainte-Victoire-Domaine de Roques-Hautes (Le Tholonet) early June, St Pons forest in Gémenos Sainte-Baume-mountain, in September.
- First Appels d'Aires sessions then followed by an invitation at Les Siestes Electroniques in Toulouse.
- 2009: 5th year and second touring season, the festival is now maturing and solidifying. Aires Libres gets back to two prestigious natural sites: the Mont Sainte-Victoire-Domaine de Roques-Hautes à ( 7 June -Le Tholonet), and l'Etang des Aulnes à Saint-Martin-de-Crau, (6 September). First dates in the Hautes-Alpes mountain Embrun (19 July), invitation @ festival Transhumance in Briançon (22 August - cité Vauban).
- 2010: Aires Libres will choose a single and major date on 5 September at the Domaine Departemental de l’Etang des Aulnes (Saint-Martin-de-Crau). Almost 6,000 people attended the 2010 concert.
- 2011: Back in Marseille, in Palais Longchamp, with Marsatac festival on the same week-end (2 October)
- 2012: previewed in Palais Longchamp, on 30 September, but festival canceled due to rain

Aires Libres is produced and organized by R2 (Marseille-Provence). Its founding members (Sébastien Manya, Hervé Lucien, Paul Santoni) are still at the head of the project, except for Yann Quélennec, a music journalist who died on 1 December 2005. Aires Libres has now official sponsorship from French institutions including the Conseil général des Bouches-du-Rhône, Conseil régional de Provence-Alpes-Côte d'Azur (Department Council), the Sessùn clothes brand and Red Bull Music Academy. The environmental management of the festival is also supported by ADEME.

== Past acts ==
- 2005: Spleen, « DJ $olal » (Philippe Cohen-Solal:Gotan Project ), AsWeFall, Erik Rug, DJ Oil, D-ED, DIRTY Sound System
- 2006: Uffie & Feadz, Murcof, Lawrence, Âme, James Taylor Swayzak, Patrice Tassy vs Manudub, Hazaak, D-ED, L'Amateur, Sundae, Paul
- 2007: Pantha du Prince, David Walters, Jacen Solo, Paul, 9th cloud, DIRTY sound System
- 2008: Fairmont, Kelpe, Clara Moto, Pilooski, Alif Tree, Krikor, Double U, Sundae, Popa Anca, Paul, Hauschka, Philippe Petit, DIRTY Sound System, DJ Oil, Eva Revox, Patrice Tassy, D-ED, Alcaline, A1 Sound System, Eva Peel.
- 2009: Padded Cell, Etienne Jaumet (Zombie Zombie), Maurice Fulton, Baris K, Mondkopf, Kantes, Sundae, Paul, L'amateur, Dimitri plays, Oh tiger Mountain, The FKClub, Likan, Fred Berthet-Dj Steef, Girlz inthegararge, DIRTY soundsystem,
- 2010: Âme, Tim Sweeney, Mekanik Kantatik, Kid Francescoli, Paul, L'Amateur, Marabout Fonk System
- 2011: L'Amateur, Beb Owsky, Garfld, Paul, Rone, Nina Kraviz.
- 2012: canceled: Mugwump, Baron retif & concepcion Perez, Paul, Mr Oat, JP, l'Amateur, Anticlimax

== Environment and artistic workshops ==
- Music:Initiation to Dj mix (Mimi)Computerized music– (Emaho), Circuit bending (Confipop), Retro Gaming (Archeopterix), Vintage synthesizers workshop (Etienne Jaumet).
- Visual arts: Wall drawing for children design by (Studioburo), Caly and preliminary sculpture (modelling) (Matière à faire), "Métrobidule" (train ticket bending)(Mattsatsat), picture for colouring (Underten).
- Visual art installation, Land art: Kakemonos (Charles), "Panoramiques" (Sundae),"Art-en-ciel & tourneseul", Ikebana.
- Environment: Guided visits of the sights, donkey rides, cycling activities, Increase of public’s awareness towards environment, dedicated workshops (WWF).
- Others: Aire Books (Reading), Aire Glisse (skateboard), Massages, Yoga classes for Children.

== See also ==
- List of electronic music festivals
