= In Paradisum (disambiguation) =

In paradisum is a Latin antiphon and movement of the Western Church's Requiem.

In Paradisum may also refer to:

== Albums ==
- In Paradisum, an album with requiems by Gabriel Fauré and Maurice Duruflé Cecilia Bartoli and Bryn Terfel 2010
- In Paradisum, an album by The Hilliard Ensemble of music by Giovanni Pierluigi da Palestrina and Tomás Luis de Victoria
- In Paradisum (album), a 2011 album by Symfonia

== Compositions ==
- In Paradisum, a composition by Maurice Duruflé from his Requiem
- In Paradisum, a composition by Karl Jenkins from his Requiem
- In Paradisum, a composition by Théodore Dubois
- In Paradisum, Op.25a, a composition by Huw Spratling

== Songs ==
- "In Paradisum", a song by Sarah Brightman from Eden
- "In Paradisum", a song by Sissel Kyrkjebø from Into Paradise
- "In Paradisum", a song by Symfonia from In Paradisum

== Other ==
- In Paradisum (record label), a French independent label
