= Solitude Nomade =

Studio album by Christine Ott
- Released: 13 May 2009
- Recorded: 2008–09
- Genre: Classical crossover, experimental, art music, contemporary classical music
- Length: 42:00
- Label: Tôt ou tard
- Producer: Christine Ott / Thierry Balasse

Christine Ott chronology
Solitude Nomade (2009)	Only Silence Remains (2016)

Solitude Nomade is the first solo album of Christine Ott, ondist (Ondes Martenot player) and pianist. The album is composed of instrumental tracks, in which the Ondes Martenot are the key instrument. (Pensées sauvages, Tropismes, Déchirures...). It was recorded with the help of 15 separate collaborators, including Yann Tiersen, Anne-Gaëlle Bisquay, François Pierron, Thierry Balasse, Eric Groleau, Monique Pierrot, Marc Sens, Ophir Lévy.

== Track listing ==
All music and lyrics are written by Christine Ott

1. "Pensées sauvages" - 3:38
2. "Tropismes" - 4:35
3. "L'autre rive" - 5:15
4. "Chemin vert" - 6:48
5. "Tête à l'envers" - 3:03
6. "Docks" - 3:52
7. "Solitude Nomade" - 4:31
8. "Lucioles" - 9:11
9. "Déchirures" - 5:40
10. "Lullaby" - 5:40

== Additional musicians ==
1. Yann Tiersen - violin (on 1)
2. Anne-Gaëlle Bisquay - cello (1,7,10)
3. François Pierron - Double bass (1,7)
4. Olivier Maurel - Vibraphone (2)
5. Monique Pierrot - 2nd Ondes Martenot (4,8)
6. Eric Groleau - Percussions, Drums (4,8,9)
7. Thierry Balasse - Soundscapes (6,9,10)
8. Marc Sens - Electric guitar (6,8)
9. Karen Nonnenmacher - Cymbalum (7)
10. Ophir Lévy - Oud (7)
11. Piotr Odrekhisky - Accordion (7)
