= Thomas Bloch =

French musician

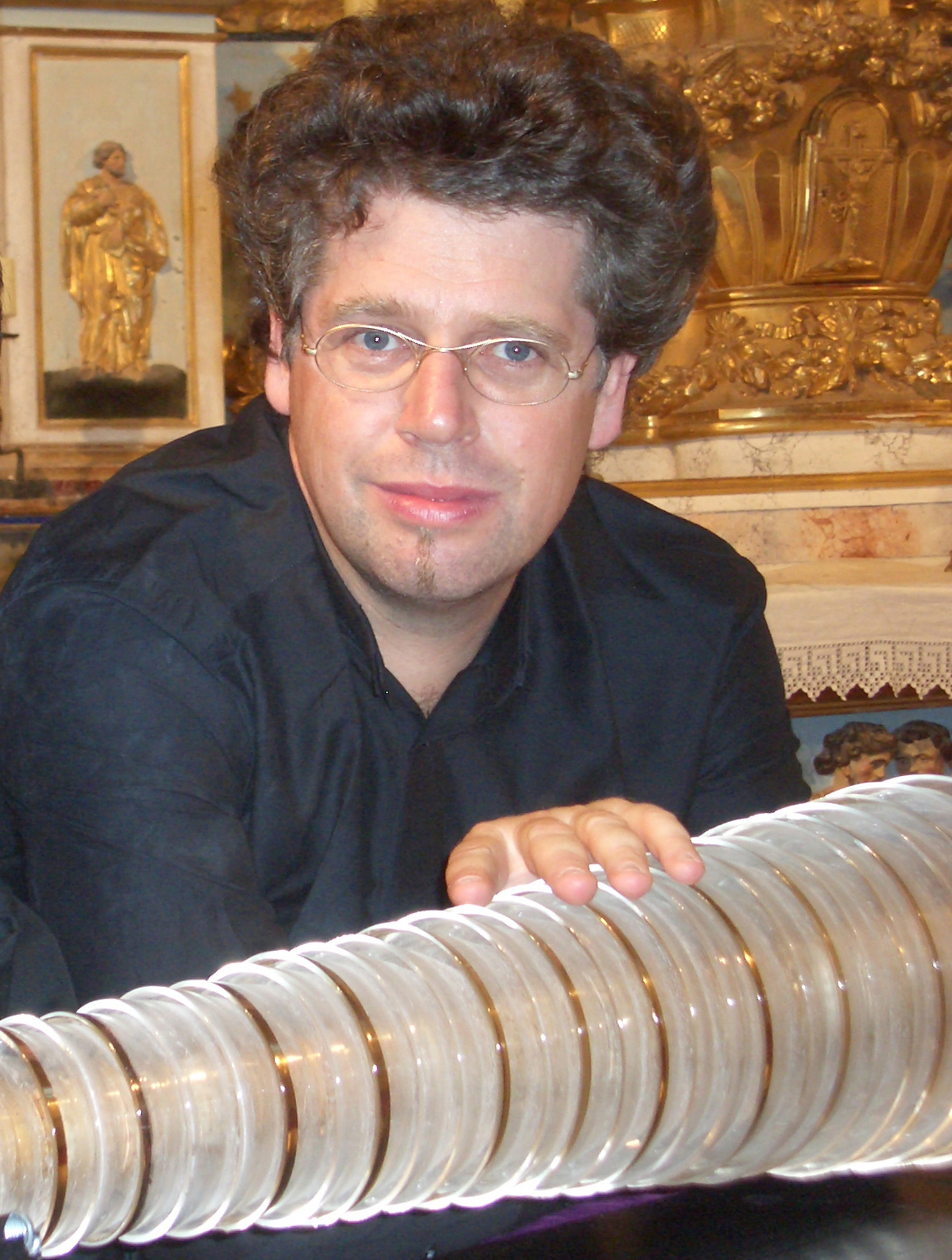
Thomas Bloch and his glass harmonica (2007)

Thomas Bloch (French: [tɔmas blɔk]; born 1962 in Colmar, France) is a classical musician specializing in the rare instruments ondes Martenot, glass harmonica, and Cristal Baschet.

Receiving a First Prize for ondes Martenot at the Paris Conservatoire National Supérieur de Musique (with Jeanne Loriod) and a master's degree in Musicology at the University of Strasbourg, Bloch has performed over 2500 times and appeared on over eighty recordings. Notable collaborations (concerts or recordings) include Radiohead, John Cage, Daft Punk, Damon Albarn / Gorillaz, Philip Clemo, Marianne Faithfull, Tom Waits and Bob Wilson.

== Biography ==
Bloch obtained a master's degree in musicology at the University of Strasbourg where he studied with Marc Honegger. He currently lives in Paris, France. He is acknowledged as an expert in the following rare instruments: the glass harmonica, the ondes Martenot and the Cristal Baschet. He has given thousands of performances in forty countries and taken part in more than eighty recordings all over the world. He performs in genres that span classical, contemporary, jazz, rock, ballet, world music, theatre and film score/soundtrack. As a soloist of rare instruments, he plays the complete classical and modern repertoire (including Messiaen, Varèse, and Richard Strauss) and also ten to fifteen premieres from contemporary music each year (Michel Redolfi, Regis Campo, Étienne Rolin, and others) and popular music composers (Jonny Greenwood, Damon Albarn). He also performs in many recording sessions.

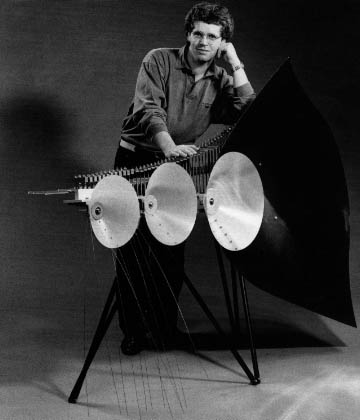
Thomas Bloch and cristal Baschet (1992)

Bloch has taught ondes Martenot at the Strasbourg Conservatoire since 1992, is responsible for presentations of instruments at the Paris Musée de la Musique, and is a musical director for music publishers, for the Évian Music Festival (France) and for the Glass Music International Festival 2005 in Paris Cité de la Musique (France).

== Performances and appearances ==
Bloch has performed for numerous movies, including the 2026 feature film Project Hail Mary and is a member of various ensembles. Among his many appearances and performances are the following: Amadeus (for the 2001 DVD edition), soloist in Milan La Scala (where he gave the first performance of the original version with glass harmonica of The Mad Scene from Donizetti's Lucia di Lammermoor) during a recital, and a tour with Tom Waits, Bob Wilson and Marianne Faithfull in The Black Rider (2004–2006).

== Awards ==
Thomas Bloch has been the recipient of some fifteen Conservatoire awards at Colmar, Strasbourg, including a First Prize for ondes Martenot at the Paris Conservatoire National Supérieur de Musique (with Jeanne Loriod). He was praised by critics in several music magazines and also in international composition competitions. Among other awards, he has won: the Classical Music Award 200 given by European critics in Cannes Midem, Victoires de la Musique and Prix de l'Académie Charles Cros, four times best soundtrack during the World subaquatic Movies Festival in Antibes, The Choice of Gramophon, Best of the Year 2001 in Audiophile, and Choc in Le Monde de la musique for his interpretation of the Turangalîla-Symphonie by Messiaen.

== Recordings ==
Bloch has recorded for a number of labels including Columbia, EMI, Erato Records, and Deutsche Grammophon. Since 1998, he has recorded for Naxos. His recordings include:

- Music for Glass Harmonica (8.555295)
- Music for Ondes Martenot (8.555779)
- Olivier Messiaen's Turangalîla-Symphonie (8.554478-79)
- Classical Chill (8.520101)
- Classical Heat (8.520102)
- Mozart : Life and Works (8.558061-64)
- Ecuatorial by Edgard Varèse
- Missa Cantate by Thomas Bloch.

== Videos ==
- A large choice of ondes Martenot, glass harmonica and cristal Baschet videos on Youtube played by Thomas Bloch
