= Feuillets inédits =

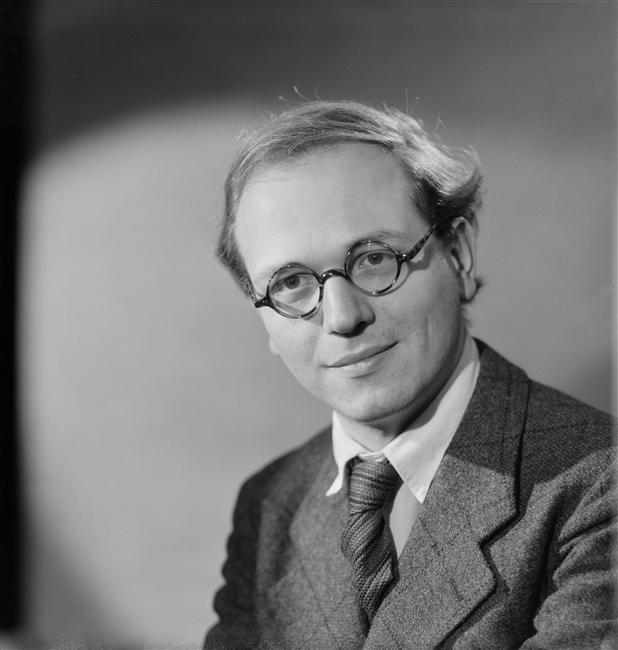
Olivier Messiaen in 1937

Feuillets inédits ("unpublished pages") are four disregarded works by Olivier Messiaen arranged and revised for piano and ondes Martenot by Yvonne Loriod in dedication to her sister Jeanne (nicknamed Nanou). Conceived in unspecified dates mid-1930s, they were published by Éditions Durand in 2001.

== Movements ==
Labelled after the original manuscripts, not present in the published score.

1. Déchiffrage
2. Solfège
3. Solfège
4. Solfège

The second and third pieces were incomplete and were supplemented by birdsong additions and chords by Loriod. The former is an arrangement of a sight-reading piece by Messiaen.
