= Chimères (pour Ondes Martenot) =

Studio album by Christine Ott
- Released: 22 May 2020
- Recorded: 2018
- Studio: Mer/Noir
- Genres: Classical crossover, experimental, art music, contemporary classical music
- Length: 47:00
- Label: Nahal Recordings
- Producers: Frederic D Oberland; Mondkopf

Christine Ott chronology
Only Silence Remains (2016)	Chimères (pour Ondes Martenot) (2020)	Time to Die (2021)

Chimères (pour Ondes Martenot) is the third solo album of Christine Ott. Chimères (pour Ondes Martenot) was entirely conceived using only Ott's Ondes Martenot. The album was produced by Paul Régimbeau (Mondkopf) and Frederic D Oberland (Oiseaux-Tempête), who arranged the tracks with the composer by manipulating the sounds of the Ondes Martenot via live effect boxes and sonic manipulation. The album opens with the piece "Comma", which has been compared to Olivier Messiaen's work, and the album develops eight pieces from contemporary classical to electronic music and avant-garde music, also compared to Sergei Prokofiev and Daniel Lopatin.

== Track listing ==
1. "Comma" – 6:12
2. "Darkstar" – 5:06
3. "Todeslied" – 8:52
4. "Mariposas" – 3:38
5. "Sirius" – 5:51
6. "Pulsar" – 2:28
7. "Eclipse" – 8:11
8. "Burning" – 6:46
