= Time to Die (Christine Ott album) =

Studio album by Christine Ott
- Released: 9 April 2021
- Genre: Classical crossover, experimental, art music, contemporary classical music
- Label: Gizeh Records

Christine Ott chronology
Chimères (pour Ondes Martenot) (2020)	Time to Die (2021)

Time to Die is the fourth solo album by Christine Ott, and is described as the sequel to her second album Only Silence Remains released in 2016. The album is opening by a reference to Ridley Scott's Blade Runner; the title track pivots around that Rutger Hauer monologue, here narrated by Casey Brown on a particular combination of Ondes Martenot, synthesizers, timpani and tubular bells. The album is then developing very different orchestrations on the subject of death and rebirth. For the musician and director Fredo Viola; "The way I see the album is as a series of quite cinematic meditations on the theme of death and dying, changing prismatically, up to that incredibly delicate and beautiful conclusion.."

== Track listing ==
1. "Time to Die" – 8:21
2. "Brumes" – 6:45
3. "Landscape" – 3:36
4. "Chasing Harp" – 4:02
5. "Horizons Fauves" – 7:00
6. "Comma Opening" – 6:58
7. "Miroirs" – 3:21
8. "Pluie" – 5:24
