= Gaston Couté =

French poet and singer

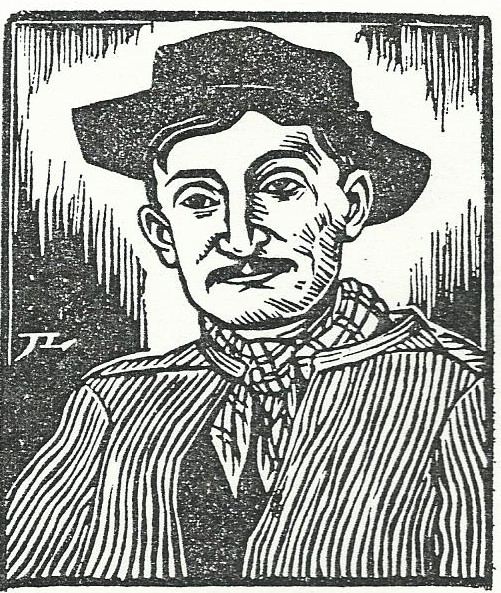
- Gaston Couté by Jean Lébédeff
- Born: 23 September 1880; Beaugency, France
- Died: 28 June 1911 (aged 30); 10th arrondissement of Paris, France
- Resting place: Meung-sur-Loire cemetery, France
- Occupations: Poet; chansonnier

Gaston Couté (23 September 1880 – 28 June 1911) was a French poet and singer, known for his pacifist and anarchist texts.

== Biography ==
Couté was the son of a miller and went to the lycée Pothier in Orléans, but left before taking the baccalauréat. He got a job as an assistant clerk at the Recette générale des Impôts (like a receiver general, but for tax) in Orléans and then he worked for a local newspaper called Le Progrès du Loiret. He then began to publish his poems, some of which were written in the Beauceron patois. He got the opportunity to have them heard by a troupe of Parisian artists on tour. After receiving some encouragement, Couté decided at the age of 18 in 1898 to go to Paris.

After several lean years, he found some success in cabarets. He also collaborated with Théodore Botrel for the journal La Bonne Chanson. Singer and poet Jehan Rictus, who based his poems on the use of slang, was aware of Couté's talent and said of him, "Georges Oble and me, we were undoubtedly in the presence of a teenager of genius who, to his extraordinary gifts, already combined a most skilful technique and in-depth knowledge of the profession". He also contributed to the libertarian newspapers La Barricade and frequently La Guerre Sociale.

He had a difficult end to his life: tuberculosis, absinthe and poverty. He died in 1911 from pulmonary congestion 24 hours after being taken to Lariboisière Hospital. At the time, he was about to be brought before the cour d'assises for having published an antimilitarist and revolutionary song in La Guerre Sociale praising "facts qualified as crimes". He was buried in the cemetery in Meung-sur-Loire, where there is a museum dedicated to him.

== Posthumous tributes ==
Couté's poems have been regularly interpreted, particularly in music and shows of the likes of Gérard Pierron, Marc Robine, Yves Deniaud, Bernard Meulien, Claude Antonini, Vania Adrien-Sens, Compagnie Grizzli, Compagnie Philibert Tambour, Le P'tit Crème, Hélène Maurice, Imbu, Bernard Gainier, Bruno Daraquy, Jan dau Melhau, Édith Piaf, Monique Morelli, Marc Ogeret, Claude Féron, Bernard Lavilliers, La Tordue, Loïc Lantoine and Gabriel Yacoub.
