= Digital Film Academy =

Art school in New York City and Atlanta, Georgia

Coordinates: 40.7600°N 73.9912°W

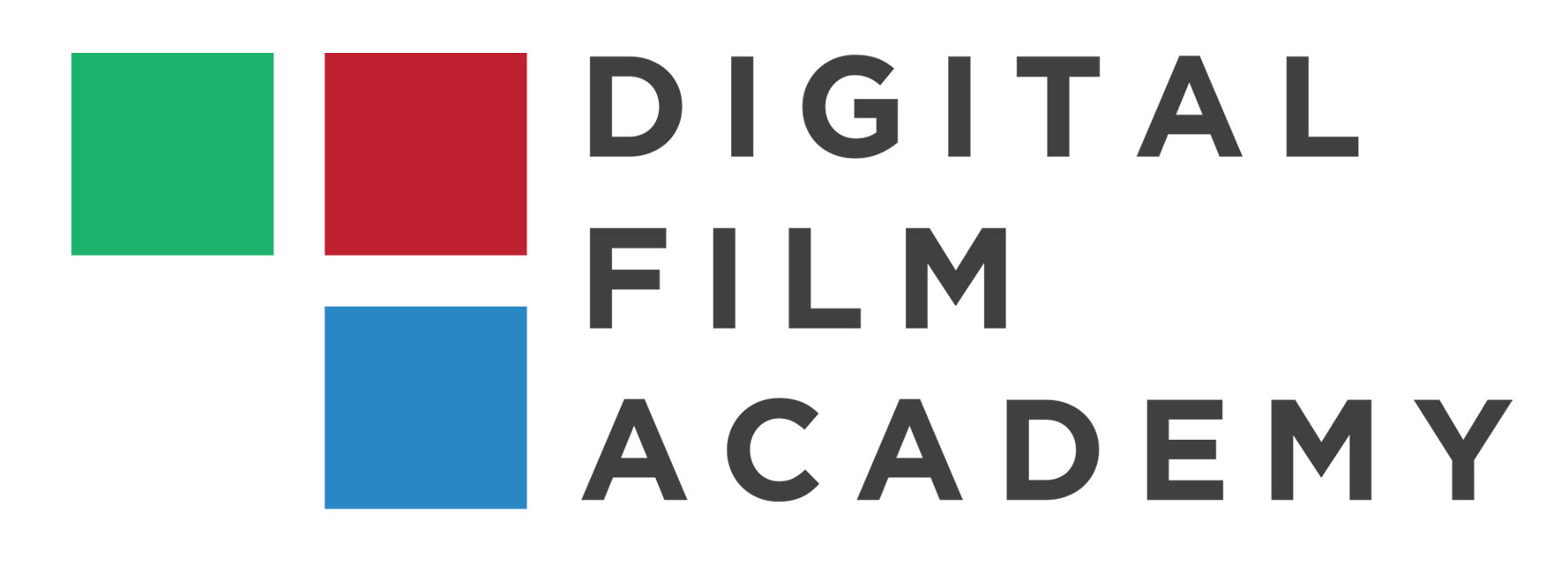
- Type: Film school
- Established: 2001
- Founders: Patrick DiRenna
- Administrative staff: 20
- Students: 200
- Location: Manhattan, New York and Atlanta, Georgia
- Campus: Urban
- Website: www.digitalfilmacademy.edu

The Digital Film Academy (DFA) was a for-profit art and design college in Manhattan, New York and Atlanta, Georgia. It was founded in 2001.

== History ==
DFA was established in 2001 by filmmaker Patrick DiRenna in the historic Film Center Building in Manhattan. DiRenna was inspired by the evolution of digital cameras which he saw as a democratization of filmmaking.

Digital Film Academy offered 16-month associate degrees in digital filmmaking, as well as one-year-long (12-month) conservatory programs both open to beginner and advanced level students. In April 2020, a new branch was opened in the downtown area of Atlanta, Georgia.

In 2018, the school had over 200 students every year which includes both American students and international students. (International students could apply for Curricular Practical Training, Optional Practical Training and STEM OPT, thus granting them up to 4 years of work authorization in the USA). The school was also authorized to enroll veterans as students under the GI Bill.

In Spring of 2024, the academy withdrew from accreditation and ceased operations.

== Admission ==
Admission was rolling, with new programs opening three times a year in Fall, Spring, and Summer terms.

== Notable alumni ==
- Chadwick Boseman, actor
- Phuttiphong Aroonpheng, Director of Manta Ray (film), Venice Film Festival winner 2018
- Ranvir Shorey, Indian actor known for classic movies like Mithya(a Black Comedy), Titli and Sonchiriya.
