= Wavemaker (disambiguation) =

WaveMaker is a Java-based low-code development platform.

Wavemaker(s) may also refer to:

- Wavemaker (media agency), the second largest media agency network in the world
- Wavemakers, 2012 Quebec documentary film
- Wave Makers, 2023 Taiwanese television series
