= The Burning Giants =

2026 film by Phuttiphong Aroonpheng

- Thai: ยักษ์ไหม้
- Directed by: Phuttiphong Aroonpheng
- Written by: Phuttiphong Aroonpheng
- Produced by: Mai Meksawan; Bee Thiam Tan; Ola Byszuk; Anouk Sluizer
- Starring: Awat Ratanapintha; Pakapol Srirongmuang; Waywiree Ittianunkul; Thanatwut Rodpai
- Cinematography: Emo Weemhoff
- Edited by: Daniel Hui
- Music by: Christine Ott; Mathieu Gabry
- Production company: Diversion
- Release date: 7 September 2026 (Venice)
- Running time: 118 minutes
- Countries: Thailand; France; Singapore; Netherlands
- Languages: Thai; Karen

The Burning Giants (Thai: ยักษ์ไหม้) is a 2026 fantasy drama film written and directed by Phuttiphong Aroonpheng. A co-production of Thailand, France, Singapore, and the Netherlands, it stars Awat Ratanapintha, Pakapol Srirongmuang, Waywiree Ittianunkul, and Thanatwut Rodpai.

The film had its world premiere in the Orizzonti section of the 83rd Venice International Film Festival on 7 September 2026.

== Premise ==
A Karen villager is infected with a disease whose symptoms include burns, while an Indigenous rights activist is killed for defending his village against eviction.

== Cast ==
- Awat Ratanapintha as Yak
- Pakapol Srirongmuang as Lak
- Waywiree Ittianunkul as Aeva
- Thanatwut Rodpai as Thulee

== Production ==
The film was first inspired by news of the murder of Porlajee "Billy" Rakchongcharoen, a Karen Indigenous rights activist, in 2014.

In January 2023, the project participated at the CineMart, held during the International Film Festival Rotterdam. It was presented at the Berlinale Co-Production Market in the same month. In November 2023, it was selected to participate at the QCinema Project Market.

In May 2025, Thai sales company Diversion announced that the film was in production on the Myanmar–Thailand border.

== Release ==
The Burning Giants had its world premiere in the Orizzonti section of the 83rd Venice International Film Festival on 7 September 2026. It will compete at the Asian Feature Film Competition at the 37th Singapore International Film Festival.

In July 2026, it was reported that Lucky Number had acquired the film's international sales rights.

== Accolades ==
Award / Film Festival	Date of ceremony	Category	Recipient(s)	Result	Ref.
Venice Film Festival	12 September 2026	Orizzonti Award for Best Film	Phuttiphong Aroonpheng	Nominated	
Asia Pacific Screen Awards	30 October 2026	Best Cinematography	Emo Weemhoff	Nominated	
