= No Time to Die (disambiguation) =

No Time to Die is a 2021 British-American spy action film and is the 25th film in the James Bond series.

No Time to Die may also refer to:

== Film and television ==
- No Time to Die (1958 film), a British war film by Terence Young
- No Time to Die (1984 film) (Danger – Keine Zeit zum Sterben), a 1984 film by Austrian filmmaker Helmut Ashley
- No Time to Die (2006 film), a German-Ghanaian film by King Ampaw
- "No Time to Die" (Columbo), an episode of Columbo

== Other uses ==
- No Time to Die, a 2014 novel by Kira Peikoff
- "No Time to Die" (song), by Billie Eilish, 2020
- No Time to Die (soundtrack), soundtrack to the 2021 film

== See also ==
- A Time to Die (disambiguation)
