= In Paradisum (record label) =

French Paris-based independent record label

- Founded: 2011
- Founder: Guillaume Heuguet, Paul Régimbeau
- Genre: Electronic music
- Location: Paris, France
- Official website: http://www.inparadisum.net

In Paradisum is a French independent record label based in Paris, France. It was founded by Guillaume Heuguet and Paul Régimbeau in 2011.

The catalog currently contains more than twenty records, regrouping various musical approaches (techno, experimental music, noise, ambient, drone, electronica).

== Biography ==
Initially, the record label used to throw techno parties and release maxis. It progressively took harder-to-define electronic directions, mostly exploring the album format. Recently, In Paradisum launched the IPX series (explorations around the live inspiration when it comes to studio-producing) and the « Spero Lucem » concerts (inspired by the spiritual concerts of the 16th century).

== Discography ==
=== Albums ===
- 2016 : Qoso - Printemps-Eté
- 2016 : Mondkopf - The Last Tales
- 2015 : Run Dust - Supermarché
- 2015 : Low Jack - Sewing Machine
- 2015 : Run Dust - Serf Rash
- 2014 : Extreme Precautions - I
- 2014 : Insiden - Above Us
- 2014 : Mondkopf - Hadès
- 2013 : Somaticae - Catharsis

=== Singles and maxis ===
- 2016 : Roger West - En Asie
- 2016 : December Kaumwald - Half Cuts 1
- 2015 : Sleaze Art - IPX03 - Infra-blast
- 2015 : Mätisse - IPX02 - Kairos
- 2015 : Somaticae - IPX01 - Electricité
- 2015 : Roger West - Wasted House
- 2014 : Somaticae - Pacurgis
- 2014 : Qoso - Jura
- 2013 : Low Jack - Flashes
- 2013 : Somaticae - Pointless
- 2013 : Qoso - Monica
- 2013 : Insiden & Saåad - Split
- 2013 : Low Jack & Qoso - Like It Soft
- 2012 : Mondkopf - Ease Your Pain Remixes
- 2012 : Ricardo Tobar - Esoteric/Carnaval
- 2012 : Somaticae - Dressed Like A Bubblegum
- 2012 : Mondkopf - Ease Your Pain
