= Only Silence Remains =

Studio album by Christine Ott
- Released: 20 May 2016
- Recorded: 2011–2015
- Genre: Classical crossover, experimental, art music, contemporary classical music
- Length: 44:00
- Label: Gizeh Records
- Producer: Christine Ott

Christine Ott chronology
Solitude Nomade (2009)	Only Silence Remains (2016)	Chimères (pour Ondes Martenot) (2020)

Only Silence Remains is the second solo album by Christine Ott. It is an album of great variety, instrumental (except the last track Disaster with the spoken voice of Casey Brown), from modern-classic to experimental music. Her approach on this album creates a space where the piano is the focal point and is accompanied by Ondes Martenot, harmonium, tubular bells, percussions and vintage keyboards. The album is linked to two original performances of the artist; 24 heures de la vie d'une femme and the live soundtrack Tabu.

== Track listing ==
All music and lyrics are written by Christine Ott

1. À mes étoiles - 3:38
2. Szczecin - 4:35
3. Sexy Moon - 5:15
4. Raintrain - 6:48
5. No memories - 3:52
6. Danse avec la neige - 4:31
7. Tempête - 9:11
8. Disaster - 5:40

The CD et Vinyl editions contains an alternative introduction of À mes étoiles.
