= Dee Edwards (singer) =

American singer

- Also known as: Dee Edwards
- Born: Doris Jean Edwards; June 19, 1945; Birmingham, Alabama, US
- Died: January 25, 2006 (aged 60) Detroit, Michigan, US
- Genres: Soul
- Occupations: Singer, painter
- Instrument: Vocals
- Label: Cotillion / Bump Shop

Doris Jean Edwards (June 19, 1945 – January 25, 2006), who recorded professionally under the name Dee Edwards, was an American singer of primarily soul music.

== Biography ==
Edwards was married to the arranger Floyd Jones, and they collaborated on some songs that Guido Marasco released on his GM and Bumpshop record labels in 1970, releasing "Say It Again With Feeling". After one RCA single in 1972, Jones followed up with the song for the De-To label, "I Can Deal With That", which was the last of Edwards' Detroit recording sessions.

The couple relocated to New York, enjoying Billboard chart action with a disco hit released on Cotillion in 1979, "Don't Sit Down", taken from the album Heavy Love, which also featured the ballad "No Love, No World" and her cover version of Acker Bilk's "Stranger On The Shore".

During the 1980s, Edwards recorded her own version of "It Has Come to My Attention", popular with the UK soul fraternity. A keen painter, Edwards then left the music industry to concentrate on her family in Detroit.

She died in 2006 of natural causes, at the age of 60.

== Legacy ==
One of the songs on Two Hearts Are Better than One, "Don't Walk Away", was covered by the American soul group the Four Tops on their nineteenth album Tonight! The song peaked at No. 16 on the UK Singles Chart.

In 2010 Adidas featured a remix of "Why Can't There Be Love" by Pilooski in a commercial for the 'Celebrating Originality on the Streets' campaign.

In 2015, Tyler, the Creator interpolated a section of "Why Can't There Be Love" for the song "Deathcamp" on his third studio album Cherry Bomb.

== Singles ==
- "My Time Is Important to Me"
- "You Say You Love Me"
- "Too Careless with My Love"
- "Oh What a Party"
- "Happiness Is Where You Find It"
- "Why Can’t There Be Love"
- "All the Way Home"
- "His Majesty, My Love"
- "Say It Again with Feeling"
- "All We Need Is a Miracle"
- "I Can Deal with That"
- "'Don't Sit Down"
- "Mr. Miracle Man"

== Albums ==
- "Two Hearts Are Better than One" 1980 (Cotillon COT 50 745)
