= Turangalîla-Symphonie =

Symphony by Olivier Messiaen (1908-92)

- for piano, ondes Martenot, and orchestra
- by Olivier Messiaen
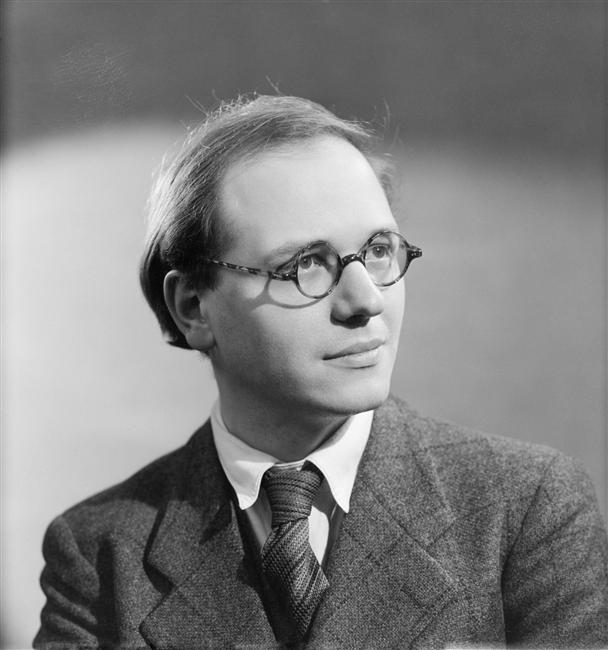
- Messiaen in 1937
- Other name: Turangalîla
- Catalogue: Simeone: I/29
- Period: 20th-century music
- Genre: Symphony
- Commissioned by: Serge Koussevitsky
- Based on: Tristan and Iseult
- Composed: 17 July 1946 – 29 November 1948 (rev. 1990)
- Dedication: In memoriam Natalie Koussevitsky (manuscript; published copy bears no dedication)
- Publisher: Durand
- Duration: about 80 minutes
- Movements: 10
- Scoring: Large orchestra, ondes Martenot, and piano

Premiere
- Date: 2 December 1949
- Location: Symphony Hall, Boston, Massachusetts, U. S.
- Conductor: Leonard Bernstein
- Performers: Boston Symphony Orchestra; Yvonne Loriod (piano); Ginette Martenot (onde Martenot)

The Turangalîla-symphonie is the only symphony by the French composer Olivier Messiaen (1908–1992). It was written for an orchestra of large forces from 1946 to 1948 on a commission by Serge Koussevitzky for the Boston Symphony Orchestra, with two soloists playing piano and ondes Martenot. Along with the Quatuor pour la fin du temps, the symphony is one of the composer's most notable works.

Leonard Bernstein conducted the premiere in Symphony Hall in Boston on 2 December 1949, followed by the New York City première at Carnegie Hall on 10 December (Messiaen's 41st birthday). The latter two performances included an intermission after the fifth movement and were the only work on the programme. The commission did not specify the duration, orchestral requirements or style of the piece, leaving the decisions to the composer. Koussevitzky was scheduled to conduct the première, but fell ill, and the task fell to Bernstein, (Note: Music journalist Andrew Ford wrote that Bernstein was "the ideal conductor for it, and it made Messiaen's name more widely known".) who never again conducted the work. Yvonne Loriod, who later became Messiaen's second wife, was the piano soloist, and Ginette Martenot played the ondes Martenot for these first performances. The French premiere, conducted by Roger Désormière, took place on July 25, 1950, as part of the third edition of the Festival d’Aix-en-Provence and was broadcast live on national radio. The work's success with the public can be attributed to its aesthetic merit as well as the quality of the performance.

From 1953 on, Yvonne's sister Jeanne Loriod was the ondes Martenot player in many performances and recordings.

== Concept ==
While most of Messiaen's compositions are religious in inspiration, at the time of writing the symphony the composer was fascinated by the myth of Tristan and Iseult. Turangalîla forms the central work in his trilogy of compositions concerned with the themes of romantic love and death; the other pieces are Harawi for piano with soprano and Cinq rechants for unaccompanied trios of soprani, alti, tenors, and basses. It is considered one of the greatest musical compositions of the twentieth century, being described by its commissioner as 'the most important piece of classical music ever written since Igor Stravinsky's The Rite of Spring'. A typical performance runs around 80 minutes in length. Messiaen once summarised the entire symphony as being "a love song; a hymn to joy."

Although the concept of a rhythmic scale corresponding to the chromatic scale of pitches occurs in Messiaen's work as early as 1944 in his Vingt regards sur l'enfant-Jésus (a suite Messiaen quotes in the fourth movement), the arrangement of such durations into a fixed series occurs for the first time in the opening episode of the work's seventh movement, Turangalîla 2, and is an important historical step toward the concept of integral serialism.

The title of the work, and those of its movements, were a late addition to the project, chosen after Messiaen made a list of the work's movements. He described the name in his letters from 1947 to 1948. He derived the title from two Sanskrit words, turaṅga (तुरङ्ग) and līlā (लीला), which he explained thus:

"Lîla" literally means play – but play in the sense of the divine action upon the cosmos, the play of creation, destruction, reconstruction, the play of life and death. "Lila" is also love. "Turanga": this is the time that runs, like a galloping horse; this is time that flows, like sand in an hourglass. "Turanga" is movement and rhythm. "Turangalîla" therefore means all at once love song, hymn to joy, time, movement, rhythm, life and death.

Messiaen described the joy of Turangalîla as "superhuman, overflowing, blinding, unlimited". He revised the work's orchestration in 1990.

== Instrumentation ==
The piece is scored for a large orchestra, consisting of the following instruments:

Woodwinds

1 piccolo
2 flutes
2 oboes
1 cor anglais
2 clarinets
1 bass clarinet
3 bassoons

Brass

4 horns
3 trumpets
1 trumpet in D
1 cornet
3 trombones
1 tuba

Percussion (12 percussionists)

vibraphone
keyed or mallet glockenspiels
triangle
temple blocks
wood block
crash cymbals
3 types of suspended cymbals (standard, Turkish, and Chinese)
tam-tam
tambourine
maracas
snare drum
provençal tabor
bass drum
tubular bells

Keyboards

solo piano
ondes Martenot
celesta

Strings

32 violins
14 violas
12 cellos
10 double basses

Interestingly, the piece does not require timpani, notwithstanding the use of a very large percussion section. The demanding piano part includes several solo cadenzas.

== Cyclic themes ==
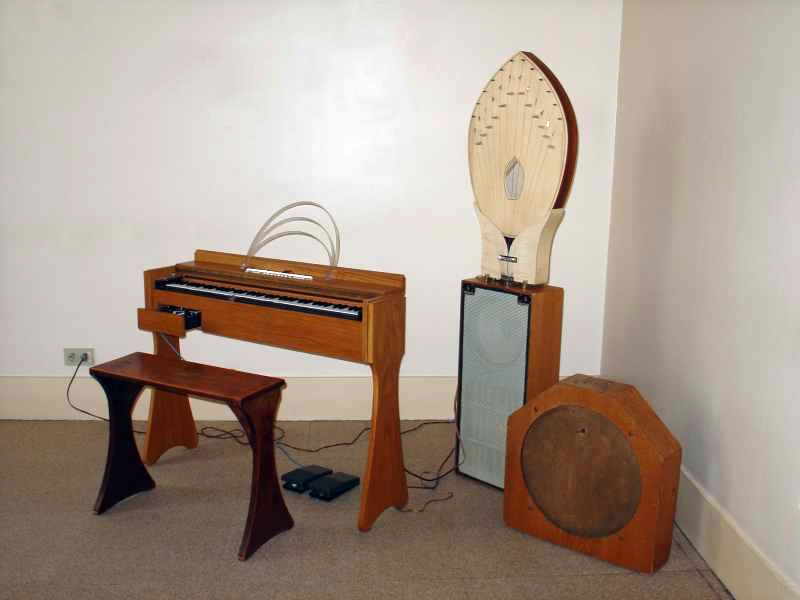
The ondes Martenot, an early electronic instrument, is used in sensuous and dramatic parts of the Turangalila such as the "love theme"

In writing about the work, Messiaen identified four cyclic themes that reappear throughout; there are other themes specific to each movement. In the score the themes are numbered, but in later writings he gave them names to make them easier to identify, without intending the names to have any other, literary meaning.

| Introduced by trombones and tuba, this is the statue theme. According to Messiaen, it has the oppressive, terrible brutality of ancient Mexican monuments, and has always evoked dread. It is played in a slow tempo, pesante. (Note: This example is taken from the CD booklet included with the Chung recording. It was written in the hand of Yvonne Loriod, and has the low D (D_{2}) assigned to the third trombone as shown. However, in the 1990 revision, the note is written an octave higher (D_{3}).) |

| This is the flower theme. It is introduced by two clarinets. |

| This theme, the most important of all, is the love theme. It appears in many different guises, from hushed strings in movement 6, to a full orchestral treatment in the climax of the finale. |

| A simple chain of chords, used to produce opposing chords on the piano and crossing counterpoints in the orchestra. |

== Structure ==
The work is in ten movements, linked by the common themes identified above, and other musical ideas:

I. Introduction

II. Chant d’amour 1

III. Turangalîla 1

IV. Chant d’amour 2

V. Joie du sang des étoiles

VI. Jardin du sommeil d’amour

VII. Turangalîla 2

VIII. Développement d’amour

IX. Turangalîla 3

X. Final

1. Introduction. Modéré, un peu vif
  A "curtain raiser" introducing the "statue theme" and the "flower theme", followed by the body of the movement, which superimposes two ostinato groups with rhythmic punctuations. A reprise of the "statue" theme closes the introduction.
2. Chant d’amour (Love song) 1. Modéré, lourd
  After an atonal introduction, this movement is built on an alternation of a fast and passionate theme dominated by the trumpets, and a soft and gentle theme for the strings and ondes.
3. Turangalîla 1. Presque lent, rêveur
  Three themes are stated: one starting with a solo clarinet, the second for low brass and strings, and the third a sinuous theme on the woodwinds. The movement then develops and, later, overlaps the themes, with the addition of a new rhythm in the percussion.
4. Chant d’amour 2. Bien modéré
  Introduced by a scherzo for piccolo and bassoon, this movement is in nine sections, some of which recall and develop music heard earlier. A calm coda in A major brings it to a close.
5. Joie du sang des étoiles (Joy of the Blood of the Stars). Vif, passionné avec joie
  A frenetic dance whose main theme is a fast variant of the "statue theme". For Messiaen, it represented the union of two lovers seen as a transformation on a cosmic scale. The dance is interrupted by a shattering piano cadenza before a brief orchestral coda.
6. Jardin du sommeil d’amour (Garden of Love’s Sleep). Très modéré, très tendre
  The first full rendition of the "love" theme in the strings and ondes is accompanied by idealized birdsong played by the piano, and by other orchestral coloristic effects. According to Messiaen, "The two lovers are enclosed in love's sleep. A landscape comes out from them..."
7. Turangalîla 2. Un peu vif, bien modéré
  A completely atonal movement that is intended to invoke terror, with a predominant role for the percussion ensemble.
8. Développement d’amour (Development of Love). Bien modéré
  For Messiaen, the title can be considered in two ways. For the lovers, it is terrible: united by the love potion, they are trapped in a passion growing to the infinite. Musically, this is the work's development section.
9. Turangalîla 3. Bien modéré
  A theme is introduced by the woodwind. A five-part percussion ensemble introduces a rhythmic series that then sustains a set of superimposed variations on the woodwind theme.
10. Final. Modéré, presque vif, avec une grande joie
  The movement is in sonata form: A brass fanfare, coupled with a fast variation of the "love theme", is developed and leads to a long coda, a final version of the "love" theme played fortissimo by the entire orchestra. The work ends on an enormous F♯ major chord. In Messiaen's words, "glory and joy are without end".

The composer's initial plan was for a symphony in the conventional four movements, which eventually became numbers 1, 4, 6, and 10. Next, he added the three Turangalîla movements, which he originally called tâlas, a reference to the use of rhythm in Indian classical music. Finally, the 2nd, 5th, and 8th movements were inserted. Early on, Messiaen authorized separate performance of movements 3, 4, and 5, as Three tâlas (not to be confused with the original use of the term for the three Turangalîla movements), but later came to disapprove of the performance of extracts.

== Recordings ==
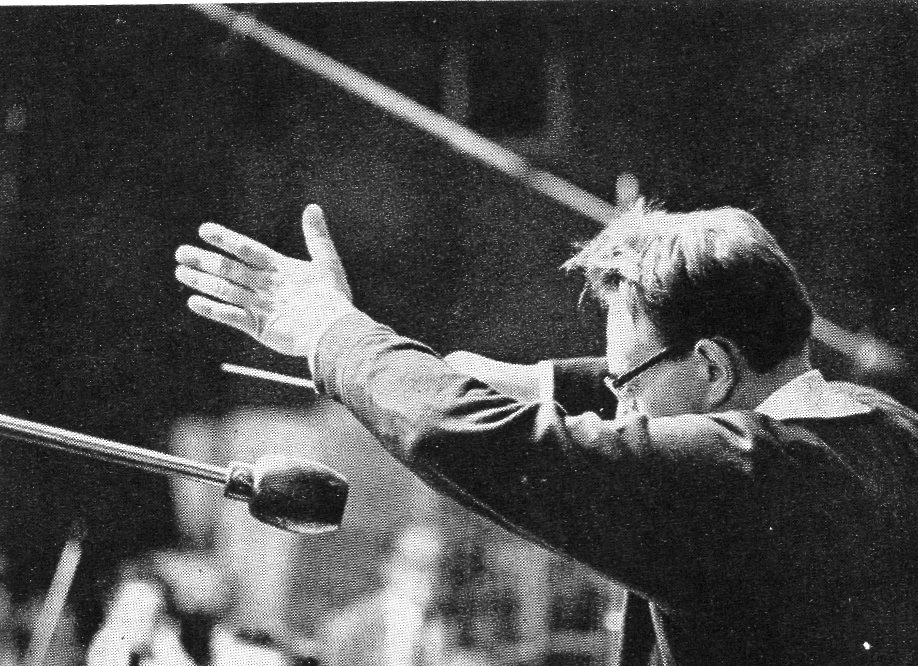
Maurice Le Roux conducting the Turangalila-Symphonie

No recording was made of the world premiere, and Bernstein himself did not return to the work in either concert performance or in the recording studio, but a recording exists of part of the rehearsals for the premiere in Boston, featuring the fifth and sixth movements.

It was released in 2013 as part of a set of previously unissued Bernstein recordings (Music and Arts WHRA-6048).

Recordings of Turangalîla-Symphonie
| Conductor | Orchestra | Piano | Ondes martenot | Label | Catalog | Released | Format | Notes |
|---|---|---|---|---|---|---|---|---|
| Roger Désormière | Orchestre National de la RTF | Yvonne Loriod | Ginette Martenot | INA | | 1950 | | Live recording on 25 July 1950, of the European premiere at the Aix-en-Provence Festival |
| Hans Rosbaud | SWF-Sinfonieorchester Baden-Baden | Yvonne Loriod | Ginette Martenot | Wergo | WER 6401-2 | 1992 | | Recorded 23/24 December 1951 |
| Maurice Le Roux | Orchestre National de la RTF | Yvonne Loriod | Jeanne Loriod | Vega/Accord | VAL 127; Vega C 30 ST 20033/4; Vega C 35 X 940 | 1962 | Box set; 10-inch LPs | Recording supervised by Messiaen in 1961. Released in France |
| Jean Fournet | Netherlands Radio Philharmonic | Yvonne Loriod | Jeanne Loriod | Q Disc | | 1967 | | Live |
| Seiji Ozawa | Toronto Symphony Orchestra | Yvonne Loriod | Jeanne Loriod | RCA | | 1967 | | |
| André Previn | London Symphony Orchestra | Michel Béroff | Jeanne Loriod | EMI | SLS 5117 | 1977 | Double LP | |
| Louis de Froment | Orchestre Symphonique de RTL | Yvonne Loriod | Jeanne Loriod | Forlane | | 1982 | | Live |
| Esa-Pekka Salonen | Philharmonia Orchestra | Paul Crossley | Tristan Murail | CBS Masterworks; Sony | I2M 42126; G010003836824C | 1985; 2018 | 2 LPs; CD | |
| Simon Rattle | City of Birmingham Symphony Orchestra | Peter Donohoe | Tristan Murail | EMI | EX270468-3; 747463-8 | 1986 | LP; CD | |
| Myung-Whun Chung | Orchestre de l'Opéra Bastille | Yvonne Loriod | Jeanne Loriod | Deutsche Grammophon | 0289 431 7812 9 | 1990 | CD | First recording of the revised version, supervised by Messiaen. |
| Riccardo Chailly | Royal Concertgebouw Orchestra | Jean-Yves Thibaudet | Takashi Harada | Decca | London 436 626–2 | 1993; 2012 | CD | |
| Marek Janowski | Orchestre philharmonique de Radio France | Roger Muraro | Valérie Hartmann-Claverie | RCA | 09026 61520 2 | 1992 | | |
| Yan Pascal Tortelier | BBC Philharmonic | Howard Shelley | Valérie Hartmann-Claverie | Chandos | CHAN9678 | 1998 | CD | |
| Antoni Wit | Polish National Radio Symphony Orchestra | François Weigel | Thomas Bloch | Naxos | 8.554478-9 | 1998 | CD | |
| Hans Vonk | Saint Louis Symphony Orchestra | Garrick Ohlsson | Jean Laurendeau | Pentatone | | 1999 | | Live |
| Kent Nagano | Berliner Philharmoniker | Pierre-Laurent Aimard | Dominique Kim | Teldec | 8573-82043-2 | 2001 | CD | Live recording in March 2000 in Berlin |
| Norichika Iimori | Tokyo Symphony Orchestra | Kazuoki Fujii | Takashi Harada | Canyon | | 2001 | | |
| Ryusuke Numajiri | Japan Philharmonic Orchestra | Ichiro Nodaira | Takashi Harada | Exton | | 2002 | | Live |
| Thierry Fischer | BBC National Orchestra of Wales | Roger Muraro | Jacques Tchamkerten | BBC Music | | 2006 | | Live |
| Hiroyuki Iwaki | Melbourne Symphony Orchestra | Kaori Kimura | Takashi Harada | ABC Classics | 4812873 | 2007 | CD | Live recording in 1985. Re-released 2007. |
| Sylvain Cambreling | SWR Sinfonieorchester Baden-Baden und Freiburg | Roger Muraro | Valérie Hartmann-Claverie | Hänssler Classic | 93.225 | 2008 | CD | |
| Juanjo Mena | Bergen Philharmonic Orchestra | Steven Osborne | Cynthia Millar | Hyperion | A67816 | 2012 | CD | |
| Hannu Lintu | Finnish Radio Symphony Orchestra | Angela Hewitt | Valérie Hartmann-Claverie | Ondine | ODE12515 | 2014 | CD | |
| Yutaka Sado | Tonkünstler Orchestra | Roger Muraro | Valérie Hartmann-Claverie | Tonkünstler Orchestra | TON2005 | 2018 | CD | |
| Gustavo Gimeno | Toronto Symphony Orchestra | Marc-André Hamelin | Nathalie Forget | Harmonia Mundi | HMM905336 | 2024 | CD | Live |
| Andris Nelsons | Boston Symphony Orchestra | Yuja Wang | Cécile Lartigau | Deutsche Grammophon | UPC00028948670451 | 2024 | CD (2025) | |

== See also ==
- Classic 100 Music of France (ABC)
- Leela, a character from Futurama named after the Turangalîla-symphonie
