= Les Siestes Electroniques =

Music festival in Toulouse, France

- Genre: Electronic dance music
- Locations: Toulouse, Southern France
- Years active: 2003-present
- Website: official webpage

Based in Toulouse, Southern France, Les Siestes électroniques is a summer festival dedicated to emerging artists from the field of music & digital culture.

== History ==
Its motley line-up mainly focuses on electronic musicians and aims at a professional audience as well as the general public. The fact that its open-air concerts are free of charge makes Les Siestes électroniques a rare occurrence within the landscapes of European festivals. Les Siestes offers an opportunity to experience contemporary music though concerts, club nights, workshops and sometimes exhibitions.
The festival runs for four or five days, usually starting on a Wednesday or a Thursday in the last week of June. Next edition of the festival will be held June 26–29, 2014.
Les Siestes Electroniques has been an event by Rotation since 2002.

Since 2011 the festival falls into two editions. One takes place in Toulouse and the other in Paris at the Musée du quai Branly. Born of a reflection around the themes of the cultural diversity, the parisian edition proposes to musicians an exceptional access to the audio collection of the museum (dedicated to non-occidental cultures). These musicians will thus be invited to sample a set of resources of an unsuspected wealth, and then to replay it during an ultimate public event which is free and open-air

== Line-Up ==
- 2013 @ Toulouse: Marvin, Pneu, Electric Electric, Papier Tigre, Bipolar, Dscrd, Polar Inertia, Cold, DIY Music Academy, Redshape, The Analogue Cops, Dj Deep, Polygron, Sturqen, Cut Hands, Boston Bun, Paris Suit Yourself, Andy Stott, Spectral Park, Redinho

@ Paris: Vincent Moon, Kangding Ray, Sinner DC, Pierre Bastien, Sylvain Chauveau, Low Jack, Dj Arc de Triomphe, Gangpol & Mit

- 2012 @ Toulouse: Nils Frahm, Elektro Guzzi, Hypnolove, Funkineven, Pional, John Talabot, Saaad, Morphosis, Matthew Friedberger, James Blackshaw, Kassem Mosse, Tom Terrien, Tanya Tagaq, Aymeric Hainaux, Bruce Lamont, Luke Abbott

@ Paris: Plapla Pinky, Keith Fullerton Whithman, Alan Bishop, Hicham Chadly, Sam Tiba, Jean Nipon, Doug Shipton, NLF3, Arandel

- 2011 @ Toulouse: Villa Nah, Lone, Umberto, Connan Mockasin, James Pants, Ata, Prins Thomas, Arto Mwambe, Oliver Hafenbauer, Etienne Tron, Shangaan Electro, DIRTY Soundsystem, Arnaud Fleurent Didier, Cadik Travel Agency, Lucrecia Dalt, Jess & Crabe

@ Paris: Paris : Débruit, Pilooski, The Berg Sans Nipple, Bimbo Tower Sound System, Secousse Sound System, Awesome Tapes From Africa, Romain BNO, Laurent Jeanneau

- 2010 : Kawabata Makoto, Keiji Haino, Stanley Brinks, Pantha du Prince, Joakim, Jackson and his computer band, Es, The Ruby Suns, Machine Drum, Mount Kimbie, Junior Boys, Rebolledo, Chateau Marmont, Marc Démereau, Aquaserge
- 2009 : Alva Noto, Ariel Pink, Para One & San Serac, Kim Hiorthoy, Dominique Leone, Hudson Mohawke, Fukkk Offf, Prosumer, Suicide Club, Anoraak, The Eternals, Lawrence, Isolée, Dj Koze, Ghostape, Etienne Jaumet, Half a rainbow, Larytta
- 2008 : Atom Heart, Tenori-On, Bertrand Burgalat, Fancy, Turzi, Sebastien Tellier, Lindstrøm, Damon & Naomi, Damian Lazarus, Les Shades, So So Modern, American Tourister, A Mountain of One, Milky Globe & Isan, The Emperor Machine, Mondkopf, Dapayk & Padberg, Errorsmith
- 2007 : Para One, Superpitcher, Pascal Comelade, Sebastien Tellier, Fujiya & Miyagi, Joakim, Robert Henke, Appleblim, Pierre Bastien, Charlemagne Palestine, Xela, Kammerflimmer Kollektief, Château Flight, Echo, Todd Terje, Marco Passarani, Henning, Angel, Anton Prize, Pigna People
- 2006 : Juan Atkins, Modeselektor, Legowelt, Kevin Blechdom, A Hawk and a Hacksaw, Toshiyuki Yasuda, Schneider TM, Ada, Justus Koehncke, Taylor Savvy, Hauscka, Marion Lambert, Daniel Wang, Tellemake, Midi & Demix, France Copland, Koyote & Goon, Electroluxe, Midaircondo, Krikor, Ensemble, Avia Gardner, Opiate, Juicy Panic
- 2005 : DAT Politics, Vladislav Delay, Agf, Marc Collin, Jan Jelinek, Sylvain Chauveau, Modeselektor, Feadz, Mike Dred, Magnetophone, Funckarma, Thomas Fehlman, Rex The Dog, Dexima, Fedaden, Trapist, Brooks, Masha Qrella, Phonem, Nôze, Daniel Meteo
- 2004 : Funkstörung, Richard Devine, Lusine ICL, Dabrye, Arovane, Bernhard Fleischmann, Tujiko Noriko, Benge, Jonas Bering, Yoshihiro Hanno, Orchestre de chambre de Toulouse, Sink, Suzywan, Donna Regina, Téléfax, Aoki Takamasa, Gangpol und Mit, Cabanne, Won, Domotic, The Konki Duet, Softland, Ark
- 2003 : Sylvain Chauveau, Murcof, Colleen, Hermann & Kleine, Apparat, VS Price, Hensley, Sogar, Arco5, Del Wire, Braille & Angström Crew, Aoki Takamasa, Miles Whittaker, Aurel, Bmx

== International Edition ==
Since 2007, Les Siestes Electroniques have developed internationally their project.

- Les Siestes Electroniques @ BERLIN, January 2007
- Les Siestes Electroniques @ RIGA, April 2007
- Les Siestes Electroniques @ LA HAYE, September 2007
- Les Siestes Electroniques @ CAIRO, February 2008
- Les Siestes Electroniques @ KYOTO, October 2008
- Les Siestes Electroniques @ MONTREAL, August 2009
- Les Siestes Electroniques @ BRAZZAVILLE, November 2010
- Les Siestes Electroniques @ BERLIN, February 2011
- Les Siestes Electroniques @ BERLIN, September 2011
- Les Siestes Electroniques @ ABU DHABI, June 2012
- Les Siestes Electroniques @ BERLIN, September 2012
- Les Siestes Electroniques @ BRAZZAVILLE, November 2012
- Les Siestes Electroniques @ MONTEVIDEO & BUENOS AIRES, April 2013
- Les Siestes Electroniques @ AMSTERDAM, June 2013
- Les Siestes Electroniques @ MONTRÉAL, July 2013
- Les Siestes Electroniques @ SAIGON & HANOI, October 2013

== See also ==
- List of electronic music festivals
