= Ginette Martenot =

French musician (1902–1996)

- Born: January 27, 1902; Paris
- Died: September 6, 1996 (aged 94); Neuilly-sur-Seine
- Education: Conservatoire de Paris
- Known for: Ondes Martenot
- Spouse: Didier Lazard

Ginette Martenot (1902–1996) was a French pianist, and an expert and leading performer on the twentieth-century electronic instrument the ondes Martenot, which was invented by her brother Maurice. At the age of sixteen, she entered the Paris Conservatory, where she studied counterpoint and fugue with the composer Arthur Honegger. She gave the first performance (and subsequently made recordings) as solo ondist in Messiaen's Turangalîla-Symphonie, with Yvonne Loriod taking the solo piano part.

Martenot taught the composer Serge Nigg.

Martenot composed and performed the score for the 1964 Canadian short documentary, Le Monde va nous prendre pour des sauvages. (English title: People Might Laugh at Us.) Directed by Françoise Bujold and Jacques Godbout, the film depicts Mi'kmaq children on a reserve in Maria, Quebec.

She was the sister of Madeleine Martenot, a pianist and pedagogue.

== Notable performances ==
On December 10, 1949, Ginette Martenot performed on the ondes Martenot in the premier of Messiaen's Turangalîla-Symphonie with the Boston Symphony Orchestra, conducted by Leonard Bernstein. The part was written for Martenot herself, with Messiaen describing her as "the only possible ondiste" for his work, and "the perfect virtuoso," in a 1949 letter to Serge Koussevitzky.

== Awards ==
On April 20, 1995, Martenot was admitted to the Ordre des Arts et des Lettres at the rank of Commandeur.

Martenot received a Grand Prix for conducting an ensemble of ondes Martenot in a performance of Messiaen's unpublished 1937 work, Fête des belles eaux.

== Publications ==
- "Voies nouvelles pour présenter la musique à l'enfant," [New methods for introducing music to children] by Ginette Martenot. Published in the international education review, "Pour l'Ère Nouvelle," January 1933.
- "Influence du rhythme et du temps rhythmique sur l'enfant," [The influence of rhythm and rhythmic meter on the child] by Ginette and Maurice Martenot. Published in the international education review, "Pour l'Ère Nouvelle," July 1934.
