= Low Jack =

Honduran-French electronic musician

- Low Jack in 2015

Background information
- Birth name: Philippe Hallais
- Born: 1985 (age 39–40); Tegucigalpa, Honduras
- Genres: Electronic
- Years active: 2012–present

Philippe Hallais, aka Low Jack (born 1985), is an electronic music composer and DJ, living in Paris.

For four years, he has been tightening together club-oriented and experimental music sounds, and acting as a DJ and live performer in clubs and the digital arts & music festival circuit.

== Biography ==
Hallais was born in Tegucigalpa (Honduras). He entered the music world through a series of dance music EPs, with the Slow Dance EP charting #1 on Clone.nl. Slow Dance, Free Pyjamas, Like It Soft and Flashes show his sound palette, from electro influenced by artists like The Egyptian Lover to more tense and dark techno.

His first long-player Garifuna Variations, was released in 2014 by the dance label L.I.E.S (New York). Based on a commissioned live performance by the French Musée du Quai Branly and festival Les Siestes Electroniques, the recordings put together the imaginary tales and sounds of the Garifuna people, a tribe from Honduras about which little is known. The result has been described as a sonic fiction blending ethnographic recordings and industrial music.

This same year, he began touring as a DJ in France. In 2014, he was invited by the GRM (a French national institution in electronic experimental music) to play for the celebration of the anniversary of the institution.

2015 began with the release of Imaginary Boogie, a 6 tracks EP on The Trilogy Tapes (London) presented as a failed attempt at producing "boogie-infused" house music. His second album Sewing Machine on French label In Paradisum (Paris) marked a decisive step with profile from national press Libération, as well as reviews in specialist music publications like Fact Magazine, The Quietus, Tsugi, Les Inrockuptibles. According to Philip Sherburne writing for Pitchfork Media, "Low Jack (aka Philippe Hallais) is one of the more exciting producers to emerge from the experimental techno community".

Low Jack was selected by the SHAPE program, a European Union funded cultural program based on the vote of major festival programmers and aimed at helping the flourishing of new talent in European culture. A tour of more than 25 shows followed, with appearances at CTM, Unsound, Berghain and more. The first artist to record for the Red Bull Studio Paris Sessions, he played for the closing of the Red Bull Music Academy in Paris in November 2015. Low Jack's new album, entitled Lighthouse stories, was released on Modern Love (Manchester) on 1 April 2016.
