= Tom Wood (author) =

British author of thriller novels

- Born: Tom Hinshelwood; Burton upon Trent, Staffordshire, England
- Occupations: Writer, novelist, freelance editor, film-maker
- Writing career
- Language: English
- Period: 2010–present
- Subjects: Political thriller, techno-thriller, action thriller

Tom Wood, pseudonym of Tom Hinshelwood, is a British author of thriller novels. Wood's first published book rights to The Hunter have been acquired by Studiocanal.

== Biography ==
=== Early life ===
Tom was born in Burton Upon Trent in Staffordshire, England, and now lives in London.

=== Career ===
Tom Wood has signed a book deal with Berkley Publishing Group (an imprint of Penguin Books) guaranteeing readers at least two more novels after 2016.

In 2020, Wood published a psychological thriller, A Knock at the Door (a non-Victor novel), under the pen-name T.W. Ellis.

== Bibliography ==
=== Victor the Assassin Series ===
Victor, as portrayed by the author, is a professional freelance assassin. He is very secretive, his real name and origins are mainly unknown.

Publication year	Storyline order	Title	ISBN	Note
2010	1	The Hunter	ISBN 978-0312558048	a.k.a. The Killer
2012	1.5	Bad Luck In Berlin	ISBN 978-1-101-61672-7	short story - ebook only
2011	2	The Enemy	ISBN 978-0751545357	
2018	2.5	Gone by Dawn	ISBN 978-0751556056	short story - ebook only
2013	3	The Game	ISBN 978-0751549171	
2014	4	Better Off Dead	ISBN 978-0751549195	a.k.a. No Tomorrow
2015	5	The Darkest Day	ISBN 978-0751556025	
2016	6	A Time To Die	ISBN 978-0751556049	
2017	7	The Final Hour	ISBN 978-0751570144	
2018	8	Kill For Me	ISBN 978-0751572476	
2021	9	A Quiet Man	ISBN 978-0751575965	
2022	10	Traitor	ISBN 978-0751584837	
2023	11	Blood Debt	ISBN 978-0751584868	
2024	12	Firefight	ISBN 978-0751584912	
2025	13	Unlucky For Some	ISBN 978-1408723463	

=== As T.W. Ellis ===
Publication year	Storyline order	Title	ISBN	Note
2020	1	A Knock at the Door	ISBN 978-0751575941	psychological thriller

=== As Sam Ripley ===
Publication year	Storyline order	Title	ISBN	Note
2023	1	The Rule of Three	ISBN 978-1398514973	

== TV Adaptations ==
In August 2024, it was announced that Max (formerly HBO Max) is developing a television series based on Tom Wood's Victor the Assassin novels. The series, titled The Assassin, is set to star Matthew Fox in the lead role.

== Influences ==
- The Lord of the Rings
