= Maurice Martenot =

French musician (1898–1980)

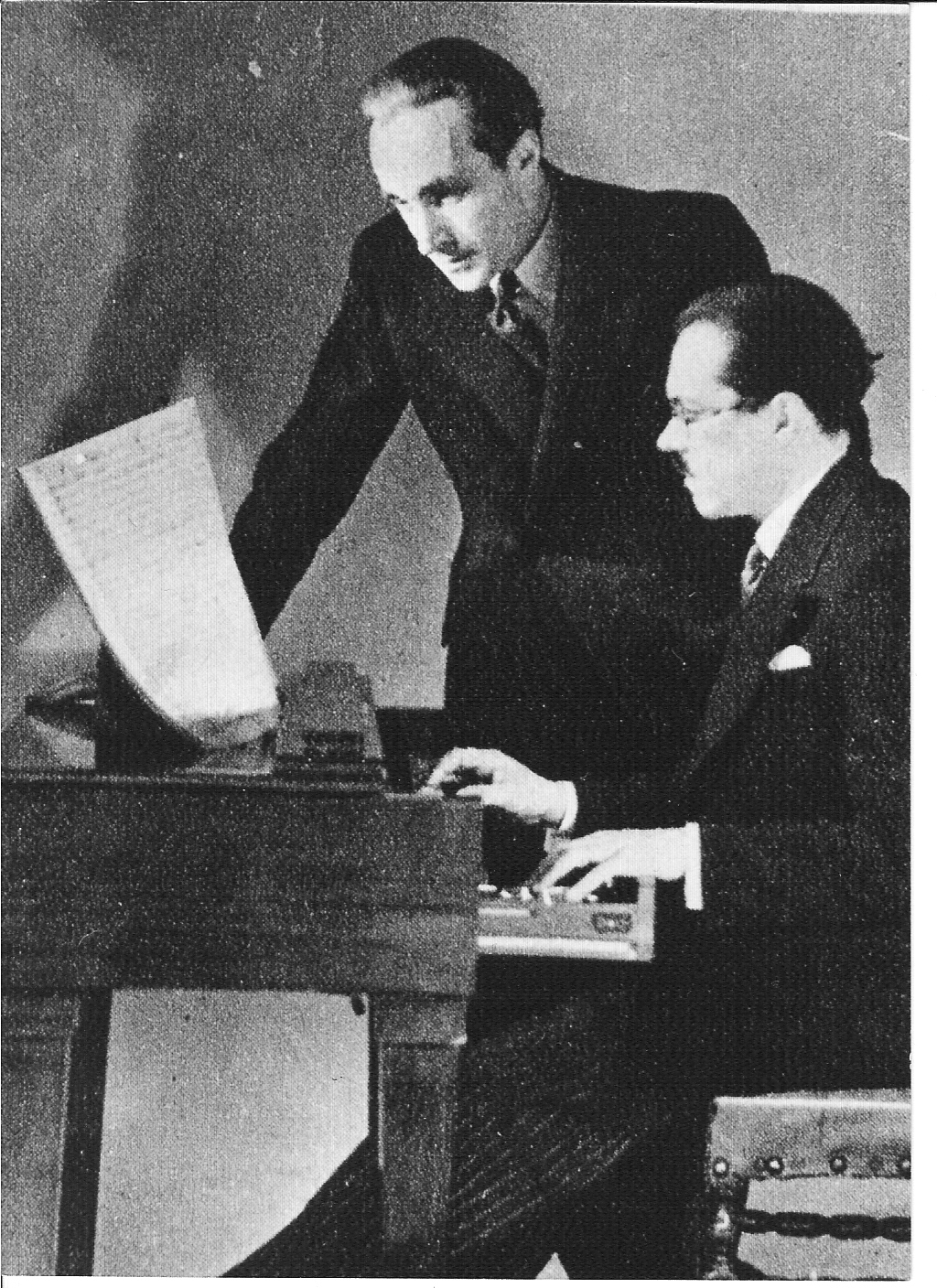
Pierre Vellones and Maurice Martenot

Maurice Louis Eugène Martenot (French: [mɔʁis maʁtəno]; October 14, 1898 – October 8, 1980) was a French cellist, a radio telegrapher during the first World War, and an inventor.

Born in Paris, he is best known for his invention of the ondes Martenot, an instrument he began working on in 1918, and first presented in 1928 in Paris. He spent decades improving on his initial design. He unveiled a microtonal model in 1938. He also was responsible for teaching the first generation of ondes Martenot performers, including Karel Goeyvaerts, Jeanne Loriod, Georges Savaria, Gilles Tremblay, and his sister Ginette Martenot.

Martenot himself performed as an "ondist" with the Philadelphia Orchestra under Leopold Stokowski in 1930. The 1937 World's Fair in Paris awarded him "Le Grand Prix de l'Exposition Mondiale." He taught at the Paris Conservatoire during the 1940s.

A Martenot biography, in French, has been written by ondist Jean Laurendeau. His invention of the ondes Martenot is the subject of the 2013 Quebec documentary Wavemakers, in which Laurendeau also appears.

== Bibliography ==
- Info.com
- Sadie, S. (ed.) (1980). The New Grove Dictionary of Music and Musicians [vol. # 11].
