= Manta Ray (film) =

- Film poster
- Directed by: Phuttiphong Aroonpheng
- Written by: Phuttiphong Aroonpheng
- Produced by: Mai Meksawan; Jakrawal Nilthamrong; Chatchai Chaiyon; Philippe Avril
- Starring: Wanlop Rungkamjad; Aphisit Hama; Rasmee Wayrana
- Cinematography: Nawarophaat Rungphiboonsophit
- Edited by: Lee Chatametikool; Harin Paesongthai
- Music by: Christine Ott; Mathieu Gabry
- Production companies: Diversion; Les Films de l'Étranger; Youku Pictures
- Distributed by: Jour2Fête
- Release date: 7 September 2018 (Venice Film Festival)
- Running time: 105 minutes
- Countries: Thailand; France; China

Manta Ray (Thai: กระเบนราหู; RTGS: Kraben Rahu) is a 2018 drama film written and directed by Phuttiphong Aroonpheng. It is Phuttiphong's first feature film, following his graduation from Digital Film Academy. The film had its world premiere at the 75th Venice International Film Festival on 7 September 2018 and received the award for the best movie in Orizzonti/ Horizon Prize selection. Phuttiphong also received the Silver Pyramid at the 40th Cairo International Film Festival. The film stars Aphisit Hama, Wanlop Rungkamjad and Rasmee Wayrana in lead roles. The film focuses on the political theme of Rohingyas in a poetic way. French composers Christine Ott and Mathieu Gabry, working as a duet under the name Snowdrops, created an original score for the movie and had been part in the sound design. Thai cutting-room ace Lee Chatametikool was also involved in the project.

== Cast ==
- Aphisit Hama as Thongchai
- Wanlop Rungkamjad as the fisherman
- Rasmee Wayrana as Saijai

== Production ==
Manta Ray is a continuation of Phuttiphong's 2015 short film Ferris Wheel, which also deals with migrant workers and the porous border between Thailand and neighbours. Phuttiphong began his work on Manta Ray in 2010, consecutively to Mae Sot, a border town in the north of Thailand populated by Thai and Myanmar people. His original script was called Departure Day and was in two parts: the first about a migrant worker from Myanmar who slips through the border into Thailand, and the second takes places in a fishing town and concerns the search for a true identity of a mysterious man. The first part became Ferris Wheel, and the second part Manta Ray.

== Release ==
After its premiere at the Venice Film Festival, the film screened at the 2018 Toronto International Film Festival, the 66th San Sebastián International Film Festival, Busan International Film Festival, Mumbai International Film Festival, Vancouver International Film Festival and in 2021 at the 74th Locarno Film Festival in the open doors screenings category.

== Awards ==
Manta Ray received the award for the best film in Orizzonti Horizon Prize selection in Venice and the Golden Gateway for best film in the International competition category in Mumbai.

Phuttiphong won the Silver Pyramid, also known as the Special Jury Prize for Best Director, at the 40th Cairo International Film Festival, tied with Ukrainian director Sergei Loznitsa for Donbass.
