= Fête des belles eaux =

1936 suite of incidental music by Olivier Messiaen

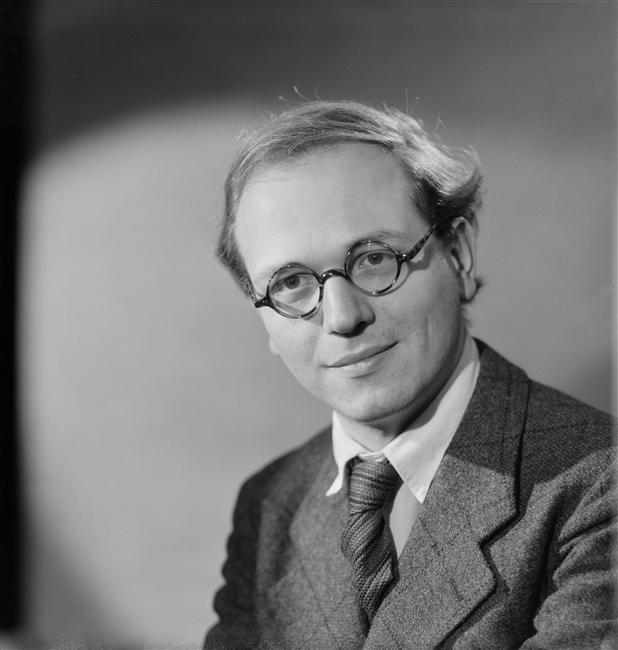
Olivier Messiaen in 1937

Fête des belles eaux (French: Festival of the beautiful waters) is a 1936 suite of incidental music by the French composer Olivier Messiaen. The suite, commissioned for the 1937 Paris Exposition, has eight movements, and was scored for six ondes Martenots. It was written to accompany the movements of the fountains and fireworks at the exposition.

The work remained unpublished until 2003, ten years after Messiaen's death, when it was issued by Éditions Alphonse Leduc.

== Structure ==
This composition is in eight movements and takes approximately thirty minutes to perform. The movements are as follows:

1. Premières fusées (First rockets)
2. L'eau (The water)
3. Les fusées (The rockets)
4. L'eau (The water)
5. Les fusées (The rockets)
6. L'eau (à son maximum de hauteur) (The water (at its maximum height))
7. Superposition de l'eau et des fusées (Superposition of the water and the rockets)
8. Feu d'artifice final (Firework finale)

The fourth movement was later rearranged for cello and piano as the fifth movement ("Louange à l'Éternité de Jésus") of Messiaen's Quatuor pour la fin du temps; elements of the movement were also incorporated into a discarded movement of Les corps glorieux entitled Vie pour Dieu des ressuscités.
