= Jeanne Loriod =

Jeanne Blanche Armande Loriod (13 July 1928 – 3 August 2001) was a French musician, regarded as the world's leading exponent of the ondes Martenot, an early electronic instrument.

Born in Houilles, Yvelines, she was the younger sister of Yvonne Loriod, the pianist and second wife of Olivier Messiaen. She performed all of Messiaen's works for ondes Martenot, most notably the Turangalîla-Symphonie, which she recorded six times. The work was not written for her, however, but for Ginette Martenot, the sister of its inventor Maurice.

Loriod's enormous repertoire included fourteen concertos, some three hundred works with concertante parts for ondes and another 250 chamber works. She also performed in numerous film soundtracks (including – perhaps most accessibly – the 1981 animated feature Heavy Metal), and published a definitive work on the instrument, the three-volume treatise Technique de l’onde electronique type Martenot (1987).

She suffered a stroke and drowned while swimming near Antibes on the French Riviera in August 2001.
