= Mondkopf =

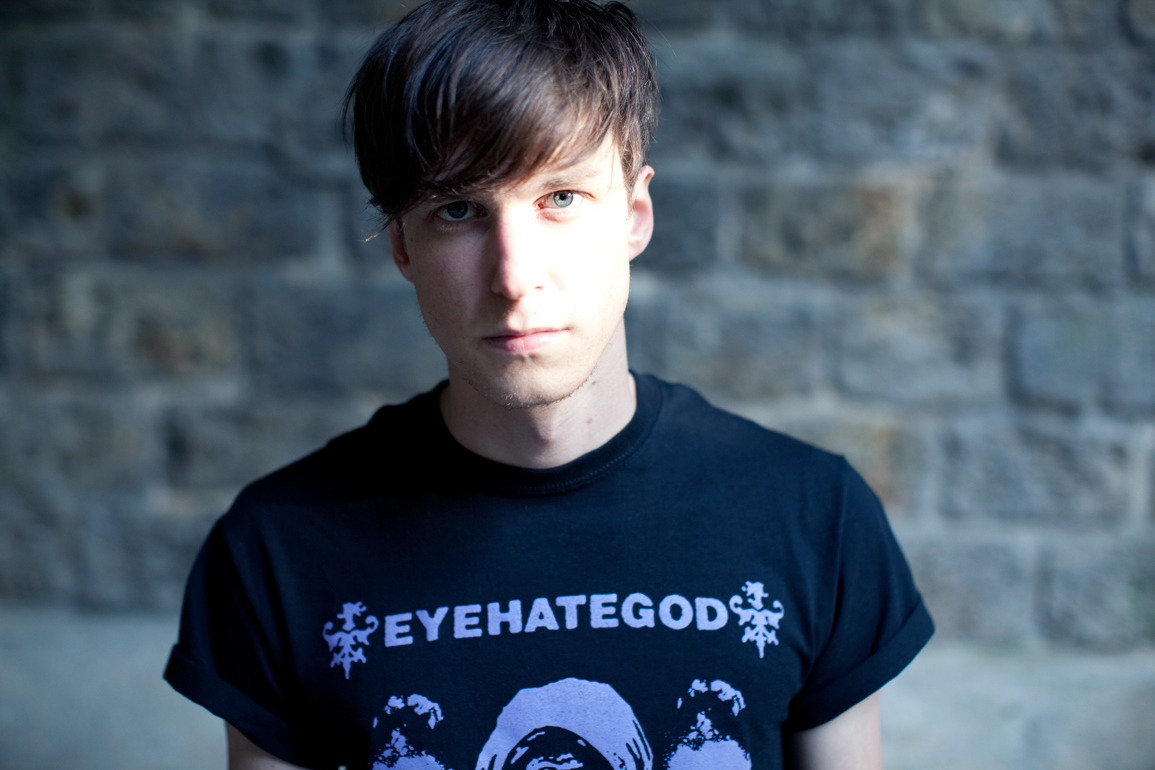

Background information
- Born: Paul Régimbeau; 1986 (age 38–39); Toulouse, France
- Genres: Electronic
- Occupation: Composer
- Years active: 2005–present

Mondkopf (born Paul Régimbeau, 1986 in Toulouse, France) is an electronic music composer.

== Career ==
=== Early years ===
His first album, Un été sur l'herbe, recorded in 2005–2006, came out in 2007 under the French label Annexia Records, followed by Galaxy of Nowhere (2009) on Asphalt Duchess and Rising Doom (2011) on Fool House. During that time, he also released a certain number of EPs : (Declaration of) Principles (2008) on Fool House, Nuits sauvages (2009) on Citizen Records, Libera me (2009) and Deaf House (2010) on Asphalt Duchess, as well as a limited edition of Day of Anger (2011).

At that point of his career, he had already performed live in several music festivals around Europe : Nuit Electro at the Grand Palais, Astropolis and Strøm (Copenhagen) in 2009, Transardentes and Solidays in 2010, The Great Escape Festival in May 2011, Vieilles Charrues Festival in July 2011, La Route du Rock in August 2011, Pitchfork Music Festival in October 2011...

His remixes were noticed by the specialized media, and also by musicians such as Agoria (musician), Busy P, Boys Noize, Patrice Baumel, Radio Slave, James Zabiela (who placed Bones Club in his Essential Mix on BBC1, and Libera me on his compilation for Renaissance Recordings), etc.

When asked about his pseudonym, he provided the following explanation : « People were saying that I always had my head in the clouds (« avoir la tête dans la lune » literally means « to have one's head in the moon ») and that I wasn’t able to concentrate. I finally came up with this german word (« Mondkopf » literally meaning « moon head »), I thought it sounded good and so I kept it ».

=== Since the creation of In Paradisum ===
In 2012, in collaboration with the visual collective Trafik, he created the ambient live "Eclipse" at the Cité de la Musique in Paris, on the occasion of a Brian Eno tribute party. Under his own record label In Paradisum, that he launched along with Guillaume Heuguet, he released the EPs Ease your pain and Ease your pain remixes. He started performing regularly during the label's events, dedicated to the underground techno and ambient international scene.

In 2013, in parallel with a couple of appearances in Berlin (at Berghain, at Boiler Room...), he collaborated with Perc Trax to release the EP The Nicest Way.

In 2014, his fourth album Hadès, released under In Paradisum, represents a « new start »: Mondkopf distances himself from pure techno in order to experiment sounds on « the most goth and doom side of the industrial scene » (according to a French journalist from Tsugi).

As he describes it himself, his musical approach follows a cathartic and redeeming logic, in a mental environment that is tinted with mysticism.

He continues to perform live on various occasions, among which was a unique collaboration with Charlemagne Palestine for the 2015 edition of the Sonic Protest festival. In February 2016, on In Paradisum, he released the EP The Last Tales, that he elaborated during the Hadès tour. He is currently working on several projects, either solo (Extreme Precautions) or involving other artists in the entourage of In Paradisum (Autrenoir, FOUDRE, Spero Lucem).
