= Phuttiphong Aroonpheng =

Thai film director (born 1976)

- พุทธิพงษ์ อรุณเพ็ง
- Born: 1976 (age 49–50); Bangkok, Thailand
- Education: Silpakorn University
- Occupation: Film director

Phuttiphong Aroonpheng (Thai: พุทธิพงษ์ อรุณเพ็ง; RTGS: Phutthiphong Arunpheng; born 1976) is a Thai film director. He also works extensively as cinematographer, with films such as A Voyage of Foreteller or Vanishing Point, and directed various short experimental films, such as A Tale of Heaven.

His 2018 feature debut, Manta Ray, received critical acclaim.

== Partial filmography ==
- Manta Ray (2018)
- Morrison (2023)
- The Burning Giants (2026)
