= Cédric Marszewski =

French DJ

Cédric Marszewski, also known as Pilooski, is a French DJ. He has toured numerous places (mainly France and Europe) and produced various styles of music ranging from drum and bass to hip hop. Pilooski has recorded as both an independent artist and with several record labels. He is best known for remixes of songs from the 1950s, 1960s and 1970s.

== Career ==
Cédric Marszewski started music as a sound designer for the French national radio station, Radio France. As a musician and producer, he later joined with Guillaume Sorge and Clovis Goux in the D*I*R*T*Y collective (both were formerly working as journalists for French TV Canal+ amongst other things). Together they released a music compilation (the Dirty Edits series) and The Dirty Space Disco for French label Tigersushi.

He created theme music for an Adidas advertisement, and remixed the Frankie Valli song "Beggin'". Another campaign used his remix of Dee Edwards' "Why Can't There Be Love?"; the remix of the song and the original song itself have gained widespread popularity ever since, as well as for the "Celebrating Originality on the Streets" campaign.

After the international release of his remix of "Why Can't There Be Love?", Pilooski's originality caught the attention of the online-downloads based audience, giving him the opportunity to encounter more publicity contracts, as well as keeping a stable position to be considered for further Adidas collaborations.

Pilooski has been working for fashion as music supervisor for brands such as Hermès (since 2010), Christophe Lemaire, Lanvin (alongside Guillaume Sorge), and Bonpoint. He has worked as a music supervisor or composer for Hermès perfume campaign, on various projects featuring Jarvis Cocker, Narumi (Tristesse Contemporaine), Mark Kerr, Baxter Dury, and French writer Simon Liberati, as well as composing the score for French-Lebanese director Joyce A. Nawashati's first full-length film Blind Sun.

As a producer, Pilooski has produced for Tristesse Contemporaine, Hypnolove, Perez, and Discodeine (one of his side projects). He has worked with Jarvis Cocker (Pulp), Baxter Dury, Matias Aguayo and Kevin Parker (Tame Impala).

== Style ==
Pilooski's style has been noted for its atypical standards. His beats and remarkable usage of diverse musical influences is reflected in both his original work and remixes or covers, in which he is able to preserve the spirit and sentiment of the original creations while impregnating his personal label upon the songs.

== Discography ==
Release	Label	Year
"Piloo" (7")	P Sounds	2002
"A Peu Près"	Diamond Traxx	2003
"Can't There Be Love" (12")	Diamond Traxx	2006
"A Digital Catastrophee" (12")	Omertà Registrazione	2007
"Love Is Wet" (10")	Astro Lab Recordings	2007
"Wctbl" (7")	Astro Lab Recordings	2008
Rvng of the Nrds Vol. 10	Rvng Intl.	2010
"Isola"	Dirty	2015
