= Loïc Lantoine =

French singer and songwriter

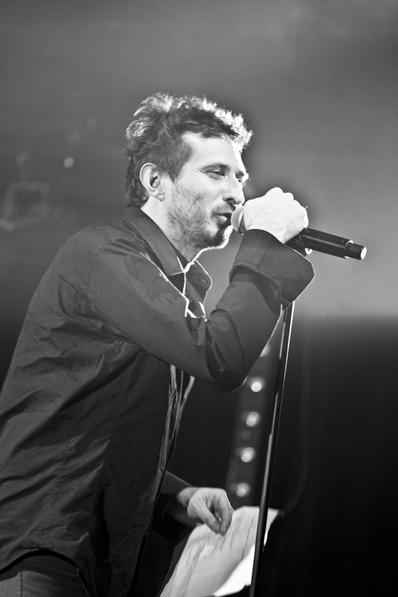
Loïc Lantoine performing live (2011)

Loïc Lantoine is a French singer and songwriter born in Armentières, Nord-Pas-de-Calais, France. He wrote songs for Jehan in Les ailes de Jehan and for Allain Leprest and in 2000 for the show Ne nous quittons plus. He also became part of formations La Rue Kétanou, he was a founder of Mon côté punk.

He was part of a duo with François Pierron, and then a quartet by including Eric Philippon and Joseph Doherty, and finally a quintet with the addition of Thomas Fiancette all under the name Les Loïc Lantoine.

In April 2013, he released his solo album J’ai changé.

== Discography ==
=== Albums ===
Solo

| Year | Albums | Peak positions |
| Year | Albums | FR |
|---|---|---|
| 2013 | J'ai changé | 93 |

as part of Les Loïc Lantoine

- 2004: Badaboum
- 2006: Tout est calme
- 2008: A l'attaque

as part of Mon côté punk

- 2004: J'y peux rien (EP)
- 2005: Mon côté punk

Collective albums

- 2010: Les étrangers familiers (Loic Lantoine & Éric Lareine)
- 2010: Ronchonchons et compagnie (Loic Lantoine, Juliette & Laurent Deschamps - written by Alexis HK & Liz Cherhal)
