= Ondes Martenot =

Early electronic musical instrument

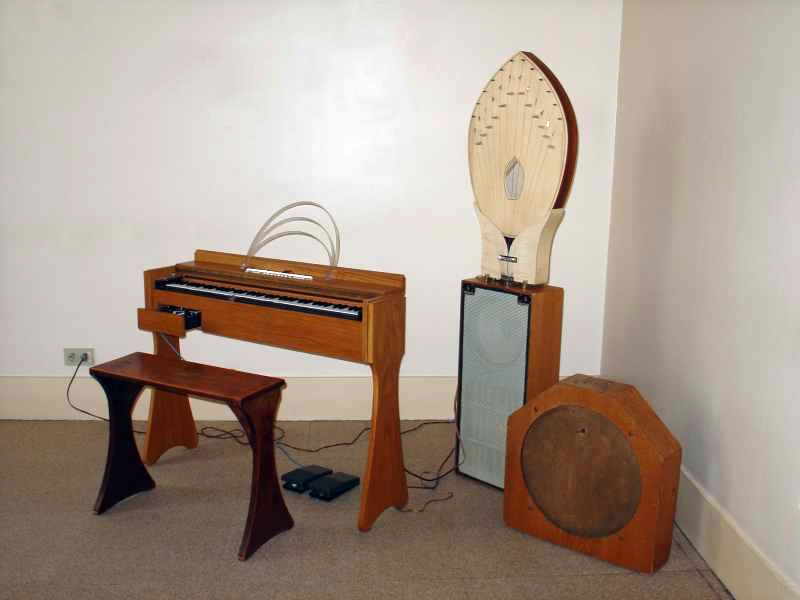
- An ondes Martenot (seventh generation model, 1975)
- Dates: 1928–present

Technical specifications
- Polyphony: none
- Oscillator: vacuum tube or transistor
- Synthesis type: heterodyne

Input/output
- Keyboard: Early models only used a wire controller with finger ring, later models added a 72-note rail-mounted keyboard capable of producing vibrato by lateral motion

The ondes Martenot (/ˈoʊnd mɑːrtəˈnoʊ/ OHND mar-tə-NOH; French: [ɔ̃d maʁtəno], lit. 'Martenot waves') or ondes musicales (lit. 'musical waves') is an early electronic musical instrument. Early models were played only by moving a ring tied to a wire, creating "wavering" sounds similar to a theremin, but a lateral-vibrato keyboard was soon added. Dynamics and timbre are adjusted using controls in a drawer on the instrument's left side. A player of the ondes Martenot is called an ondist.

The ondes Martenot was invented in 1928 by the French inventor Maurice Martenot. Martenot was inspired by the accidental overlaps of tones between military radio oscillators, and wanted to create an instrument with the expressiveness of the cello.

The ondes Martenot is used in more than 100 orchestral compositions. The French composer Olivier Messiaen used it in pieces such as his 1949 Turangalîla-symphonie, and his sister-in-law Jeanne Loriod was a celebrated player of the instrument. It appears in numerous film and television soundtracks, particularly science fiction and horror films. It has also been used by contemporary acts such as Daft Punk, Damon Albarn, and Radiohead guitarist and keyboardist Jonny Greenwood.

== History ==
The ondes Martenot (French for "Martenot waves") is one of the earliest electronic instruments, patented in the same year as another early electronic instrument, the theremin. It was invented in 1928 by the French cellist Maurice Martenot. Martenot had been a radio operator during World War I, and developed the ondes Martenot in an attempt to replicate the accidental overlaps of tones between military radio oscillators. He hoped to bring the musical expressivity of the cello to his new instrument. According to The Guardian, the ondes Martenot visually resembles a cross between an organ and a theremin.

Martenot first demonstrated the ondes Martenot on April 20, 1928, performing Dimitrios Levidis's Poème symphonique at the Paris Opera. He embarked on a number of performance tours to promote it, beginning in Europe before going to New York. In 1930, he performed with the Philadelphia Orchestra, after which he embarked on a world tour. In 1937, the ondes Martenot was displayed at the Exposition Internationale de Paris with concerts and demonstrations in an ensemble setting with up to twelve ondists performing together at a time. Beginning in 1947, the ondes Martenot was taught at the Paris Conservatory, with Martenot as the first teacher.

The earliest model of the ondes Martenot was similar to the Theremin. The second model of the instrument, demonstrated in 1928, lacked most of the features that are now associated with the instrument. It was played in a standing position by pulling on a wire connected to a wooden box. Over the following years, Martenot produced several new models, introducing a keyboard with the ability to produce vibrato by moving the keys laterally. According to Cynthia Millar, "[b]y the 1940s, the instrument had settled into what was to be, with minor variations, its final form." Instruments were manufactured to order, and "often differed according to the wishes of the player." Martenot was uninterested in mass-producing the ondes Martenot, which may have contributed to its decline in popularity following initial interest. Jean-Louis Martenot, Maurice Martenot's son, created new ondes Martenot models. In 2009, The Guardian reported that the last ondes Martenot was manufactured in 1988, but that a new model was being manufactured.

== Sounds and technique ==
A recording of the Ondomo, an instrument based on the ondes Martenot

The ondes Martenot is unique among electronic musical instruments in its methods of control. The ondes Martenot can be played with a metal ring worn on the right index finger. Sliding the ring along a wire produces "theremin-like" tones, generated by oscillator circuits using vacuum tubes, or transistors in the seventh model. A drawer allows manipulation of volume and timbre by the left hand. Volume is controlled with a touch sensitive glass "lozenge".

The third model, unveiled in 1929, had a non-functioning simulacrum of a keyboard below the wire to indicate pitch. This model also had a "black fingerguard" on a wire which could be used instead of the ring. It was held between the right thumb and index finger, which was played standing at a distance from the instrument. When played in this way, the drawer is removed from the instrument and placed on a bench next to the player. Maurice Martenot's pedagogical manual for the ondes Martenot, written in 1931, offers instruction on both methods of playing.

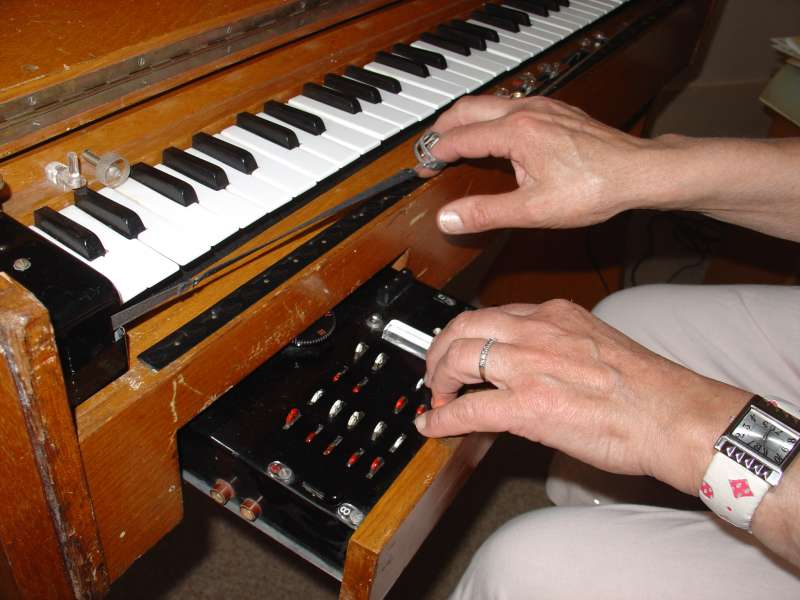
Au ruban playing technique

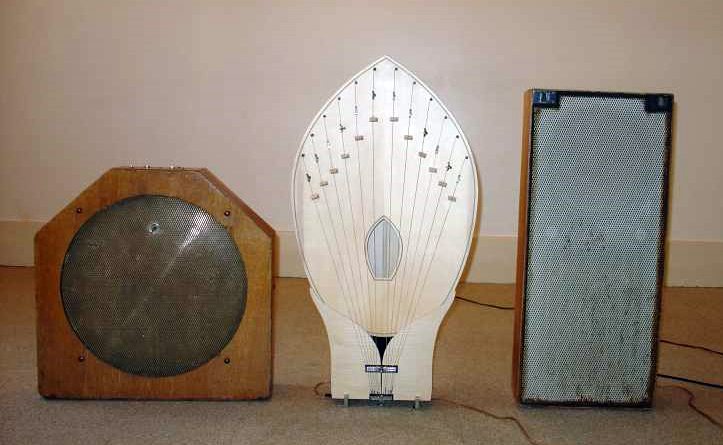
Diffuseurs from left: Métallique, Palme, and cabinet containing both Principal and Résonance

Later versions added a real functioning keyboard; the keys produce vibrato when moved from side to side. This was introduced in the 1930s with the 84-key fourth version of the instrument. Subsequent versions had 72 keys. Combined with a switch that transposes the pitch by one octave, these instruments have a range from C_{1} to C_{8}.

Early models can produce only a few waveforms. Later models can simultaneously generate sine, peak-limited triangle, square, pulse, and full-wave rectified sine waves, in addition to pink noise, all controlled by switches in the drawer. The square wave and full-wave rectified sine wave can be further adjusted by sliders in the drawer. On the Seventh model, a dial at the top of the drawer adjusts the balance between white noise and the other waveforms. A second dial adjusts the balance between the three speakers. A switch chooses between the keyboard and ribbon.

Further adjustments can be made using controls in the body of the instrument. These include several dials for tuning the pitch, a dial for adjusting the overall volume, a switch to transpose the pitch by one octave, and a switch to activate a filter. The drawer of the seventh model also includes six transposition buttons, which change the pitch by different intervals. These can be combined to immediately raise the pitch by up to a minor ninth.

Martenot produced four speakers, called diffuseurs, for the instrument. The Métallique features a gong instead of a speaker cone, producing a metallic timbre. It was used by the first ondes Martenot quartets in 1932. Another, the Palme speaker, has a resonance chamber laced with strings tuned to all 12 semitones of an octave; when a note is played in tune, it resonates a particular string, producing chiming tones. It was first presented alongside the sixth version of the ondes Martenot in 1950.

According to The Guardian, the ondes Martenot "can be as soothing and moving as a string quartet, but nerve-jangling when gleefully abused". Greenwood described it as "a very accurate theremin that you have far more control of ... When it's played well, you can really emulate the voice." The New York Times described its sound as a "haunting wail". Messiaen, discussing its sonic capabilities, describes “an extraterrestrial, enchanted voice", “a cracked bell”, and "a crumbling pile of sand.”

== Use ==
=== Classical music ===
The ondes Martenot's popularity was originally owed to its usage in various classical compositions, most notably by the French composer Olivier Messiaen. Although he did not employ it very often, he is the composer most associated with the instrument. Messiaen first used it (six of them, in fact) in Fête des belles eaux, a 1936-1937 suite of incidental music for the Exposition Internationale des Arts et Techniques dans la Vie Moderne. He went on to use it in several more works: Deux monodies en quarts de ton (1938), Musique de scène pour un Œdipe (1942; these two were written for solo onde Martenot), Trois Petites Liturgies de la présence divine (1943-1944; solo part) and Saint François d'Assise (1975-1983; three ondes as part of the orchestra). The most famous of the works to use one, however, was his Turangalîla-Symphonie. In Turangalìla, Messiaen used it to create "shimmering, swooping musical effects". This symphony featured the ondes Martenot and piano as soloists against the backdrop of a large orchestra. It is widely renowned as a masterpiece, and its fame associated the instrument with Messiaen. Messiaen's widow, Yvonne Loriod, arranged and edited four unpublished Feuillets inédits for ondes Martenot and piano (originally for voice and piano) which were published in 2001.

Other composers who used the instrument include Arthur Honegger, Claude Vivier, Darius Milhaud, Edgard Varèse, Marcel Landowski, Charles Koechlin, Florent Schmitt, Matyas Seiber, and Jacques Ibert. Honegger's most notable work including the ondes Martenot was his dramatic oratorio, Jeanne d'Arc au bûcher in 1935, in which the ondes Martenot's unique sonority was used to augment the string section. Milhaud, who also enjoyed the unusual nature of the ondes Martenot, used it several times in the 1930s for incidental music. Varèse did not use the ondes Martenot often, but it did appear in the premiere of Amériques in Paris; he also replaced the theremin parts of his Ecuatorial with ondes Martenot.

According to The New York Times, the ondes' most celebrated performer was the French musician Jeanne Loriod (1928–2001), who studied under Martenot at the Paris Conservatory. She performed internationally in more than 500 works, created 85 works for a sextet of ondes she formed in 1974, and wrote a three-volume book on the instrument, Technique de l'Onde Electronique Type Martenot. A British pupil of Loriod, John Morton (1931-2014) from Darlington, performed his own ondes instrument in works by Messiaen, Milhaud, Honegger and Bartok amongst others at the Royal Albert Hall and elsewhere in the 1970s, as well as on television and radio.

English composer Hugh Davies estimated that more than 1,000 works had been composed for the ondes. Loriod estimated that there were 15 concerti and 300 pieces of chamber music. The instrument was also popular in French theatres such as the Comédie-Française, the Théâtre National Populaire and the Folies Bergère.

Thomas Adès's opera The Exterminating Angel makes extensive use of the ondes Martenot, which Adès says "could be considered the voice of the exterminating angel".

=== Popular music ===
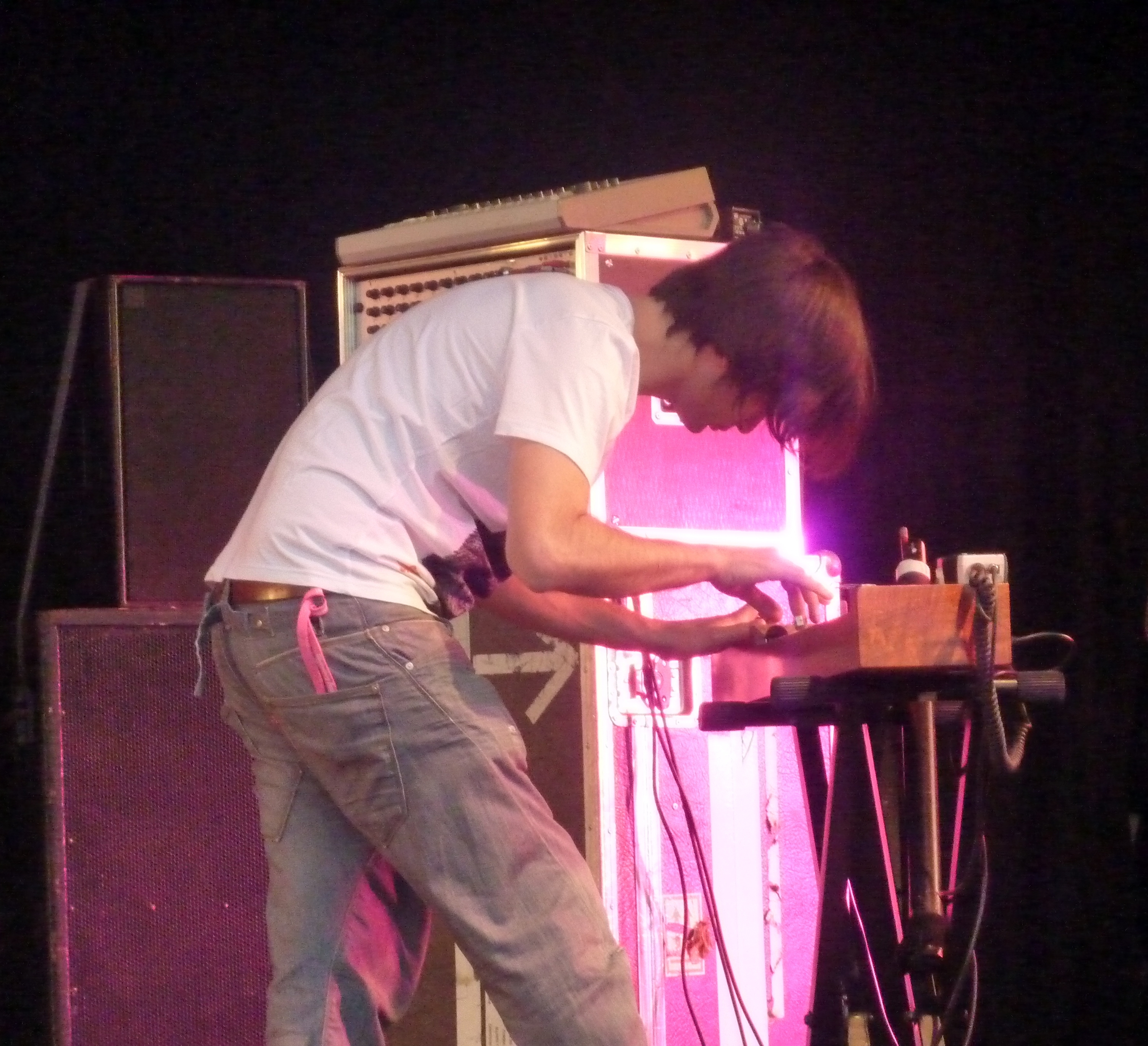
Jonny Greenwood playing an ondes Martenot in 2010

The Guardian described Jonny Greenwood of the English rock band Radiohead as a "champion" of the ondes Martenot. He first used it on Radiohead's 2000 album Kid A, and it appears in Radiohead songs including "The National Anthem", "How to Disappear Completely" and "Where I End and You Begin". Radiohead have performed versions of their songs "How to Disappear Completely", "Pyramid Song", and "Weird Fishes / Arpeggi" using several ondes Martenots. On their 2001 album Amnesiac, they used the ondes martenot palm speaker to add a "halo of hazy reverberance" to Thom Yorke's vocals on the song "You and Whose Army?". Greenwood composed a piece for two ondes Martenots, Smear, in 2011.

The ondist Thomas Bloch toured in Tom Waits and Robert Wilson's show The Black Rider (2004–06) and in Damon Albarn's opera "Monkey: Journey to the West" (2007–2013). Bloch performed ondes Martenot on the 2009 Richard Hawley album Truelove's Gutter and the 2013 Daft Punk album Random Access Memories. In 2020, the French composer Christine Ott released Chimères (pour Ondes Martenot), an avant-garde album using only the ondes Martenot.

=== Film and television ===
The ondes Martenot has featured in many films, particularly science fiction and horror films. In 1934 Arthur Honegger used the ondes Martenot in his soundtrack for the 1932 French animated film The Idea (French: 'L'Idée') by Austro-Hungarian filmmaker Berthold Bartosch, believed to be the first use of electronic music in film. In 1936 Adolphe Borchard used it in Sacha Guitry's Le roman d'un tricheur, played by Martenot's sister, Ginette. It was used by composer Brian Easdale in the ballet music for The Red Shoes.

French composer Maurice Jarre introduced the ondes Martenot to American cinema in his score for Lawrence of Arabia (1962). Composer Harry Lubin created cues for The Loretta Young Show, One Step Beyond and The Outer Limits featured the instrument, as did the first-season Lost in Space (1965) theme by John Williams. The English composer Richard Rodney Bennett used it for scores for films including Billion Dollar Brain (1967) and Secret Ceremony (1968). Elmer Bernstein learned about the ondes Martenot through Bennett, and used it in scores for films including Heavy Metal, Ghostbusters, The Black Cauldron, Legal Eagles, The Good Son, and My Left Foot.

The composer Danny Elfman used the ondes Martenot in the soundtrack to the comedy science fiction film Mars Attacks! He originally intended to use a theremin, but was unable to find a musician who could play one. The director Lucille Hadžihalilović used the ondes Martenot in her film Evolution (2015) as it "brings a certain melancholy, almost a human voice, and it instantly creates a particular atmosphere". Other film scores that use the ondes Martenot include A Passage to India, Amelie, Bodysong, There Will Be Blood (2007), Hugo (2011) and Manta Ray.

The ondes Martenot is the subject of the 2013 Quebec documentary Wavemakers. It is used in a performance of the fourth movement of Messiaen's Fête des belles eaux in an episode from the third season of the Amazon series Mozart in the Jungle, where a musician plays the ondes Martenot to inmates on Rikers Island (with piano accompaniment substituting the three other ondes). The English composer Barry Gray studied the ondes Martenot with Martenot in Paris, and used it in his soundtracks for 1960s films including Fahrenheit 451, Dr. Who and the Daleks and Journey to the Far Side of the Sun. The ondes Martenot is sometimes said to have been used in the original Star Trek theme; the part was in fact performed by a singer.

== Legacy ==
In 2001, the New York Times described the ondes, along with other early electronic instruments such as the theremin, telharmonium, trautonium, and orgatron, as part of a "futuristic electric music movement that never went remotely as far as its pioneers dreamed ... proponents of the new wired music delighted in making previously unimaginable noises". The French classical musician Thomas Bloch said: "The ondes martenot is probably the most musical of all electric instruments ... Martenot was not only interested in sounds. He wanted to use electricity to increase and control the expression, the musicality. Everything is made by the musician in real time, including the control of the vibrato, the intensity, and the attack. It is an important step in our electronic instrument lineage."

According to music journalist Alex Ross, fewer than 100 people had mastered the ondes Martenot as of 2001. In 1997, Mark Singer wrote for The Wire that it would likely remain obscure: "The fact is that any instrument with no institutional grounding of second- and third-raters, no spectral army of amateurs, will wither and vanish: how can it not? Specialist virtuosos may arrive to tackle the one-off novelty ... but there's no meaningful level of entry at the ground floor, and, what's worse, no fallback possibility of rank careerism if things don't turn out."

The ondes Martenot's electronics are fragile, and it includes a powder which transfers electric currents, which Martenot would mix in different quantities according to musicians' specifications; the precise proportions are unknown. Attempts to construct new ondes Martenot models using Martenot's original specifications have had variable results.

Several instruments have taken inspiration from elements of the ondes Martenot. In the 1930s, Frenchman Georges Jenny took inspiration from the Martenot's vibrato keyboard to create the Ondioline as a low-cost alternative to the Martenot. The Yamaha GX-1 synthesiser, released in the 1970s, featured two lateral-vibrato keyboard manuals inspired by the Martenot. In 2000, Jonny Greenwood of the English rock band Radiohead commissioned the synthesiser company Analogue Systems to develop a replica of the ondes Martenot, as he was nervous about damaging his instrument on tour. The replica, called the French Connection, imitates the ondes Martenot's control mechanism, but does not generate sound; instead, it controls an external oscillator. In 2012, the Canadian company Therevox began selling a synthesizer with an interface based on the ondes Martenot pitch ring and intensity key.

There have also been more thorough replicas of the ondes Martenot. A replica called Ondéa was created by Ambro Oliva in the early-2000s. It went out of production in 2011 due to bankruptcy, but was still in use by professional Ondists in 2018. In 2011 Sound on Sound wrote that original ondes Martenot models were "all but impossible to obtain or afford, and unless you can stump up 12,000 Euros for one of Jean‑Loup Dierstein's new reproduction instruments, the dream of owning a real Ondes is likely to remain such". In 2016, David Kean of Audities Studios began producing a new version of the Ondéa, after obtaining the original design from Ambro Oliva in circa-2012. In 2017, the Japanese company Asaden manufactured 100 Ondomo instruments, a portable version of the ondes Martenot.

In 2025, American musician Joe Edelmann announced GreenWaves, an inspired replica of the Ondes Martenot developed under the IdioTech Team. The instrument features several modern capabilities, including MIDI control, both to control the device with an external controller or to use it as a controller for another device, waveform manipulation, built-in effects, intelligent harmonization, and preset storage. Edelmann also announced that GreenWaves would receive regular updates to its I/O system.
