= List of compositions by Olivier Messiaen =

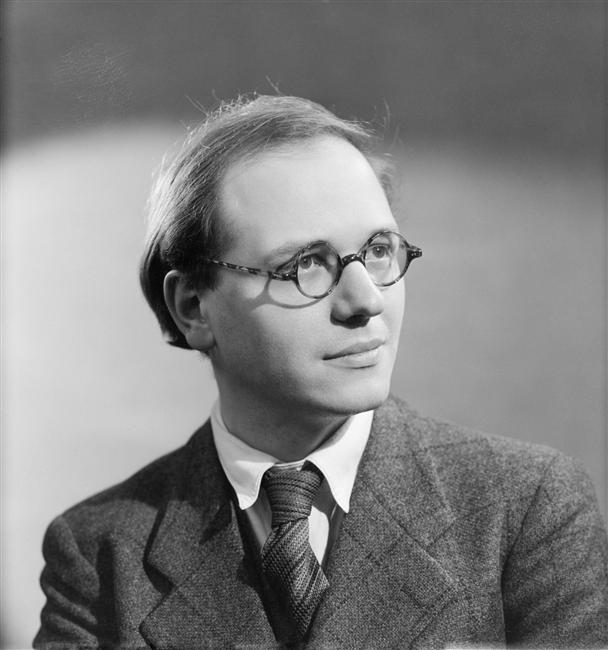
Messiaen (1937)

This is a list of compositions by Olivier Messiaen. Works are listed initially by genre and can be sorted chronologically by clicking on the "Date" header.

Messiaen's compositions include works for chamber ensemble, orchestra, vocal music, music for piano and organ, as well as some of the earliest electronic music, with his use of the ondes Martenot in several of his compositions. Messiaen's work is characterised by rhythmic complexity, his interest in ornithology and birdcalls, and his system of modes of limited transposition.

== List of compositions ==
Title	Scoring	Date	Notes
=== Stage ===			
Saint François d'Assise (Saint Francis of Assisi) opera in 3 acts	soprano, 3 tenors, 4 baritones, and bass soloists, chorus, and orchestra	1975–83	libretto by Messiaen
=== Orchestral ===			
Fugue en ré mineur (Fugue in D minor)	orchestra	1928	lost
Le Banquet eucharistique (The Eucharistic Banquet)	orchestra	1928	premiere Jan. 1930; unpublished; portions recomposed for organ as Le banquet céleste in 1928 and Offrande au Saint-Sacrement in 1929
Jésus – Poème symphonique (Jesus – symphonic poem)	orchestra	1928	lost
Simple chant d'une âme (Simple Song of a Soul)	orchestra	1930	lost
Les Offrandes oubliées – Méditation symphonique (The Forgotten Offerings – Symphonic Meditation)	orchestra	1930	premiere 1931; arr. for piano solo in 1931
Le Tombeau resplendissant (The Resplendent Tomb)	orchestra	1931	published 1997
Hymne au Saint-Sacrement (Hymn to the Holy Sacrament)	orchestra	1932	lost in 1942, Messiaen reconstructed it from memory in 1946, published as Hymn
L'Ascension – quatre méditations symphoniques pour orchestre (The Ascension – four symphonic meditations for orchestra)	orchestra	1932–33	mvts 1, 2, and 4 arr. for organ with a new 3rd mvt in 1933–34
Chronochromie (Time-Color)	orchestra	1959–60	premiere 1960
Et exspecto resurrectionem mortuorum (And I Await the Resurrection of the Dead)	34 winds & brass, 3 percussion	1964	premiere 1965
Un sourire (A Smile)	orchestra	1989	commissioned for the bicentenary of the death of Wolfgang Amadeus Mozart; premiere 1990
Éclairs sur l'Au-Delà... (Lightning over the Beyond...)	orchestra	1987–91	flute solo in 7th mvt from Sigle; premiered by the New York Philharmonic, Zubin Mehta conducting, in November 1992
Un oiseau des arbres de vie (Oiseau tui) (A Bird of the Trees of Life (Tūī Bird))	orchestra	1987–91	discarded 3rd mvt from Éclairs sur l'au-delà (in between the existing 2nd & 3rd mvts); manuscript in piano sketch with orchestration annotations discovered among Messiaen's papers; orchestrated by Christopher Dingle and first performed at the BBC Proms in August 2015
=== Concertante ===			
Trois Tâla ("Three Tâla")	piano and orchestra	1946–48	used in Turangalîla-Symphonie (movements 3-5)
Turangalîla-Symphonie ("Turangalîla Symphony")	piano and ondes Martenot soloists, and orchestra	1946–48	revised 1990 (published 1994); premiere 1949
Réveil des oiseaux (Awakening of the Birds)	solo piano and orchestra	1953	revised 1988 (published 1999); premiere 1953
Oiseaux exotiques ("Exotic Birds")	solo piano, and 11 winds, 7 percussion	1955–56	revised 1985 (published 1995); premiere 1956
Concert des garrigues – sur les oiseaux de l'Hérault ("Garrigues Concerto – on the birds of Hérault")	piano and orchestra	1958–62	written as an homage to Debussy; ms in piano score, complete but without orchestration, ms discarded and music rewritten as Sept haïkaï after the composer's visit to Japan; ms reconstructed and edited as a solo piano piece as Fauvettes de l'Hérault – Concert des garrigues ("Warblers of Herault – Garrigues Concerto") by Roger Muraro, and first performed by him in Tokyo June 2017
Sept haïkaï – Esquisses japonaisses ("Seven Haikus – Japanese Sketches")	solo piano, and 8 violins, 13 winds, 6 percussion	1962	
Couleurs de la Cité céleste ("Colours of the Celestial City")	solo piano, and 3 clarinets, 10 brass, 6 percussion	1963	
Des Canyons aux étoiles... (From the Canyons to the Stars...)	piano, horn, glockenspiel, and xylorimba soloists, and small orchestra with 13 string players	1971–74	6th mvt is horn piece Le tombeau de Jean-Pierre Guezec
Un vitrail et des oiseaux ("A Stained-Glass Window and Birds")	piano solo, and 17 winds & brass, 8 percussion	1987	
La Ville d'En-Haut ("The City on High")	piano solo, and 31 winds & brass, 8 percussion	1987	
Concert à quatre ("Quadruple Concerto")	piano, cello, flute, and oboe soloists, and orchestra	1991–92	2nd mvt is arr. of soprano & piano piece Vocalise-Étude; 5th mvt (a five-voice fugue) never written and portions of orchestration not completed due to the composer's declining health; 2nd half of 1st mvt and all of 4th mvt orchestrated by Yvonne Loriod, George Benjamin, and Heinz Holliger, premiered in 1994, published in 2003
=== Choral ===			
La Sainte-Bohème (The Holy Bohemian); Text: Théodore de Banville from Odes funambulesques	mixed chorus and orchestra	1930	composed for the Prix de Rome; unpublished
L'Ensorceleuse (The Sorceress) cantata	soprano, tenor, bass, and piano or orchestra	1931	premiere 1931; unpublished
La Jeunesse des vieux (The Youth of the Old); Poem: Catulle Mendés	chorus and orchestra	1931	composed for the Prix de Rome; unpublished
Messe (Mass)	8 sopranos, and 4 violins	1933–34	unpublished; copyrighted in 1953
Poèmes pour Mi (Poems for Mi) song cycle	soprano and orchestra	1937	arr. of soprano and piano work
O sacrum convivium! ("Oh Sacred Banquet!") motet	SATB chorus and organ	1937	organ accomp. optional
Choeurs pour une Jeanne d'Arc ("Chorales for Joan of Arc"): 1. Te Deum; 2. Impropères	chorus	1941	premiere 1941; unpublished,
Trois petites liturgies de la présence divine (Three Small Liturgies of the Divine Presence)	36 women's voices, piano solo, ondes Martenot solo, and strings, percussion	1943–44	revised 1952, 1990
Chant des déportés (Song of the Deportees)	large ST chorus and orchestra	1945	believed lost until discovered in 1991
Cinq rechants (Five Re-chants)	3 sopranos, 3 altos, 3 tenors, 3 basses	1948	
La Transfiguration de Notre Seigneur Jésus-Christ ("The Transfiguration of Our Lord Jesus Christ")	large 100-voice 10-part chorus, piano, cello, flute, clarinet, xylophone, vibraphone, and marimba soloists, and large orchestra	1965–69	premiere 1969
=== Songs ===			
Deux ballades de Villon (Two Ballads of Villon): 1. "Épître à ses amis" 2. "Ballade des pendus"	voice and piano	1921	unpublished
Trois mélodies (Three Melodies) song cycle: 1. "Pourquoi ?"; 2. "Le sourire" 3. "La fiancée perdue"	soprano and piano	1930	
La Mort du nombre (Death of the Number)	soprano, tenor, violin, and piano	1930	
Leçons de solfège à chanter (Solfege Singing Lessons) 5 wordless pieces	high voice and piano	1934	published 2001; originally part of an anthology series
Vocalise-Étude ("Vocalisation Study")	soprano and piano	1935	orchestrated as 2nd mvt of Concert à quatre in 1991
Poèmes pour Mi (Poems for Mi) song cycle	soprano and piano	1936	orchestrated in 1937
Chants de Terre et de Ciel (Songs of Earth and Heaven) song cycle	soprano and piano	1938	
Harawi : Chants d'amour et de mort (Harawi: Songs of Love and Death) song cycle	soprano and piano	1945	5th mvt is arr. of oboe and piano Pièce
=== Chamber ===			
Adagio	organ, violin, cello	1927	lost
Andantino	string quartet	1926–27	lost
Thème et variations (Theme and Variations)	violin and piano	1932	
Fantaisie ("Fantasia")	violin and piano	1933	premiere 1935; discovered and published 2007
Quatuor pour la fin du Temps ("Quartet for the End of Time")	violin, cello, clarinet, and piano	1940-41	5th mvt is arr. of 4th mvt of Fête des belles eaux, 8th mvt is arr. of 2nd mvt of Diptyque
Pièce ("Piece")	oboe and piano	1945	written as a test piece for the oboe concours at the Paris Conservatoire, premiere 1945; unpublished; arr. for soprano and piano as 5th mvt of Harawi
Le Merle noir (The Blackbird)	flute and piano	1952	
Le Tombeau de Jean-Pierre Guézec ("The Tomb of Jean-Pierre Guézec")	horn solo	1971	premiere 1971; unpublished; revised and expanded as 6th mvt of Des canyons aux étoiles...
Sigle ("Acronym")	flute solo	1982	premiere 1982; unpublished; later used in the 7th mvt of Éclairs sur l'au-delà
Chant dans le style Mozart ("Song in the Style of Mozart")	clarinet and piano	1986	written for Conservatoire de Paris clarinet examinations, premiere 1986; unpublished, but recorded by Yvonne Loriod and Guy Deplus in 1999
Pièce pour piano et quatuor à cordes ("Piece for Piano and String Quartet")	piano quintet	1991	
Feuillets inédits ("Unpublished Leaves"); 4 pieces	piano and ondes Martenot	c. 1934-7	originally pedagogical works for voice and piano, 2 unfinished, compiled and arranged by Yvonne Loriod, published in 2001
=== Organ ===			
Esquisse modale ("Modal Sketch")	organ	1927	unpublished
Pièce pour orgue sur un thème de Laparra ("Piece for Organ on a Theme of Laparra")	organ	1927	lost
Prélude ("Prelude")	organ	unknown, probably around 1928	discovered 1997, published 2002
Variations écossaises ("Scottish Variations")	organ	1928	unpublished
Le Banquet Céleste (The Heavenly Banquet)	organ	1928	a recomposition of a section from the unpublished orchestra work Le banquet eucharistique; revised 1960
L'Hôte aimable des âmes ("The Kind Host of Souls")	organ	1928	unpublished
Offrande au Saint Sacrement (Offering to the Holy Sacrament)	organ	1929	a recomposition of a section from the unpublished orchestral piece Le banquet eucharistique; published 2001
Prélude en trio sur un thème de Haydn ("Prelude and Trio on a Theme of Haydn")	organ	1929	lost
Diptyque: Essai sur la vie terrestre et l'éternité bienheureuse ("Diptych: Essay on earthly life and blessed eternity")	organ	1929–30	2nd section arr. as 8th mvt of Quatuor pour la fin du temps in 1940
Apparition de l'église éternelle ("Apparition of the Eternal Church")	organ	1932	revised 1985 (registrations added)
L'Ascension ("The Ascension"): 1. Majesté du Christ demandant sa gloire à son Père ("Christ's majesty, asking His Father for His glory"); 2. Alleluias sereins d'une âme qui désire le ciel ("Serene alleluias of a soul who longs for heaven"); 3. Transports de joie d'une âme devant la gloire du Christ qui est la sienne ("Outbursts of Joy of a soul before Christ's Majesty, which is in itself Glorious"); 4. Prière du Christ montant vers son Père ("Christ's Prayer as He ascends towards His Father")	organ	1933–34	mvts 1, 2, and 4 arr. from the orchestra work, 3rd mvt is new
La Nativité du Seigneur ("The Lord's Nativity"): 1. La Vierge et l'enfant ("The Virgin and Child"); 2. Les Bergers ("The Shepherds"); 3. Desseins éternels ("Eternal Designs"); 4. Le Verbe ("The Word"); 5. Les Enfants de Dieu ("The Children of God"); 6. Les Anges ("The Angels"); 7. Jésus accepte la souffrance ("Jesus accepts suffering"); 8. Les Mages ("The Magi"); 9. Dieu parmi nous ("The Lord Amidst Us")	organ	1935	
Les Corps glorieux ("The Glorious Bodies"): 1. Subtilité des Corps Glorieux ("Subtlety of the Glorious Bodies"); 2. Les eaux de la Grâce ("The Fountains of Grace"); 3. L'ange aux parfums ("The Angel of Perfumes"); 4. Combat de Mort et de la Vie ("Battle of Life and Death"); 5. Force et agilité des Corps Glorieux ("Strength and Agility of the Glorious Bodies"); 6. Joie et clarté des Corps Glorieux ("Joy and Clarity of the Glorious Bodies"); 7. Le Mystère de la Sainte-Trinité ("The Mystery of the Holy Trinity")	organ	1939	
Tristan et Yseult – Thème d'Amour ("Tristan and Isolde – Love Theme")	organ	1945	written for a play, premiere 1945; used as the thème d'amour in Harawi and Turangalîla (transposed)
Messe de la Pentecôte (Pentecost Mass): 1. Entrée (Les langues de feu) – Entrance; 2. Offertoire (Les choses visibles et invisibles) – Offertory; 3. Consécration (Le don de Sagesse) – Consecration; 4. Communion (Les oiseaux et les sources) – Communion; 5. Sortie (Le vent de l'Esprit) – Recessional	organ	1951	
Livre d'orgue (Organ Book)	organ	1951–52	
Verset pour la fête de la Dédicace ("Verse for the Dedication Ceremony")	organ	1960	
Monodie (Monody)	organ or harmonium	1963	premiere 1998
Méditations sur le Mystère de la Sainte Trinité ("Meditations on the Mystery of the Holy Trinity")	organ	1967–69	
Livre du Saint-Sacrement (Book of the Holy Sacrament)	organ	1984	
=== Piano ===			
La Dame de Shalott (based on "The Lady of Shalott")	piano	1917	unpublished, but recorded by Yvonne Loriod transcribed in 2022
La Tristesse d'un grand ciel blanc ("The Sadness of a Great White Sky")	piano	1925	unpublished
Huit Préludes ("Eight Preludes")	piano	1928–29	revised 1945
Les Offrandes oubliées ("The Forgotten Offerings")	piano	1931	arr. of orchestra work
Fantaisie burlesque ("Burlesque Fantasia")	piano	1932	
Morceau (au première piste) de lecture à vue ("Piece (on the First Course) for Sight-Reading")	piano	1934	exercise written for piano examinations at the École Normale de Musique
Pièce pour le tombeau de Paul Dukas ("Piece for the Tomb of Paul Dukas")	piano	1935	published in 1936 as a musical supplement to La Revue musicale, republished 1996
Visions de l'Amen ("Visions of the Amen")	2 pianos	1943	
Rondeau	piano	1943	
Vingt Regards sur l'enfant-Jésus ("Twenty Contemplations of the Christ-Child")	piano	1944	
Cantéyodjayâ	piano	1948	
Quatre Études de rythme ("Four Rhythmic Etudes"): 1. Île de feu 1; 2. Mode de valeurs et d'intensités 3. Neumes rhythmiques 4. Île de feu 2	piano	1949–50	intended as a set but each piece initially published separately, published as a set in 2008
Catalogue d'oiseaux ("Catalogue of the Birds") Book 1: 1. Le Chocard des alpes ("Alpine Chough"); 2. Le Loriot ("Golden Oriole"); 3. Le Merle bleu ("Blue Rock Thrush"); Book 2: 4. Le Traquet stapazin ("Black-Eared Wheatear"); Book 3: 5. La Chouette hulotte ("Tawny Owl"); 6. L'Alouette lulu ("Woodlark"); Book 4: 7. La Rousserolle effarvatte ("Reed Warbler"); Book 5: 8. L'Alouette calandrelle ("Greater Short-Toed Lark"); 9. La Bouscarle ("Cetti's Warbler"); Book 6: 10. Le Merle de roche ("Rock Thrush"); Book 7: 11. La Buse variable ("Buzzard"); 12. Le Traquet rieur ("Black Wheatear"); 13. Le Courlis cendré ("Curlew")	piano	1956–58	2. loriot and Loriod are homophones
La Fauvette passerinette ("Subalpine Warbler")	piano	1961	a birdsong piece possibly intended for Book 8 (perhaps for a larger sequel) of Catalogue d'oiseaux; discovered in 2012 by Peter Hill, edited for performance by Hill, and premiered by him in November 2013
Prélude ("Prelude")	piano	1964	published 2002
La Fauvette des jardins ("Garden Warbler")	piano	1970–72	
Petites esquisses d'oiseaux ("Little Sketches of Birds")	piano	1985	
=== Electronic ===			
Fête des belles eaux ("Festival of the Beautiful Waters")	6 ondes Martenots	1937	4th mvt arr. as 5th mvt of Quatuor pour la fin du temps; published 2003
Deux monodies en quarts de ton ("Two Monodies in Quarter-Tones")	ondes Martenot	1938	believed lost until discovered recently
Musique de scène pour un Œdipe ("Stage Music for Oedipus")	ondes Martenot	1942	premiere 1942; unpublished
Timbres-durées (Timestamps) musique concrète	tape	1952	realised by Pierre Henry in the radiophonic workshop of French radio, an experiment which Messiaen later deemed a failure; premiere 1952; published in fragments but withdrawn, recording released 2004
=== Unspecified instruments ===			
Fugue sur un sujet d'Henri Rabaud ("Fugue on a subject of Henri Rabaud")	4 parts in SATB clefs	1926	conservatoire assignment; published along with two other fugues that won the first prize that year
Fugue pour le Concours de Rome (sur un sujet de Georges Hüe) ("Fugue for the Prix de Rome Contest (on a subject of Georges Hüe)")	4 parts in SATB clefs	1930	unpublished
Fugue pour le Concours de Rome ("Fugue for the Prix de Rome Contest")	4 parts in SATB clefs	1931	unpublished
Vingt Leçons en harmonie (dans le style de certains compositeurs importants de l'histoire musicale de l'harmonie de Monteverdi à Ravel) ("Twenty Lessons in Harmony (in the style of some important composers in the musical history of harmony from Monteverdi to Ravel)")	various or unspecified instruments	1939	written for a course Messiaen taught at the Opéra à Paris, the lessons analyze the harmonization of continuo and melody in the style of different composers (Monteverdi, Rameau, Bach, Gluck, Mozart, Schumann, Franck, Lalo, Chabrier, Massenet, Fauré, Albéniz, Debussy, Ravel, and Traditional Indian songs)
Chant donné (Leçon d'harmonie : Hommage à Jean Gallon) ("Song Assignment (Lesson in Harmony: Tribute to Jean Gallon)")	4 parts in SATB clefs	1953	written as part of a tribute (with 63 of his colleagues in other chants donnés) to the memory of Jean Gallon

== Treatises ==
- Technique de mon langage musical ("The technique of my musical language"). Paris: Leduc, 1944.
- Vingt leçons d'harmonie ("20 harmony lessons"). Paris: Leduc, 1944.
- Traité de rythme, de couleur, et d'ornithologie (1949–1992) ("Treatise on rhythm, colour and ornithology"), completed by Yvonne Loriod. 7 parts bound in 8 volumes. Paris: Leduc, 1994–2002.
- Analyses of the Piano Works of Maurice Ravel, edited by Yvonne Loriod, translated by Paul Griffiths. [Paris]: Durand, 2005.
