= Diptyque (Messiaen) =

Composition for organ by Olivier Messiaen

- essai sur la vie terrestre et l'éternité bienheureuse
- by Olivier Messiaen
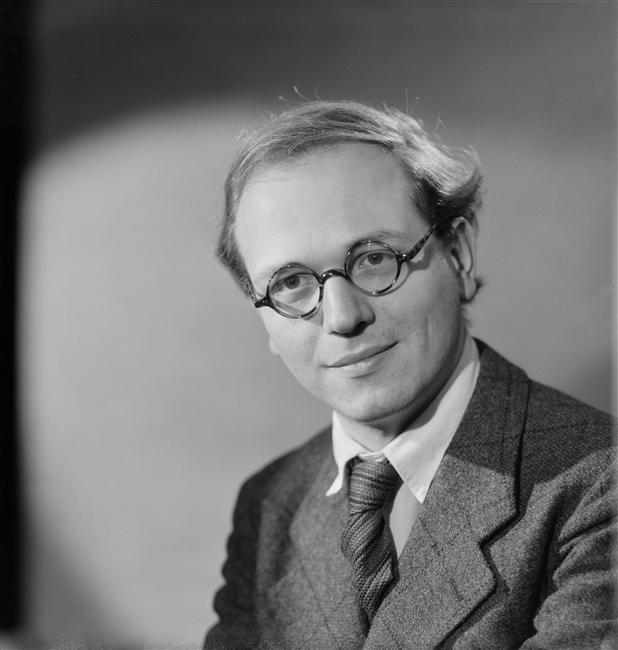
- Messiaen in 1937; photograph by Studio Harcourt
- Key: C minor
- Catalogue: Simeone: I/3
- Year: 1929-1930
- Form: diptych
- Based on: Catholic theology
- Time: 2/4, then 4/4
- Composed: 1930: Paris
- Dedication: Paul Dukas, Marcel Dupré
- Performed: 20 February 1930: Paris
- Published: May 1930: Paris
- Publisher: Éditions Durand
- Movements: one (two sections)
- Scoring: pipe organ

Premiere
- Date: 30 March 1930 for Les amis de l'orgue
- Location: Église de la Sainte Trinité, ninth arrondissement, Paris, France
- Performers: Olivier Messiaen, organ

Diptyque : essai sur la vie terrestre et l'éternité bienheureuse (French: Diptych: essay on earthly life and blessed eternity) is a bipartite essay for organ in C minor by the French composer Olivier Messiaen. Written from 1929 through 1930, it is inspired by his Catholic faith and contrasts two states of existence: the earthly life and the heavenly afterlife.

== History ==
In autumn of 1929, Messiaen acquainted himself with Charles Quef, then organist at the Église de la Sainte Trinité in Paris. Through this, he was able to play his first two organ recitals in the Church of Saint John the Baptist in Tencin on 15 and 22 September.

The Diptyque was dedicated to two of Messiaen's most influential composers and teachers: Marcel Dupré and Paul Dukas. The first part of the work is clearly influenced by their style. Messiaen himself premièred a concert for Les amis de l'orgue on 20 February 1930, at the Église de la Sainte Trinité. It immediately caught the attention of fellow musicians and was published shortly afterwards in May 1930, by Éditions Durand. This publication was followed by some of his other compositions (the Préludes were released in June and the Trois mélodies in October). It is Messiaen's only organ work published by Durand.

Messiaen later became critical of his own earlier style. In an interview with Karin Ernst on 24 October 1977, Messiaen referred to the Diptyque as a 'sin' of his youth.

== Structure ==
Although the Diptyque is in a single movement, it has two thematically related sections; many scholars and performers thus consider it a two-movement work out of convenience. Each section lasts slightly under five minutes at the specified tempi. It is scored for solo pipe organ, requiring two manuals and pedals. The second section requires a manual of sixty-one notes, with a top C, unless one could manœuvre octaves through higher-pitched registration. There are inconsistencies, errors or questionable notes (evidenced by redundant accidentals and parallel passages later) in measures 16, 18, 22, 28, 48, 50, 52, 76, 91, and 95.

=== Epigraph ===
The Diptyque originally had an epigraph which was not revealed in the published score. It was crossed out of the composer's holograph manuscript, which is in the Bibliothèque nationale de France in Paris. It reads: "Après les angoisses, les ténèbres de cette vie, la lumière et le repos de l'Éternité..." ('After the anguishes, the darknesses of this life, the light and the rest of Eternity...").

=== i. La vie terrestre, avec ses agitations inutiles ===
Marked Modéré (andante, ♩ = 50; time signature 2/4) in the key of C minor, its first section, "La vie terrestre, avec ses agitations inutiles" (The Earthly life, with its arid encumbrances) is a rapid-paced toccata with a repeating seven-note motif. Neither the tempo nor the time signature change in this section, in contrast to his later style. Here, the composer attempts to express 'the anguish and useless torment of life'.

=== ii. Le paradis ===
Its second section, "Le paradis" (Paradise) is marked Très lent (largo, ♪ = 58; time signature 4/4) and is in the former section's parallel major. According to Messiaen, it is "an adagio in C major, based on a single serene ascending phrase", which "expresses the peace and charity of Christian paradise".

In 1940, during his internment in the Stalag VIII-A camp in Görlitz, Nazi Germany, Messiaen arranged Le paradis for violin and piano from memory. This arrangement then became the eighth and final movement ("Louange à l'immortalité de Jésus") of his Quatuor pour la fin du temps. However, for this transcription, Messiaen transposed it from the original C major up to E major and significantly slowed its tempo, marking it as Extrêmement lent et tendre, extatique (grave; ♪ = 36), which the composer followed in his own recording of the original work.

=== Errata ===
Messiaen manually corrected the following errors in his copy of the published score:

- 28: The penultimate semiquaver in the left hand is D♭.
- 50: The final semiquaver in the left hand is D♭.
- 95: The second semiquaver in the left hand is D♭.

== See also ==
=== Contemporaneous organ works of Messiaen ===
- Le banquet céleste (1928)
- Prélude (1928)
- Offrande au Saint Sacrement (1929)
- Apparition de l'église éternelle (1932)
