= Paul Kim =

Paul Kim may refer to:

- Paul Kim (academic) (born 1970), at the Stanford University Graduate School of Education
- Paul Kim (Anglican bishop) (born 1952), Anglican bishop in South Korea
- Paul Kim Ok-kyun (1925–2010), Roman Catholic bishop in South Korea
- Paul Kim (pianist), American classical pianist
  - Paul Kim & Sons, American classical pianist group
- Paul C. Kim, director of marketing for Everex
- Paul Kim (musician, born 1981), Korean-American musician, singer, rapper and American Idol contestant
- Paul Kim (musician, born 1988), South Korean singer-songwriter
