= Petites Esquisses d'oiseaux =

Petites Esquisses d'oiseaux, is a piano work by Olivier Messiaen composed in 1985, dedicated to his wife Yvonne Loriod. It has six parts, three of which are devoted to robins.

== Analysis ==
In the preface, Messiaen writes:

These are six very short pieces. They are both very similar and very different. Very similar by the harmonic style where complex sounds with changing colors evolve. The blues, reds, oranges, violets, "transposed reversal chords" dominate. The "chords with contracted resonance" and the "chords of the chromatic total" add their more violent or subtle colours. However, each bird has its own aesthetic, the melodic and rhythmic movements differ from one piece to another. The three pieces devoted to familiar robin contain pearly arpeggios, descending, almost glissandos, followed by slow notes, and more refined drawings. The blackbird sings some sunny, a little victorious verses. The song thrush stands out through its incantatory repetitions. Finally, the eurasian skylark, which ends, has a sizzling volubility, revolving around an acute dominant, punctuated from time to time by two slow and strong notes, all corresponding to the phases of the bird's flight.

— Olivier Messiaen, Petites Esquisses d'oiseaux

== Premiere ==
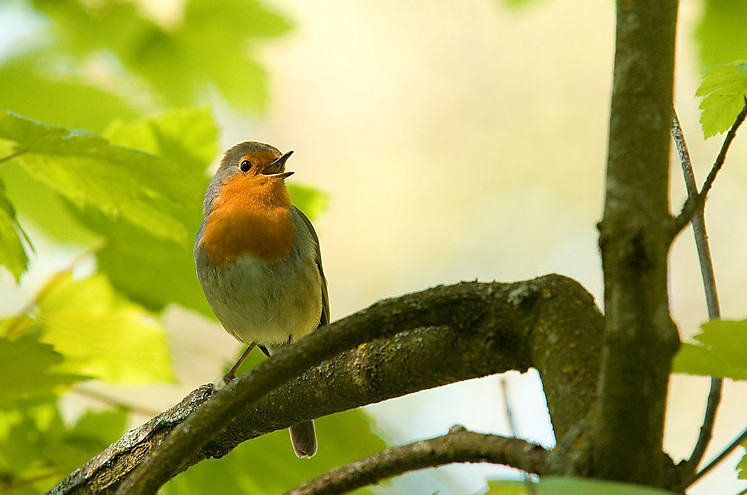
Robin

The piece was premiered at the Théâtre de la Ville in Paris on 26 January 1987 by Yvonne Loriod. The duration is about 14 minutes.

== Titles of the pieces ==
The six movements are titled:

1. Le Rouge-gorge (The Robin, Erithacus rubecula)
2. Le Merle noir (The Common Blackbird, Turdus merula)
3. Le Rouge-gorge (The Robin)
4. La Grive musicienne (The Song Thrush, Turdus philomelos)
5. Le Rouge-gorge (The Robin)
6. L'Alouette des champs (The Eurasian Skylark, Alauda arvensis)

== Recordings ==
Recordings include:

- Yvonne Loriod, piano (+ Préludes, Quatre Études de rythme) Erato Records 2292-45505-2/V ECD 71589, 1987-88
- Paul Kim, piano (+ Catalogue d'oiseaux, La Fauvette des jardins) Centaur Records CRC 2567/68/69, 2001
- Fredrik Ullén, piano Disque BIS-CD-1803, 2012
- Marie Vermeulin, piano Disque paraty 612118, 2013
