= Prelude for Organ (Messiaen) =

Composition for organ by Olivier Messiaen

Prélude
- pour orgue
- by Olivier Messiaen
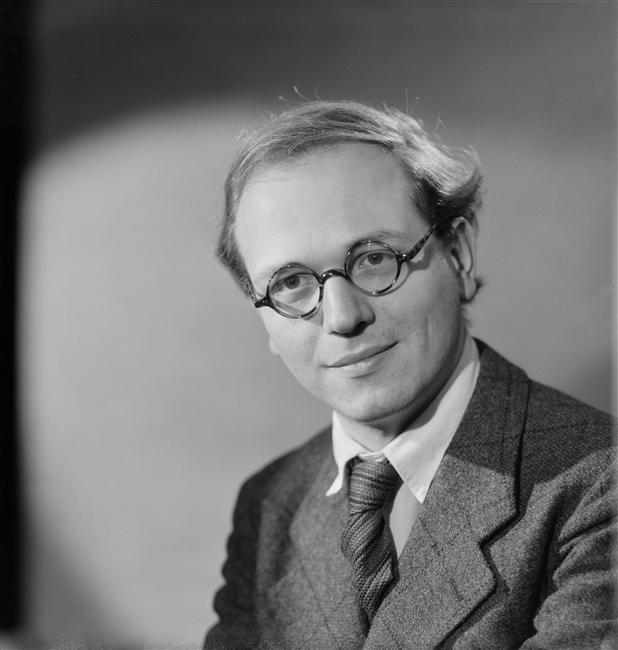
- Olivier Messiaen in 1937
- Form: Prelude
- Composed: Unknown, probably 1929: Paris
- Published: 2002: Paris
- Scoring: Organ

The Prélude, usually affixed with the subtitle pour orgue, is an organ piece in E major by French composer Olivier Messiaen. The work, which dates from the 1920s, is, along with the Offrande au Saint Sacrement, the earliest surviving organ work of the composer. Scholars differ as to the exact date and purpose as to when and why it was composed.

It is usually known as the Prelude for Organ in English to distinguish it from the Preludes for piano and the posthumously published piece from 1964.

The piece along with the Offrande were discovered by Yvonne Loriod in 1997. The Prélude was published posthumously in 2002 by Éditions Alphonse Leduc.

It remains overlooked as one of the lesser-known organ works of the composer.

== History ==
In 1919, Messiaen entered the Conservatoire de Paris, which was widely considered the most important musical school in the nation. He studied there until 1930. Based on the calligraphy of the manuscript, its location of Paris, style of composition, which reflects in some aspects the music of his organ teacher Marcel Dupré; and organ compass, scholars deduced that the work was composed in the second half of the 1920s.

Messiaen had written a supposedly complete catalogue of his works in Technique de mon langage musical (1944). It therefore came as a surprise to Yvonne Loriod, who found the Prélude and Offrande au Saint Sacrement in boxes by the composer's personal desk, to have discovered these pieces in 1997. She sent photocopies of these pieces to colleagues Naji Hakim, who succeeded Messiaen as titular organist of the great organ at the Église de la Sainte Trinité, and Olivier Latry, one of the titular organists of Notre-Dame de Paris.

The piece was revealed publicly for the first time on the CD Inédits and was played by Hakim at the organ of the Église de la Sainte Trinité off a facsimile of the manuscript annotated by Loriod herself.

It was published by Editions Alphonse Leduc (AL 29 914) in 2002 following the Offrande's publication the preceding year. Latry edited the music and wrote the preface, and Hakim edited the registration.

=== Dates ===
In his preface, Latry implies that Messiaen wrote it while studying at the Conservatoire de Paris, citing the influences of Dupré, the Diptyque from this time, and paramountly, the inclusion of notes that were unavailable within the ranges of most organs available to him at the time (with the notable exception of the Conservatoire and several others). The compass lasted to C6 (61 note manuals) and G4 (32 note pedalboard).

Paul Griffiths suggests that the piece was written contemporaneously with La nativité du Seigneur. The scholar Christopher Brent Murray, on the other hand, believes that the Prélude may have been composed in January 1928 and submitted on the 25th of that month. According to him, Messiaen may have referred to the piece as the examination submission. The lack of the usual Bien, which appears on Messiaen's manuscripts as a marking of approval, also points to the theory that this is a conservatoire assignment. It, however, appears on the Offrande's manuscript.

The work's manuscript of eleven pages (six pages of music) lies in the Bibliothèque nationale de France.

== Structure ==
The piece has a duration of nine minutes and a total of 89 measures. It is in E major and has an unchanging time signature of 7/8.

It opens with a brief three-measure introduction, marked Sans hâte (without haste; 96 BPM) with Messiaen's dictated registration being Flutes at 8' and 4' pitch on the Récit (swellbox closed) and a Flûte harmonique on the Positif. Originally, Messiaen dictated the addition of a pedal part to this, with a pedal coupler enabled for the Positif, but this was removed.

The work proper begins with the marking of Lent (adagio; 58 BPM) lasts from measures 4 to 17. Here, Messiaen calls for:

- Récit: voix célestes
- Positif: flûte 4', quintaton 16'
- Grand-Orgue: fonds 8' sans principal
- Pédale: flûte 16' acc. P[ositif]

The registration was revised, changing it to:

- Récit: voix céleste, gambe 8'
- Positif: flûte 4', quintaton 16'
- Grand-Orgue: fonds 8'
- Pédale: flûtes 16' et 8' acc. P.[ositif]

Modéré, presque vif (Moderately, almost quick), marked at 152 BPM, is the final section of the piece (which crescendoes to a thunderous staccato climax); which contains the development, the recapitulation, and coda. Here, high Gs appear in the Pedal. They can be omitted if the organ compass is insufficient.

The work closes with a slow and quiet coda which calls for a Flûte 8' on the Récit, Flûte 4' and Quintaton 16' on the Positif, and Flûte 4' on the Pedal (which eventually disappears). It ends in extreme quietness, with a ppp mark.

The introduction, Lent, and Modéré, presque vif, can be classified as sections, and are divided by fermati.

=== Edits ===
Latry's edits to the piece are compared with the work's original manuscript here. The former refers to the original manuscript and the latter refers to the published score.

- 5: Soprano - Last note is A# and not A.
- 25: Soprano - Third note is D and not D#.
- 33: Soprano - Eighth note is C♭ (B), not D♭.
- 41: Alto - Fourth and eighth notes are D♭, not D.
- 72: The final chord must replicate the first chord.
- 73: Soprano - Last note is A#.
- 78: Tenor - Last two quavers are G and F. Legato.
- 79: Soprano and Tenor - Last quavers are A and G. Legato.

In addition, Latry says that although tempi were indicated by the composer himself, performers should feel free to adapt their tempi preferences according to the venue as they can be regarded as too fast in some cases.

== Recordings ==
Since this piece was not initially intended for publication and was discarded as juvenilia, it has not been performed very often and remains one of the lesser known works by Messiaen. Here is a list of notable recordings of the piece:

Organ	Record company	Year of recording	Format
Naji Hakim	Éditions Jade	1999	CD
Olivier Latry	Deutsche Grammophon	2002	CD
