= Catalogue d'oiseaux =

Piano music by Olivier Messiaen

Catalogue d'oiseaux ("Catalogue of birds") is a work for piano solo by Olivier Messiaen consisting of thirteen pieces, written between October 1956 and September 1958. It is devoted to birds and dedicated to his second wife Yvonne Loriod.

== Premiere ==
The work was premiered by Yvonne Loriod on 15 April 1959 in Paris, Salle Gaveau, for the concerts of the "Domaine musical" organized by Pierre Boulez.

== Aim of the work ==
For these pieces, Messiaen did not want to be limited to the evocation of the bird of which each of it bears the title.

Each piece is written in honor of a French province. It bears the title of the bird-type of the chosen region. It is not alone: its habitat neighbors surround it and also sing (...) - its landscape, the hours of day and night that change this landscape, are also present, with their colors, their temperatures, the magic of their perfumes

== Title of the pieces ==
- 1 - The Alpine chough (Chocard des Alpes)

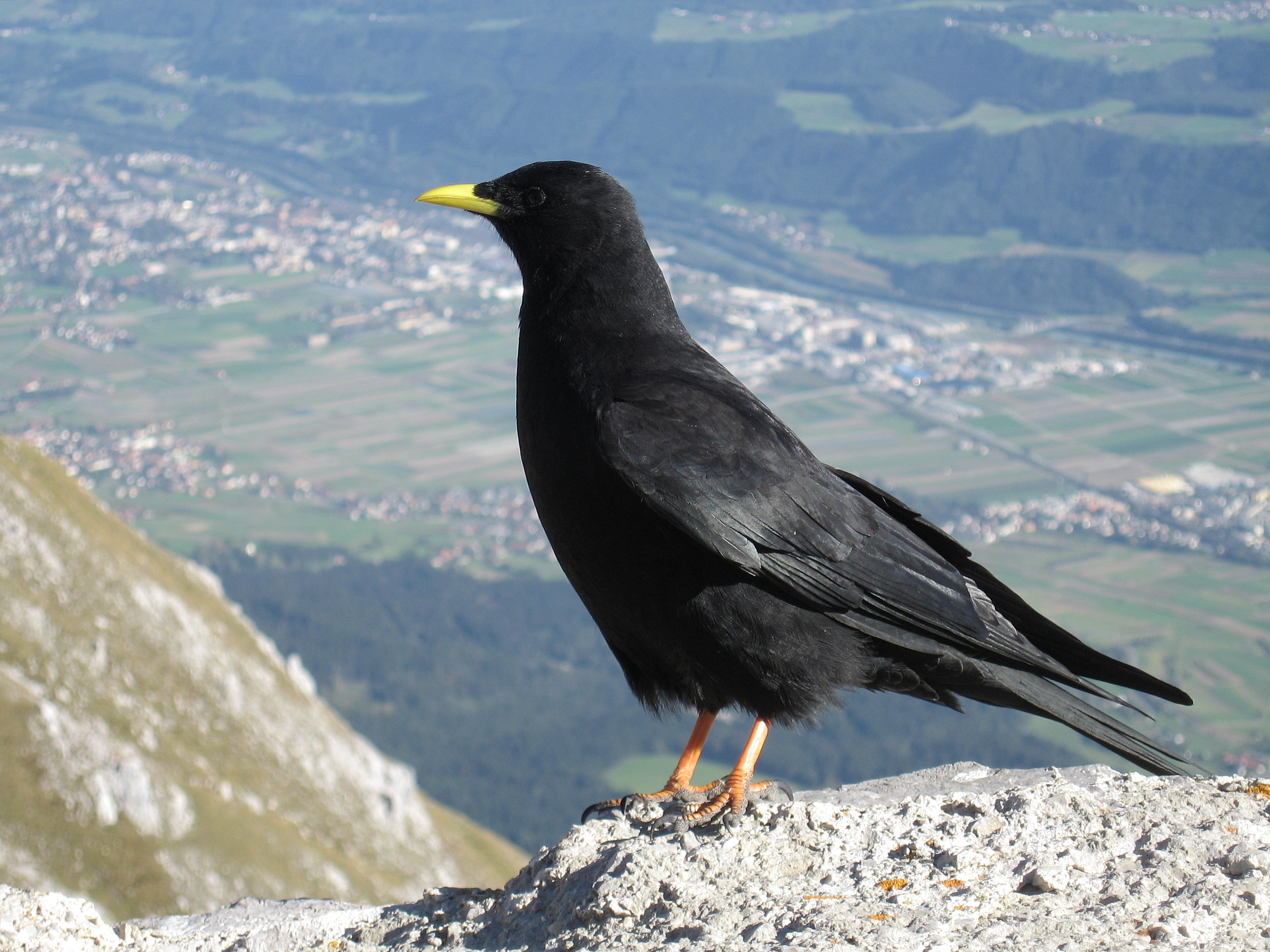

- 2 - The Eurasian golden oriole (Loriot d'Europe)

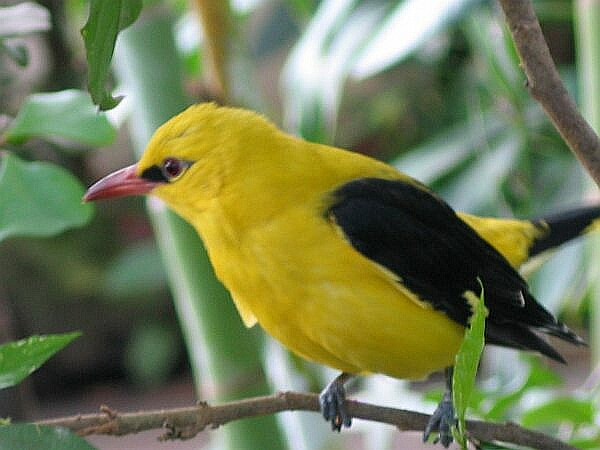

- 3 - The blue rock thrush (Merle bleu)

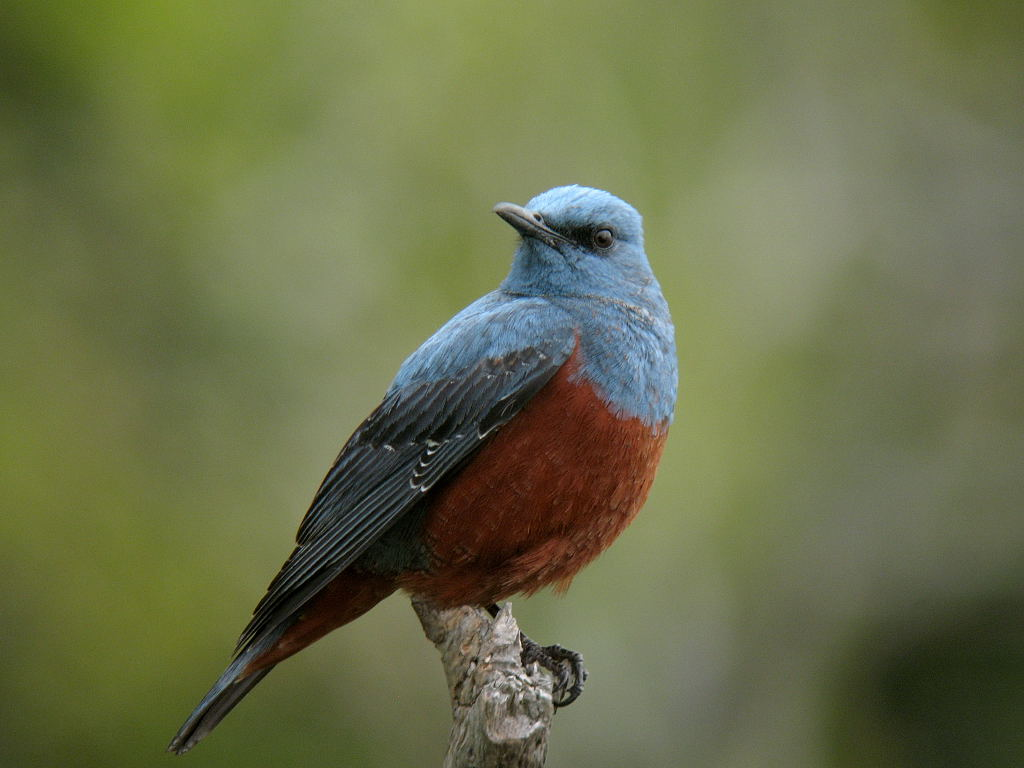

- 4 - The western black-eared wheatear (Traquet stapazin)

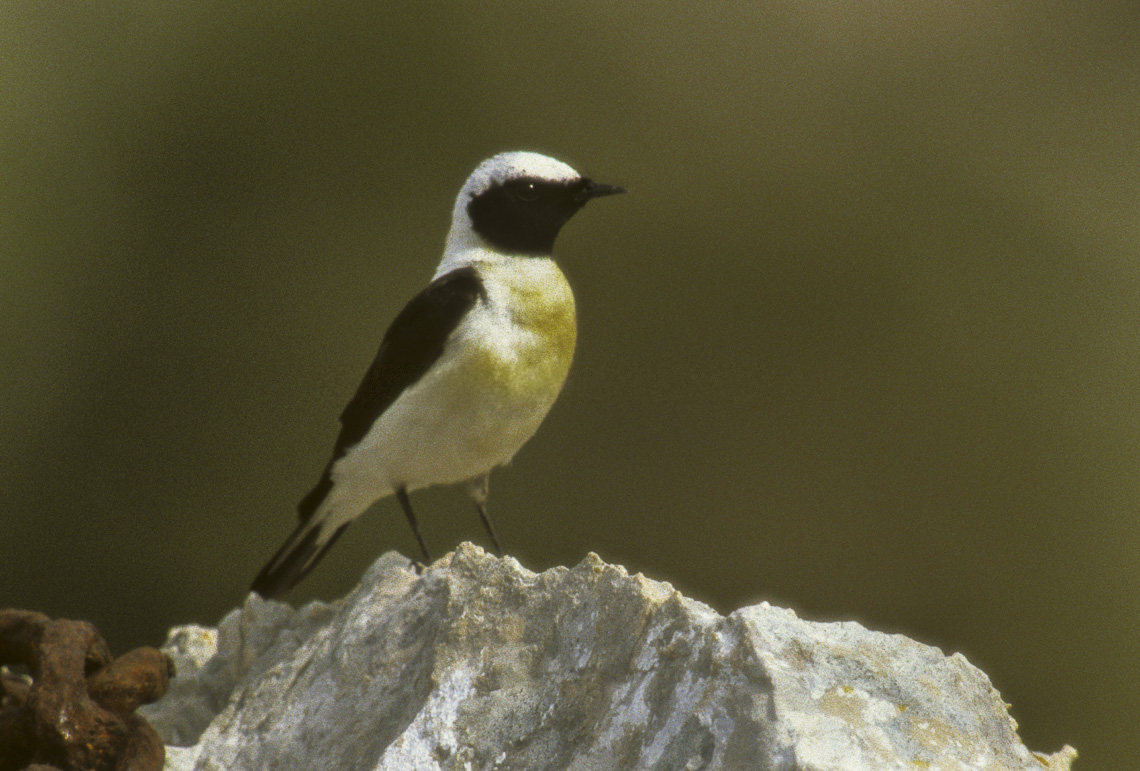

- 5 - The tawny owl (Chouette hulotte)

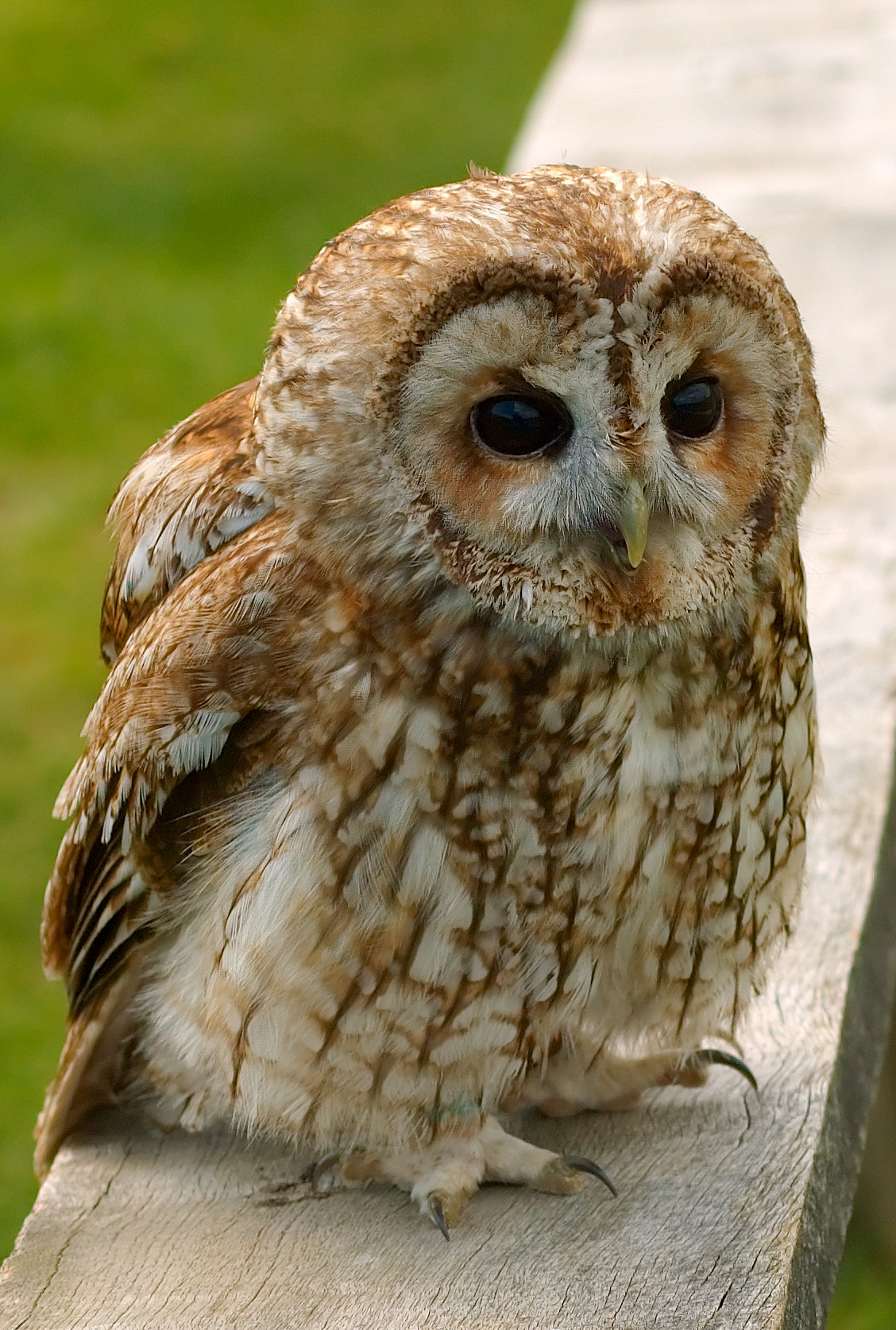

- 6 - The woodlark (Alouette lulu)

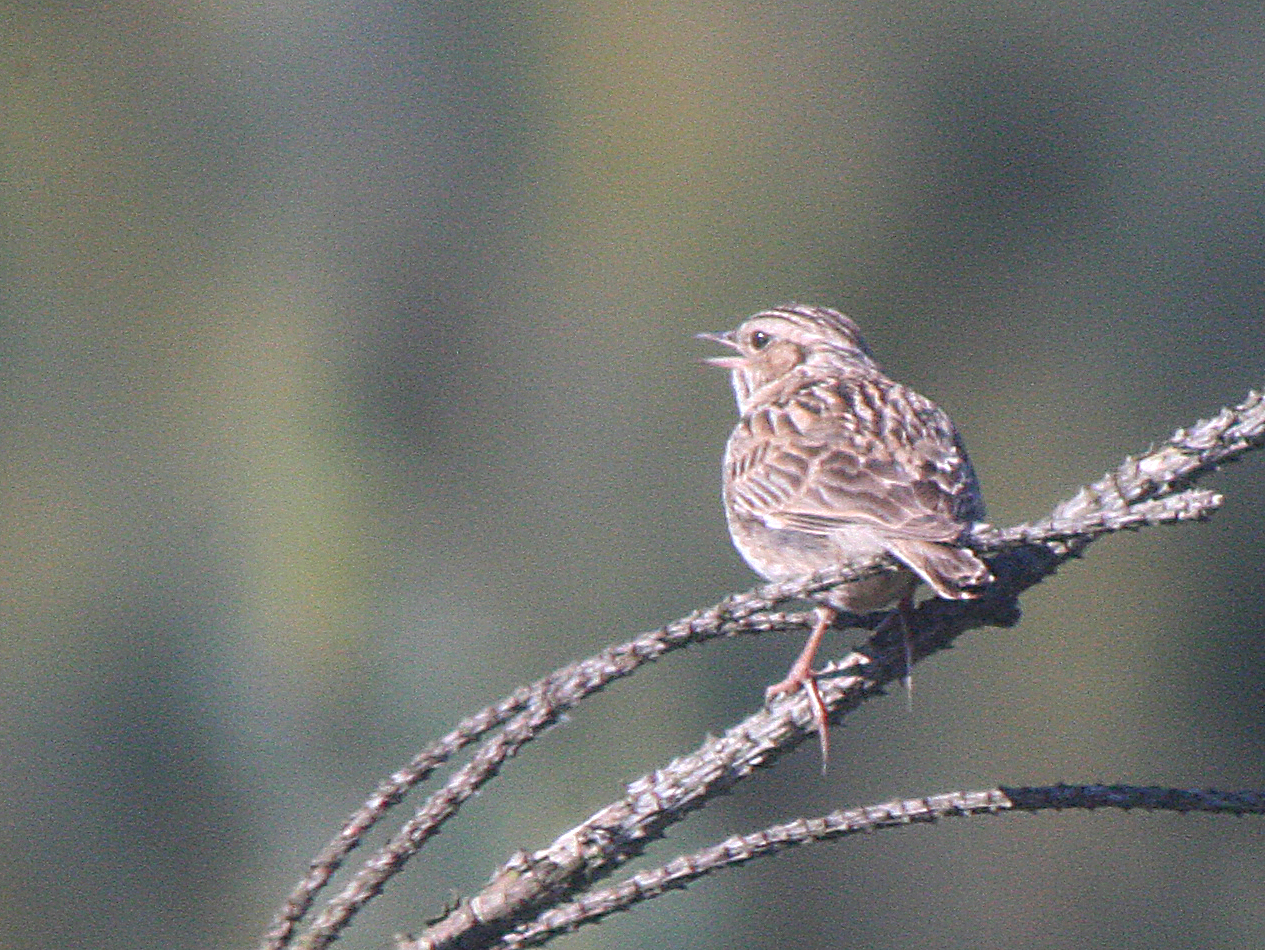

- 7 - The Eurasian reed warbler (Rousserolle effarvatte)

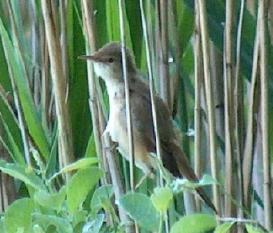

- 8 - The greater short-toed lark (Alouette calandrelle)

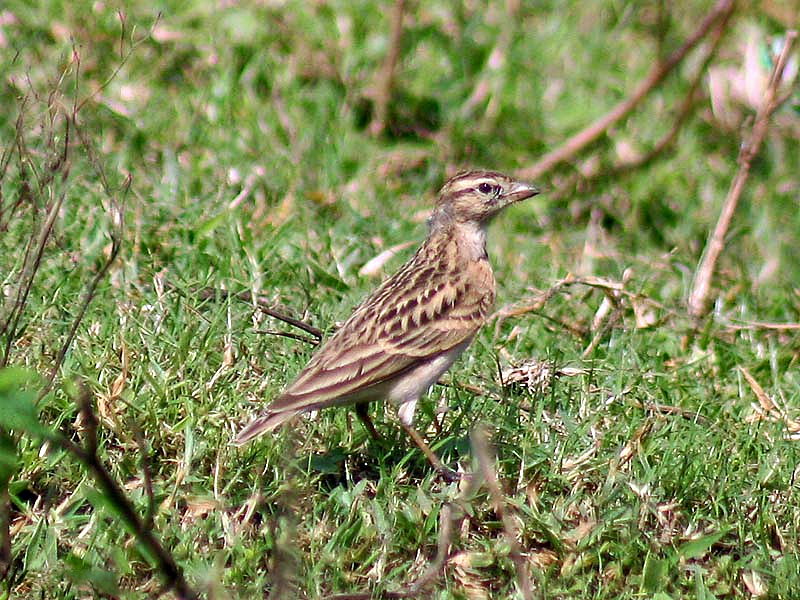

- 9 - The Cetti's warbler (Bouscarle de Cetti)

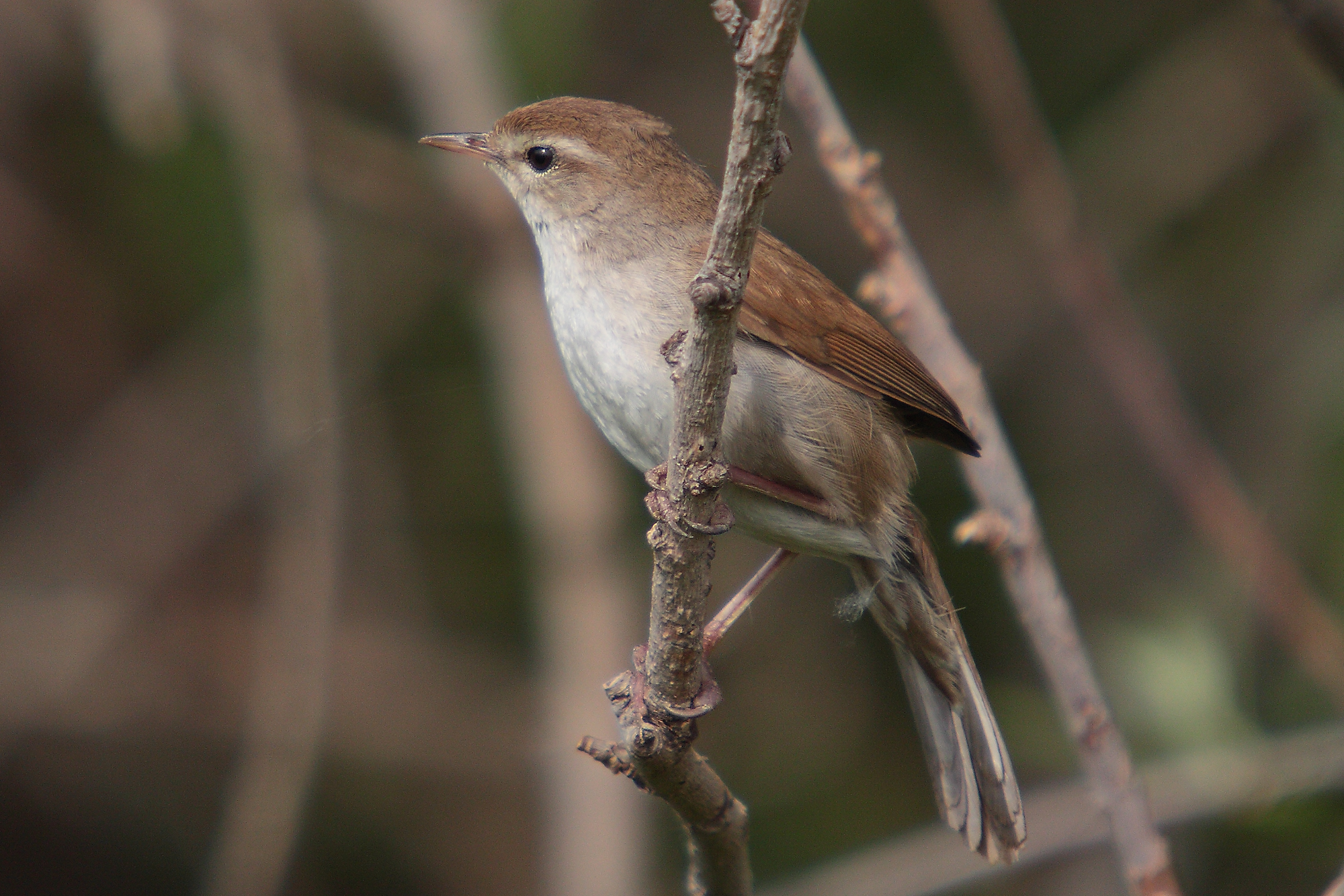

- 10 - The common rock thrush (Merle de roche)

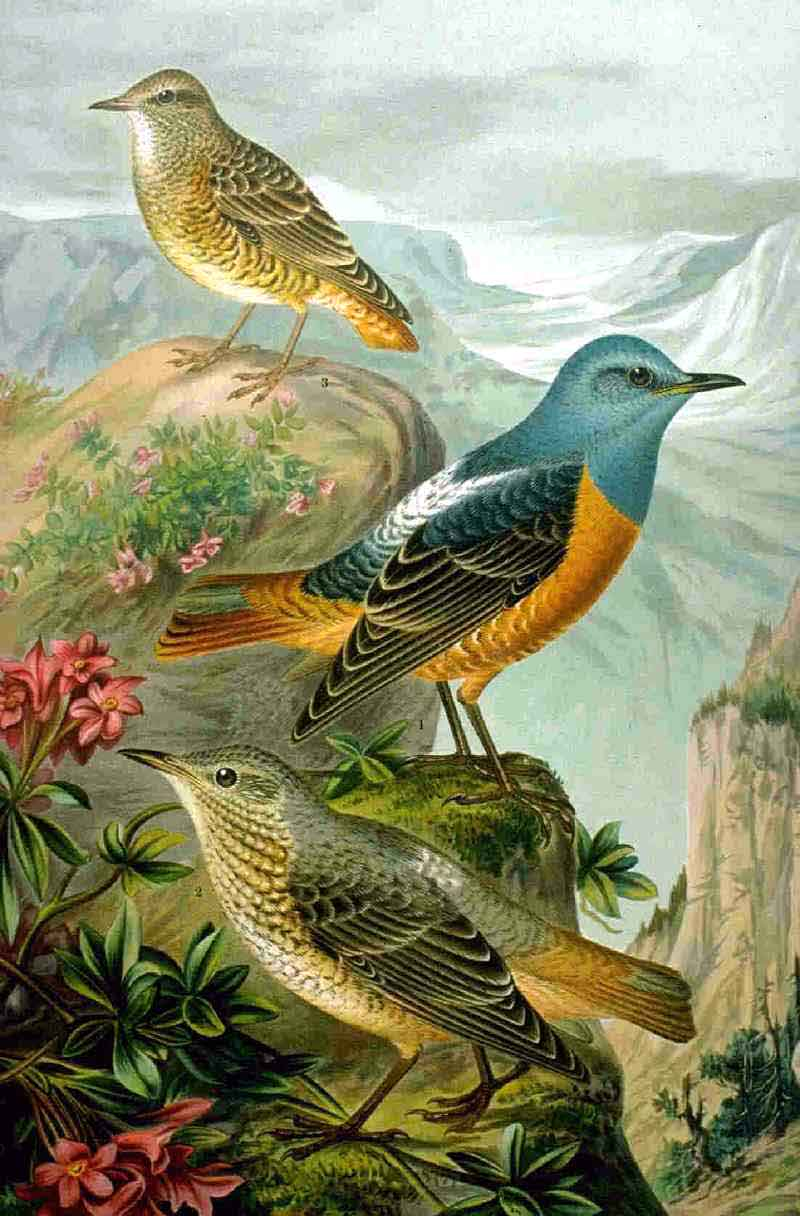

- 11 - The common buzzard (Buse variable)

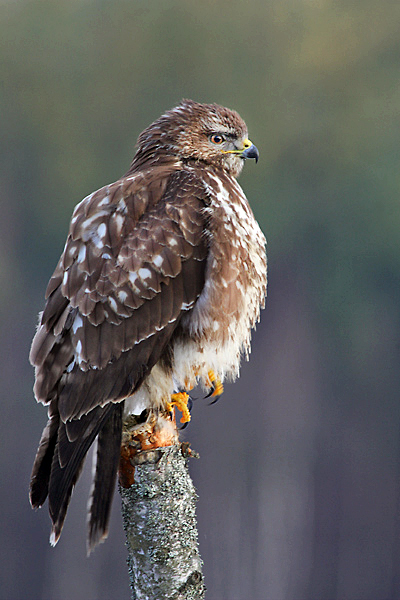

- 12 - The black wheatear (Traquet rieur)

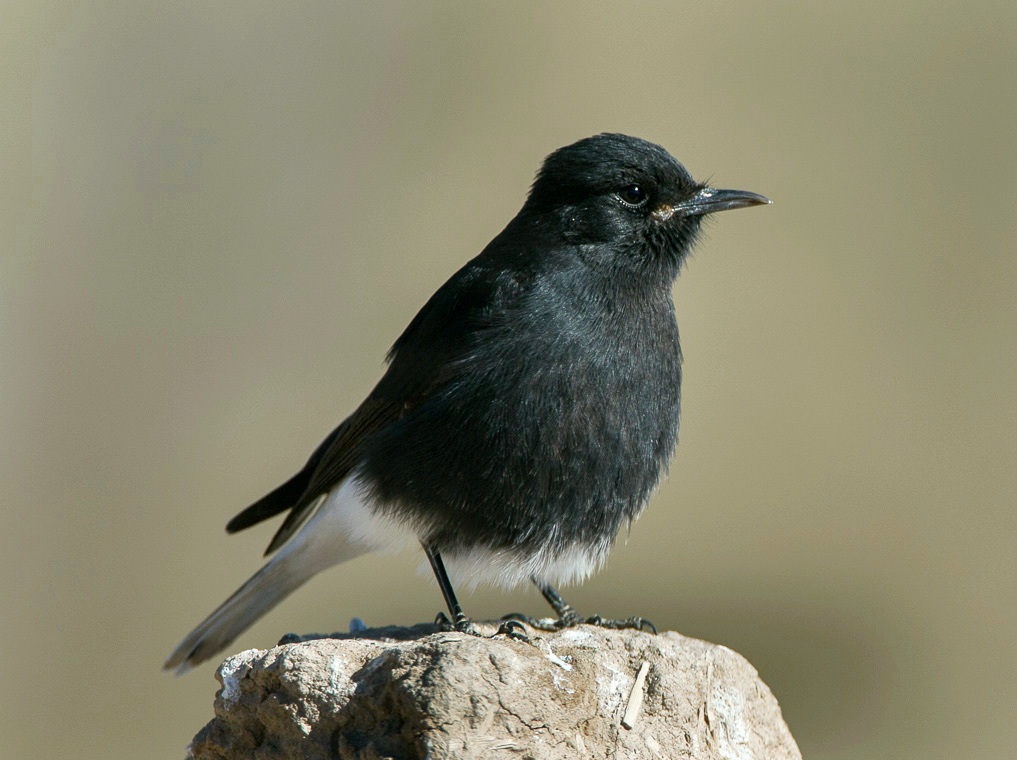

- 13 - The Eurasian curlew (Courlis cendré)

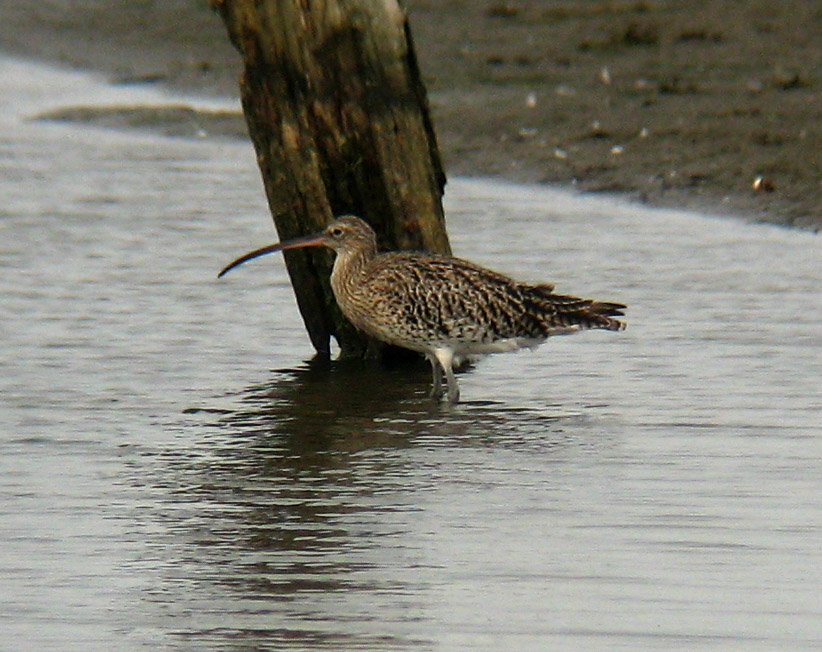

== Recordings ==
- Yvonne Loriod: Erato Records 2292-45505-2/VI; ECD 71590 (1970–1973)
- Peter Hill: Regis B000Q7RKW8 (1986)
- Anatol Ugorski: Deutsche Grammophon 4743452 (1994)
- Hakon Austbo: Naxos Records 8.553532.34 (1997), Also includes Petites esquisses d'oiseaux (composed in 1985).
- Paul Kim: Centaur Records CRC 2567/68/69 (2001), Also includes La Fauvette des jardins and Petites esquisses d'oiseaux
- Roger Muraro: Accord 4657682 (2002)
- Pierre-Laurent Aimard: Pentatone PTC 5186670 (2018)
- Carl-Axel Dominique BIS BIS-CD-594/596 Also includes "La Fauvette des jardins" and "Petites esquisses d'oiseaux".

== See also ==
- List of compositions by Olivier Messiaen
