= Matthew Kim =

Matthew Kim may refer to:

- Matthew Kim, known professionally as BM (rapper), (born 1992), American rapper
- Matthew Kim (The Flash), a fictional character on American superhero television series The Flash
- Matthew Kim, classical pianist and member of Paul Kim & Sons
