= Monody (disambiguation) =

A monody is a piece of music sung by one voice with instrumental accompaniment.

Monody may also refer to:

- Monody (lament), Byzantine genre
- Monody (band), American electronic music group
- Monody (album), a 2010 album by Mantler
- "Monodie", a composition for organ by Olivier Messaien
- "Monody", a 2015 song by TheFatRat
- "Monody", a song by the 3rd and the Mortal from the album In This Room
- Monody, a 2018 film from Nathaniel Dorsky's Arboretum Cycle
