= Heavenly banquet =

Concept in Christian theology

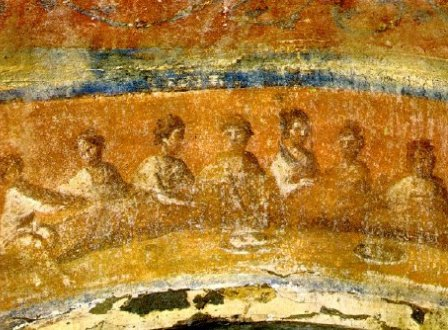
This art from the Catacomb of Priscilla in Rome may depict either the heavenly banquet or an agape feast.

The heavenly banquet or Messianic banquet is a concept in Christian theology which has its roots in Isaiah 25:6. It refers to a place in heaven or the new Earth where the Christian faithful, in particular the martyrs, go following heaven. Though frequently depicted in early Christian art, the imagery is now used sparingly except for references in the Eucharist.

== Textual basis ==
The Gospel of Matthew repeatedly describes banquets and feasts as being present in the kingdom of heaven. Elsewhere, Jesus mentions eating and drinking in the heavenly kingdom. Some references to the heavenly banquet conceive it as being thrown by Abraham (cf. Matthew 8:11 sqq.). The heavenly banquet is mentioned in several third-century martyrdom narratives, including the Martyrdom of Marian and James and the Testament of the Forty Martyrs.

== Eucharist ==
The heavenly banquet is referenced in the communion liturgy in a number of Christian sects. For example, the close of the standard communion liturgy of the United Methodist Church reads:

By your Spirit make us one with Christ, one with each other, and one in ministry to all the world, until Christ comes in final victory and we feast at his heavenly banquet. Through your Son Jesus Christ, with the Holy Spirit in your holy church, all honor and glory is yours, almighty Father, now and forever. Amen.

== In Christian art ==
The heavenly banquet was a common motif in early catacomb art. Typically, these would depict a table of seven men feasting on bread, wine and fish. Some scholars allege that the heavenly banquet imagery is linked to that of the pagan refrigerium. Catacomb art depicting the heavenly banquet may alternately be interpreted as depicting the Eucharist or the agape feast.

=== Music ===
Olivier Messiaen's 1928 organ piece Le banquet céleste deals with the heavenly banquet as its subject.

In addition, his orchestral piece Le banquet eucharistique, from which the former piece stems, deals with the heavenly banquet as associated with the Eucharist.
