= Verset pour la fête de la Dédicace =

Composition by Olivier Messiaen

- by Olivier Messiaen
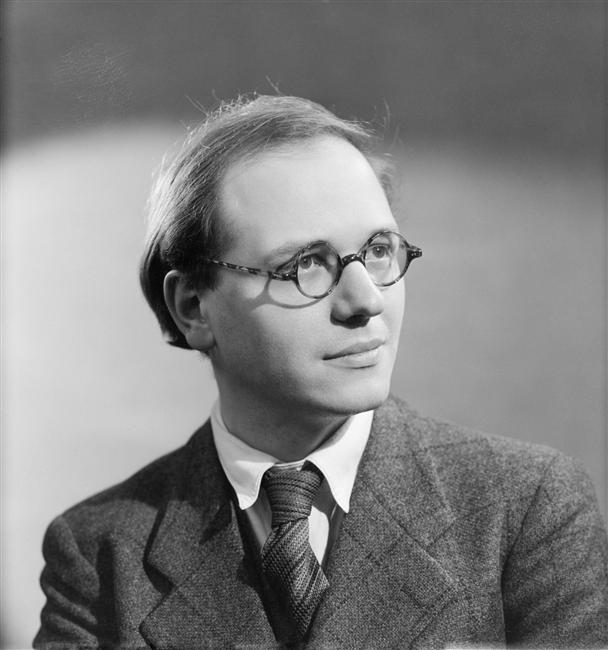
- Olivier Messiaen
- Composed: December 1960: Paris
- Published: 13 June 1961: Paris
- Scoring: Organ

The Verset pour la fête de la Dédicace (French: Verset for the Festival of the Dedication of a Church) is a short composition for organ by French composer Olivier Messiaen. It was completed in 1960.

== Background ==
The Verset was composed as a response to a commission by the Conservatoire de Paris. The piece would be used at the organ competitive examination which took place on June 13, 1961, at the Conservatoire. It was completed in Paris in December 1960 and was premiered at the examination. It was published that year by Éditions Alphonse Leduc.

== Structure ==
The piece is scored for solo organ and has a total duration of around 9 minutes. Messiaen used plainchant and birdsong extensively throughout the whole piece.

The Verset starts with a monodic theme entitled Alleluia de la Dédicace, which he also used in the second movement of his Méditations sur le mystère de la Sainte Trinité. However, unlike in the Méditations, the melody has several chromatic changes, turning it into an atonal melody. After presenting the main theme, he alternates different themes: the Alleluia, a consolation, and a supplication, a loud central section of the piece. Intersparsed between these sections are extended passages of birdsong. The song thrush is the only bird to be presented in the piece.

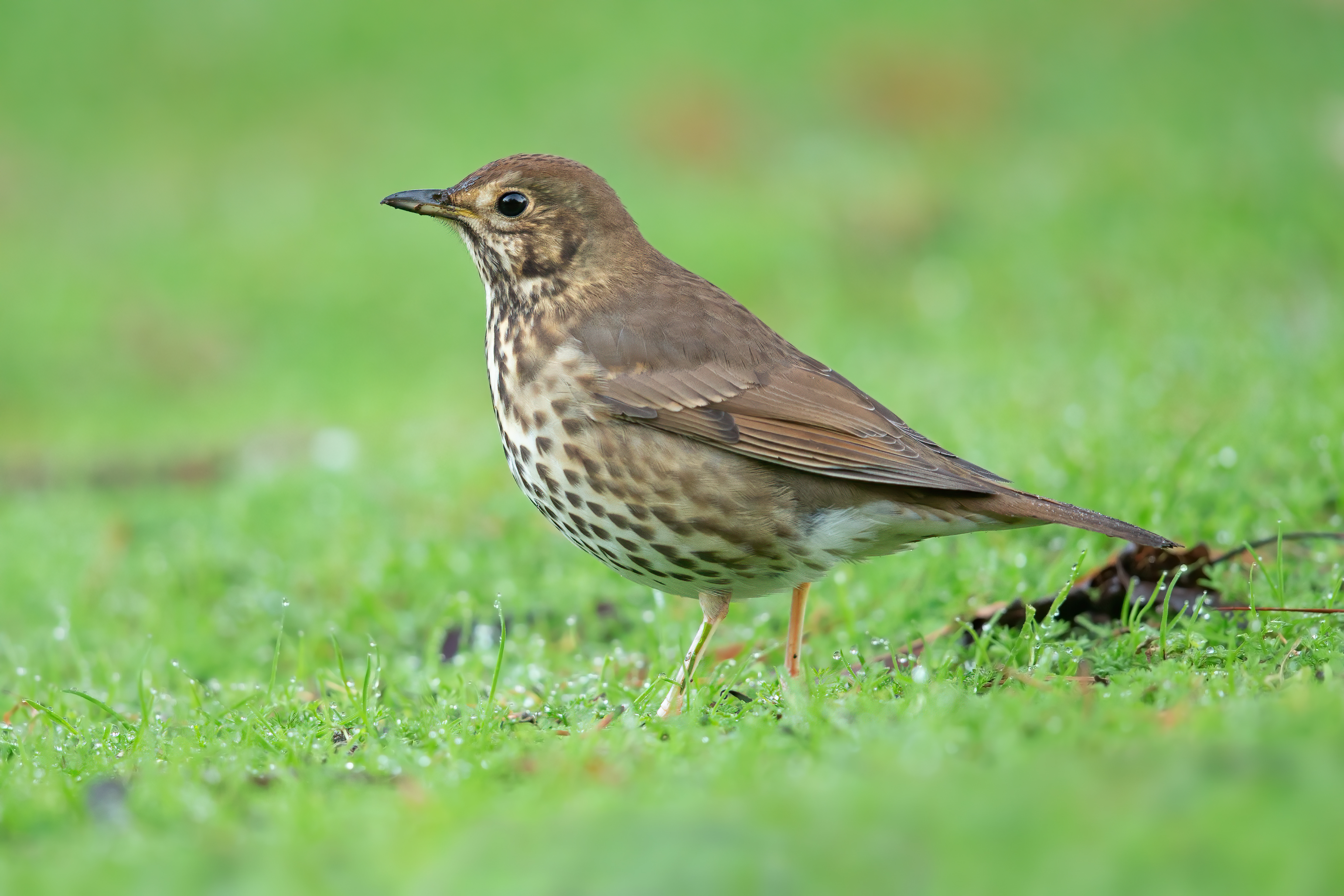
Song thrush
