= James Kim (disambiguation) =

James Kim (1971–2006) was an American television personality and technology analyst for cable television and internet site CNET.

James Kim or Jim Kim may also refer to:

- Kim Chin-kyung (born 1935), also known as James, Korean-American professor and university founder
- Jim Yong Kim (born 1959), Korean-American physician and President of the World Bank
- Jimmy Kim (born 1967), American taekwondo practitioner
- James Kim (American businessman), billionaire and founder of chipmaker Amkor
- James Kim, classical pianist and member of Paul Kim & Sons
