= Les Corps glorieux =

Organ composition by Olivier Messiaen

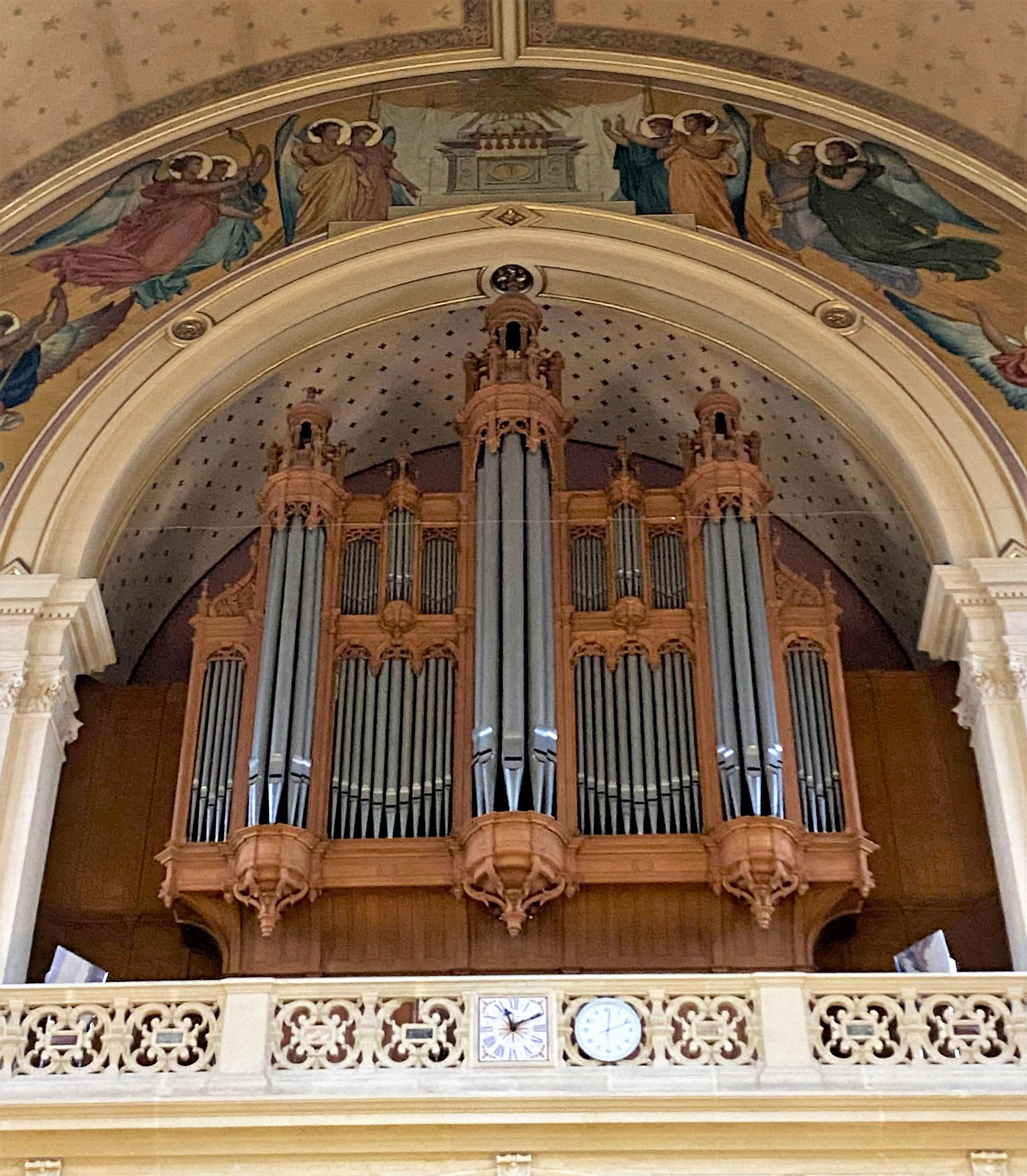
The main organ at Église de la Sainte-Trinité, where Olivier Messiaen was organist

Les corps glorieux, Sept visions brèves de la Vie des ressuscités (French: The Bodies Glorious, Seven Brief Visions of the Life of the Resurrected) are a large cycle for organ composed in the summer of 1939 in Saint-Théoffrey (Isère) by Olivier Messiaen. The work was completed on 25 August 1939, a week before the declaration of the Second World War, and premiered by Messiaen himself on 15 April 1945 at the Palais de Chaillot.

Les corps glorieux marks an evolution in the musical language of Olivier Messiaen, combining features of both Indian classical music and Gregorian chant. The work, together with L'Ascension (1934) and La Nativité du Seigneur (1935), is one of the three early organ cycles of the composer.

== Structure ==
Les corps glorieux, divided into three books, consists of the following seven movements:

=== Book I ===
==== 1. Subtilité des corps glorieux ====
The 'Subtlety of the Bodies Glorious' is a single unharmonised melody based on a Gregorian antiphon. Each end of a phrase is repeated as an echo. Cornet registrations alternate between the Grand-Orgue, Positif and Récit manuals. The unchanging monophony of this movement, the simplest and purest musical form, symbolises the "subtilité".

The epigraph of this movement, added by the composer, reads translated: "An earthly body is being sown, a spiritual body is raised." (1 Corinthians 15:44) "And they shall be as the angels of God in heaven." (Matthew 22:30)

==== 2. Les eaux de la grâce ====
"The Waters of Grace" are symbolised here by a 4' ostinato in the pedal, which is simultaneously played in diminution by the left hand, while in the right hand a harmonized melody is heard. The octave doubling of this melody by the 16' register gives an unusual effect. After 29 bars, the movement breaks without a real conclusion - the melody could be carried on to infinity.

The epigraph of this sentence reads: "The Lamb in the midst of the throne will lead the chosen to the waters of life." (Revelation John 7:17)

==== 3. L'ange aux parfums ====
The textures of "The Angel with Incense" are wide-ranging, from simple monophony to complicated counterpoint. At the beginning of the second part of the movement, a unison melody acts as a cantus firmus . In a following, fast section, the ascent of the incense is symbolised through fast semiquaver runs. These runs abruptly cut short to end the movement.

The epigraph of this movement reads: "The fragrance of incense rose up to God with the prayers of the saints from the hand of the angel." (Revelation 8: 4)

=== Book II ===
==== 4. Combat de la Mort et de la Vie ====
"Combat of Death and of Life" is the longest piece of the cycle, lasting over fifteen minutes. Death initially embodies an aggressive toccata over a powerful low motif, after which life is represented by a quiet, meditative second half.

The epigraph used by the composer in this movement reads: "Death and life fought a strange struggle. Though dead, the prince of life is victorious and reigns. He saith, My father, I am risen, and I am with thee." It is taken from the Sequence and Introitus of Easter.

=== Book III ===
==== 5. Force et agilité des corps glorieux ====
In "Power and rapidity of the bodies glorious", the main motif consists of a brief glissando followed by a staccato quaver chain on a single note, in octaves.

The epigraph of this movement reads: "A weak body is sown, a powerful body is raised" (1 Corinthians 15:43).

==== 6. Joie et clarté des corps glorieux ====
Probably the most famous part of the cycle, the Joy and clarity of the bodies glorious presents a unison, rhapsodic theme in the upper voice, interrupted by three chords played in the récit, is heard at the beginning of the movement over a receding fifth in the pedal. This is followed by a quieter middle section, in which the cromorne of the Positif and the Hautbois of the Récite correspond. The main and middle sections alternate with each other, followed by the coda, which shows the main part rhythmically slightly changed. The so-called "Freudenmotiv" then breaks off spectacularly and the movement ends with a virtuosic glissando.

The subtitle of this movement reads: "Then the righteous will shine like the sun in the kingdom of their father." (Matthew 13:43)

==== 7. Le Mystère de la Sainte Trinité ====
In contrast to La Nativité du Seigneur, the work calmly and solemnly concludes on a meditation on The Mystery of the Holy Trinity. The holy Trinity is symbolised by the three-part counterpoint of the movement. Contrasting stop registrations (32' in the pedal against 16' and 2 'in the Récit) dominate this movement, which may be regarded as a precursor (not in style but in subject) to the organ-cycle Méditations sur le Mystère de la Sainte Trinité.

The subtitle of this movement reads: "Almighty Father. With your only Son and Holy Spirit, you are a God. Not in the uniqueness of a person, but in the Trinity of a Being. "(from the Preface to the Sunday Trinitatis)
