= Håkon Austbø =

Norwegian musician

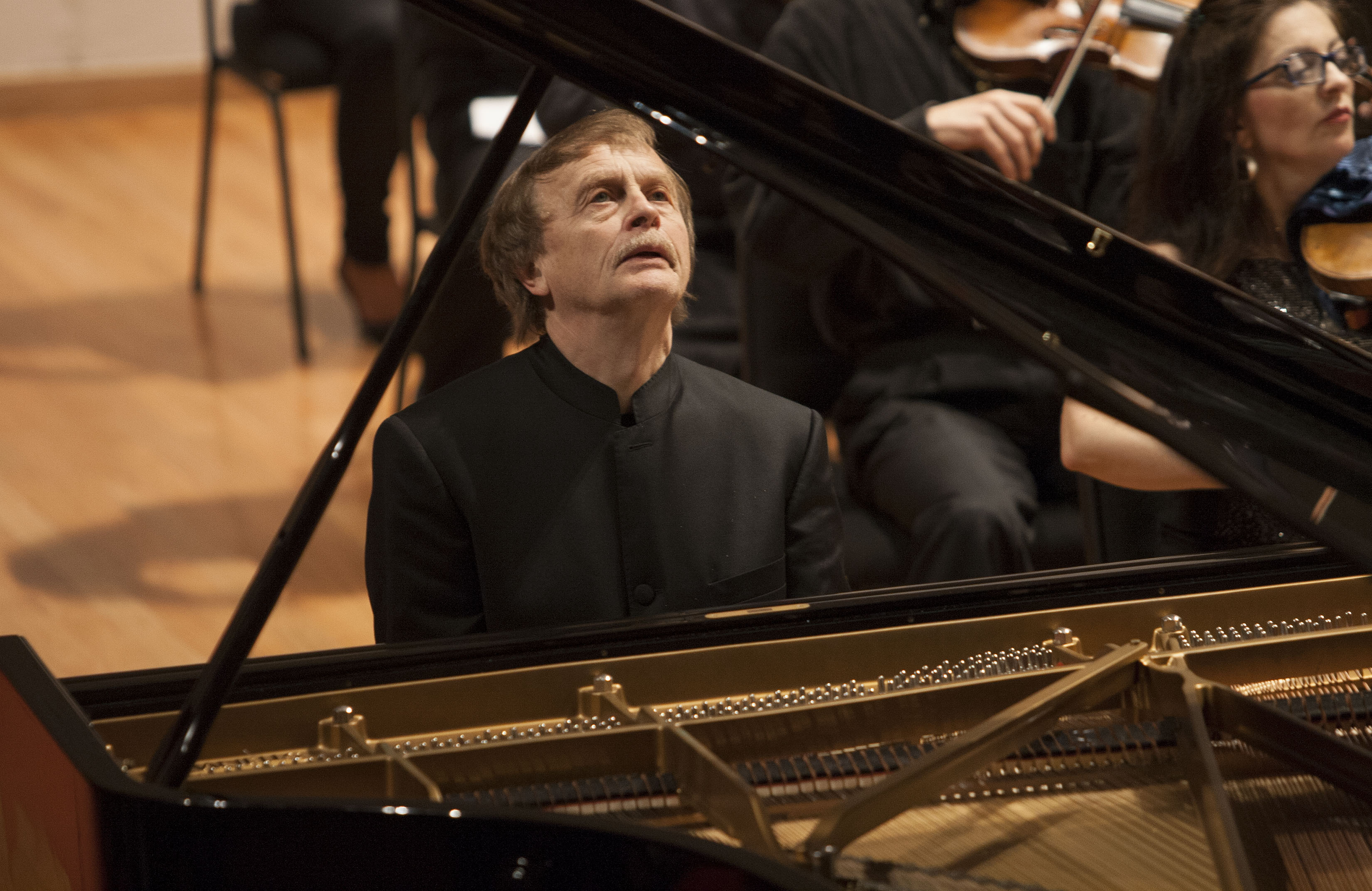
In Mexico City, 2015.

Håkon Austbø (born October 22, 1948) is a Norwegian classical pianist. He has created many recordings for the label Brilliant Classics and Naxos Records, and is also a professor at the Amsterdam conservatory.

Born in Kongsberg, Austbø studied in Paris, New York and Munich, before settling in the Netherlands in 1974.

Austbø's recordings include works by Olivier Messiaen (complete works for piano), Claude Debussy (complete works for piano), Alexander Scriabin (complete piano sonatas), Erik Satie, Johannes Brahms, Robert Schumann, Leoš Janáček (complete works for piano), and Edvard Grieg (complete Lyric Pieces).

Austbø was also a founder and director of the LUCE project, which was founded to realize Scriabin's Clavier à lumières.

== Awards and recognition ==
In 1971, he received the first prize of the International Competition for contemporary music Olivier Messiaen. In 1998, he was awarded the Edison Prize for his recording of Messiaen's Catalog of Birds. In 2003, he was awarded the Grieg Prize by the Grieg Museum in Norway.
