= Messe de la Pentecôte =

Organ mass composed by Olivier Messiaen

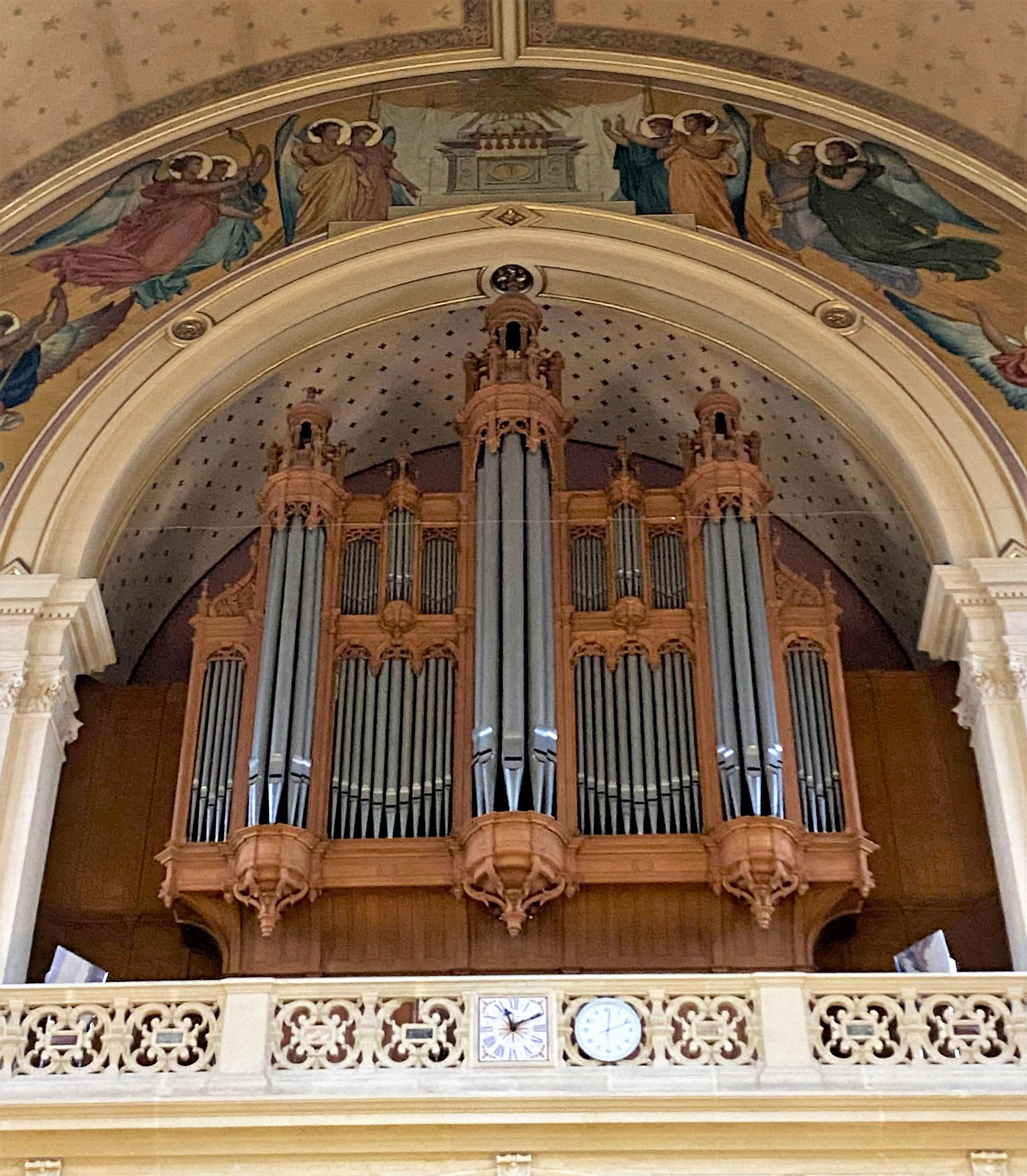
The main organ at Église de la Sainte-Trinité, where Olivier Messiaen was organist

Messe de la Pentecôte ("Pentecost Mass") is an organ mass composed by Olivier Messiaen in 1949–50. According to the composer, it is based on twenty years of improvising at Église de la Sainte-Trinité, where Messiaen was organist since 1931.

Messiaen himself wrote that the work "corresponds almost exactly with the length of a low Mass, and its sections are intended to match with those of the service. The music shows different aspects of the mystery of Pentecost, the Feast of the Holy Spirit." The work was never officially premiered; Messiaen included it discreetly in the celebration of the Eucharist on the Pentecost Sunday of 1951 (13 May).

The work is in five movements:

1. Entrée (Les langues de feu) – Entrance
2. Offertoire (Les choses visibles et invisibles) – Offertory
3. Consécration (Le don de Sagesse) – Consecration
4. Communion (Les oiseaux et les sources) – Communion
5. Sortie (Le vent de l'Esprit) – Recessional

The first movement uses "irrational values" applied to Greek rhythms. A motif from the fifth movement, labelled le vent ("the wind"), will reappear in Méditations sur le mystère de la Sainte Trinité as "Le Souffle de l'Esprit" (The Breath of the Spirit).

There is an "imaginary" birdsong in bars 50–57 of the second movement. This passage is derived from the lines for flute and clarinet in Jardin du sommeil d'amour in Turangalîla-Symphonie; Messiaen described these as melodic "garlands" that resemble birdsong in slow-motion. Several more bird songs are found in the fourth movement. Here, they are based on observation, and some of the species can be identified: a nightingale (mm. 201–205) and a blackbird (identical to the birdsong phrase from Ile de Feu 1).
