= Apparition de l'église éternelle =

Composition for organ by Olivier Messiaen

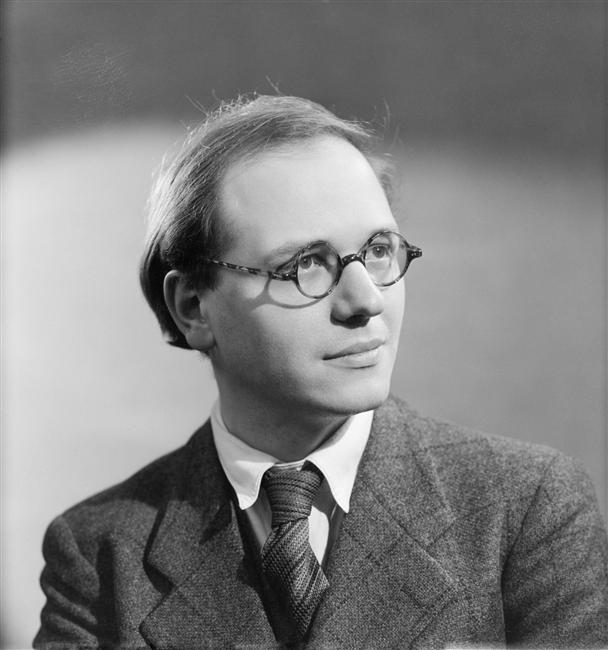
Olivier Messiaen in 1937

Apparition de l'église éternelle (Apparition of the eternal church) is a work for organ, written by the French composer Olivier Messiaen in 1932.

The piece is in arch form, beginning in pianissimo (pp) and building up to a fortississimo (fff) climax featuring a C major chord, and then receding back to pianissimo. Richly colored chords alternate with open fifths, on top of a throbbing bass which repeats a simple rhythmic pattern. Programmatically, the piece describes the appearance of the eternal church, which then fades away. This imagery has been compared to Dante's description of the inferno.

Messiaen described the piece by quoting from the hymn Cœlestis urbs Jerusalem: "Scissors, hammer, suffering, and tests, tailoring and polishing the elected persons, living stones of the spiritual edifice", stating that the throbbing bass depicts the incessant work of construction. He also wrote the following poem:

Made out of living stone,
Made out of heavenly stone,
It appears in heaven:
It is the Lamb's bride!
It is the heavenly church
Made out of heavenly stone
Which is the chosen's souls.
They are in God, and God is in them
For heavenly eternity!

Like Messiaen's early organ piece Le Banquet Céleste, the piece is in extremely slow tempo, and can take up to 10 minutes to perform.

== Film ==
Filmmaker and musician Paul Festa created the film Apparition of the Eternal Church which captures the responses of 31 artists and writers to the piece.

It is also featured during the elevator scene in Pedro Costa's 2014 film Horse Money.
