= Paul Kim (pianist) =

American classical pianist

Paul Kim is a Korean-American classical pianist.

Kim began his musical training in southern California and continued his studies at The Juilliard School. At the Manhattan School of Music he received his undergraduate and graduate degrees, and went on to earn a Ph.D. from New York University. Among his teachers include Paul Jacobs, Gary Graffman, Solomon Mikowsky and Jerome Lowenthal.

Besides his solo performing career as a concert pianist, Kim is also noted for his performances with his musical family. With his wife Judith Jeon, a soprano, Kim has performed widely in lieder recitals. In 1995, he and his son Matthew Kim made their debut as a father-and-son piano duo with a sold-out performance at Carnegie Hall. The duo has expanded with the addition of Kim's younger son, James. The trio of pianists, Paul Kim & Sons, has since performed throughout the world, often in benefit concerts for various social and charitable causes. Kim is president and co-founder of the Music Angels International Foundation. A profile of Kim's spiritual journey in music is featured in the book Creative Spirituality: The Way of the Artist written by Robert Wuthnow.

Kim is director of graduate music studies and professor of piano and music history at Long Island University LIU Post.

== Injury ==
In his later career Kim sustained an injury to his left hand. By playing through the injury it is believed that the condition triggered focal dystonia, a neurological disorder. In his case there was progressive loss of normal digital function, resulting in uncontrollable rigidity of the affected fingers. Pianists Gary Graffman and Leon Fleischer also had this disorder. In order to maintain his performances Kim experimented with an alternative and individualized system of fingering that he devised. He took a long and arduous path toward recovery with intensive physical rehabilitation and retraining of his hand and finger movements. While combating this disorder Kim still went on to complete one of his largest recording projects. His personal experience is recounted in the article “My Journey Through the Beethoven Symphonies.”

== Specializations ==
=== Olivier Messiaen ===
Kim is recognized as one of the leading specialists on the music of the French composer Olivier Messiaen. Among Kim's most notable achievements is his seven CD recording series comprising the complete piano works of Messiaen, released on the Centaur Records label. Included in the series are Messiaen's major compositions such as Catalogue d'oiseaux, Vingt regards sur l'enfant-Jésus, and the two-piano work Visions de l'Amen recorded with his son, Matthew Kim, who was 15 years old at that time.

Critics have noted Kim's interpretations with references to his scholarly perspectives, athletic and poetic pianism, and spiritual qualities. The pianist Yvonne Loriod, the late composer's wife and the foremost interpreter of his music, described Kim's performances as "perfect in every way — technique, rhythm, color, sonority, emotion."

=== Beethoven ===
Of particular importance are Kim's original solo piano transcriptions of Beethoven's nine symphonies, which he has also recorded. The first volume, the Ninth Symphony (in an arrangement for two pianos), was recorded with his son Matthew and released in 2008. These transcriptions stand in contrast to those written by Franz Liszt during the nineteenth century. While admired by many pianists, Liszt's arrangements have also been criticized for the ostentatious virtuoso effects and divergence from Beethoven's original intent. Kim's transcriptions closely follow the composer's original orchestral score, in both notes and manners of expression. Through the systematic study of Beethoven's piano writing style, Kim sought to invoke Beethoven's piano idiom in his transcription of the symphonies. He holds to the notion that Beethoven's orchestral writing is an extension of the pianistic.

The entire project was completed in 2020, in commemoration of the 250th anniversary of Beethoven's birth.

== Victim of Fraud ==
In 2007, it was revealed that Kim was among the classical pianists victimized by the recording scandal of Joyce Hatto. It was discovered that Hatto's recording of Messiaen's Vingt regards sur l'Enfant-Jésus was in fact Kim's recording of the same released by Centaur Records in 2002. A 2009 documentary film produced by Susannah Price in the UK entitled The Great Piano Scam investigated the fraud scheme and its impact on the world of classical music and the artists who were victimized.

== Discography ==
=== Messiaen: Complete Works for Piano ===
Centaur Records

- Vol. 1: Birdsong Compositions: Catalogue d'oiseaux, La Fauvette des jardins, and Petites esquisses d'oiseaux (2001), 3 CDs
- Vol. 2: Vingt Regards sur l’Enfant-Jésus (2002), 2 CDs
- Vol. 3: Visions de l’Amen, Quatre Études de rythme, and Cantéyodjayâ (2003)
- Vol. 4: The Early Works: Huit Préludes, Les offrandes oubliées, Fantaisie burlesque, Pièce pour le tombeau de Paul Dukas, Rondeau, Prélude (1964) pour Piano (2005)

=== Beethoven: Complete Symphonies Transcribed for Solo Piano by Paul Kim ===
Centaur Records

- Vol. 1: Symphony No. 9 (2008). Collaboration with Matthew Kim, piano
- Vol. 2: Symphonies Nos. 1 and 2 (2010)
- Vol. 3: Symphony No. 3 and 15 Variations with Fugue (2013). Collaboration with Matthew Kim, piano
- Vol. 4: Symphonies Nos. 4 and 5 (2017)
- Vol. 5: Symphony No. 6 and Piano Sonata No. 15 (2020)
- Vol. 6: Symphonies Nos. 7 and 8 (2020)

=== Other Recordings ===
- Stravinsky: Firebird and Petrouchka Suites, New York Philharmonic (LP, live recording 1978)
