= Grave (tempo) =

Tempo mark in music

Grave is a tempo mark and mood designation in music. The word originates in the Italian language and means solemn, heavy, or serious. The grave tempo is very slow at a pace of approximately 20-40 musical beats per minute.

== History ==
The term grave did not become widely associated with a tempo designation until the latter part of the 17th century. Earlier uses of the word grave were done as an adjective or descriptor of a work, but were not associated with a tempo marking. Examples of this earlier use would be Antonio Brunelli's Ballo grave (1616) and Biagio Marini's Symphonia grave (1617). In Venetian polychoral style of the Renaissance and Baroque music era the term grave had a unique musical meaning. This type of music employed two separate choruses divided by space and singing in alternation. The upper voiced choir was referred to as the acuto and the lower voiced choir was named grave.

Francesco Cavalli was among the first composers to use the word grave as a tempo marking, with that term being employed as a performance instruction within his opera Le nozze di Teti e di Peleo (1639). Other early examples of grave being used as a tempo term include Marco Uccellini's Sonate (1646), and Biagio Marini's Op. 22: Per ogni sorte di strumento musicale diversi generi di sonate, da chiesa, e da camera (1655). By the 1680s, the term was common in Italy with Henry Purcell writing in his preface to his Sonnata’s of III Parts (1683) that the term was widely used by Italian composers and musicians to refer to a "very slow movement" and that the term had spread to other parts of Europe.

While today the term grave is widely understood to be slower than the tempo terms largo and adagio, music theorists and composers of the 17th and 18th century were not so consistent in their interpretation and use of these terms, with some composers marking scores with grave but with performance descriptions described elsewhere that would indicate a speed more akin to modern tempos for largo or adagio.
