= Offrande au Saint Sacrement =

Composition for organ by Olivier Messiaen

- by Olivier Messiaen
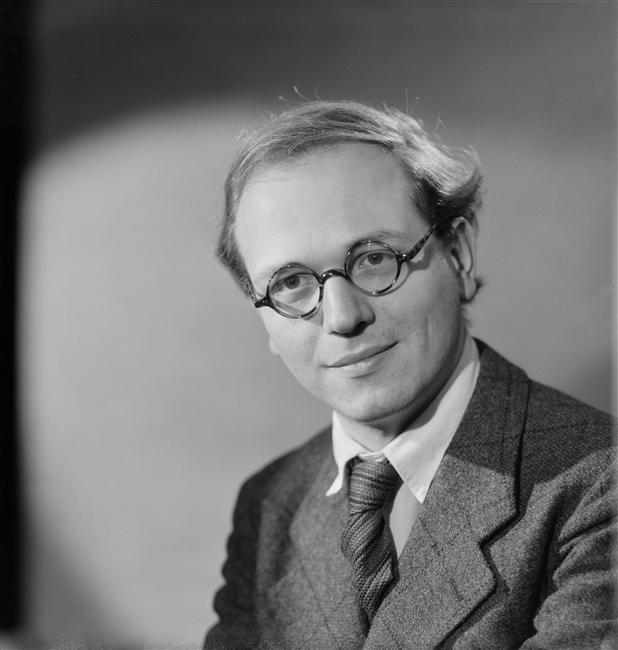
- Olivier Messiaen
- Composed: Unknown, probably 1928: Paris
- Published: 2001: Paris
- Scoring: Organ

Offrande au Saint Sacrement (Note: In the original manuscript, Messiaen specifically underlines Saint in 'Saint Sacrement', indicating that the proper title is Offrande au Saint Sacrement, and not Offrande au Saint-Sacrement.) (French: Offering to the Blessed Sacrament) is a meditation in A major for organ in two sections by French composer Olivier Messiaen. It is one of his earliest works for the instrument, and was posthumously published in 2001 following its discovery by Yvonne Loriod.

== Background ==
The Offrande was one of the works discovered by Yvonne Messiaen after the composer's death, together with his Prélude. Since the piece was not meant to be published and was discarded, there are very few details available about its origin. Organist Olivier Latry has suggested that the work may be contemporary with Le banquet céleste (1928), since the second theme from the Offrande shows some common elements. A part of this composition was rearranged for the orchestral piece Le banquet eucharistique, which was presumably written in 1928 and is now considered to be lost. The piece was published by Éditions Alphonse Leduc in 2001.

== Structure ==
This short piece for solo pipe organ has a total duration of 5 minutes and 34 bars. It is in the key of A major and is marked "Lent" (Slow) in the score. The piece is structured into two sections, the second one being a more developed repetition of the first one. In each section, there is an introductory subsection that is followed by a second one, which displays features of Baroque chorale preludes.

== Recordings ==
Since this piece was not initially intended for publication, it has been performed rarely and remains one of the lesser-known works by Messiaen. The following is a list of notable recordings of the piece:

Organ	Record company	Year of recording	Format
Olivier Latry	Deutsche Grammophon	2002	CD
Hans-Ola Ericsson	BIS	2009	CD
