= Monodie =

Composition by Olivier Messiaen

- by Olivier Messiaen
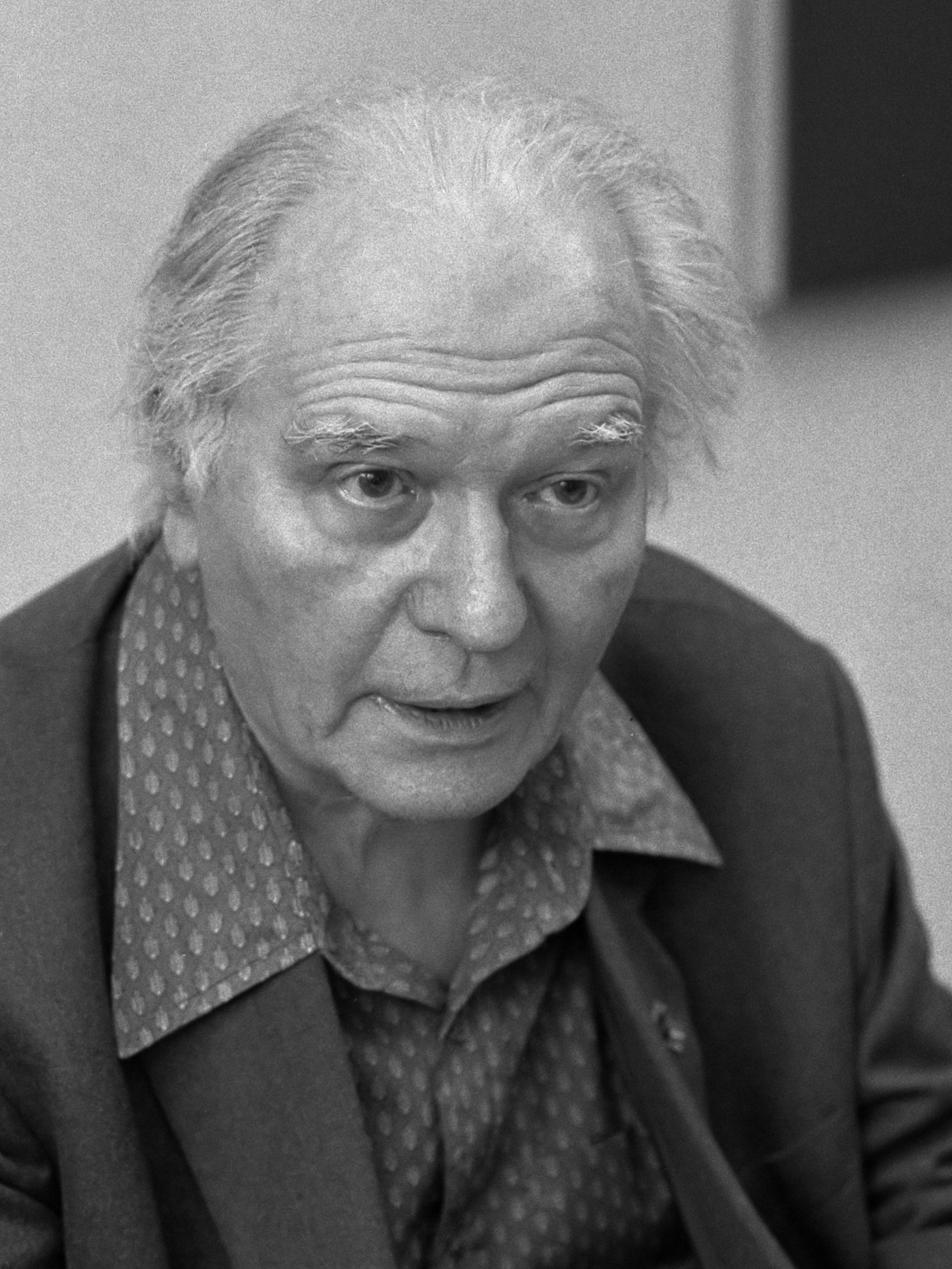
- Olivier Messiaen in 1986
- Catalogue: A.44
- Composed: 1963: Paris
- Performed: 19 May 1998: London
- Published: 1997: Paris
- Scoring: Organ

Monodie (French for 'Monody'), written in 1963, is a brief composition for organ by French composer Olivier Messiaen. It is his shortest stand-alone published work.

== Background ==
The Monodie was composed in 1963 at the request of Jean Bonfils, who was Messiaen's assistant at the church of the Sainte Trinité, Paris, where he was the main organist. Its holograph manuscript states it was written 'for harmonium'.

It was written for Bonfils' and Noémie Pierrot's organ method book, Nouvelle méthode de clavier. Messiaen presumably did not have his own organ at La Trinité because of a major refurbishment, therefore being relegated to the choir organ. It was then published as a part of that book in 1963 by the Schola Cantorum. Musicologist Nigel Simeone alleges that Messiaen could have composed the Monodie as a part of a sight-reading examination at the Schola Cantorum.

The piece was later republished posthumously by Éditions Alphonse Leduc in 1997, as most other short works that were lost, forgotten, or never intended for publication. It was formally premièred on May 19, 1998, at Westminster Cathedral, in London, with Gillian Weir at the organ, although this was certainly not the first time it was ever played.

== Structure ==
According to its score, the Monodie has a total duration of 6 minutes and a total of 17 bars of variable length. However, if the length and tempo are strictly followed, it would last under three minutes.

As was customary in many works by Messiaen, the piece bears neither time nor key signature. It starts with a single staff (as opposed to a three-staff system, which is typical of organ works). Messiaen used the tempo marking "Très modéré". The stop configuration used in the piece is stable throughout: Flute 8 (or Quintaton 16), Cor de Nuit 8, Nazard 2 2/3, and Octavin 2. The piece features multiple triplets, quintuplets and sextuplets.

Its fingering is completely indicated.

== Recordings ==
Following is a list of some notable recordings:

Organ	Record company	Year of recording	Format
Olivier Latry	Deutsche Grammophon	2002	CD
Gillian Weir	Priory Records	2004	CD
Jolanda Zwoferink	Prestare	2010	CD
