= La Nativité du Seigneur =

Organ composition by Olivier Messiaen

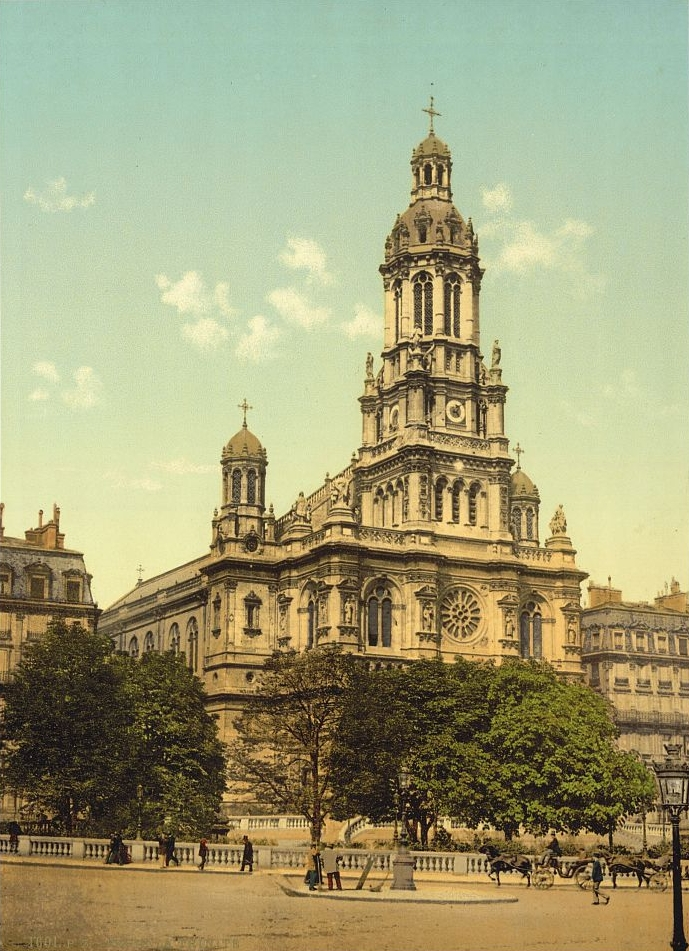
La Trinité, Paris, where Messiaen was titular organist; the venue of the work's 1936 première.

La Nativité du Seigneur, neuf méditations pour orgue (The Birth of the Lord, nine meditations for organ) is a suite for organ written by the French composer Olivier Messiaen in 1935 in Grenoble.

The work is a testament to Messiaen's Roman Catholic faith. It is divided into nine "meditations" inspired by the birth of Jesus. In volume one, Messiaen outlines his inspirations, theological, instrumental and compositional. As the composer notes in his preface, he sought "the emotion and sincerity first". The work was written by the composer at the age of 26, during the summer of 1935 while he was in residence at Grenoble near the French Alps. Messiaen wrote that in addition to theology, the movements were inspired by the mountains, as well as the stained glass windows in medieval cathedrals.

The work's premiere on 27 February 1936 on the organ of La Trinité, Paris, where Messiaen was titular organist; had the work split among three players: Jean-Yves Daniel-Lesur (1–3), Jean Langlais (4–6), and Jean-Jacques Grunenwald (7–9).

Messiaen would follow up with another organ cycle, Les corps glorieux, in 1939.

== Structure ==
The work is in nine movements, each depicting an image or concept from the birth of Jesus.

1. La vierge et l'enfant (The Virgin and Child) (approx. 6 1/2 minutes)
2. Les bergers (The Shepherds) (approx. 7 minutes)
3. Desseins éternels (Eternal purposes) (approx. 6 minutes)
4. Le verbe (The Word) (approx. 14 minutes)
5. Les enfants de Dieu (The Children of God) (approx. 4 minutes)
6. Les anges (The Angels) (approx. 3 minutes)
7. Jésus accepte la souffrance (Jesus accepts suffering) (approx. 4 1/2 minutes)
8. Les mages (The Magi) (approx. 6 1/2 minutes)
9. Dieu parmi nous (God among us) (approx. 9 minutes)

In publication (by Éditions Alphonse Leduc), the work was originally divided over four books; Book I consists of the first three movements, Book II of 4 and 5, Book III of 6, 7, and 8, and IV for 9 alone. A combined volume of the complete work was published in 2023.

The work is one of the earliest of Messiaen's compositions to feature elements that were to become key to his later compositions, such as the extensive use of the composer's own modes of limited transposition, as well as the influence of birdsong, and the meters and rhythms of Ancient Greek and traditional Indian music.

In 1967, Richard Franko Goldman wrote, "One is, indeed, tempted to say that the work is a masterpiece, and one of the great organ works of all time. It is certainly monumental and impressive, original and memorable, with or without the theoretical and mystical explanation the composer himself gives out."
