= Paul Kim & Sons =

Paul Kim & Sons is a trio of pianists led by Paul Kim, an American classical pianist. The ensemble is composed of the father and sons pianists Paul Kim, Matthew Kim and James Kim. In 1995, Paul and Matthew Kim made their formal debut as a father-and-son piano duo with a sold-out performance at Carnegie Hall. With the addition of the younger son James, the trio has performed in benefit concerts around the world for the Music Angels International Foundation.

The trio is known for performing a wide repertoire of works from the classical canon, twentieth-century avant-garde compositions, jazz standards and musicals. The instrumental arrangements written by Paul Kim for their performances range from one piano with four hands, two pianos with four hands, to two pianos with six hands.

Among the recordings members of the group have released include Vision de l’Amen by Olivier Messiaen, as well as Symphony No. 9 and 15 Variations with Fugue by Ludwig van Beethoven.
