= La Fauvette des jardins =

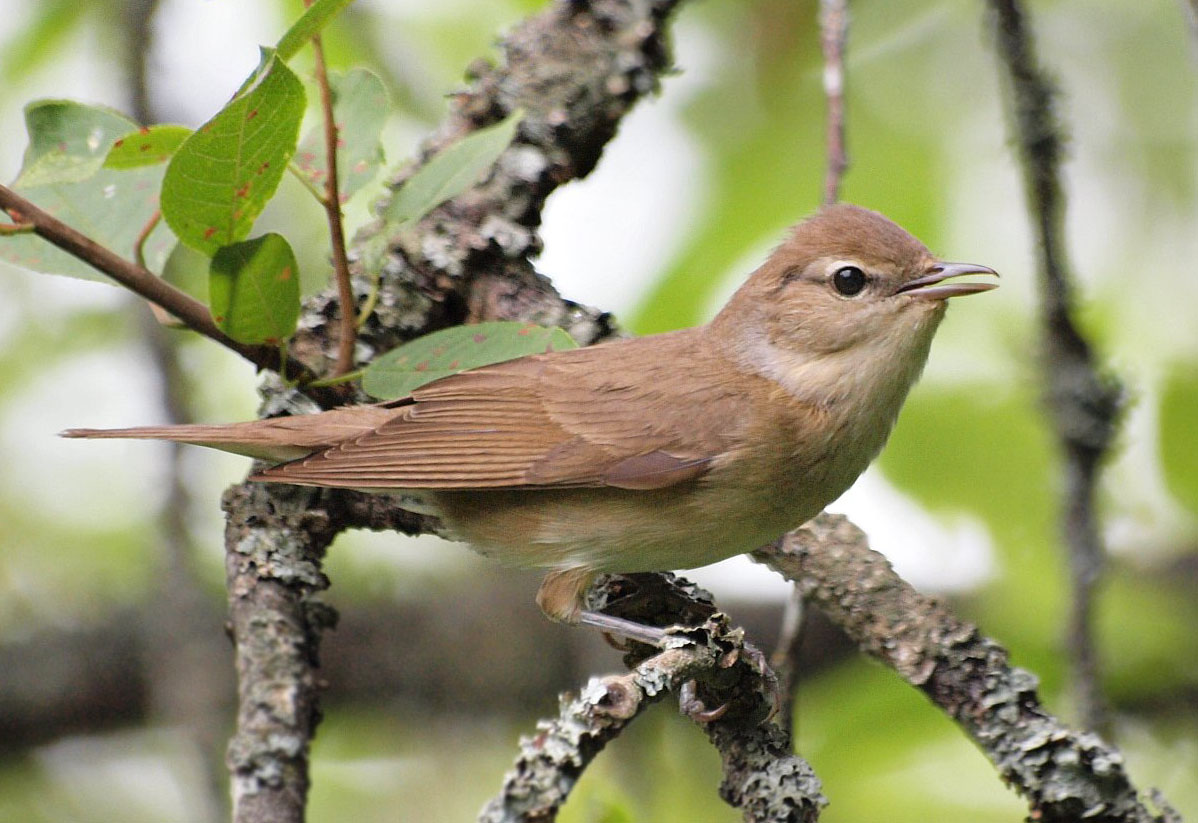
The garden warbler (Sylvia borin) makes up for its drab appearance with its melodic song

Male garden warbler singing in Surrey, England

La Fauvette des jardins is a work for piano by the French composer Olivier Messiaen, written in 1970. The piece is based principally on the song of the garden warbler, the French name of which is the title of the composition, but features eighteen other birds. The imagined setting of the piece is the Dauphiny mountains of Isère during a mid-summer night and the following day.
