= Méditations sur le Mystère de la Sainte Trinité =

Méditations sur le Mystère de la Sainte Trinité (French: "Meditations on the Mystery of the Holy Trinity") is a suite for organ by Olivier Messiaen. The Méditations were composed from 1967 to 1969 at Messiaen's house in Pétichet.

The first private performance of the piece took place in Paris on November 8, 1971, at the Sainte-Trinité. Messiaen gave the first public performance on March 20, 1972, at the National Shrine of the Immaculate Conception in Washington, D.C.

== Structure ==
The work comprises nine untitled meditations ranging from 3 to 10 minutes long each. A complete performance of the whole composition is around 75 minutes long. Prior to each movement, Messiaen describes the musical content and its symbolism.

=== Meditation No. 1 ===
The first piece presented in this composition is sometimes called "Le Père des étoiles" (The Father of Stars). It is long and varied, marked Lent at the beginning of the piece. Its structure can be broken down as follows:

- Theme: The main melodic line presented is called "le Père des étoiles", played fff and legato, with both hands in unison.
- Variation I: The left hand on the Grand orgue and Positif plays the melody from the theme, while the right hand on the Récit plays a melodic counterpoint which is completely disconnected from the main melody.
- Variation II: Main melody repeated again, this time on the pedal. The counterpoint, which consists of short, rapid chords, is played on the keyboard.
- Langage communicable: "Par rapport aux Personnes qui procedent de lui, le Père se notifie ainsi: paternité et spiration; en tant que "Principe qui n'a pas de principe", il se notifie ainsi: il n'est pas d'un autre: c'est là précisément la propriete d'innascibilité, désignée par le nom d'Inengendré" (Thus therefore the Father is known both by paternity and by common spiration, as regards the persons proceeding from Himself. But as the principle, not from a principle He is known by the fact that He is not from another; and this belongs to the property of innascibility, signified by the word "Unbegotten.") The langage is played on the Positif and the counterpoint is played on the Grand orgue. The text is taken from Thomas Aquinas's Summa Theologica, Part I, question 33, article 4, conclusion.
- The stars start turning. The main theme is presented again ostinato on the pedal, on a 10-note sequence. Meanwhile, the two hands play two different chord ostinatos: the right hand plays an 8-chord ostinato sequence and the left hand plays a 9-chord sequence.
- Short crescendo sequence based on the rotating chords from the previous section, now contracted and transposed.
- Langage communicable: the pedal proclaims the main word from the previous langage communicable: "L'inengendré" (the Unbegotten).

=== Meditation No. 2 ===
The second movement is divided into two parts and a conclusion. It revolves around the holiness of God. The second part repeats the sequence from the first part, although with a different music in all sections except the first. It can be broken down as follows:

- Part I
  - Dieu est Saint (God is Holy): The plainsong melody Alleluia de la Dedicace (Hallelujah of the Dedication) is played in unison with all the manuals coupled together.
  - Theme of Christ: Further explained with chords (Theme of Christ) and a quotation from the Gloria of the Ordinary of the Mass: "Vous êtes le seul Saint, le seul Seigneur, le seul Très-Haut: Jésus-Christ" (you alone are the Holy One, you alone are the Lord, you alone are the Most High, Jesus Christ). The initial confusion caused by the complex chords used is resolved into light with the A major chord at the end of the section.
  - Song of the troglodyte: The first bird featured in the composition.
  - Theme of Christ: Although presented for the second time, the chords here are different, ending on the A major's dominant.
  - Song of the merle noir, played on the flûtes 8, 4.
  - Song of the pinson, played on bourdon 16, tierce and cymbale, with an accelerated sound, a central trill and a final codetta.
  - Song of the fauvette des jardins, a lengthy section played on the manual
  - Song of the fauvette à tete noire, played very softy over an A major chord.
- Part II
  - Dieu est Saint: Alleluia de la Dedicace played again.
  - Theme of Christ. This time, the chords are different and do not finish on the A major chord.
  - Song of the troglodyte.
  - Theme of Christ.
  - Song of the merle noir.
  - Song of the pinson. Same music except the codetta.
  - Song of the fauvette des jardins.
  - Song of the fauvette à tete noire.
- Conclusion
  - Dieu est Saint: The Alleluia de la Dedicace is played for the last time, but it is broken off before it's finished. After a long pause, the theme is reprised with a pp harmonized accompaniment.
  - Song of the bruant jaune, which closes the piece.

=== Meditation No. 3 ===
This movement revolves around Langage communicable and features only one sentence taken, again, from Thomas Aquinas's Summa Theologica, Part I, question 28, article 2, conclusion: "La relation réelle en Dieu est réellement identique à l’essence" (Relation really existing in God is really the same as His essence). The structure in this movement is slightly different. It is the shortest movement of the composition, only three pages long, and the elements presented are superimposed and not sequenced as in other meditations. The langage communicable is presented by the right hand on the Récit. The left hand, on the other hand, plays a succession of rhythmic talas in chords: first, pratâpaçekhara in two different versions; then, râgavardhana; then, varnamanthikâ. These rhythmic structures are then repeated until the end of the piece and represent a counterpoint to the main melody. The final tala, rangapradîpaka, is played on the pedals until the piece is finished. The cells repeated do not always match exactly, but the intervals used are similar in each cell repetition.

=== Meditation No. 4 ===
With the sentence "Il est" (He is), this meditation deals with the idea of the existence of God. Its structure can be summarized as follows:

- Song of the pic noir: After a series of three rapid chords and a low-pitched, deep chord, the song of the black woodpecker is presented. According to Messiaen, this is a typical song heard in the Vosges, in the Alps near the Dauphiné region.
- Song of the merle à plastron: Marked Très modéré in the score.
- Song of the chouette de Tengmalm.
- Song of the pic noir.
- Trill transition.
- Trio: The three themes referencing the Father, the Son, and the Holy Spirit are presented in a trio using three talas: râgavardhana for the Father, pratâpaçekhara for the Son, and simhavikrama for the Holy Spirit.
- Trill transition.
- Song of the pic noir.
- Song of the grive musicienne: A long solo by the song thrush, lasting for more than a minute. The melodic line here is unaccompanied but with occasional chords. Its themes are repeated three times with different changes in timbre and attack.
- Song of the pic noir.
- Trill transition.
- Song of the merle à plastron.
- Je suis (I am): The most important section in the movement is introduced by a biblical quotation found in Exodus 34:6: "Et "Je suis" passa devant lui en criant: "Je suis", "Je suis" !" (And 'I am' passed in front of him shouting: 'I am', 'I am'). An iambic rhythm (representing the words "je suis") are played ff, which a quasi-glissando and a rapidly descending succession of chords, followed by a long pause.
- Song of the chouette de Tengmalm, which moves away expressing the world's creatures littleness in the presence of God.

=== Meditation No. 5 ===
In this meditation, Messiaen deals with divine attributes or, in other words, what God is. It is the longest meditation in the cycle and is structured as follows:

- First section
  - Dieu est immense (God is immense): The theme of God is presented as a solo. According to Messiaen, the absence of specific place is a profound mystery, which is why he chose to present the theme in the low register of the organ.
  - Dieu est éternel (God is eternal): A couple of bars with chord colors. This is meant to be pictured as a sparkle, with contracted, rotating chords that give off a primarily bright golden yellow color, along with purple, gray, some brown, red, and pale green.
  - Dieu est immuable (God is unchanging): A calm and solemn melody on talas candrakalâ and lakskmîça, which symbolize peace and beauty.
  - Le souffle de l'Esprit (The breath of the Spirit): As the scriptures give the Holy Spirit a sense of wind and breath, the music is a rapid succession of notes used in the main theme of the Father and the Son in meditations Nos. 1 and 8 in the composition, as the Holy Spirit comes from both the Father and the Son.
  - A trill and rapid melodic section ensues before transitioning to the second section.
- Second section
  - Dieu est immense: The theme of God is repeated in its entirety.
  - Dieu est éternel: Even though the title remains the same, the musical content is different.
  - Dieu est immuable: The same rhythm is used while the harmonic structure is transposed.
  - Le souffle de l'Esprit (The breath of the Spirit): Same melodic structure transposed.
  - A trill and rapid melodic section similar to the one in the first section ensues before transitioning to the third section.
- Third section
  - Le Père tout puissant (The Almighty Father): Short two-bar fragment.
  - Notre Père (Our Father): Short two-bar fragment. These two fragments also deal with two different "aspects" of God.
- Fourth section
  - Le souffle de l'Esprit: A long toccata with fast intervals and staccato chords on the manual and the theme of God on the pedals fff. This long segment ends on the D dominant.
- Fifth section
  - Dieu est éternel: After the staccato section, the shining light motif used in the first and second sections reappears and is repeated five times, with transpositions. These transpositions shift the color used in the chords: golden yellow, Chartres blue, violet, green-red, orange, amethyst purple, mauve, and pearl gray. This is always on the D dominant, so that the next section starts with a G.
  - Le Père tout puissant: This short section is transposed
  - Notre Père: This short section is also transposed while playing a D on the pedal, indicating we are still on the D dominant.
  - Le Père tout puissant: This section is repeated, although the music varies slightly.
  - Notre Père: This section is also transposed and modified while sustaining the previous D.
- Sixth section
  - Dieu est amour (God is love): With the quotation "Et Jesus dit: "Il n'est pas de plus grand amour que de donner sa vie pour ceux qu'on aime" (And Jesus said: "He is no greater love than to give your life for those you love."), extracted from John 15:13, Messiaen introduces the last section in this movement. A calm, slow and harmonically dense section, it ends on the G major chord.
  - Song of the bruant jaune, also used in Meditation No. 2 to close the piece.

=== Meditation No. 6 ===
This movement is dedicated to the Son, the second element in the Holy Trinity. It is divided into two parts:

- Part I
  - Offertoire de l'Épiphanie (Offertory of the Epiphany): This fragment features the plainsong Reges Tharsis. It cites a passage from the Bible, John 1:4: "Dans le Verbe était la Vie et la Vie était la Lumière..." (In the Word was life and in life was light). The melody is presented without accompaniment and has intermissions between different musical phrases, with color chords.
  - Graduel de l'Épiphanie (Gradual of the Epiphany): This segment also features another plainsong: Omnes de Saba, with its verse "Surge illuminare". This melody is played in tritones with accompaniment, although harmony gets more colorful and complex later on.
  - Alleluia de l'Épiphanie (Hallelujah of the Epiphany): The third element of plainsong, Alleluia, is used with colorful chords and ff, finishing on the C dominant. It quotes Hebrews 1:3 from the Bible: "Le Fils, resplendissement de la gloire du Père!" (The Son, shining glory of the Father).
- Part II
  - Offertoire de l'Épiphanie (Offertory of the Epiphany).
  - Graduel de l'Épiphanie (Gradual of the Epiphany): This section is more developed and ends on C major.
  - Alleluia de l'Épiphanie (Hallelujah of the Epiphany).

=== Meditation No. 7 ===
This meditation is divided into three parts:

- Introduction.
  - Seven enigmatic chords are played pp.
  - Song of an unknown bird from Persepolis: This is a transcription that Messiaen took while visiting the Apadana, in Persepolis, Iran. As the composer explained, the bird is unknown because Messiaen could not have visual contact with it.
  - Horn effect: the effect of horns is reproduced in a series of color chords.
- Body of the piece in langage communicable: Written as a trio, it features different themes as well as the langage communicable. The right hand on the positif plays the song of the bulbul; the pedal uses a melody with diminishing rhythmical values in pairs, the sequence being 5, 5, 4, 4, 3, 3, 2, 2, 1, 1, 1, and a long note (each number being a sixteenth note in the score); the left hand, finally, presents the sentence in langage communicable on the récit. The sentence to be transliterated is "Le Père et le Fils aiment, par le Saint-Esprit (l'Amour qui procéde), eux-mémes et nous." (The Father and the Son love each other and us, by the Holy Ghost, or by Love proceeding), and is taken from Thomas Aquinas's Summa Theologica, Part I, question 37, article 2, conclusion.
- Coda
  - The chords from the introduction are reprised in a retrograde sequence.
  - Song of an unknown bird from Persepolis: This fragment is musically different from the previous one.
  - Horn effect: the effect of horns is reproduced again, this time as they move away. It finishes on E major.

=== Meditation No. 8 ===
The eighth meditation deals with the only adjective missing from God's description in the fifth movement: "Dieu est simple" (God is simple). It is a slow and calm movement, a preparation for the intense movement that follows it. It is structured as follows:

- First section.
  - Alleluia de la Toussaint (Hallelujah of All Saints): Another plainsong melody is used without accompaniment on the positif.
  - Les Trois sont Un (The Three are One): A three-fold ternary structure: first, dotted inner value; then, a shorter inner value; finally, dotted outer values.
  - Père (Father): Presented as a monody.
  - Fils (Son): Presented as a monody.
  - Esprit (Spirit): Presents God's theme as a monody.
  - Cry of Saint Paul: With the quotation "Ô profondeur des richesses de la sagesse et de la science de Dieu!" (O, the depth of the riches of the wisdom and knowledge of God!), found in Romans 11:33, Messiaen gives a short preparation for the next section, playing a short segment on the positif.
  - A downward cascade of chords ensues.
  - A diminuendo played pp on the tala miçravarna closes the section.
- Second section.
  - Alleluia de la Toussaint:
  - Les Trois sont Un: This section is now expanded and slightly more varied.
  - Père.
  - Fils.
  - Esprit. These three sections are an exact repetition.
  - Cry of Saint Paul.
  - A downward cascade of chords ensues, this time expanded and with a short ostinato sequence at the end.
  - The diminuendo fragment from the previous section is repeated.
- Third section.
  - Alleluia de la Toussaint: This time, the theme is presented with a harmonic accompaniment, with a quotation from the Bible, found in Matthew 11:28: "Vous tous qui êtes chargés et fatigués, venez à moi." (All of you who are loaded and tired, come to me).
- Fourth section.
  - Using the last words from the Alleluia, a bridge section leads to the ending of this movement, played pp. Another passage from the Bible is quoted, this time from Matthew 11:30: "Et Jésus dit: Mon joug est suave et mon fardeau léger." (And Jesus said: My yoke is sweet and my burden is light).
  - A diatonic series of harmonies closes the movement, with a new quotation from the Bible, found in Psalms 55:6: "Qui me donnera des ailes, comme à la colombe? Je m'envolerai et me reposerai..." (Who will give me wings, like the dove? I will fly away and rest).
  - Song of the bruant jaune, which closes the movement, as in Meditations Nos. 2 and 5.

=== Meditation No. 9 ===
The last meditation revolves around the name God gives himself at the burning bush. It is structured as follows:

- Je suis Celui qui suis (I am who I am): God's theme is presented fff. The quotation, extracted from Exodus 3:14, is the central topic of the movement. The theme is followed by two powerful color chords dominated by blue-purple, with sparkles of orange-red, reddish-brown, violet, green, and silver.
- Song of the fauvette des jardins.
- Song of the fauvette à tete noire, harmonized over an extended A major chord.
- Song of the fauvette des jardins.
- Transition moving upwards with fifth chords, crescendo until the end.
- Je suis Celui qui suis, presented for the second time.
- Toccatas: A series of brief, fragmentary toccatas follow. This sequence is the lengthiest in the movement and contains many different fragments that are related to the main themes in the composition.
- Je suis Celui qui suis, presented for the third time. This is the climax of the whole composition. The color chords are repeated and transposed three times.
- Transition. After a long silence, the transition moves downwards with fifth chords, diminuendo until the end.
- Song of the fauvette des jardins.
- Song of the fauvette à tete noire.
- Song of the fauvette des jardins.
- Song of the fauvette à tete noire.
- Song of the bruant jaune. As in Meditations Nos. 2, 5, and 8, the yellowhammer closes the piece with the chord used to harmonize the previous section, the song of the blackcap. The enigmatic last chord is sustained for a very long time, according to Messiaen's specifications.

== Composition method ==
The composition method used by Messiaen featured several recognizable items that he went on to develop throughout his life and used in other works.

=== Langage communicable ===
One of the main traits of Messiaen's mid-to-late works for organ was the musical cryptogram langage communicable (Communicable Language). This was created out of Messiaen's frustration with the nature of music not being able to express meaning per se: while language was created as an instrument for communication, and language is not necessarily oral or written, but can also be expressed with images, colors, movements, among others, music is incapable of expressing meaning. According to Messiaen, music can arouse feelings and affect states of mind, but it is unable to say anything, to inform with precision. Messiaen also cites Richard Wagner as one of the precursors of communicable language, since he put forward the leitmotiv in his Ring cycle. By using music in a specific way, he could attract the listener's attention to the different elements he wanted to introduce. In his opinion, it is often effective at communicating since it is based on convention, as listeners need to know the leitmotifs in advance in order to grasp the content of his work.

Messiaen, a deeply religious man, believed that angels had a system of communication that transcended language, inasmuch as language for angels is outside time and place. For that reason, and in order not to fall into the trap of giving hidden meanings to sounds, he created a musical language where specific notes of specific durations represent letters, words, and even ideas. The language content is a mere transliteration of texts in French. Messiaen used the first musical notes used in the BACH motif and in Robert Schumann's Carnaval's use of the SCHA motifs, based on the German musical alphabet. Since notes further from H are not universally accepted, he proposed his own method based on the premise "un son, un régistre, une durée" (one sound, one register, one duration). This is the complete alphabet:

- A: Eighth note A3.
- B: Dotted eighth note B♭3.
- C: Eighth note C4.
- D: Eighth note D4.
- E: Sixteenth note E4.
- F: Dotted quarter note F4.
- G: Dotted eighth note G4.
- H: Dotted eighth note B3.
- I: Sixteenth note F♯5.
- J: Sixteenth note F♯4.
- K: Eighth note C2.
- L: Eighth note E♭4.
- M: Half note A♭4.
- N: Quarter note tied to dotted eighth note E♭3.
- O: Half note tied to dotted eighth note B4.
- P: Quarter note G2.
- Q: Eighth note C3.
- R: Dotted eighth note E5.
- S: Quarter note F5.
- T: Half note tied to sixteenth note D1.
- U: Quarter note tied to sixteenth note C♯2.
- V: Eighth note D3.
- W: Eighth note D5.
- X: Eighth note G♯3.
- Y: Sixteenth note F♯3.
- Z: Quarter note F2.

To make the language simpler and avoid word accumulation, all articles, pronouns, adverbs, and prepositions were deleted. By keeping only nouns, adjectives, and verbs, he used Latin declension and communicated the case before each word by means of a musical formula. He also created a sequence for the verb "be", "have" and for the concept of God. The two concepts "to be" (a downward movement, since "all that is comes from God") and "to have" (an upward movement, since "we can always have more by lifting ourselves up to God") are represented by completely opposite melodic formulas. The musical theme for God is also presented in the retrograde inversion. The sequences are as follows:

- Genitive, ablative, and locative cases: Dotted eighth note E♭3 / Dotted eighth note F3 / Dotted eighth note E4 / Quarter note tied to sixteenth note F♯4.
- Accusative and dative cases: Dotted eighth note F3 / Dotten eighth note B♭3 / Dotted eighth note E4 / Quarter note tied to sixteenth note E♭3.
- Privative case: Sixteenth note A4 / Eighth note B♭3.
- Être (To be): Dotted eighth note D♯5 / Dotted eighth note C♯5 / Dotted eighth note D4.
- Avoir (To have): Dotted eighth note F♯3 / Dotted eighth note G♯3 / Dotted eighth note G4.
- Dieu (God): Whole note B4 / Eighth note A4 / Sixteenth note E♭4 / Eighth note A♭3 / Eighth note B♭3 / Eighth note E4 / Dotted eighth note F♯4 / Quarter note G3 / Half note C♯3.

=== Birdsong ===
Birdsong is also one of the main traits in Messiaen's music and was used extensively in his musical output. The birds featured in this composition are presented in the following list in order of appearance:

- Troglodyte.
- Merle noir.
- Pinson.
- Fauvette des jardins.
- Fauvette à tete noire.
- Bruant jaune.
- Pic noir.
- Merle à plastron.
- Chouette de Tengmalm.
- Grive musicienne.
- An unnamed bird from Persepolis, Iran (later identified as a Bulbul des jardins).
- Bulbul.
