= Preludes (Messiaen) =

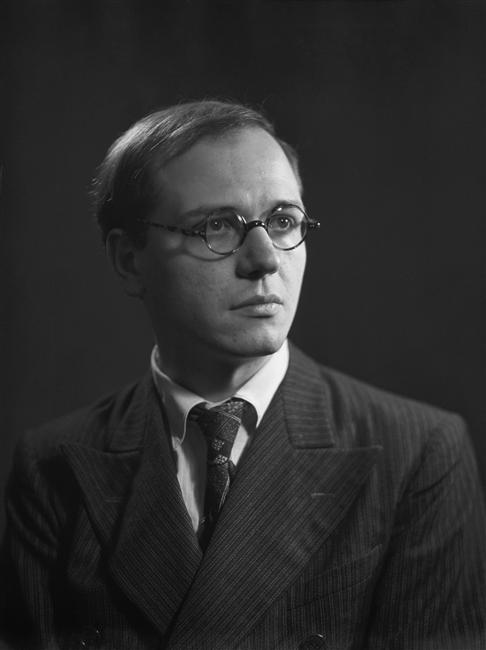
Olivier Messiaen in 1937

The Préludes (Preludes) are a 1928–1929 set of eight pieces by French composer Olivier Messiaen, which were written when the composer was 20 years old and studying at the Conservatoire de Paris. Messiaen considered it to be his first work of any value. The compositions are based on Messiaen's modes of limited transposition, and betray an influence of Debussy's preludes.

They were premiered by the composer in a private performance at the Concerts Durand in Paris on 28 January 1930. The first public performance was given by Henriette Puig-Roget on 1 March 1930, at the Salle Érard at the Société Nationale de Musique in Paris.

== Table of contents ==
There are eight preludes, which take about thirty-four minutes to play in full:

	Original title	English Translation	Description
1	La colombe	The Dove	Orange, with violet veins.
2	Chant d'extase dans un paysage triste	Song of Ecstasy in a Sad Landscape	Grey, mauve, Prussian blue at the beginning and end; diamond and silver at the middle.
3	Le nombre léger	The Light Number	Orange, with violet veins.
4	Instants défunts	Bygone Moments	Smooth grey with reflections of mauve and green.
5	Les sons impalpables du rêve	The Impalpable Sounds of a Dream	Polymodal, consisting of a blue-orange mode with a chordal ostinato and cascades of chords, and a violet-purple mode having a copper timbre. Note the pianistic writing, composed of triple notes, rapid passages in chords, canon in contrary motion, hand crossing, various staccatos, brassy louré, gem effects.
6	Cloches d'angoisse et larmes d'adieu	Bells of Anguish and Tears of Farewell	In memory of the composer's mother, poetess Cécile Sauvage. The bells combine several different modes: the "hum" (deep bass) and the upper harmonies of the bells sound with luminous vibrations. The farewell is purple, orange, violet.
7	Plainte calme	Gentle Lament	Smooth gray with reflections of mauve and green.
8	Un reflet dans le vent	A Reflection in the Wind	The small storm which opens and concludes the piece alternates veins of orange, and green with black stains. The central development section is more luminous. The second theme, very melodious, and wrapped in sinuous arpeggios, is blue-orange in its first occurrence, and green-orange in its second one. Violet, orange and purple dominate the entire piece.
