= Le Banquet céleste =

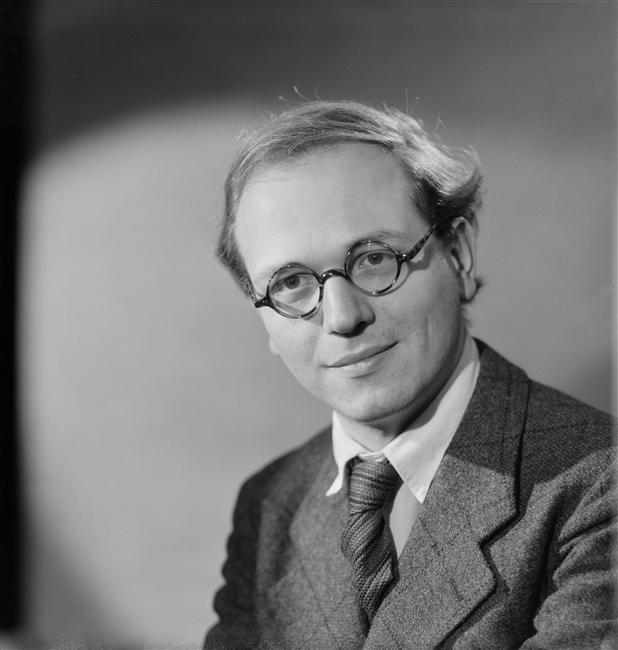
Olivier Messiaen in 1937

Le Banquet céleste (The Heavenly Banquet or The Celestial Banquet) is a work for organ, written by the French composer Olivier Messiaen in 1928. It is based on the slow movement of an earlier unfinished orchestral work Le Banquet eucharistique dating from 1926–1927.

The work is published by Éditions Alphonse Leduc, and was revised in 1960, which Leduc also published.

== Analysis ==
The work's epigraph, "He that eateth my flesh and drinketh my blood dwelleth in me and I in him" (John 6:56), indicates that the work is intended for Communion. The work is written in an octatonic scale, one of Messiaen's modes of limited transposition. To avoid tonal monotony, Messiaen transposes the mode every few measures.

Despite being only 25 bars long, it takes about 7–8 minutes to perform, due to the extremely slow tempo ("very slow, ecstatic"). The work has two themes: the first, marked "far away, mysterious", is slow and sustained. The second, played by the pedal, but at 4' pitch (drawing a stop one octave above notated pitch) and above, is marked "brief staccato, as a water drop", and represents Christ's blood. The final chord is accompanied by a 32' bass note, marked "very deep". (A stop at 32’ pitch is two octaves below the notated pitch.)
