= Harawi (Messiaen) =

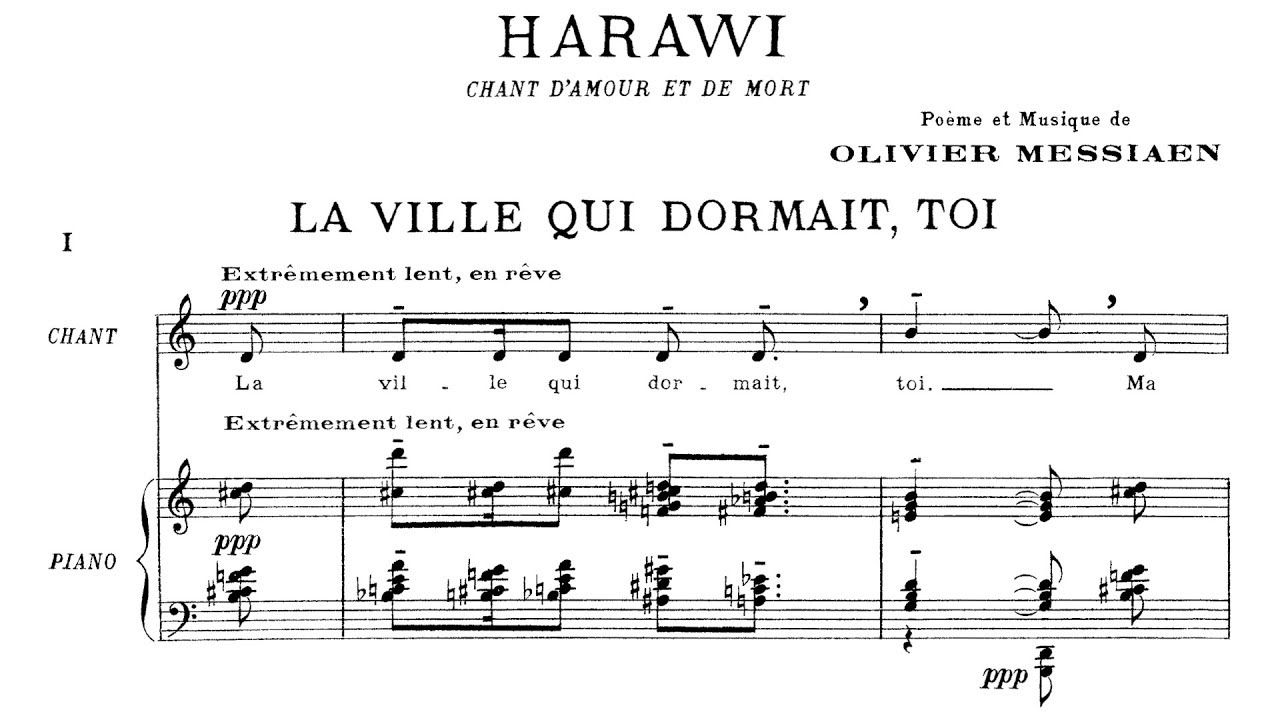
Incipit

Harawi – Chant d'amour et de mort ("Harawi – A Song of Love and Death") are a song cycle for "grand, dramatic" soprano and piano whose music and libretto were composed by Olivier Messiaen in 1945. They are considered to be the first part of his Tristan trilogy, a collection of works inspired by the myth of Tristan and Iseult.

The cycle of twelve songs, written in the composer's native language of French and occasionally featuring words in Quechuan languages, is the last of three song cycles for soprano and piano that Messiaen wrote.

They received their première on 27 June 1946 in Brussels with the composer himself at the piano and his preferred singer Marcelle Bunlet as vocalist.

A typical performance lasts about 50 minutes on average.

== Analysis ==
Messiaen, the son of two writers, had written two song-cycles beforehand (Poèmes pour Mi and Chants de Terre et de Ciel) but these were composed on personal levels. Several sources of inspiration had led to Messiaen conceptualising Harawi, then eventually the entire Tristan trilogy (succeeded by the Turangalîla-Symphonie and the Cinq rechants, both completed in 1948) such as folk music from the Andes and the opera Tristan und Isolde by Richard Wagner, where he was introduced to the myth.

A harawi or yaravi is a genre of Peruvian folk music and poetry, akin to a tragedy, often dealing with lost love and a contemplation on death, often played on the flute. The cycle concentrate on Messiaen's Peruvian reimagining of the myth of the two fated lovers, Tristan (unnamed) and Iseult (Piroutcha). However, it is very likely that the work has a subliminal context as an expression of love to Messiaen's mentally deteriorating wife Claire Delbos. Despite this, no mention at all is made of her in the work.

The texts of the cycle are written in a highly surrealist form, generally with comprisations of isolated symbols, raised to the ultimate symbolic ideal in that they are emancipated from grammatical on syntactical constructions. As is the case for almost all of his vocal works, Messiaen himself wrote the libretto; following Wagner's music dramas and Debussy who set his own symbolist poetry in his four Proses lyriques. The work borrows melodies from numerous traditional folksongs of the Andes as compiled in a book by Raoul d'Harcourt and his wife Marguerite Béclard. In addition to the French text, Harawi also uses Quechua words, some faux, some real, not for their semantic meaning, but for their sound, that is, their timbral and syllabic qualities. He would later reuse this practice in the Rechants and Saint François d'Assise. Despite these inspirations, his own musical style prevails.

== Songs ==
=== "La ville qui dormait, toi" ===
Translating to "You, the city that slept", this song opens the cycle on a slow and tender note; evoking past love. The lovers are sleeping in this episode.

It also borrows from the refrain of a French folk song.

=== "Bonjour toi, colombe verte" ===
The origins of this movement lie in a Peruvian folksong titled "Deliria", which was then harmonised as a 'love theme' by Messiaen for organ in 1945 as he improvised incidental music to a play by Lucien Fabre about Tristan and Iseult; this same theme, now more well known as Harawi's love theme or simply the Tristan theme (which appears in the succeeding movements, seven and twelve) is also alluded to in the Turangalîla-Symphonie and is one of the bases for the latter's famous love theme.

The female lover Piroutcha is alluded to as a "green dove", hence the title "Greetings, O Green Dove". Faux birdsong appears in the movement. Symbolism occurs in the lines: "Enchained Star, shared shadow, thou, of flower, fruit, sky, and water, [of] Bird song".

=== "Montagnes" ===
This strong work, with high force from the pianist, creates musical impressions of the peaks of the Andes mountains. The singer sings in a lower range than usual.

=== "Dondou tchil" ===
In what is perhaps the most famous song of the Harawi cycle, the male lover performs, with crotal bells attached to his ankles, a dance of courtship, which then turns into an ecstatic serenade. It climaxes with faux birdsong.

The song's title onomatopoeically represents the ringing of the miniature bells. Contrary to popular belief, the words are at variance with Quechua phonetics and are gibberish (similar to what Messiaen practised in his later Cinq Rechants).

=== "L'Amour de Piroutcha" ===
The music itself was composed in 1945, but not originally for this cycle: the Conservatoire de Paris, where Messiaen served as harmony professor shortly after his release from Stalag VIII-A in early 1941, commissioned him to write a short examination piece for oboe with piano accompaniment. The result was titled Pièce. Satisfied by the work, Messiaen placed the work verbatim in the Harawi cycle by simply replacing the oboe part with a soprano one.

Titled "Piroutcha's love", in it, a dialogue is held between the two lovers. She flirts with the unnamed man, but he tearfully responds by saying that they can only be united in death. The man then asks Piroutcha to behead him.

=== "Répétition planétaire" ===
The title translates to Planetary Repetition, with this song evoking a dark, vast, and chaotic vision of the universe. Eventually, the drama of the lovers begins to resonate with the grandeur of the cosmos with a planet of destruction and representations of a mental breakdown.

The Sanskrit word lîla, or 'divine play', takes a prominent part in this movement.

=== "Adieu" ===
A sombre equivalent to the second movement "Bonjour toi", transforming the joyous serenade into a dolorous lament of grief expressing worries of an eternal farewell. Evocations of bells and gongs are heard and Piroutcha reminisces about how they took a love potion.

=== "Syllabes" ===
As Piroutcha mourns and yearns for her lost beloved, awaiting her entry into Heaven, she dances out of grief. Notably, this uses repetitions of the word pia to simulate the cries of apes, descending from a Quechua legend in which these animals' cries rescued a prince from danger. The quasi-campanological "Dondou tchil" chant from the fourth movement also returns.

Here, Piroutcha is associated with the number five, alluding to the Hindu god Shiva. There are numerous references to mythology and the supernatural in this movement.

=== "L'escalier redit, gestes du soleil" ===
("The Stairs Echo the Gestures of the Sun").

=== "Amour oiseau d'étoile" ===
("The Lovebird of the Star").

One of the most famous parts of the cycle, it is explicitly referred to in one of Messiaen's own programme notes to the Turangalîla-Symphonie. An excerpt of the song also appears on the gravestone shared by Messiaen and his second wife Yvonne Loriod in Saint-Théoffrey.

=== "Katchikatchi les étoiles" ===
(Quechua for "Grasshopper" and French for "the Stars").

=== "Dans le noir" ===
("In the Dark").

== Discography ==
Marie Kobayashi, mezzo-soprano, and Fuminori Tanada, piano:

- Daphénéo, 3534610812038, distribution Codaex, record. Conservatoire de Montreuil, October 2008

Yvonne Loriod, piano, and Rachel Yakar, soprano:

- Erato, 2292-45505-2/IX ECD 75501, record. Studio 107 Radio-France, Paris, February 1988

Carl-Axel Dominique, piano, and Dorothy Dorow, soprano:

- BIS, 7318590000861, record. Nacka Aula, Sweden, 27–29 May 1977

== Sources ==
- Siglind Bruhn. Messiaen's Explorations of Love and Death: Musical Signification in the Tristan Trilogy and Three related song cycles, Pendragon, 2008. ISBN 978-1-57647-136-4 - Google
