= Réveil des oiseaux =

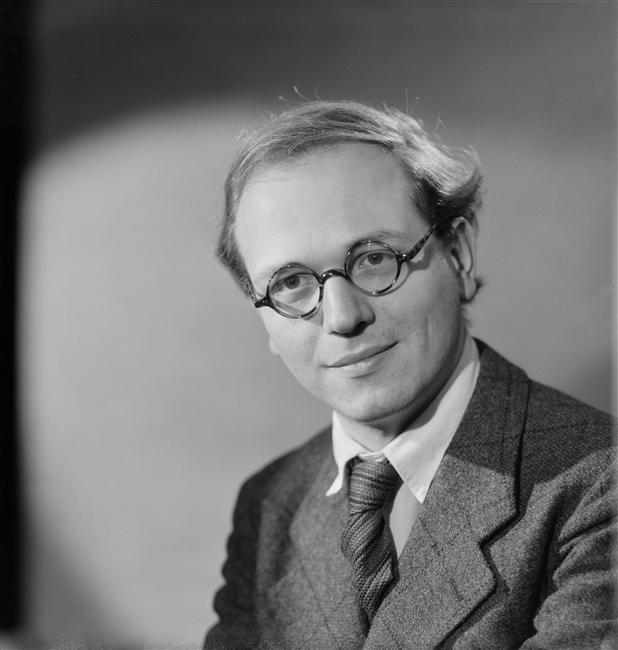
Olivier Messiaen in 1937

Réveil des oiseaux (Awakening of the birds) is a work by Olivier Messiaen for piano and orchestra written in 1953. Messiaen invoked birdsong in this composition, as he had in the earlier Quatuor pour la fin du temps (1941). In Réveil des oiseaux he used bird song motifs throughout.

== Origin and creation ==
Réveil des oiseaux was commissioned by the German critic and musicologist Heinrich Strobel (1898–1970). It is a 28-minute work dedicated to the memory of ornithologist Jacques Delamain and was premiered at the Donaueschingen Festival on October 11, 1953. Yvonne Loriod was the piano soloist while the Orchestra of the Südwestfunk Baden-Baden was conducted by Hans Rosbaud.

The orchestra ensemble included 3 flutes, 1 piccolo, 2 oboes, 1 English horn, 4 clarinets, 3 bassoons, 2 horns, 2 trumpets, 2 percussionists, 1 xylophone, 1 glockenspiel, 1 celesta, 8 violins I, 8 violins II, 8 violas, 8 cellos, 6 double basses, and a piano soloist.

== Discography ==
- Václav Neumann, Czech Philharmonic, Yvonne Loriod, piano; Supraphone, 1969.
- Kent Nagano, Orchestre national de France, Yvonne Loriod, piano; Erato Musifrance, 1996 (+ Trois petites liturgies de la présence divine).
- Pierre Boulez, Cleveland Orchestra, Pierre-Laurent Aimard, piano; Deutsche Grammophon, 1997 (+ Sept haïkaï; Poèmes pour Mi).
