= Marcelle Bunlet =

French soprano (1900–1991)

- Bunlet in 1937
- Born: 9 October 1900; Fontenay-le-Comte, Vendée, France
- Died: 13 December 1991 (aged 91); Paris, France
- Occupations: Operatic soprano, voice teacher
- Years active: 1926–1950 (performer)
- Employer: Conservatoire de Strasbourg (1945–1970)

Marcelle Bunlet (French pronunciation: [maʁsɛl bɛ̃lɛ]; 9 October 1900 – 13 December 1991) was a French dramatic soprano and voice teacher. She had a career in concerts and operas from 1926 until her retirement in 1950. While she sang a broad range of roles on the opera stage, she was particularly celebrated for her performances in the operas of Richard Wagner and Richard Strauss. According to Karl-Josef Kutsch and Leo Riemens, Bunlet, along with Germaine Lubin, was "the most prominent French high dramatic and Wagner singer of her era." She was a frequent collaborator with composer Olivier Messiaen, who wrote three song cycles for her voice. From 1945 to 1970 she was a professor of voice at the Conservatoire de Strasbourg.

== Life and career ==
Marcelle Bunlet was born on 9 October 1900 in Fontenay-le-Comte, Vendée, France. She made her professional debut in a concert in Paris conducted by Walther Straram in 1926, and nearly two years later made her opera debut with the Opéra-Comique in the title role of Paul Dukas's Ariane et Barbe-bleue in January 1928. One month later she gave her first performance at the Paris Opera as Brünnhilde in Wagner's Götterdämmerung. She returned to the Paris Opera soon after as Marguerite in Berlioz's La Damnation de Faust, Valentine in Meyerbeer's Les Huguenots, and in the title role of Strauss's Salome.

In June 1928 Bunlet was a soloist in César Franck's oratorio Les Béatitudes conducted by Bernardino Molinari at the Teatro Augusteo in Rome. In the 1928–1929 season she performed the role of Isolde in Wagner's Tristan und Isolde at La Monnaie in Brussels, returning there in 1930 to perform Brünnhilde in the complete Ring cycle. In 1931 she performed the role of Kundry in Wagner's Parsifal at the Bayreuth Festival under Arturo Toscanini. That same year she sang Brünnhilde in the Ring cycle at the Paris Opera. Despite being well reviewed in her initial Bayreuth appearance, she only returned there in 1933 to sing supporting roles, portraying a Rhine Maiden in Die Walküre and a Flower Maiden in Parsifal.

In 1934 Bunlet repeated the role of Dukas's Ariane for her debut at the Teatro Colón in Buenos Aires where she also performed the title role in Gluck's Alceste. In March 1934 she appeared at the Opéra de Monte-Carlo in the title role of Strauss's Arabella for that opera's first performance in a French-language translation. Other roles she performed in the ensuing years included Mozart's Countess Almaviva in The Marriage of Figaro and Donna Anna in Don Giovanni, Leonore in Beethoven's Fidelio, Wagner's Elisabeth in Tannhäuser, Elsa in Lohengrin, Eva in Die Meistersinger von Nürnberg, and Senta in Der fliegende Holländer, Mélisande in Debussy's Pelléas et Mélisande, and the title roles in Verdi's Aida, Louise, and Puccini's Madama Butterfly and Tosca.

From 1934 to 1938 Bunlet was a regular performer at the Paris Opera singing many of her signature roles, including Ariane, Brünnhilde, Isolde, Valentine, and Margherita in Boito's Mefistofele. In 1937-1938 she returned to La Monnaie to reprise Brünnhilde. Her intelligence as a singer coupled with a skilled dramatic soprano quality led to work as a guest singer, performing in major French opera houses like the Opéra National de Lyon, Opéra de Marseille, Opéra de Nice, Théâtre Graslin, and the Grand Théâtre de Bordeaux (first performance 1945). She also appeared in Swiss opera houses, and as a concert singer in South America, Greece, Italy, and Belgium.

By 1939 Bunlet had established herself as Olivier Messiaen's favorite soprano, and she often collaborated with the composer. Messiaen composed three song cycles with Bunlet's voice in mind, including his Poèmes pour Mi (composed in 1936–1937). On 23 January 1939 she sang the premiere of Messiaen's song cycle Chants de Terre et de Ciel at the École Normale de Musique de Paris. Another song cycle he wrote for her was his Harawi (1945).

Bunlet retired from performance in 1950. She ended her career as a professor of singing at the Conservatoire de Strasbourg. She taught there from 1945 until her retirement from teaching in 1970. She died in Paris on 13 December 1991.
