= Claire Delbos =

French musician (1906–1959)

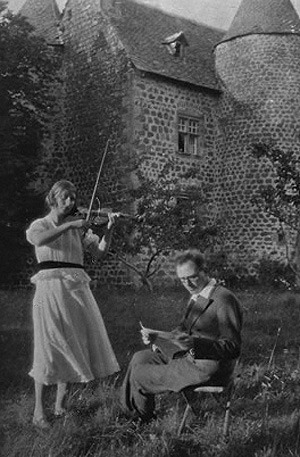
Delbos and her husband Olivier Messiaen in Neussargues-Moissac

Louise-Justine Messiaen (née Delbos; 2 November 1906 – 22 April 1959), more commonly known under her pseudonym Claire Delbos, was a French violinist and composer. She was the first wife of the composer Olivier Messiaen.

== Biography ==
=== Early life ===
Louise-Justine Delbos was born in the fourth arrondissement of Paris on 2 November 1906; she was the youngest child of Victor Delbos, a professor at the University of Sorbonne University, and Lucie Devillez, daughter of a doctor from Lorraine. Her elder siblings were Gérard (1899-1903) and Marie-Rose (born 1901).

Although she was usually known after her marriage as Claire or as Claire-Louise, she was baptized Louise Justine Delbos. She was a pupil at the Schola Cantorum, a private music school in Paris, and later studied violin and composition at the Paris Conservatoire.

=== Marriage and career ===
Her skill on the violin brought her to the attention of the young Messiaen. They gave recitals together in Paris in the early 1930s, and were married on 22 June 1932. The composer Claude Arrieu was Delbos's bridesmaid. Messiaen wrote the Thème et variations for violin and piano as a wedding gift for his wife; they performed it together on 22 November 1932.

During that summer, the Messiaens moved into an apartment at 77 rue des Plantes, on the Left Bank in the fourteenth arrondissement of Paris. This was to be their home for the next six years, and was the venue of occasional musical gatherings of select friends; it was where they first met the Jolivets. Some of Messiaen's works were written to celebrate the happiness of the young couple, an example being the song cycle Poèmes pour Mi for soprano and piano in 1936, which he arranged for soprano and orchestra in 1937, and which was based on his own poems about the joy of marriage. Mi was Messiaen's affectionate nickname for Delbos. Delbos also composed several organ works, including Paraphrase sur le jugement dernier and L'offrande à Marie, for Messiaen.

In the early years of their marriage, several of their holidays were spent at the Château Saintt Benoît in Neussargues-Moissac – a château, owned by the Delbos family, which Messiaen found conducive to composing, and where much of L'Ascension was written. The successful Thème et variations was followed by another violin work written by Messiaen for his wife – Fantaisie, though this was not published until 2007 or 2008. It is not clear whether it was performed in public during their lifetimes.

=== Personal life and death ===
Delbos suffered a series of miscarriages in the early years of her marriage; but in 1937 their son Pascal was born. As a result, the following year, her husband produced another song cycle, Chants de terre et de ciel, in which all three members of the family were portrayed. The Messiaens moved into 13 villa du Danube in the 19th arrondissement.

In 1949, Delbos underwent a disastrous hysterectomy that resulted in a cerebral infection and, eventually, total amnesia. She entered a sanatorium, and remained institutionalized, with steadily declining health, for the rest of her life.

Delbos died on 22 April 1959 in Bourg-la-Reine, survived by Olivier and Pascal Messiaen.

== Compositions ==
Songs (for voice and piano):

- Primevère (1935) (five songs on poems by Cécile Sauvage, Messiaen's mother):
  - Le long de mes genoux
  - J'ai peur d'être laide
  - Mais je suis belle d'être aimée
  - Je suis née à l'amour
  - Dans ma robe à bouquets bleus
- L'âme en bourgeon (1937) (eight songs on poems written by Cécile Sauvage on the birth of her son Olivier):
  - Dors
  - Mon coeur revient à son printemps
  - Je suis là
  - Te voilà hors de l'alvéole
  - Je savais que ce serait toi
  - Maintenant il est né
  - Te voilà mon petit amant
  - Ai-je pu t'appeler de l'ombre
- Trois aspects de la mort (first performed in 1947):
  - Sans espérance (Cécile Sauvage)
  - Lamentation et terreur (Book of Job)
- Vers elle, avec confiance (R. de Obaldia)

Other vocal

- Psalm 141, for soprano, female chorus, four ondes Martenots, and piano. Unpublished.

Organ

- Deux pièces (1935)
  - L'homme né de la femme vit peu de jours
  - La Vierge berce l'enfant
- Paraphrase sur le jugement dernier (1939)
- L'offrande à Marie (1943)
  - Voici la servante du Seigneur
  - Vierge digne de louanges
  - Mère des pauvres
  - Mère toute-joyeuse
  - Debout, la Mère des douleurs
  - Secours des Chrétiens, reine de la paix
- Parce, Domine 'Pardonnez, Seigneur, à votre peuple', pour le temps de Carême (1952)

== See also ==
- Yvonne Loriod, second wife of Messiaen
