= Qin Chuan =

Qin Chuan (Chinese: 秦川), also known as Chuan Qin, is a Chinese pianist and a professor at School of Arts, Shandong University.

== Biography ==
Born in Nanjing, Qin started learning the piano at the age of five, and attended the Shanghai Conservatory of Music from 1988 to 1994. He subsequently went to the United States to pursue his music studies at the Juilliard School of Music where he obtained his Bachelor and Master's degrees, as well as a Doctorate of Music Arts.

Qin Chuan is known for his performance of Olivier Messiaen's music. Having heard Qin perform Réveil des oiseaux with Myung-Whun Chung from memory, Messiaen's widow, Yvonne Loriod, selected him as the winner of the Messiaen Prize in Paris. Qin's repertoire ranges from the early Baroque to the avant-garde.

== Awards ==
Qin Chuan has won several international piano competitions, including:

- Maria Canals International Music Competition, juniors, Barcelona, Spain (1991) - first prize
- 2nd China International Piano Competition, Beijing, China (1999) - first prize
- Grand Prix of the Olivier Messiaen International Piano Competition in Paris, France, where he was also awarded the Special Prize for the best performance of Catalogue d'oiseaux (2003)
