= Trois Petites Liturgies de la présence divine =

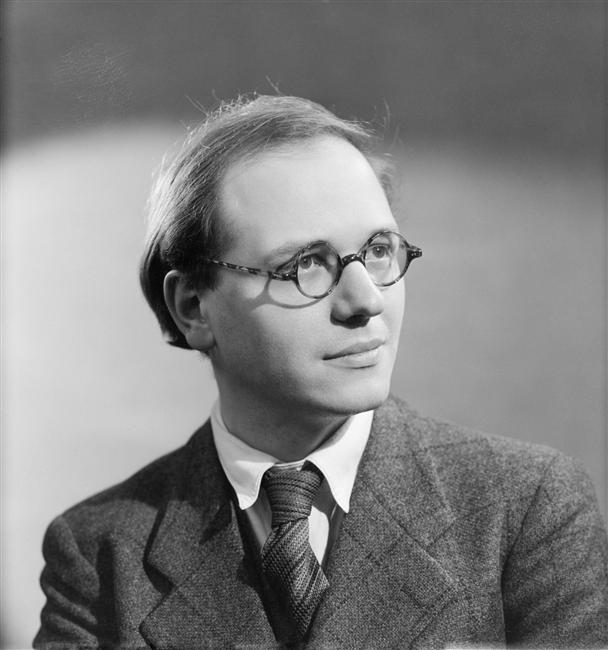
Messiaen by Studio Harcourt (1937)

The Trois Petites Liturgies de la présence divine (English: Three Small Liturgies of the Divine Presence) form a tripartite cantata by Olivier Messiaen. One of his most pivotal and controversial works, it was written from 1943 through 1944, for women's voices, piano solo, onde Martenot, percussion battery, and small string orchestra. Its libretto was written by Messiaen himself.

In spite of its sacred texts, it is not a liturgical work and is primarily designed for concert purposes; the composer nevertheless stated that at least individual movements of it could be played during a Catholic service.

The work was revised twice; in 1952 and 1990. Its score was published by Éditions Durand.

== Composition and premiere ==
The Trois Petites Liturgies were commissioned by Denise Tual, daughter of Henri Piazza, for the Concerts de la Pléiade in Paris and composed during World War II, between 15 November 1943, and 15 March 1944. Messiaen originally conceived the piece as a work for two pianos, as he had achieved success in that format previously with Visions de l'Amen. The sung words evoke the presence of God in himself and in all things, as indicated by the title. According to Messiaen, each movement describes a different facet of God's presence:

The principal idea is that of the divine presence, with each section dedicated to a different kind of presence. The first section, 'Antienne de la conversation intérieure' ('Antiphon of the Interior Conversation') is dedicated to the God who is present within us; the second section, 'Sequence du verbe, cantique divin' ('Sequence of the Word, Divine Song') is dedicated to the God who is present in Himself; and the third section, 'Psalmodie de l’ubiquité par amour' (Psalmody of the Ubiquity of Love) is inscribed to the God who is present in all things. These inexpressible ideas are not expressed but remain of the order of a dazzling display of color.

The work was premiered during the Concerts de la Pléiade at the Ancien Conservatoire on April 21, 1945, by Ginette Martenot (onde Martenot, sister of its inventor Maurice), Yvonne Loriod (piano), the Yvonne Gouverné Chorale, and the Orchestra of the Société des Concerts du Conservatoire, under the direction of Roger Désormière.

Present at the premiere included such respected persons as Arthur Honegger, Georges Auric, Francis Poulenc, Henri Sauguet, Roland-Manuel, André Jolivet, Claude Delvincourt, Lazare Lévy, Daniel-Lesur, Irène Joachim, Maurice Gendron, Jean Wiener, Georges Braque, Paul Eluard, Pierre Reverdy, Pierre Boulez, Serge Nigg, and Pierre Henry. Although the piece was well-received by the public, the critics reacted more harshly. The work sparked a controversy which came to be known as "bataille des liturgies". The two primary points of contention were "the quality and relevance of Messiaen's commentaries" and the use of "unusual sounds" for expressing religious themes. Claude Rostand responded particularly vehemently at the premiere, describing the work as a "work of tinsel, false magnificence and pseudo-mysticism, this work with dirty nails and clammy hands, with bloated complexion and unhealthy flab, replete with noxious matter, looking about anxiously like an angel wearing lipstick." Years later, Rostand would write that the premiere agitated musical Paris in a frenzy, partly caused by the end of German occupation, and never seen since the heyday of Stravinsky, with Messiaen "acclaimed and crucified at the same time".

In spite of this, critical opinion now judges the work to be one of Messiaen's most accomplished yet undemanding, still rooted in tonality but foreshadowing his later experiments with birdsong, Hindu rhythms and plainchant. It remains a major work of the composer.

== Movements ==
The work is composed of three movements:

1. Antienne de la conversation intérieure (Antiphon of the Interior Conversation)

A-B-A (ternary form). Approximately 10 minutes long.

2. Séquence du verbe, cantique divin (Sequence of the Word, Divine Song)

Strophic form with variations, refrains, and couplets alternating continuously. Approximately 6 minutes long.

3. Psalmodie de l'ubiquité par amour (Psalmody of the Ubiquity of Love)

A-B-A-B (binary form). Approximately 20 minutes long.

The piece lasts approximately 36 minutes.

== Instrumentation ==
=== Soloists ===
- piano
- onde Martenot

=== Keyboard ===
The celesta sounds one octave above what is notated in the score.

- celesta

=== Choir ===
During both subsequent revisions of the work, the composer doubled the required vocal forces to strengthen the sound.

- 36 female voices in unison (1952 version: 18 female voices; 1944 version: 9 female voices)

Of sopranos, and some mezzo-sopranos and contraltos.

=== Percussion battery ===
The vibraphone is notated in its natural pitch in the score. The cantata requires four percussionists, playing:

- vibraphone
- pair of maracas
- suspended Chinese cymbal, medium register
- tam-tam, deep register

=== Strings ===
To support the newly-doubled size of the choir, Messiaen doubled the string section during his 1990 revision. Originally, every string instrument (for a total of sixteen) had the potential to play alone as a single part, and does so on multiple occasions in the two earlier versions. The doubling therefore changed the former individuations to duetting single parts between two players.

- 8 first violins (1944 and 1952 version: 4 first violins)
- 8 second violins (1944 and 1952 version: 4 second violins)
- 6 violas (1944 and 1952 version: 3 violas)
- 6 cellos (1944 and 1952 version: 3 cellos)
- 4 contrabasses (1944 and 1952 version: 2 contrabasses)

A total of thirty-two musicians (and a conductor) are called for in the original version. In 1950, fifty musicians are called for. The final 1990 version calls for a grand total of seventy-five musicians, who may be led by a conductor and choirmaster.
