= Qinchuan =

Qinchuan may refer to:

- Qinchuan cattle, a breed of Turano-Mongolian cattle
- Qinchuan, a regional Qin school associated with Changshu
- Qinchuan, Lanzhou, a town of Lanzhou New Area
- BYD Auto, previously known as Qinchuan Automobile before BYD Company's acquisition

== See also ==
- Qin Chuan (born 1975), Chinese pianist and professor
