= Triton (chamber music society) =

French music society

Triton was a Paris-based chamber music society founded by Pierre-Octave Ferroud to promote new music. Its executive committee consisted of composers, including Francis Poulenc, Darius Milhaud, Arthur Honegger, Bohuslav Martinů and Sergei Prokofiev. On its honorary committee were Maurice Ravel, Albert Roussel, Arnold Schoenberg, Richard Strauss, Igor Stravinsky, Béla Bartók and Karol Szymanowski. Concerts were held at the École normale de musique, the first being held on 16 December 1932. The inaugural concert included the premiere of Honegger's Sonatine for Violin and Cello, and the European premiere of Prokofiev's Sonata for Two Violins.

Another notable premiere by the society was Olivier Messiaen's Chants de Terre et de Ciel, under the title Prisms, on 23 January 1939. Other composers who had their works premiered by the society were Bartók and Paul Hindemith.
