= Thème et variations (Messiaen) =

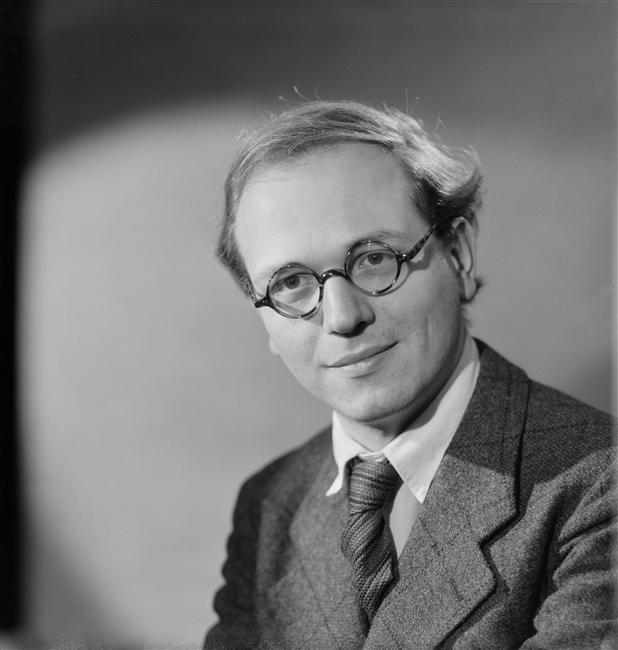
Olivier Messiaen in 1937

Thème et variations (Theme and Variations) is a 1932 composition by Olivier Messiaen for violin and piano. It is considered as equally characteristic and immediately accessible as his Quatuor pour la fin du temps. The work was originally written as a wedding present for the composer's first wife, the violinist Claire Delbos, whom he married on 22 June 1932. The young couple gave the first performance on 22 November the same year.

The work is divided into six brief sections:

- Thème – Modéré
- Variation Number 1 – Modéré
- Variation Number 2 – Un peu moins Modére
- Variation Number 3 – Modéré, avec éclat
- Variation Number 4 – Vif et passionné
- Variation Number 5 – Tres modéré

A typical performance lasts around ten minutes.

== Sources ==
- Dingle, Christopher. The Life of Messiaen.
