= Olivier Messiaen Competition =

International piano competition

The Olivier Messiaen Competition is an international contemporary piano competition organized by the City of Paris in homage to the French composer Olivier Messiaen. The first edition took place in 2000.

== Laureates of the competition ==
Year	President	Jury	Prize
2000	Yvonne Loriod	Håkon Austbø (Netherland); Maria-Elena Barrientos (Spain); George Benjamin (United-Kingdom); Michel Béroff (France); Alain Louvier (France); Roger Muraro (France); Marcello Panni (Monaco); Pierre Réach (France); Thomas Daniel Schlee (Germany); Takahiro Sonoda (Japan); Takahashi Yamamoto (Japan)	1st Grand Prix: Markus Bellheim (Germany) 2nd Prix: Jean Dubé (France); 3rd Prix: Hiroaki Ooï (Japan); Prix Yvonne Loriod: Jean Dubé
2003	Michel Béroff	İdil Biret (Turkey); Suzanne Cheetham-Pillinger (Great-Britain); Ivan Fedele (Italy); Peter Hill (Great-Britain); Jun Kanno (Japan); Noël Lee (U.S); Yvonne Loriod-Messiaen (France); Roger Muraro (France).	1st Grand Prix: Qin Chuan (China) 2nd Grand Prix: Prodromos Symeonidis (Greece); 3rd Prix: Hue-Am Park (Korea); 4th Prix: Feodor Amirov (Russia); Prix Yvonne Loriod: Prodromos Symeonidis
2007	Gilbert Amy	Louise Bessette (Canada); Marie-Françoise Bucquet (France); Nguyen-Thien Dao (France); Jean-François Heisser (France); Momo Kodama (Japan); Klára Körmendi (Hungary); Roger Muraro, (France); Mikhail Rudy (France)	Grand Prix of the City of Paris: Le Liu (China) 2nd Grand Prix: Marie Vermeulin (France); 3rd Prix: Mako Okamoto (Japan); 4th Prix: Yury Favorin (Russia)

== See also ==
- List of classical music competitions
