= Victor Delbos =

French historian and philosopher (1862–1916)

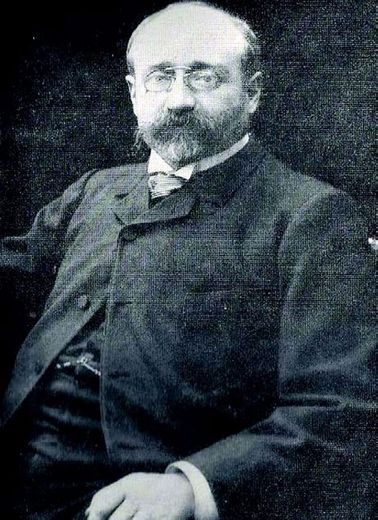
- Born: Étienne Marie Justin Victor Delbos; 26 September 1862; Figeac, France
- Died: 16 June 1916 (aged 53); Paris, France
- Relatives: Claire Delbos (daughter)

Education
- Education: École Normale Supérieure; University of Paris
- Doctoral advisor: Émile Boutroux
- Other advisor: Léon Ollé-Laprune

Philosophical work
- Era: 20th-century philosophy
- Region: Western philosophy
- School: Continental philosophy
- Institutions: University of Paris
- Doctoral students: Étienne Gilson
- Notable students: Émile Bréhier
- Main interests: History of philosophy

Étienne Marie Justin Victor Delbos (French: [dɛlbo]; 26 September 1862 – 16 June 1916) was a French philosopher and historian of philosophy.

== Biography ==
Delbos was born on 26 September 1862 in Figeac. He was appointed a lecturer at the Sorbonne in 1902. In 1911, he became a member of the Académie des Sciences Morales et Politiques. He died on 16 June 1916, aged 53, in Paris, as a result of an infectious myocarditis brought on by pleurisy. Maurice Blondel, a close friend, wrote an obituary account of Delbos and saw various posthumous publications through the press.

Delbos was the father of the violinist and composer Claire Delbos. In turn, he was the father-in-law of Olivier Messiaen.

== Work ==
He wrote on Spinoza, Nicolas Malebranche and Kant. A series of lectures on post-Kantian philosophy, which Delbos viewed as shaped by contingent psychological and social factors rather than through the unfolding of some internal logic, were published posthumously and later (1942) collected in a single volume.

== Works ==
- Le problème moral dans la philosophie de Spinoza et dans l'histoire du spinozisme, Paris: Alcan, 1893
- La Philosophie pratique de Kant, 1905
- Le spinozisme : cours professé à la Sorbonne en 1912-1913, 1916
- La philosophie française, 1919
- Étude de la philosophie de Malebranche, 1924
- De Kant aux postkantiens, 1942
