= Concert à quatre =

Quadruple concerto by Olivier Messaien

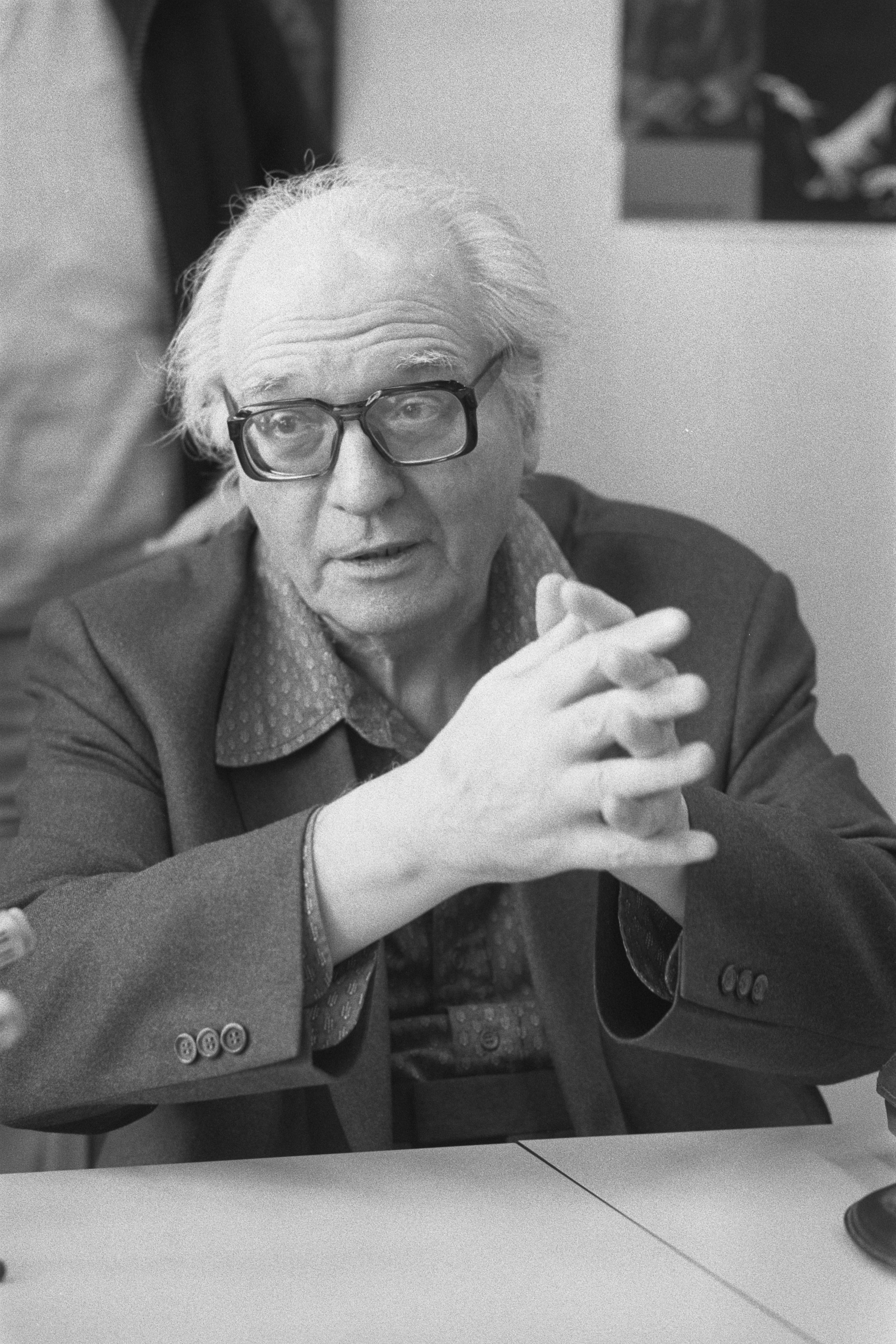
Olivier Messiaen in 1986

Concert à quatre (Concerto for four) is the final work of the French composer Olivier Messiaen. It is a concerto written for four solo instruments (piano, cello, flute, oboe) and orchestra.

== Composition ==
Messiaen first considered writing an oboe concerto for Heinz Holliger, then a piece for oboe, cello, piano, harp and orchestra on the subject of Grace. He had previously only involved the harp in his Prix de Rome cantatas.

In its final form (oboe, cello, piano, flute and orchestra), Concert à quatre was conceived in 1990 and begun in the summer of 1991. Messiaen worked on it steadily until December of that year. He originally intended the piece to have five movements, but at the beginning of 1992 his decline in health slowed the piece's progress and ultimately prevented him from completing it before his death.

As it stands, the work is in four movements, in which Messiaen draws inspiration from Mozart, Scarlatti and Rameau as well as from his usual birdsong transcriptions. His notes also mention Henri Dutilleux and the orchestration of Ravel's Gaspard de la nuit by Marius Constant.

Of the completed movements, Messiaen's widow, Yvonne Loriod, in conjunction with the composers George Benjamin and Heinz Holliger, orchestrated the second half of the first movement and the whole of the fourth. Messiaen described the latter in the draft score as "completely reviewed - good in terms of sonority, length and dynamics". Furthermore, Messiaen had intended to include a free meter sequence based on various birdsongs. To write it, Loriod used similar sketches discarded from his opera Saint François d'Assise and included them in that last movement. She also added a chorus of bells from the same source.

Messiaen had intended the fifth movement to be a fugue, but as he had not even sketched it, it could not be completed and was thus left out of the final version.

It was written for five musicians he felt particularly grateful to: the pianist Yvonne Loriod (his wife), the cellist Mstislav Rostropovich, the oboist Heinz Holliger, the flautist Catherine Cantin, and the conductor Myung-Whun Chung.

The score was published by Éditions Alphonse Leduc in 2003.

== Music ==
The first movement (Entrée) is bipartite and juxtaposes several musical ideas: a theme inspired by Susanna's aria Venite inginocchiatevi in Act 2 of Mozart's Le nozze di Figaro, birdsong transcriptions (garden warbler as well as birds of New Zealand like the blue-wattled crow, the bush canary and the kākāpō), a call and response of short melodic cells, a section for wind machine, strings and cymbal and two conclusive chords. That sequence is then repeated and amplified in the second part.

The second movement is an orchestral transcription of Messiaen's own Vocalise of 1935. This transcription was written first and was the impetus for the whole work.

The third movement (Cadenza), as its title suggests, focuses almost exclusively on the four soloists. It features the lyrebird (cello), the musician wren (flute) and the garden warbler in dialogue with the Natal robin on pitched percussion.

The final completed movement, titled Rondeau, is the longest and most complex. An energetic refrain is followed by a verse which features a wide range of birds including the bellbird, the golden oriole, the capercaillie and the black-throated diver amongst many others. That refrain-verse sequence is presented twice. After that comes a free meter section, then a chorus of bells before the refrain is stated one last time. The piece ends on an A Major chord, a key that Messiaen associated with joy.

== Premiere ==
Concert à Quatre was premiered by the dedicatees with the orchestra of the Opéra Bastille in Paris on 26 September 1994. The same forces recorded the work for CD the following day.
