= Vingt Regards sur l'Enfant-Jésus =

Suite for piano by Olivier Messiaen

- Piano suite by Olivier Messiaen
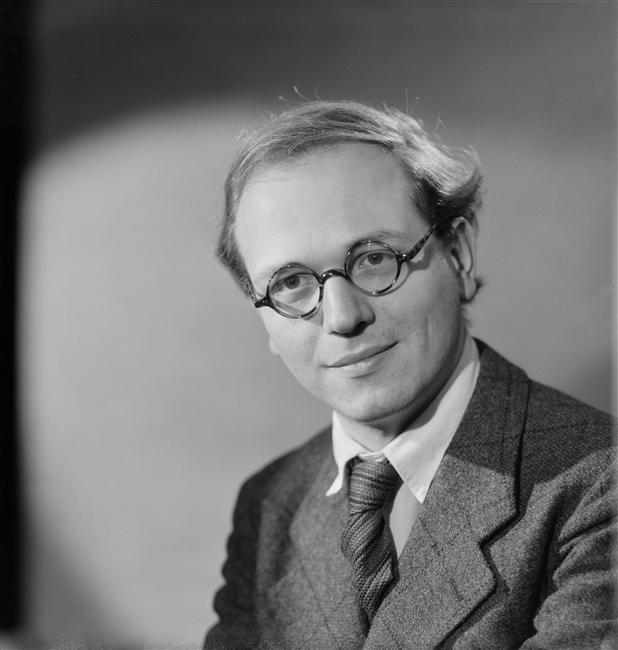
- Olivier Messiaen in 1937
- English: Twenty contemplations on the infant Jesus
- Period: Modern
- Composed: 1944
- Duration: About two hours

The Vingt Regards sur l'Enfant-Jésus ("Twenty Contemplations on the Infant Jesus") is a suite of 20 pieces for solo piano by the French composer Olivier Messiaen (1908–1992).

The suite is a meditation on the infancy of Jesus. It was composed from March to September of 1944 following a January commission by Maurice Toesca, wishing for a reading of his twelve poems on the nativity. The abandoned plan was later reworked with a dedication to his protégée Yvonne Loriod. A typical performance lasts about two hours. These '12 regards' appear to be incorporated into the plan of the final work, which may be described as a rondo in which the movements based on the "Theme of God", no.'s 1, 5, 6, 10, 11, 15, 19 and 20, frame four three-movement episodes. Although the work was finished shortly after the liberation of Paris in August and excerpts played in public by Messiaen and Loriod, the complete premiere took place 26 March 1945 at the Salle Gaveau with the composer reading aloud his own commentaries.

== Structure ==
There are 20 movements:

1. Regard du Père ("Contemplation of the Father")
2. Regard de l'étoile ("Contemplation of the star")
3. L'échange ("The exchange")
4. Regard de la Vierge ("Contemplation of the Virgin")
5. Regard du Fils sur le Fils ("Contemplation of the Son upon the Son")
6. Par Lui tout a été fait ("Through Him everything was made")
7. Regard de la Croix ("Contemplation of the Cross")
8. Regard des hauteurs ("Contemplation of the heights")
9. Regard du temps ("Contemplation of time")
10. Regard de l'Esprit de joie ("Contemplation of the joyful Spirit")
11. Première communion de la Vierge ("The Virgin's first communion")
12. La parole toute-puissante ("The all-powerful word")
13. Noël ("Christmas")
14. Regard des Anges ("Contemplation of the Angels")
15. Le baiser de l'Enfant-Jésus ("The kiss of the Infant Jesus")
16. Regard des prophètes, des bergers et des Mages ("Contemplation of the prophets, the shepherds and the Magi")
17. Regard du silence ("Contemplation of silence")
18. Regard de l'Onction terrible ("Contemplation of the awesome Anointing")
19. Je dors, mais mon cœur veille ("I sleep, but my heart keeps watch")
20. Regard de l'Eglise d'amour ("Contemplation of the Church of love")

== Thèmes ==
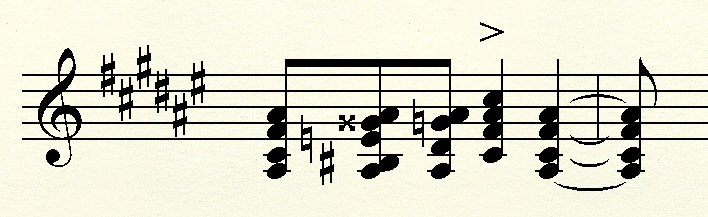
Thème de Dieu

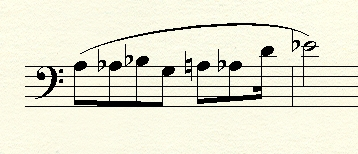
Thème de l'étoile et de la croix

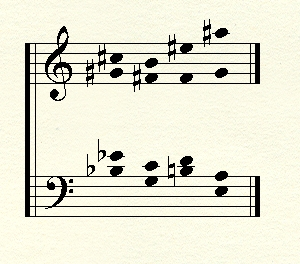
Thème d'accords

Messiaen uses Thèmes or leitmotifs, recurring elements that represent certain ideas. They include:

- Thème de Dieu ("Theme of God")
- Thème de l'amour mystique ("Theme of Mystical Love")
- Thème de l'étoile et de la croix ("Theme of the Star and of the Cross")
- Thème d'accords ("Theme of Chords")

For example, Messiaen has written that "The 'Theme of Chords' is heard throughout, fragmented, concentrated, surrounded with resonances, combined with itself, modified in both rhythm and register, transformed, transmuted in all sorts of ways: it is a complex of sounds intended for perpetual variation, pre-existing in the abstract like a series, but quite concrete and quite easily recognizable through its colours: a steely grey-blue shot through with red and bright orange, a mauve violet spotted with leather-brown and encircled by bluish-purple."
