= Émile Bréhier =

French historian of philosophy

- Born: 12 April 1876; Bar-le-Duc, France
- Died: 3 February 1952 (aged 75); Paris, France
- Relatives: Louis Bréhier (brother)

Academic background
- Education: University of Paris
- Thesis: Les idées philosophiques et religieuses de Philon d'Alexandrie (1907)
- Academic advisors: Henri Bergson; Victor Brochard; Victor Delbos

Academic work
- Era: 20th-century philosophy
- Region: Western philosophy
- School or tradition: Continental philosophy
- Institutions: University of Rennes; University of Bordeaux; University of Paris
- Doctoral students: Jean Hyppolite; Maurice Merleau-Ponty
- Notable students: Ferdinand Alquié; Paul Dibon; Martial Gueroult; Vladimir Jankélévitch
- Main interests: History of philosophy

Émile Bréhier (French: [bʁeje]; 12 April 1876 – 3 February 1952) was a French philosopher and historian of philosophy. He wrote a Histoire de la Philosophie, translated into English in seven volumes. This work inspired Frederick Copleston's own History of Philosophy (1946–1975), initially comprising nine volumes.

== Life ==
In 1908, Bréhier received his doctorate from the Sorbonne with a dissertation on thoughts of Philo of Alexandria. From 1910 to 1912, he was Master of Philosophical Conferences at the University of Rennes, and professor of philosophy at the University of Bordeaux from 1912 to 1914. He was Henri Bergson's successor at the University of Paris in 1945.

In 1914, Bréhier became a sub-lieutenant in the 344th Infantry Regiment; later, he was made a knight of the Légion d'honneur. In 1914, he lost his left arm in combat.

The art historian Louis Bréhier was his brother.

== Philosophical work ==
He was an early follower of Bergson; in the 1930s there was an influential view that Bergsonism and Neoplatonism were linked.

He has been called "the sole figure in the French history who adopts an Hegelian interpretation of Neoplatonism", but also a neo-Kantian opponent of Hegel.

== Works ==
- Les idées philosophiques et religieuses de Philon d'Alexandrie, (1908)
- La Théorie des incorporels dans l'ancien stoïcisme, Paris, Librairie Alphonse Picard & fils (1907).
- Schelling (1912)
- Histoire de la philosophie allemande (1921)
- La Philosophie de Plotin
- Plotin: Ennéades (with French translation), Collection Budé (1924–1938)
- Histoire de la philosophie – I: Antiquité et moyen âge (three volumes), II: La philosophie moderne (four volumes)
- La philosophie du moyen âge (1949)
- Le monde byzantin – la civilisation byzantine (1950)
- Chrysippe et l'ancien stoïcisme (Paris, 1951)
- Histoire de la philosophie allemande, 3rd edition updated by Paul Ricœur (1954).
- Études de philosophie antique (1955)

He contributed the articles "Philo Judaeus", and "Stoics and Stoic Philosophy" to the Catholic Encyclopedia.
