= Léon Ollé-Laprune =

French Catholic philosopher

Léon Ollé-Laprune (25 June 1839, Paris – 19 February 1898, Paris) was a French Catholic philosopher. He was a proponent of French spiritualism.

== Life ==
Under the influence of the philosopher Elme Marie Caro and of Auguste Joseph Alphonse Gratry's book Les Sources, Ollé-Laprune, after exceptionally brilliant studies at the École Normale Supérieure (1858 to 1861), devoted himself to philosophy. His life was spent in teaching, first in the lycées and then in the Ecole Normale Supérieure from 1875.

As Frédéric Ozanam had been a Catholic professor of history and foreign literature in the university, Ollé-Laprune's aim was to be a Catholic professor of philosophy there. Théodore de Regnon, the Jesuit theologian, wrote to him:

"I am glad to think that God wills in our time to revive the lay apostolate, as in the times of Justin and Athenagoras; it is you especially who give me these thoughts."

The Government of the Third Republic was now and then urged by a certain section of the press to punish the "clericalism" of Ollé-Laprune, but the repute of his philosophical teaching protected him. For one year only (1881–82), after organizing a manifestation in favour of the expelled congregations, he was suspended from his chair by Jules Ferry, and the first to sign the protest addressed by his students to the minister on behalf of their professor was the future socialist deputy Jean Jaurès, then a student at the Ecole Normale Supérieure.

The Academy of Moral and Political Sciences elected him a member of the philosophical section in 1897, to succeed Vacherot. Some months after his death William P. Coyne called him "the greatest Catholic layman who has appeared in France since Ozanam" ("New Ireland Review", June, 1899, p. 195).

== Work ==
Ollé-Laprune's first important work was La Philosophie de Malebranche (1870). Ten years later to obtain the doctorate he defended before the Sorbonne a thesis on moral certitude. As against Cartesian rationalism and positivistic determinism, he investigated the part of the will and the heart in the phenomenon of belief. This work resembles in many respects John Henry Newman's Grammar of Assent.

In his "Essai sur la morale d'Aristote" (1881) Ollé-Laprune defended the "eudaemonism" of the Greek philosopher against the Kantian theories; and in "La philosophie et le temps présent" (1890) he vindicated, against deistic spiritualism, the right of the Christian thinker to go beyond the data of "natural religion" and illuminate philosophy by the data of revealed religion.

One of his most influential works was the "Prix de la vie" (1894), wherein he shows why life is worth living. The advice given by Pope Leo XIII to the Catholics of France found in Ollé-Laprune an active champion. His brochure "Ce qu'on va chercher à Rome" (1895) was one of the best commentaries on the papal policy.

His articles and conferences attest his growing influence in Catholic circles. He became a leader of Christian activity, consulted and heard by all until his premature death when he was about to finish a book on Théodore Jouffroy (Paris, 1899). Many of his articles have been collected by Goyau under the title "La Vitalité chrétienne" (1901). Here will also be found a series of his unedited meditations, "Omnia instaurare in Christo". Victor Delbos of the University of Paris published in 1907 the course which Ollé-Laprune had given on reason and rationalism (La raison et le rationalisme).
