= Visions de l'Amen =

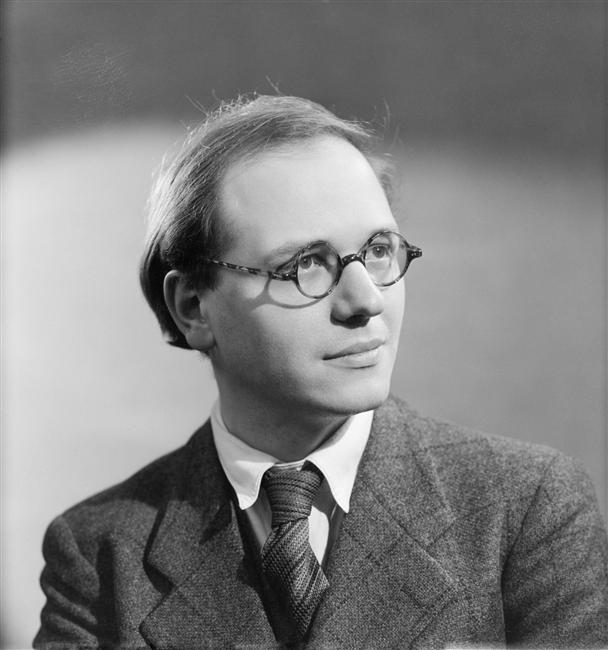
Olivier Messiaen in 1937

Visions de l'Amen ("Visions of the Amen") is a suite of seven pieces for two pianos by the French composer Olivier Messiaen (1908–1992), commissioned for the Concerts de la Pléiade that were held during the German occupation of Paris. It was composed in 1943 for the composer and Yvonne Loriod, and its performance requires about 40–45 minutes.

Contemporaneous to the composition of this work is the publication of Messiaen's theoretical treatise, Technique de mon langage musical (1944), which is a summation of the musical materials and compositional methods he had developed up to the midpoint of his career. Visions de l’Amen includes abundant examples of Messiaen's rhythmic organization (including rhythmic pedals and non-retrogradable rhythms), chords of resonance, stylized birdsong, and his unique modes of limited transpositions.

== Overview ==
According to Messiaen's "author's note" attached to the original score, the work takes its inspiration from a quote of Ernest Hello: "Amen, word of Genesis, which leads to Revelation; Amen, word of Revelation, which is the consummation of Genesis". Messiaen gives four basic interpretations of Amen: "It is done", "So be it, according to thy will", "In the hope, the desire, that I may freely give and freely receive", "It is so, world without end". He describes the music as seven musical visions which reflect the living beings who say "Amen" in gratitude for their existence.

Messiaen explains the different roles of the two piano parts: he assigned the primo part (played by Yvonne Loriod) "rhythmic difficulties, chord clusters, all that has speed, charm, and quality of sound". The secondo part (played by himself) he assigned "the principal melody, thematic elements, all that demands emotion and strength".

One of the principal themes of the work is the Creation theme, appearing in the first movement in the bass in long notes, in the fifth movement in three variations (altered), and finally in the seventh movement, over ten times.

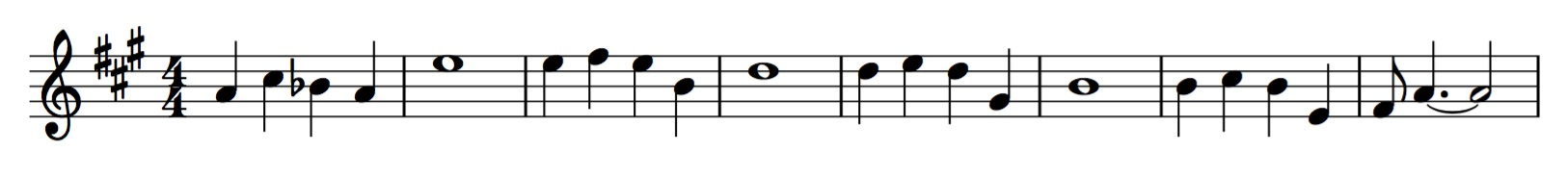
Creation theme

== Movements ==
There are seven movements:

1. Amen de la Création ("Amen of creation")
2. Amen des étoiles, de la planète à l'anneau ("Amen of stars, of the ringed planet")
3. Amen de l'agonie de Jésus ("Amen of Jesus' agony")
4. Amen du Désir ("Amen of desire")
5. Amen des Anges, des Saints, du chant des oiseaux ("Amen of angels, of saints, and of bird chant")
6. Amen du Jugement ("Amen of judgement")
7. Amen de la Consommation ("Amen of consummation")
