= Poèmes pour Mi =

- Song cycle by Olivier Messiaen
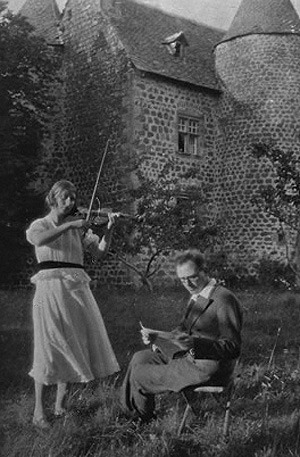
- Claire Delbos and Olivier Messiaen in 1933
- Text: Poems by the composer
- Language: French
- Composed: 1936–1937
- Dedication: Claire Delbos
- Duration: 32 min
- Movements: 9
- Scoring: soprano; piano or orchestra

Poèmes pour Mi (Poems for Mi) is a song cycle for dramatic soprano and piano or orchestra by Olivier Messiaen, composed in 1936 and 1937 and dedicated to his first wife, Claire Delbos. The texts are poems by the composer based on the New Testament.

== History ==
Messiaen composed the work at the Lac de Pétichet in the summer of 1936, setting his own poems. He specifically called for a grand soprano dramatique (great dramatic soprano), probably with the voice of Marcelle Bunlet in mind, who was a notable singer of Brünnhilde at the time. Messiaen dedicated the cycle to his first wife, Claire Delbos, a violinist and composer. It is one of three major song cycles, with Harawi and Chants de Terre et de Ciel, and the only one which he also orchestrated, the following year in Paris.

The piano version was premiered on 28 April 1937 as a concert of La Spirale, by Marcelle Bunlet and the composer at the piano. It was published by Éditions Durand. The first performance of the orchestral version took place at the salle Gaveau in Paris on 4 June 1937. The soprano Marcelle Bunlet was accompanied by the orchestra of the Société des Concerts du Conservatoire, conducted by Roger Désormière.

== Text structure and scoring ==
In his poems, Messiaen paraphrases verses from the New Testament in "surrealist poetry". The poems can be seen as depicting first a couple's spiritual struggle, then their journey together. In this work, the rhythmic language uses very irregular durations, and certain processes dear to the author: added values, added points, non-retrogradable rhythms, plus some borrowings from Greek metrics and Hindu rhythmics. The "Mi" syllable of the title is a word of affection, imitating a diminutive, and the nickname of the dedicatee.

1. Action de grâces
2. Paysage
3. La Maison
4. Épouvante
5. L'Épouse
6. Ta voix
7. Les deux guerriers
8. Le Collier
9. Prière exaucée

The orchestration is scored for soprano solo, three flutes (third doubling piccolo), two oboes, cor anglais, two clarinets, bass clarinet, three bassoons (third doubling contrabassoon), four horns, three trumpets, three trombones, tuba, percussion (three players) and strings. The duration is given as 32 minutes.

== Recordings ==
Both versions of the song cycle have been recorded.

- Piano version: Lise Arseguet, with Messiaen at the piano
- Piano version: Jane Manning, with pianist David Mason (Unicorn-Kanchana)
- Piano version: Maria Oràn, with pianist Yvonne Loriod. (Erato Records, 1988)
- Felicity Palmer, BBC Symphony Orchestra, conducted by Pierre Boulez, Decca Records, 1973
- Françoise Pollet, Cleveland Orchestra, conducted by Pierre Boulez, Deutsche Grammophon
- Renée Fleming, Orchestre philharmonique de Radio France, conducted by Alan Gilbert, Decca
