= Sept haïkaï =

Sept haïkaï — esquisses japonaises (Seven Haiku: Japanese Sketches) is a composition for piano and small orchestra by Olivier Messiaen. It was published by Alphonse Leduc in 1966 and subsequently reprinted numerous times. It typically lasts about twenty minutes.

== History ==
The set of Sept haïkaï were composed by Messiaen in 1962 after a trip to Japan while he was on honeymoon with his new second wife, Yvonne Loriod. They were influenced by the sounds of Indian rhythms, Gagaku, the music of the Noh theatre, and the birdcalls of Japan, which he had first incorporated in Chronochromie. Messiaen also used an underlying melodic-rhythmic structure similar to the isorhythms used by fourteenth century composers such as Vitry and Machaut.

Sept haïkaï are dedicated to Loriod, Pierre Boulez, Seiji Ozawa, Yoritsune Matsudaira, Sadao Bekku, Mitsuaki Hayama, Fumi Yamaguchi, and "to the landscapes, to the music and to all the birds of Japan". The suite premiered on 30 October 1963, conducted by Boulez, and with Loriod as the piano soloist, at the concerts of the Domaine Musical.

== Instrumentation ==
The piece is scored for solo piano and an orchestra with the following instruments.

Woodwinds
piccolo
flute
2 oboes
cor anglais
2 clarinets
E♭ clarinet
bass clarinet
2 bassoons
Brass
trumpet
trombone

Percussion
triangle
Chinese cymbals
Turkish cymbals
gongs
bells
crotales
cencerros
xylophone
marimba
Strings
8 violins

== Movements ==
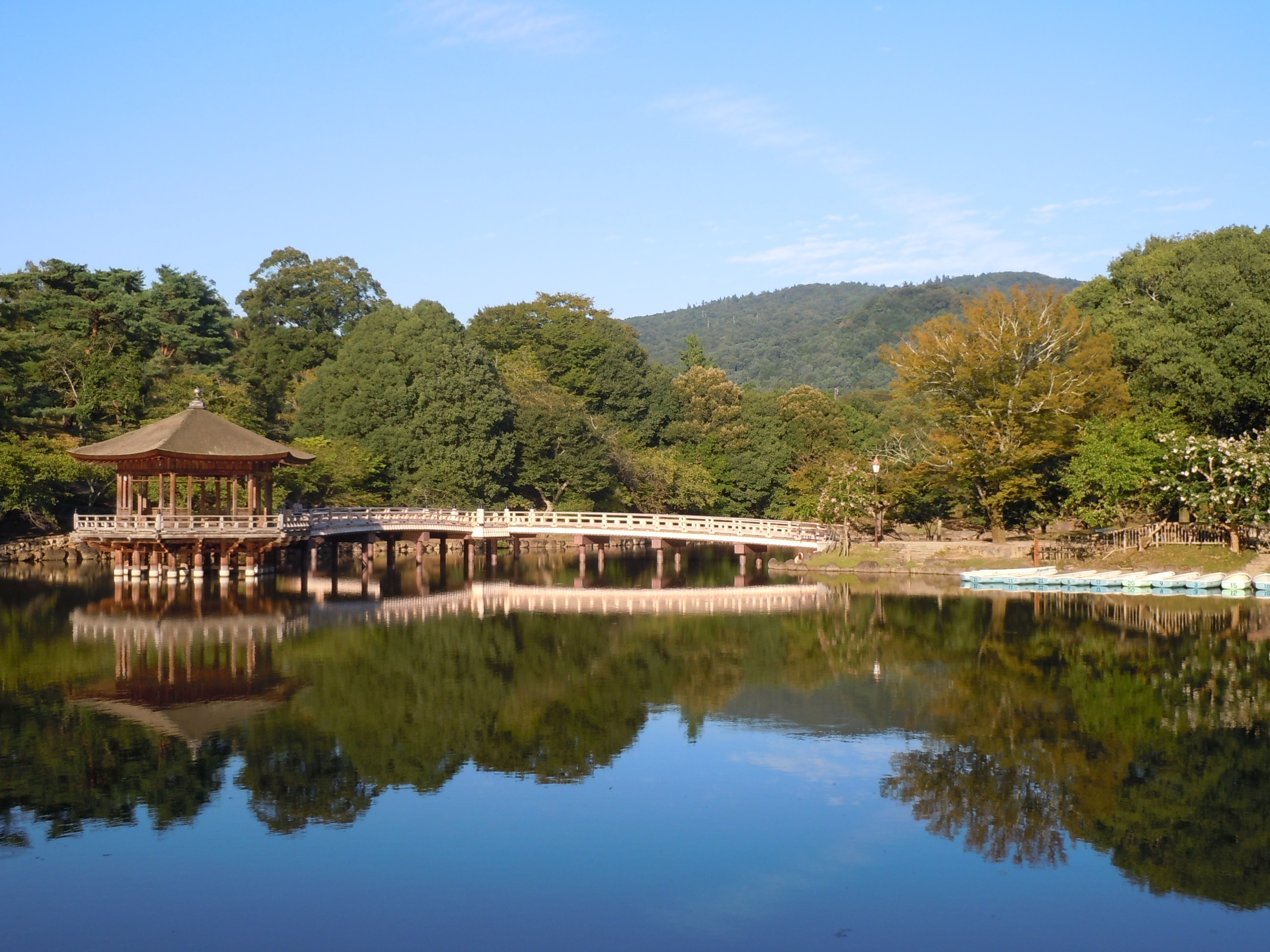
Nara Park, depicted in the second movement

The work is composed of seven movements.

1. Introduction
2. Le parc de Nara et les lanternes de pierre (Nara Park and the Lanterns of Stone)
3. Yamanaka cadenza
4. Gagaku
5. Miyajima et le torii dans la mer (Miyajima and the torii in the sea)
6. Les oiseaux de Karuizawa (The Birds of Karuizawa)
7. Coda
