= Cécile Sauvage =

French poet (1883–1927)

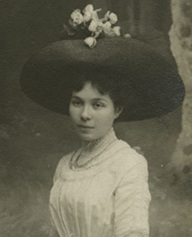
- Portrait of Sauvage
- Born: 20 July 1883; La Roche-sur-Yon
- Died: 26 August 1927 (aged 44); Paris
- Occupation: Poet
- Notable work: L'Âme en bourgeon
- Spouse: Pierre Messiaen (1907-1927)
- Children: Olivier and Alain Messiaen

Cécile Anne Marie Antoinette Sauvage (French pronunciation: [sesil an maʁi ɑ̃twanɛt sovaʒ]; 20 July 1883 – 26 August 1927) was a French poet. She was the author of collections Tandis que la terre tourne (1910) and Le Vallon (1913). Her love poetry was posthumously collected and published by Béatrice Marchal in the volume Cécile Sauvage: Écrits d'amour (2009). Sauvage was the mother of French composer Olivier Messiaen.

In Francophone circles, she is often called the 'poetess of maternity'.

== Biography ==
Sauvage was born in La Roche-sur-Yon on 20 July 1883. Her father, Gal Prosper Sauvage, was a schoolteacher of history, married to Marie-Eugénie Jolivet. In 1888, Sauvage's family moved to Provence, where she subsequently grew up in Digne-les-Bains alongside her younger sister, Germaine, and brother, André.

At twenty years old, Sauvage wrote a long poem, "Les trois Muses" (The Three Muses). Her father, who encouraged his daughter in her literary endeavors, passed along the work to the poet Frédéric Mistral, who further encouraged her to submit to a literary journal. In May 1905, this poem was received at La Revue forézienne, a literary journal based in Saint-Étienne. The journal's editor, Pierre Messiaen, was struck by the composition; Messiaen and Sauvage entered into correspondence that blossomed into romance and were married on 9 September 1907 at a church in Sieyes, near Digne.

In 1907, more of Sauvage's poetry was published in the Parisian literary journal Mercure de France. Sauvage and Messiaen moved to Avignon. The couple's first son, Olivier Eugène Prosper Charles, was born on 10 December 1908.

In 1909, the Sauvage-Messiaen family moved to Ambert in Auvergne, where Messiaen was appointed as a local schoolteacher. In 1910, Sauvage's first full poetry collection, Tandis que la terre tourne, was published with the Parisian publishing house, Mercure de France. One of the subcollections in this work is titled L'Âme en bourgeon (The Soul in Bud): a collection about maternity, inspired by Sauvage's pregnancy with and birth of Olivier, this series of poems has endured as Sauvage's most famous and recognizable work.

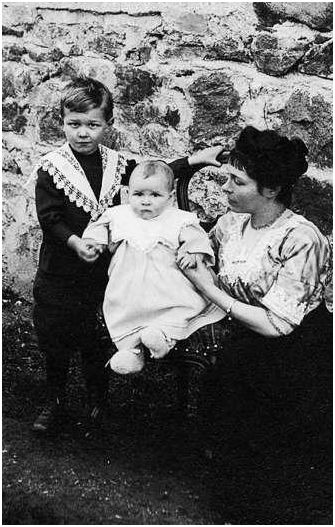
Sauvage with her sons. Ambert, 1913; left to right: Olivier Messiaen, Alain Messiaen, Cécile Sauvage.

On 10 August 1912, Sauvage gave birth to a second son, Alain André Prosper (who would likewise become a poet, while residing with her brother André in Grenoble. In 1913, Sauvage's second collection of poetry, Le Vallon, was published with Mercure de France. Following Pierre Messiaen's appointment as a teacher of English language and literature at a lycée in Nantes, Sauvage moved with her husband and children to Nantes in February 1914.

Following the outbreak of World War I and Pierre Messiaen's being called to serve as an interpreter for the British forces, Sauvage moved to Grenoble and lived there until autumn 1918.

In 1919, the Sauvage-Messiaen family decided to move to Paris so as to allow for Olivier to develop his musical talents at the Conservatoire de Paris. Sauvage apparently wrote extensively during this time period, including several long, now mostly-lost dramas in verse: these were titled Aimer après la mort, Hémérocalle et la guerre and Hémérocalle et l’amour. However, Sauvage published nothing. Her health deteriorated and on 26 August 1927, Sauvage died of tuberculosis at the Hôtel-Dieu de Paris in the presence of her sons and husband.

Pierre Messiaen organized the posthumous publication of a book in praise of Sauvage's work, Cécile Sauvage: Études et souvenirs, issued in 1928 with a Saint-Étienne publisher, Édition des Amitiés. In 1929, Messiaen edited a volume of Sauvage's works for publication with Parisian publisher Mercure de France, titled Œuvres de Cécile Sauvage. This 1929 volume contained previously unpublished poetry collections by Sauvage. However, as Béatrice Marchal has demonstrated, the new material was heavily edited by Messiaen in the course of preparation for publication. Messiaen also released a slim collection of letter extracts penned by Sauvage, Lettres à Pierre Messiaen, in 1930 (Édition des Amitiés).

Family friend and fellow writer Henri Pourrat dedicated a work to Sauvage, titled La Veillée de novembre (1937).

In 2009, Béatrice Marchal transcribed and published manuscripts of love poetry composed by Sauvage between 1914-1915. Marchal demonstrated that these sensual love poems were written by Sauvage to her lover, Jean de Gourmont, an editor at Mercure de France with whom Sauvage had an affair sometime in 1914. Marchal noted that Pierre Messiaen heavily edited portions of these manuscripts for publication in his 1929 Œuvres de Cécile Sauvage. Marchal's 2009 volume reflects a more complete picture of Sauvage's work and transcribes the love poems in their surviving entirety.

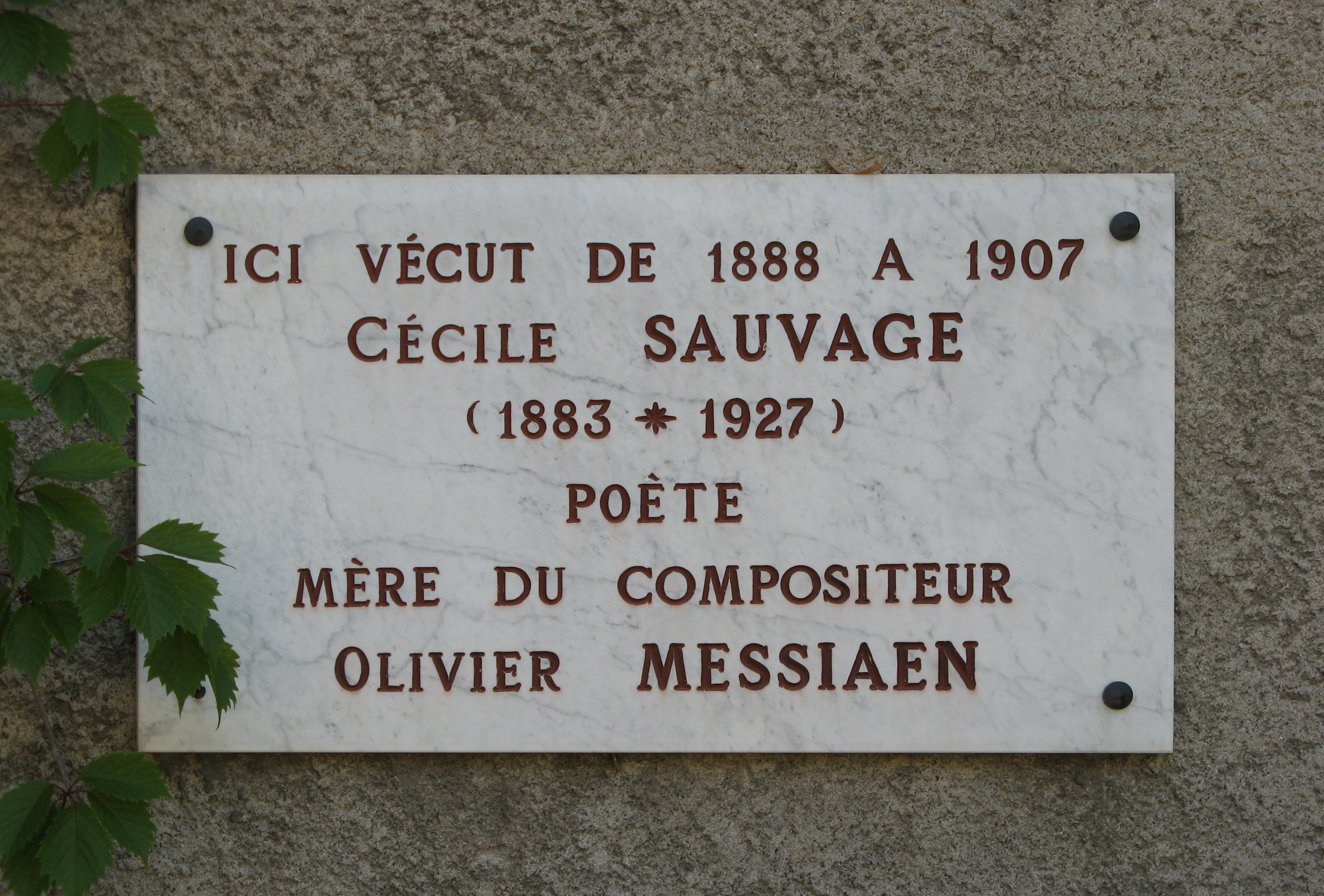
Plaque at her childhood home, avenue de Verdun, Digne-les-Bains

Sauvage's surviving manuscripts and letters are now at the Bibliothèque nationale de France, where they are catalogued under the "Archives privées" of the Fonds Olivier Messiaen et Yvonne Loriod.

== Work ==
- Tandis que la terre tourne, Mercure de France, 1910
- Le Vallon, Mercure de France, 1913
- Œuvres de Cécile Sauvage, Mercure de France, 1929
- Lettres à Pierre Messiaen, Édition des Amitiés, 1930
- L’Âme en bourgeon, Steff, 1955
- L’Âme en bourgeon, Séguier Archimbaud, 1987
- Tandis que la terre tourne, Séguier Archimbaud, 1991
- Œuvres complètes, Table Ronde, 2002. [NB: The title is misleading. This volume is a reproduction of Œuvres de Cécile Sauvage (1929) and as such is not the complete works.]
- Écrits d’amour, Cerf, 2009
