= Chants de Terre et de Ciel =

1938 song cycle by Olivier Messiaen

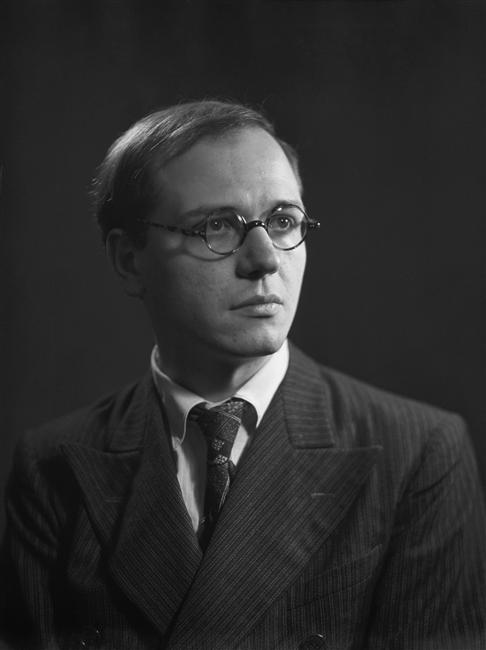
Olivier Messiaen in 1937

Chants de Terre et de Ciel (Songs of Earth and Heaven) is a song cycle in six movements for soprano and piano by Olivier Messiaen, on text by the composer himself. It was composed in 1938 and premiered at the Société Triton's Concerts du Triton, at the École Normale de Musique de Paris in Paris on the 23 January 1939 with Marcelle Bunlet as the soprano and the composer at the piano. The cycle is deeply personal and reflects Messiaen's joy at the birth of his son Pascal in 1937, as well as his deep Catholicism.

== Movements ==
Each movement has a title and a dedication.

1. "Bail avec Mi" (for my wife)
2. "Antienne du silence" (for the day of the Guardian Angels)
3. "Danse du bébé-pilule" (for my little Pascal)
4. "Arc-en-ciel d'innocence" (for my little Pascal)
5. "Minuit pile et face" (for death)
6. "Résurrection" (for Easter Day)

A performance usually lasts around 32 minutes.

== Discography ==
- Maria Oràn, soprano, Yvonne Loriod, piano (+ Poèmes pour Mi); Ed. Erato, 1988
- Hetna Regitze Bruun, soprano, Kristoffer Hyldig, piano (+ Poèmes pour Mi, Vocalise-Étude); Naxos 8.573247, 2015
- Barbara Hannigan, soprano, Bertrand Chamayou, piano; Messiaen Alpha Classics ALPHA1033, 2024
