= Olivier Messiaen =

French composer (1908–1992)

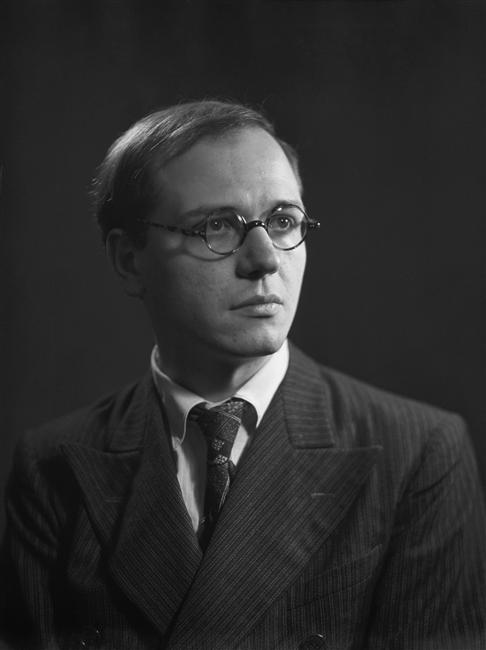
- Born: 10 December 1908; Avignon, France
- Died: 27 April 1992 (aged 83); Clichy, France
- Works: List of compositions
- Spouses: Claire Delbos; Yvonne Loriod

Olivier Eugène Prosper Charles Messiaen (UK: /ˈmɛsiæ̃/, US: /mɛˈsjæ̃, meɪˈsjæ̃, mɛˈsjɒ̃/; French: [ɔlivje øʒɛn pʁɔspɛʁ ʃaʁl mɛsjɑ̃]; 10 December 1908 – 27 April 1992) was a French composer, organist, and ornithologist. One of the major composers of the 20th century, he was also an outstanding teacher of composition and musical analysis.

Messiaen entered the Conservatoire de Paris at age 11 and studied with Paul Dukas, Maurice Emmanuel, Charles-Marie Widor and Marcel Dupré, among others. He was appointed organist at the Église de la Sainte-Trinité, Paris, in 1931, a post he held for 61 years, until his death. He taught at the Schola Cantorum de Paris during the 1930s. After the fall of France in 1940, Messiaen was interned for nine months in the German prisoner of war camp Stalag VIII-A, where he composed his Quatuor pour la fin du temps (Quartet for the End of Time) for the four instruments available in the prison—piano, violin, cello and clarinet. The piece was first performed by Messiaen and fellow prisoners for an audience of inmates and prison guards. Soon after his release in 1941, Messiaen was appointed professor of harmony at the Paris Conservatoire. In 1966, he was appointed professor of composition there, and he held both positions until retiring in 1978. His many distinguished pupils included Iannis Xenakis, Mikis Theodorakis, George Benjamin, Alexander Goehr, Pierre Boulez, Jacques Hétu, Gérard Grisey, Tristan Murail, Karlheinz Stockhausen, György Kurtág, and Yvonne Loriod, who became his second wife.

Messiaen perceived colours when he heard certain musical chords (a phenomenon known as chromaesthesia); according to him, combinations of these colours were important in his compositional process. He travelled widely and wrote works inspired by diverse influences, including Japanese music, the landscape of Bryce Canyon in Utah, and the life of St. Francis of Assisi. His style absorbed many global musical influences, such as Indonesian gamelan (tuned percussion often features prominently in his orchestral works). He found birdsong fascinating, notating bird songs worldwide and incorporating birdsong transcriptions into his music.

Messiaen's music is rhythmically complex. Harmonically and melodically, he employed a system he called modes of limited transposition, which he abstracted from the systems of material his early compositions and improvisations generated. He wrote music for chamber ensembles and orchestra, voice, solo organ, and piano, and experimented with the use of novel electronic instruments developed in Europe during his lifetime. For a short period he experimented with the parametrisation associated with "total serialism", in which field he is often cited as an innovator. His innovative use of colour, his conception of the relationship between time and music, and his use of birdsong are among the features that make Messiaen's music distinctive.

== Biography ==
=== Youth and studies ===
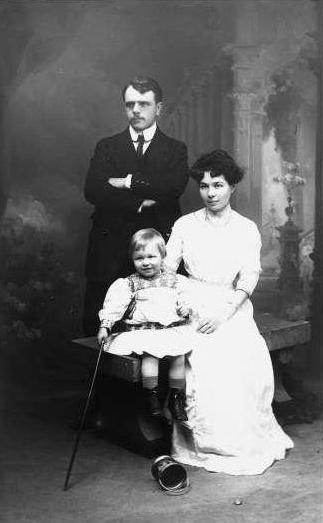
Messiaen with his mother and father in 1910

Olivier Eugène Prosper Charles Messiaen was born on 10 December 1908 at 20 Boulevard Sixte-Isnard in Avignon, France, into a literary family. He was the elder of two sons of Cécile Anne Marie Antoinette Sauvage, a poet, and Pierre Léon Joseph Messiaen, a scholar and teacher of English from a farm near Wervicq-Sud who also translated William Shakespeare's plays into French. Messiaen's mother published a sequence of poems, L'âme en bourgeon (The Budding Soul), the last chapter of Tandis que la terre tourne (As the Earth Turns), which address her unborn son. Messiaen later said this sequence of poems influenced him deeply and cited it as prophetic of his future artistic career. His brother Alain André Prosper Messiaen, four years his junior, became a poet.

At the outbreak of World War I, Pierre enlisted and Cécile took their two boys to live with her brother in Grenoble. There Messiaen became fascinated with drama, reciting Shakespeare to his brother. Their homemade toy theatre had translucent backdrops made of cellophane wrappers. At this time he also adopted the Roman Catholic faith. Later, Messiaen felt most at home in the Alps of the Dauphiné, where he had a house built south of Grenoble. He composed most of his music there.

Messiaen took piano lessons, having already taught himself to play. His interests included the recent music of French composers Claude Debussy and Maurice Ravel, and he asked for opera vocal scores for Christmas presents. He also saved to buy scores, including Edvard Grieg's Peer Gynt, whose "beautiful Norwegian melodic lines with the taste of folk song ... gave me a love of melody". Around this time he began to compose.

In 1918 his father returned from the war and the family moved to Nantes. Messiaen continued music lessons; one of his teachers, Jehan de Gibon, gave him a score of Debussy's opera Pelléas et Mélisande, which Messiaen called "a thunderbolt" and "probably the most decisive influence on me". The next year, his father gained a teaching post at Sorbonne University in Paris. Olivier entered the Paris Conservatoire in 1919, aged 11.

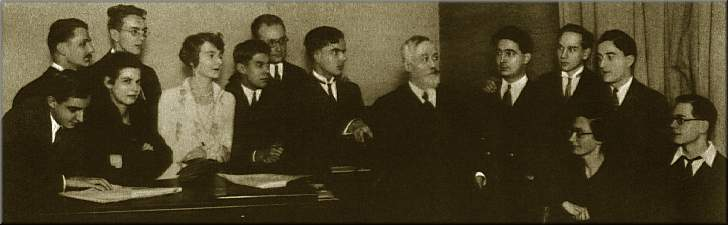
Paul Dukas's composition class at the Paris Conservatoire, 1929. Messiaen sits at the far right; Dukas stands at the centre.

Messiaen made excellent academic progress at the Conservatoire. In 1924, aged 15, he was awarded second prize in harmony, having been taught in that subject by professor Jean Gallon. In 1925, he won first prize in piano accompaniment, and in 1926 he gained first prize in fugue. After studying with Maurice Emmanuel, he was awarded second prize for the history of music in 1928. Emmanuel's example engendered an interest in ancient Greek rhythms and exotic modes. After showing improvisational skills on the piano, Messiaen studied organ with Marcel Dupré. He won first prize in organ playing and improvisation in 1929. After a year studying composition with Charles-Marie Widor, in autumn 1927 he entered the class of the newly appointed Paul Dukas. Messiaen's mother died of tuberculosis shortly before the class began. Despite his grief, he resumed his studies, and in 1930 Messiaen won first prize in composition.

While a student he composed his first published works—his eight Préludes for piano (the earlier Le Banquet céleste for organ was published subsequently). These exhibit Messiaen's use of his modes of limited transposition and palindromic rhythms (Messiaen called these non-retrogradable rhythms). His official début came in 1931 with his orchestral suite Les offrandes oubliées. That year he first heard a gamelan group, sparking his interest in the use of tuned percussion.

=== La Trinité, La jeune France, and Messiaen's war ===
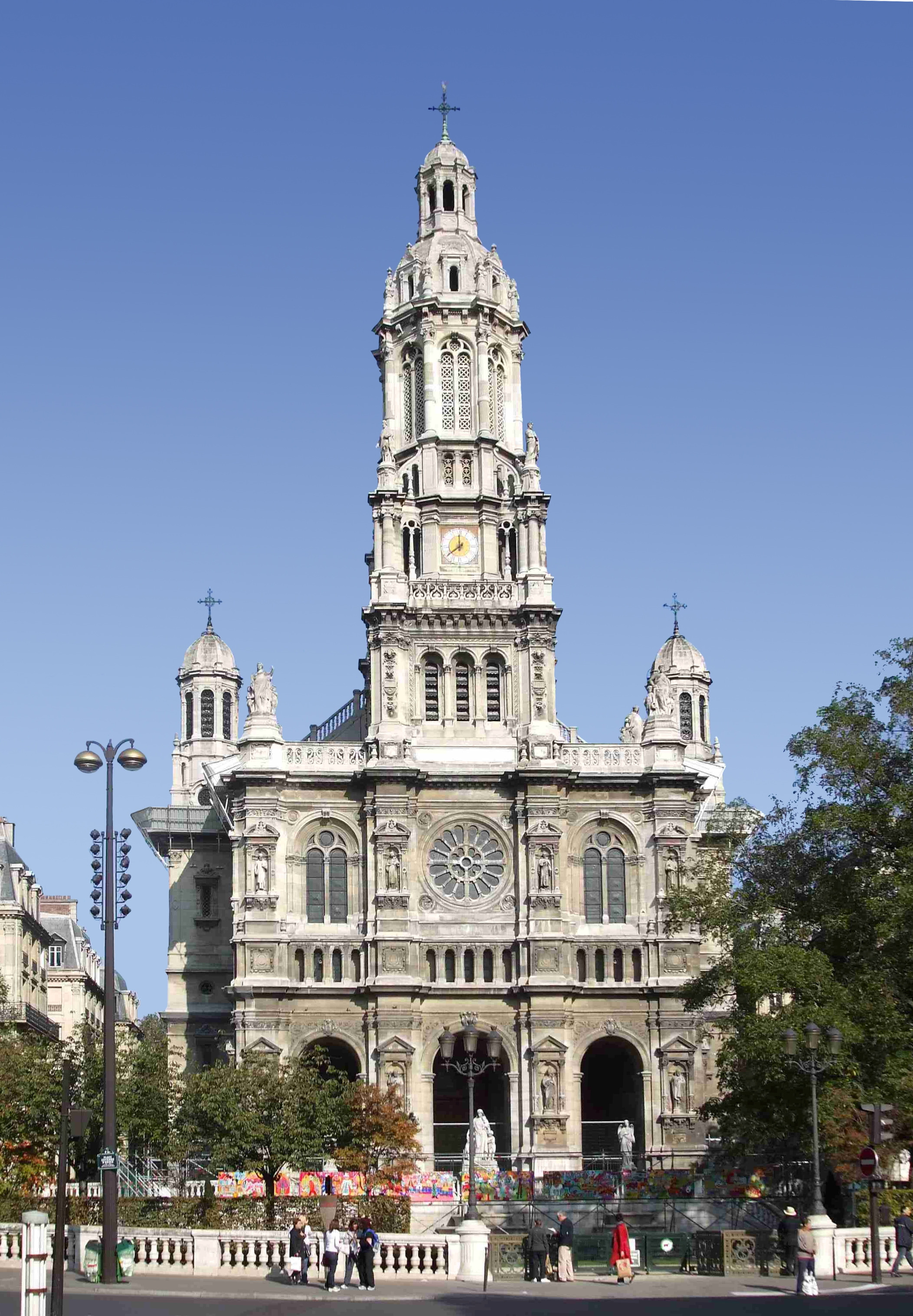
Église de la Sainte-Trinité, Paris, where Messiaen was titular organist for 61 years

In the autumn of 1927, Messiaen joined Dupré's organ course. Dupré later wrote that Messiaen, having never seen an organ console, sat quietly for an hour while Dupré explained and demonstrated the instrument, and then came back a week later to play Johann Sebastian Bach's Fantasia in C minor to an impressive standard. From 1929, Messiaen regularly deputised at the Église de la Sainte-Trinité for the ailing Charles Quef. The post became vacant in 1931 when Quef died, and Dupré, Charles Tournemire and Widor among others supported Messiaen's candidacy. His formal application included a letter of recommendation from Widor. The appointment was confirmed in 1931, and he remained the organist at the church for more than 60 years. He also assumed a post at the Schola Cantorum de Paris in the early 1930s. In 1932, he composed the Apparition de l'église éternelle for organ.

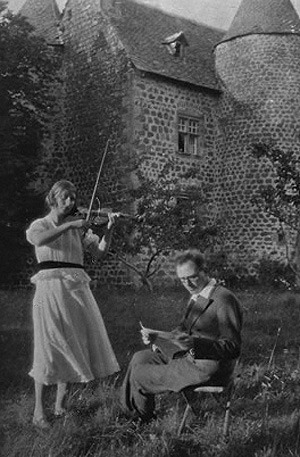
With Claire Delbos

He also married the violinist and composer Claire Delbos (daughter of Victor Delbos) that year. Their marriage inspired him both to compose works for her to play (Thème et variations for violin and piano in the year they were married) and to write pieces to celebrate their domestic happiness, including the song cycle Poèmes pour Mi in 1936, which he orchestrated in 1937. Mi was Messiaen's affectionate nickname for his wife. On 14 July 1937, the Messiaens' son, Pascal Emmanuel, was born; Messiaen celebrated the occasion by writing Chants de Terre et de Ciel. The marriage turned tragic when Delbos lost her memory after an operation toward the end of World War II. She spent the rest of her life in mental institutions.

During this period he composed several multi-movement organ works. He arranged his orchestral suite L'Ascension for organ, replacing the orchestral version's third movement with an entirely new movement, Transports de joie d'une âme devant la gloire du Christ qui est la sienne (Ecstasies of a soul before the glory of Christ which is the soul's own). He also wrote the extensive cycles La Nativité du Seigneur (The Nativity of the Lord) and Les Corps glorieux (The glorious bodies).

In 1936, along with André Jolivet, Daniel Lesur and Yves Baudrier, Messiaen formed the group La jeune France ("Young France"). Their manifesto implicitly attacked the frivolity predominant in contemporary Parisian music and rejected Jean Cocteau's 1918 Le coq et l'arlequin in favour of a "living music, having the impetus of sincerity, generosity and artistic conscientiousness". Messiaen's career soon departed from this polemical phase.

In response to a commission for a piece to accompany light-and-water shows on the Seine during the Paris Exposition, in 1937 Messiaen demonstrated his interest in using the ondes Martenot, an electronic instrument, by composing Fête des belles eaux for an ensemble of six. He included a part for the instrument in several of his subsequent compositions.

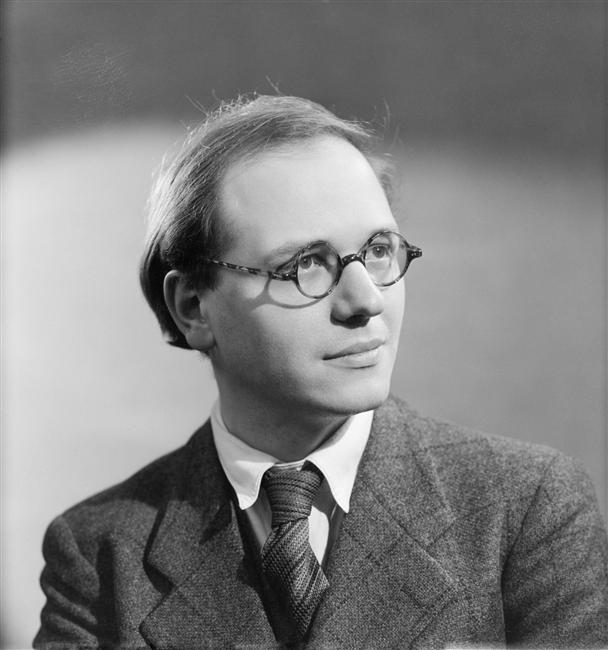
Messiaen by Studio Harcourt (1937)

At the outbreak of World War II, Messiaen was drafted into the French army. Due to poor eyesight, he was enlisted as a medical auxiliary rather than an active combatant. He was captured at Verdun, where he befriended clarinettist Henri Akoka; they were taken to Görlitz in May 1940, and imprisoned at Stalag VIII-A. He met a cellist (Étienne Pasquier) and a violinist (Jean le Boulaire) among his fellow prisoners. He wrote a trio for them, which he gradually incorporated into a more expansive new work, Quatuor pour la fin du Temps ("Quartet for the End of Time"). With the help of a friendly German guard, Carl-Albert Brüll, he acquired manuscript paper and pencils. The work was first performed in January 1941 to an audience of prisoners and prison guards, with the composer playing a poorly maintained upright piano in freezing conditions and the trio playing third-hand unkempt instruments. The enforced introspection and reflection of camp life bore fruit in one of 20th-century classical music's acknowledged masterpieces. The title's "end of time" alludes to the Book of Revelation, and also to the way that Messiaen, through rhythm and harmony, used time in a manner completely different from his predecessors and contemporaries.

The idea of a European Centre of Education and Culture "Meeting Point Music Messiaen" on the site of Stalag VIII-A, for children and youth, artists, musicians and everyone in the region emerged in December 2004, was developed with the involvement of Messiaen's widow as a joint project between the council districts in Germany and Poland, and was completed in 2014.

=== Tristan and serialism ===
Shortly after his release from Görlitz in May 1941, in large part due to the persuasions of his friend and teacher Marcel Dupré, Messiaen, who was now a household name, was appointed a professor of harmony at the Paris Conservatoire, where he taught until he retired in 1978. He compiled his Technique de mon langage musical ("Technique of my musical language"), published in 1944, in which he quotes many examples from his music, particularly the Quartet. Although only in his mid-thirties, his students described him as an outstanding teacher. Among his early students were the composers Pierre Boulez and Karel Goeyvaerts. Other pupils included Karlheinz Stockhausen in 1952, Alexander Goehr in 1956–57, Jacques Hétu in 1962–63, Tristan Murail in 1967–72 and George Benjamin during the late 1970s. The Greek composer Iannis Xenakis was referred to him in 1951; Messiaen urged Xenakis to take advantage of his background in mathematics and architecture in his music.

In 1943, Messiaen wrote Visions de l'Amen ("Visions of the Amen") for two pianos for Yvonne Loriod and himself to perform. Shortly thereafter he composed the enormous solo piano cycle Vingt regards sur l'enfant-Jésus ("Twenty gazes upon the child Jesus") for her. Again for Loriod, he wrote Trois petites liturgies de la présence divine ("Three small liturgies of the Divine Presence") for female chorus and orchestra, which includes a difficult solo piano part.

Two years after Visions de l'Amen, Messiaen composed the song cycle Harawi, the first of three works inspired by the legend of Tristan and Isolde. The second of these works about human (as opposed to divine) love was the result of a commission from Serge Koussevitzky. Messiaen said the commission did not specify the length of the work or the size of the orchestra. This was the ten-movement Turangalîla-Symphonie. It is not a conventional symphony, but rather an extended meditation on the joy of human union and love. It does not contain the sexual guilt inherent in Richard Wagner's Tristan und Isolde because Messiaen believed sexual love to be a divine gift. The third piece inspired by the Tristan myth was Cinq rechants for 12 unaccompanied singers, described by Messiaen as influenced by the alba of the troubadours. Messiaen visited the United States in 1949, where his music was conducted by Koussevitsky and Leopold Stokowski. His Turangalîla-Symphonie was first performed in the US the same year, conducted by Leonard Bernstein.

Messiaen taught an analysis class at the Paris Conservatoire. In 1947 he taught (and performed with Loriod) for two weeks in Budapest. In 1949 he taught at Tanglewood and presented his work at the Darmstädter Ferienkurse. While he did not employ the twelve-tone technique, after three years teaching analysis of twelve-tone scores, including works by Arnold Schoenberg, he experimented with ways of making scales of other elements (including duration, articulation and dynamics) analogous to the chromatic pitch scale. The results of these innovations was the "Mode de valeurs et d'intensités" for piano (from the Quatre études de rythme) which has been misleadingly described as the first work of "total serialism". It had a large influence on the earliest European serial composers, including Boulez and Stockhausen. During this period he also experimented with musique concrète, realizing the electroacoustic work Timbres-durées with the assistance of Pierre Henry.

=== Birdsong and the 1960s ===
When in 1952 Messiaen was asked to provide a test piece for flautists at the Paris Conservatoire, he composed the piece Le Merle noir for flute and piano. While he had long been fascinated by birdsong, and birds had made appearances in several of his earlier works (for example La Nativité, Quatuor and Vingt Regards), the flute piece was based entirely on the song of the blackbird.

He took this development to a new level with his 1953 orchestral work Réveil des oiseaux—its material consists almost entirely of the birdsong one might hear between midnight and noon in the Jura. From this period onward, Messiaen incorporated birdsong into his compositions and composed several works for which birds provide both the title and subject matter (for example the collection of 13 piano pieces Catalogue d'oiseaux completed in 1958, and La fauvette des jardins of 1971). Paul Griffiths observed that Messiaen was a more conscientious ornithologist than any previous composer, and a more musical observer of birdsong than any previous ornithologist.

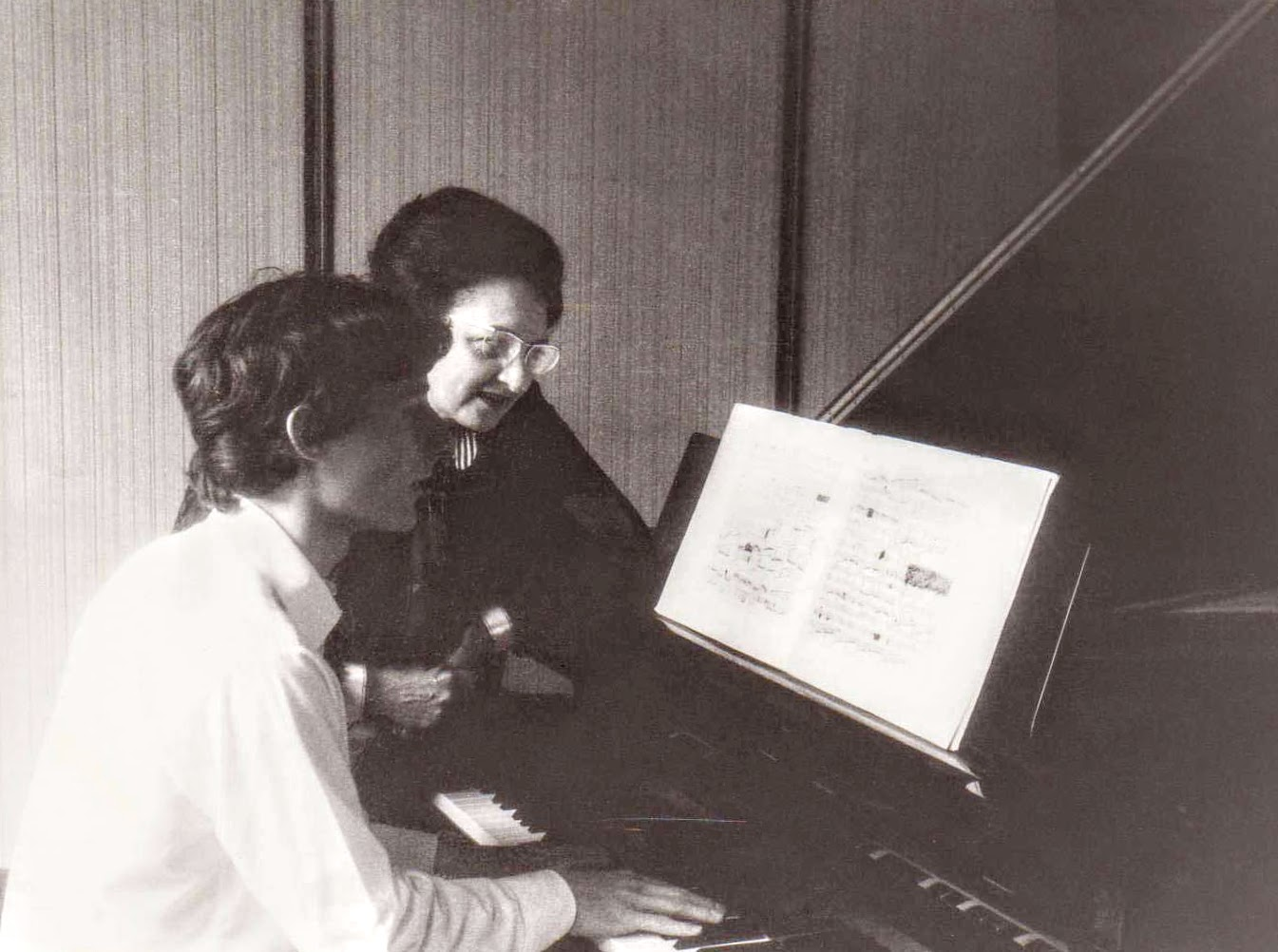
Yvonne Loriod teaching piano (1982)

Messiaen's first wife died in 1959 after a long illness, and in 1961 he married Loriod. He began to travel widely, to attend musical events and to seek out and transcribe the songs of more exotic birds in the wild. Despite this, he spoke only French. Loriod frequently assisted her husband's detailed studies of birdsong while walking with him, by making tape recordings for later reference. In 1962 he visited Japan, where Gagaku music and Noh theatre inspired the orchestral "Japanese sketches", Sept haïkaï, which contain stylised imitations of traditional Japanese instruments.

Messiaen's music was by this time championed by, among others, Boulez, who programmed first performances at his Domaine musical concerts and the Donaueschingen Festival. Works performed included Réveil des oiseaux, Chronochromie (commissioned for the 1960 festival), and Couleurs de la cité céleste. The latter piece was the result of a commission for a composition for three trombones and three xylophones; Messiaen added to this more brass, wind, percussion and piano, and specified a xylophone, xylorimba and marimba rather than three xylophones. Another work of this period, Et exspecto resurrectionem mortuorum, was commissioned as a commemoration of the dead of the two World Wars and was performed first semi-privately in the Sainte-Chapelle, then publicly in Chartres Cathedral with Charles de Gaulle in the audience.

His reputation as a composer continued to grow and in 1959, he was nominated as an Officier of the Légion d'honneur. In 1966, he was officially appointed professor of composition at the Paris Conservatoire, although he had in effect been teaching composition for years. Further honours included election to the Institut de France in 1967 and the Académie des Beaux-arts in 1968, the Erasmus Prize in 1971, the award of the Royal Philharmonic Society Gold Medal and the Ernst von Siemens Music Prize in 1975, the Sonning Award (Denmark's highest musical honour) in 1977, the Wolf Prize in Arts in 1982, and the presentation of the Croix de Commander of the Belgian Order of the Crown in 1980.

=== Transfiguration, Canyons, St. Francis, and the Beyond ===
Messiaen's next work was the large-scale La Transfiguration de Notre Seigneur Jésus-Christ. The composition occupied him from 1965 to 1969 and the musicians employed include a 100-voice ten-part choir, seven solo instruments and large orchestra. Its fourteen movements are a meditation on the story of Christ's Transfiguration. Shortly after its completion, Messiaen received a commission from Alice Tully for a work to celebrate the United States Bicentennial. He arranged a visit to the US in spring 1972, and was inspired by Bryce Canyon in Utah, where he observed the canyon's distinctive colours and birdsong. The 12-movement orchestral piece Des canyons aux étoiles... was the result, first performed in 1974 in New York.

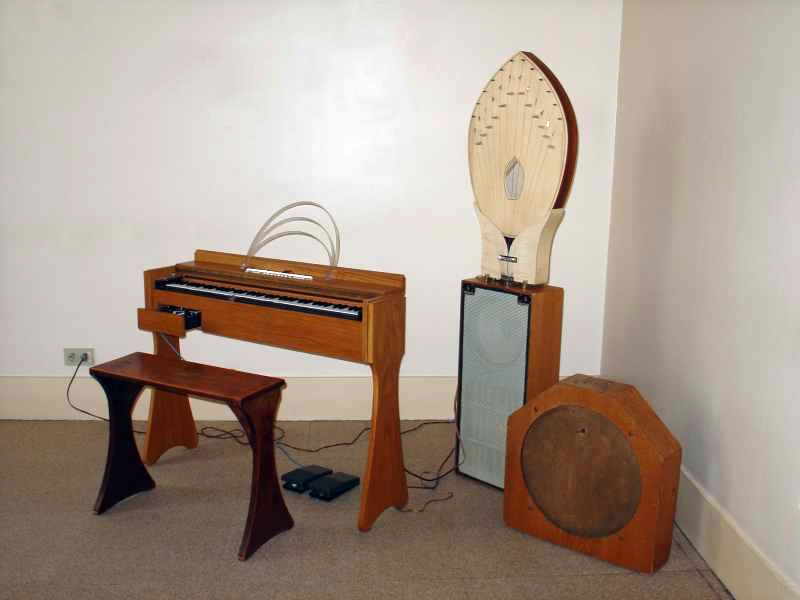
An ondes Martenot, an electronic instrument, for which Messiaen included a part in several of his compositions: the orchestra for his opera Saint François d'Assise includes three of them

In 1971, he was asked to compose a piece for the Paris Opéra. Reluctant to take on such a major project, he was persuaded by French president Georges Pompidou to accept the commission and began work on Saint-François d'Assise in 1975 after two years of preparation. The composition was intensive (he also wrote his own libretto) and occupied him from 1975 to 1979; the orchestration was carried out from 1979 until 1983. Messiaen preferred to describe the final work as a "spectacle" rather than an opera. It was first performed in 1983. Some commentators at the time thought that the opera would be his final work (at times Messiaen himself believed so), but he continued to compose. In 1984, he published a major collection of organ pieces, Livre du Saint Sacrement; other works include birdsong pieces for solo piano, and works for piano with orchestra.

In the summer of 1978, Messiaen was forced to retire from teaching at the Paris Conservatoire due to French law. He was promoted to the highest rank of the Légion d'honneur, the Grand-Croix, in 1987, and was awarded the decoration in London by his old friend Jean Langlais. An operation prevented his participation in the celebration of his 70th birthday in 1978, but in 1988 tributes for Messiaen's 80th included a complete performance in London's Royal Festival Hall of St. François, which the composer attended, and Erato's publication of a 17-CD collection of his music, including a disc of Messiaen in conversation with Claude Samuel.

Although in considerable pain near the end of his life (requiring repeated surgery on his back), he was able to fulfil a commission from the New York Philharmonic Orchestra, Éclairs sur l'Au-Delà..., which premièred six months after his death. He died in the Beaujon Hospital in Clichy, near Paris, on 27 April 1992, aged 83.

On going through his papers, Loriod discovered that, in the last months of his life, he had been composing a concerto for four musicians he felt particularly grateful to: herself, the cellist Mstislav Rostropovich, the oboist Heinz Holliger and the flautist Catherine Cantin (hence the title Concert à quatre). Four of the five intended movements were substantially complete; Loriod undertook the orchestration of the second half of the first movement and of the whole of the fourth with advice from George Benjamin. It was premiered by the dedicatees in September 1994.

== Music ==
Example 1. A page from Oiseaux exotiques. It illustrates Messiaen's use of ancient and exotic rhythms (in the percussion near the bottom of the score "Asclepiad" and "Sapphic" are ancient Greek rhythms, and Nibçankalîla is a decî-tâla from Śārṅgadeva). It also illustrates Messiaen's precision in notating birdsong: the birds identified here are the white-crested laughing thrush (garralaxe à huppe blanche) in the brass and wind instruments, and the orchard oriole (troupiale des vergers) played on the xylophone.

Messiaen's music has been described as outside the western musical tradition, although growing out of that tradition and being influenced by it. Much of his output denies the western conventions of forward motion, development and diatonic harmonic resolution. This is partly due to the symmetries of his technique—for instance the modes of limited transposition do not admit the conventional cadences found in western classical music.

"[Messiaen's youthful] fascination with Shakespeare's depiction of human passion and with his magical world also influenced the composer's later works." Messiaen was not interested in depicting aspects of theology such as sin; rather he concentrated on the theology of joy, divine love and redemption.

Messiaen continually evolved new composition techniques, always integrating them into his existing musical style; his final works still retain the use of modes of limited transposition. For many commentators this continual development made every major work from the Quatuor onwards a conscious summation of all that Messiaen had composed up to that time. But very few of these works lack new technical ideas—simple examples being the introduction of communicable language in Meditations, the invention of a new percussion instrument (the geophone) for Des canyons aux etoiles..., and the freedom from any synchronisation with the main pulse of individual parts in certain birdsong episodes of St. François d'Assise.

As well as discovering new techniques, Messiaen studied and absorbed foreign music, including Ancient Greek rhythms, Hindu rhythms (he encountered Śārṅgadeva's list of 120 rhythmic units, the deçî-tâlas), Balinese and Javanese Gamelan, birdsong, and Japanese music (see Example 1 for an instance of his use of ancient Greek and Hindu rhythms).

While he was instrumental in the academic exploration of his techniques (he compiled two treatises; the second, in five volumes, was substantially complete when he died and was published posthumously), and was a master of music analysis, he considered the development and study of techniques a means to intellectual, aesthetic, and emotional ends. Thus Messiaen maintained that a musical composition must be measured against three separate criteria: it must be interesting, beautiful to listen to, and touch the listener.

Messiaen wrote a large body of music for the piano. Although a considerable pianist himself, he was undoubtedly assisted by Loriod's formidable technique and ability to convey complex rhythms and rhythmic combinations; in his piano writing from Visions de l'Amen onward he had her in mind. Messiaen said, "I am able to allow myself the greatest eccentricities because to her anything is possible."

=== Western influences ===
Developments in modern French music were a major influence on Messiaen, particularly the music of Debussy and his use of the whole-tone scale (which Messiaen called Mode 1 in his modes of limited transposition). Messiaen rarely used the whole-tone scale in his compositions because, he said, after Debussy and Dukas there was "nothing to add", but the modes he did use are similarly symmetrical.

Messiaen had a great admiration for the music of Igor Stravinsky, particularly the use of rhythm in earlier works such as The Rite of Spring, and his use of orchestral colour. He was further influenced by the orchestral brilliance of Heitor Villa-Lobos, who lived in Paris in the 1920s and gave acclaimed concerts there. Among composers for the keyboard, Messiaen singled out Jean-Philippe Rameau, Domenico Scarlatti, Frédéric Chopin, Debussy, and Isaac Albéniz. He loved the music of Modest Mussorgsky and incorporated varied modifications of what he called the "M-shaped" melodic motif from Mussorgsky's Boris Godunov, although he modified the final interval from a perfect fourth to a tritone (Example 3).

Messiaen was further influenced by Surrealism, as seen in the titles of some of the piano Préludes (Un reflet dans le vent..., "A reflection in the wind") and in some of the imagery of his poetry (he published poems as prefaces to certain works, for example Les offrandes oubliées).

=== Colour ===
Colour lies at the heart of Messiaen's music. He believed that terms such as "tonal", "modal" and "serial" are misleading analytical conveniences. For him there were no modal, tonal or serial compositions, only music with or without colour. He said that Monteverdi, Mozart, Chopin, Wagner, Mussorgsky, and Stravinsky all wrote strongly coloured music.

In some of Messiaen's scores, he notated the colours in the music (notably in Couleurs de la cité céleste and Des canyons aux étoiles...)—the purpose being to aid the conductor in interpretation rather than to specify which colours the listener should experience. The importance of colour is linked to Messiaen's synaesthesia, which caused him to experience colours when he heard or imagined music (his form of synaesthesia, the most common form, involved experiencing the associated colours in a non-visual form rather than perceiving them visually). In his multi-volume music theory treatise Traité de rythme, de couleur, et d'ornithologie ("Treatise of Rhythm, Colour and Birdsong"), Messiaen wrote descriptions of the colours of certain chords. His descriptions range from the simple ("gold and brown") to the highly detailed ("blue-violet rocks, speckled with little grey cubes, cobalt blue, deep Prussian blue, highlighted by a bit of violet-purple, gold, red, ruby, and stars of mauve, black and white. Blue-violet is dominant").

When asked what Messiaen's main influence had been on composers, George Benjamin said, "I think the sheer ... colour has been so influential, ... rather than being a decorative element, [Messiaen showed that colour] could be a structural, a fundamental element, ... the fundamental material of the music itself."

=== Symmetry ===
Many of Messiaen's composition techniques made use of symmetries of time and pitch.

==== Time ====
Example 2. The first bar of the piano Prélude, Instants défunts. An early example of Messiaen's use of palindromic rhythms (which he called non-retrogradable rhythms).

From his earliest works, Messiaen used "non-retrogradable" (palindromic) rhythms (Example 2). He sometimes combined isorhythm with non-aligned pitch sequences in such a way that, if the process were repeated indefinitely, the music would eventually run through all possible permutations and return to its starting point. For Messiaen, this represented the "charm of impossibilities" of these processes. He only ever presented a portion of any such process, as if allowing the informed listener a glimpse of something eternal. In the first movement of Quatuor pour la fin du temps the piano and cello together provide an early example.

==== Pitch ====
Messiaen used modes he called modes of limited transposition. They are distinguished as groups of notes that can only be transposed by a semitone a limited number of times. For example, the whole-tone scale (Messiaen's Mode 1) exists in only two transpositions: C–D–E–F♯–G♯–A♯ and D♭–E♭–F–G–A–B. Messiaen abstracted these modes from the harmony of his improvisations and early works. Music written using the modes avoids conventional diatonic harmonic progressions, since for example Messiaen's Mode 2 (an octatonic scale) permits precisely the dominant seventh chords whose tonic the mode does not contain.

=== Time and rhythm ===
Example 3. An excerpt from Danse de la fureur, pour les sept trompettes from Quatuor pour la fin du temps. It illustrates Messiaen's use of additive rhythms—in this example the addition of unpaired semiquavers (sixteenth notes) to an underlying quaver (eighth note) pulse and the lengthening of the final quaver by addition of a dot. It illustrates the use of what Messiaen called the Boris M-shaped motif (the last five notes of the excerpt).

As well as making use of non-retrogradable rhythms and the Hindu decî-tâlas, Messiaen also composed with "additive" rhythms. This involves lengthening individual notes slightly or interpolating a short note into an otherwise regular rhythm (see Example 3), or shortening or lengthening every note of a rhythm by the same duration (adding a semiquaver to every note in a rhythm on its repeat, for example). This led Messiaen to use rhythmic cells that irregularly alternate between two and three units, a process that also occurs in Stravinsky's The Rite of Spring, which Messiaen admired.

A factor that contributes to Messiaen's suspension of the conventional perception of time in his music is the extremely slow tempos he often specifies (the fifth movement Louange à l'eternité de Jésus of Quatuor is actually given the tempo marking infiniment lent). Messiaen also used the concept of "chromatic durations", for example in his Soixante-quatre durées from Livre d'orgue, which is built from, in Messiaen's words, "64 chromatic durations from 1 to 64 demisemiquavers [thirty-second notes]—invested in groups of 4, from the ends to the centre, forwards and backwards alternately—treated as a retrograde canon. The whole peopled with birdsong."

=== Harmony ===
Example 4. The song of the golden oriole from Le loriot, part of Catalogue d'oiseaux. The birdsong played by the pianist's left hand (notated on the lower staff) provides the fundamental notes, and the quieter harmonies played by the right hand alter their timbre.

In addition to making harmonic use of the modes of limited transposition, Messiaen cited the harmonic series as a physical phenomenon that gives chords a context he felt was missing in purely serial music. An example of Messiaen's use of this phenomenon, which he called "resonance", is the last two bars of his first piano Prélude, La colombe ("The dove"; see Example 5): the chord is built from harmonics of the fundamental note E.

Messiaen also composed music in which the lowest, or fundamental, note is combined with higher notes or chords played much more quietly. These higher notes, far from being perceived as conventional harmony, function as harmonics that alter the timbre of the fundamental note like mixture stops on an organ. An example is the song of the golden oriole in Le loriot of the Catalogue d'oiseaux for solo piano (Example 4).

In his use of conventional diatonic chords, Messiaen often transcended their historical connotations (for example, with his frequent use of the added sixth chord as a resolution).

Example 5. The complete two-page score of La colombe.

=== Birdsong ===
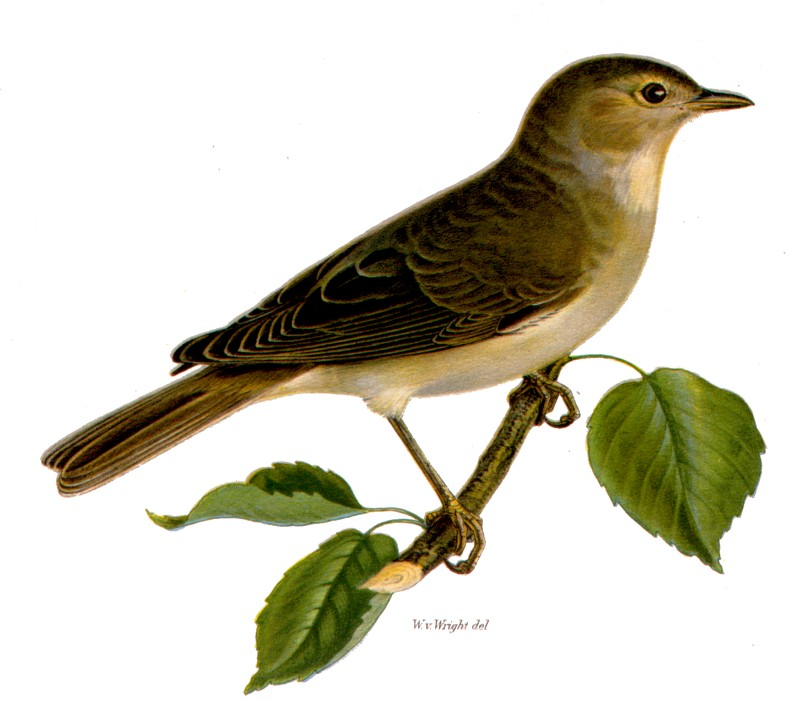
The garden warbler provided the title and much of the material for Messiaen's La fauvette des jardins.

Birdsong fascinated Messiaen from an early age, and in this he found encouragement from Dukas, who reportedly urged his pupils to "listen to the birds". Messiaen included stylised birdsong in some of his early compositions (including L'abîme d'oiseaux from the Quatuor pour la fin du temps), integrating it into his sound-world by techniques like the modes of limited transposition and chord colouration. His evocations of birdsong became increasingly sophisticated, and with Le réveil des oiseaux this process reached maturity, the whole piece being built from birdsong: in effect it is a dawn chorus for orchestra. The same can be said for "Epode", the five-minute sixth movement of Chronochromie, which is scored for 18 violins, each playing a different birdsong. Messiaen notated the bird species with the music in the score (examples 1 and 4). The pieces are not simple transcriptions; even the works with purely bird-inspired titles, such as Catalogue d'oiseaux and Fauvette des jardins, are tone poems evoking the landscape, its colours and atmosphere.

=== Serialism ===
For a few compositions, Messiaen created scales for duration, attack and timbre analogous to the chromatic pitch scale. He expressed annoyance at the historical importance given to one of these works, Mode de valeurs et d'intensités, by musicologists intent on crediting him with the invention of "total serialism".

Messiaen later introduced what he called "communicable language", a "musical alphabet" to encode sentences. He first used this technique in his Méditations sur le Mystère de la Sainte Trinité for organ, where the "alphabet" includes motifs for the concepts to have, to be and God, while the sentences encoded feature sections from the writings of Thomas Aquinas.

== Honors and awards ==
- Grand Cross of the Order of Legion of Honour (1986)
- Grand Cross of the Ordre National du Mérite (1983)
- Commander of the Ordre des Arts et des Lettres (1980)
- Commander of the Order of the Crown (Belgium) (1990)
- Commander of the Order of the Oak Crown (1982)
- Commander of the Order of Merit of the Federal Republic of Germany (1980)

== Writings ==
- Messiaen, Olivier (1933). Vingt leçons de solfège modernes. Paris: Editions H. Lemoine. OCLC 1080796385.
- —— (1936). "Ariane et Barbe-Bleue de Paul Dukas". La Revue musicale. No. 116. pp. 79–86.
- —— (31 March 1938). "Les sept chorals-poèmes pour les sept paroles du Christ en croix". Le monde musical. No. 3. p. 34.
- —— (May 1938). "L'orgue mystique de Tournemire". Syrinx. pp. 26–27.
- —— (1939). "Le rythme chez Igor Strawinsky". La Revue musicale. No. 191. pp. 91–92.
- —— (1939). Vingt leçons d'harmonie. Paris: Alphonse Leduc. OCLC 843636910.
- —— (1944). Technique de mon langage musical. Paris: Alphonse Leduc. OCLC 690654311.
- —— (1946). Preface. Mana: Six pièces pour piano. By Jolivet, André. Paris: Costallat. OCLC 884442941.
- —— (1947). "Maurice Emmanuel: ses "Trente chansons bourguignonnes"". La Revue musicale. No. 206. pp. 107–108.
- —— (1958). "Musikalisches Glaubens-bekenntnis". Melos (in German). No. 25/12. pp. 381–385.
- —— (1960). Conférence de Bruxelles. Paris: Alphonse Leduc. OCLC 855187. Essentially a republishing of Messiaen 1958.
- —— (1970). Preface. La prophétie musicale dans l'histoire de l'humanité précédée d'une étude sur les nombres et les planètes dans leur rapports avec la musique. By Roustit, Albert. Roanne: Horvath.
- —— (1978). Conférence de Notre Dame. Paris: Alphonse Leduc. OCLC 4354577.
- —— (1986). Messiaen on Messiaen: The Composer Writes about His Works. Bloomington: Frangipani Press. OCLC 911921727.
- —— (1987). Les 22 concertos pour piano de Mozart. Paris: Librairie Séguier. OCLC 928373831.
- —— (1988). Conférence de Kyoto. Introduction and Japanese translation by Naoko Tamamura. Paris: Alphonse Leduc. OCLC 22921969.
- —— (1991). Preface. Tandis que la terre tourne. By ——. Paris: Librairie Séguier. OCLC 463610307.
- —— (1994–2002). Traité de rythme, de couleur, et d'ornithologie (7 volumes). Paris: Alphonse Leduc. OCLC 931220676.
- ——; Loriod, Yvonne. Analyses des oeuvres pour piano de Maurice Ravel. Paris: Éditions Durand. OCLC 995326437.

== See also ==
- Olivier Messiaen Competition

== Notes ==
=== Sources ===
- Bannister, Peter (2013). "Olivier Messiaen (1908–1992)". In Anderson, Christopher S. (ed.). Twentieth-century Organ Music. New York: Routledge. ISBN 978-1-136-49790-2.
- Benitez, Vincent P. (2008). Olivier Messiaen: A Research and Information Guide. New York and London: Routledge. ISBN 978-0-415-97372-4.
- Benitez, Vincent P. (2018). Olivier Messiaen: A Research and Information Guide, 2nd ed. New York and London: Routledge. ISBN 978-0-367-87354-7.
- Dingle, Christopher (2007). The Life of Messiaen. Cambridge & New York: Cambridge University Press. ISBN 978-0-521-63547-9.
- Dingle, Christopher (2013). Messiaen's final works. Burlington, VT: Ashgate. ISBN 978-0-7546-0633-8.
- Dingle, Christopher; Simeone, Nigel, eds. (2007). Olivier Messiaen: Music, Art and Literature. Aldershot: Ashgate. ISBN 978-0-7546-5297-7.
- Gillock, Jon (2009). Performing Messiaen's Organ Music: 66 Masterclasses. Bloomington, Indiana: Indiana University Press. ISBN 978-0-253-35373-3.
- Griffiths, Paul (1985). Olivier Messiaen and the Music of Time. Ithaca, New York: Cornell University Press. ISBN 978-0-8014-1813-6.
- Heller, Karin (2010). "Olivier Messiaen and Cardinal Jean-Marie Lustiger". In Shenton, Andrew (ed.). Messiaen the theologian. Farnham: Ashgate. ISBN 978-0-7546-6640-0.
- Hill, Peter, ed. (1995). The Messiaen Companion. London: Faber and Faber. ISBN 978-0-571-17033-3.
- Hill, Peter; Simeone, Nigel (2005). Messiaen. New Haven and London: Yale University Press. ISBN 978-0-300-10907-8.
- Hill, Peter; Simeone, Nigel, eds. (2007). Olivier Messiaen: Oiseaux exotiques. Aldershot: Ashgate. ISBN 978-0-7546-5630-2.
- Iddon, Martin (2013). New Music at Darmstadt: Nono, Stockhausen, Cage, and Boulez. Music since 1900. Cambridge: Cambridge University Press. ISBN 978-1-107-03329-0.
- Kraft, David (2013). Birdsong in the Music of Olivier Messiaen. London: Arosa Press. ISBN 978-1-4775-1779-6.
- Matossian, Nouritza (1986). Xenakis. London: Kahn and Averill. ISBN 978-1-871082-17-3.
- Pople, Anthony (1998). Messiaen: Quatuor pour la fin du temps. Cambridge: Cambridge University Press. ISBN 978-0-521-58538-5.
- Rischin, Rebecca (2003). For the End of Time: The Story of the Messiaen Quartet. Ithaca, N.Y.: Cornell University Press. ISBN 978-0-8014-4136-3.
- Samuel, Claude (tr. E. Thomas Glasow) (1994). Olivier Messiaen: Music and Color: Conversations with Claude Samuel. Portland, Oregon: Amadeus Press. ISBN 978-0-931340-67-3.
- Shenton, Andrew (2008). Olivier Messiaen's System of Signs: Notes towards Understanding his Music. Aldershot: Ashgate. ISBN 978-0-7546-6168-9.
- Shenton, Andrew (2010). Messiaen the Theologian. Aldershot: Ashgate. ISBN 978-0-7546-6640-0.
- Sherlaw Johnson, Robert (1975). Messiaen. Berkeley and Los Angeles: University of California Press. ISBN 978-0-520-02812-8.
- Simeone, Nigel (2009). "'Un oeuvre simple, solennelle...'". In Shenton, Andrew (ed.). Messiaen the theologian. Farnham: Ashgate. ISBN 978-0-7546-6640-0.
