= Yvonne Loriod =

French musician (1924–2010)

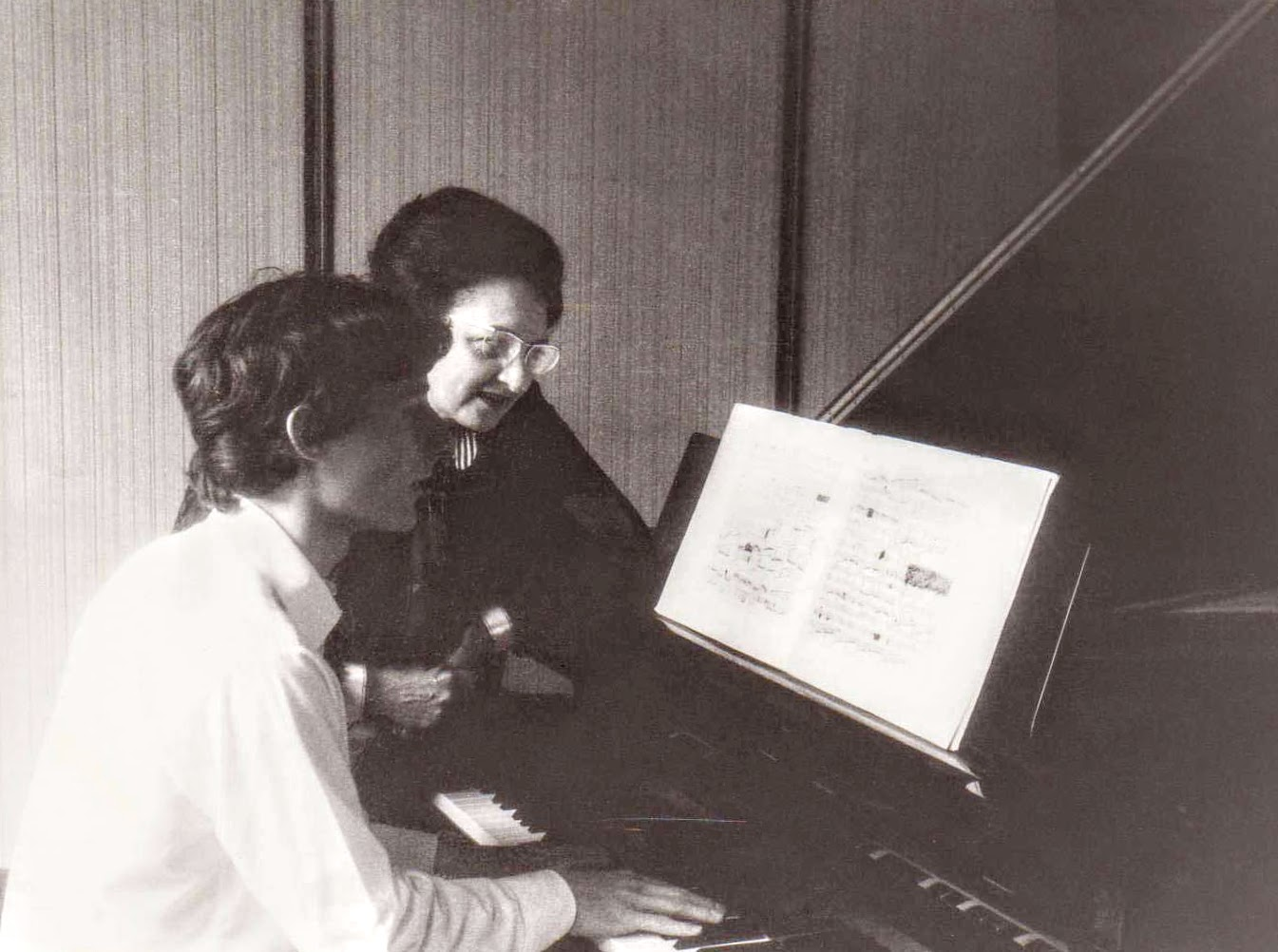
Loriod teaching piano at the Conservatoire de Paris to François Weigel (3 June 1982)

Yvonne Louise Georgette Loriod-Messiaen (French pronunciation: [ivɔn lɔʁjo]; 20 January 1924 – 17 May 2010) was a French pianist, teacher, and composer, and the second wife of composer Olivier Messiaen. Her sister was the Ondes Martenot player Jeanne Loriod.

== Biography ==
Loriod was born in Houilles, Yvelines to Gaston and Simone Loriod. Initially receiving piano lessons from her godmother, she later studied at the Paris Conservatoire and became one of Olivier Messiaen's most avid pupils. She also studied with Isidor Philipp, Lazare Lévy then Marcel Ciampi. She went on to become a nationally acclaimed recording artist and concert pianist and premiered most of Messiaen's works for the piano, starting in the 1940s. Messiaen said that he was able to indulge in "the greatest eccentricities" when writing for piano, knowing that they would be mastered by Loriod. Both she and her sister Jeanne often performed as the soloists in his Turangalîla-Symphonie. Loriod also orchestrated part of Messiaen's final orchestral work, Concert à quatre.

Loriod gave the French premiere of Béla Bartók's Piano Concerto No. 2 in 1945, having learnt it in only eight days.

In 1961, Loriod married Olivier Messiaen following the death of his long institutionalized first wife, Claire Delbos. She is generally considered to be the most important interpreter of Messiaen's piano works. In her later years, she and Messiaen acted as mentors to the pianist Pierre-Laurent Aimard, who has since become a great champion of the works of Messiaen.

Olivier Messiaen died in April 1992 in Saint-Denis. She survived him by 18 years and died on 17 May 2010 in Paris, aged 86.

== Compositions ==
- Pièce sur la souffrance, for orchestra
- Mélopées africaines, for Ondes Martenot, piano and flute (1945)
- Grains de cendre, for soprano and chamber orchestra (1946)

== Publications ==
- Messiaen, Olivier. Traité de rythme, de couleur, et d’ornithologie (1949–1992) ("Treatise on rhythm, colour and ornithology"), completed by Yvonne Loriod. 7 parts bound in 8 volumes. Paris: Leduc, 1994–2002.
- Messiaen, Olivier. Analyses of the Piano Works of Maurice Ravel, edited by Yvonne Loriod, translated by Paul Griffiths. [Paris]: Durand, 2005.

== Selected recordings ==
- Olivier Messiaen: Catalogue d'oiseaux

Label Erato, STU 70595 à 598
1971

- Olivier Messiaen: Turangalîla Symphonie

Label: Deutsche Grammophon, 31781
12 May 1992

- Olivier Messiaen: Vingt Regards sur l'enfant-Jésus

Label: Erato, 4509-91705-2
3 August 1993
