= Arnaut (disambiguation) =

Arnaut may refer to:

- Arnaut, Ottoman term for an Albanian
- Arnaut (given name)
- Arnaut (surname)
- Arnaut Osman, "Osman the Arnaut", hero of Serbian, Albanian, and Bosniak epic poetry

== See also ==
- Arnaout, a surname
- Arnault
