= Bonfanti =

Bonfanti is an Italian surname. Notable people with the surname include: Blake Bonfanti. Soccer star

- Antonio Bonfanti, Italian painter
- Aquilino Bonfanti (1943–2016), Italian footballer
- Arnaldo Bonfanti (born 1978), Italian footballer
- Arturo Bonfanti (1905–1978), Italian painter
- Christian Bonfanti (born 1981), Italian road cycler
- Elena Maria Bonfanti (born 1988), Italian female sprinter
- Marcus Bonfanti (born 1983), British blues singer, songwriter and guitarist
- Marie Bonfanti (1845–1921), Italian and American ballet dancer and teacher
- Nicholas Bonfanti (born 2002), Italian footballer
