= Arnaut (surname) =

Arnaut, sometimes spelled Arnăut, is a surname of two possible origins. It may be derived from Arnaut, the Ottoman Turkish ethnonym for Albanians. It may also be a cognate with English Arnold, Catalan Arnau, French Arnaud and Spanish Arnaldo. Notable people with the surname include:

- António Arnaut (1936–2018), Portuguese Minister of Social Affairs
- Damir Arnaut (born 5 May 1975) is a Bosnian politician, diplomat, and lawyer
- Goran Arnaut (born 1979), Serbian footballer
- Răzvan Arnăut (born 1998), Romanian Greco-Roman wrestler

== See also ==
- Arnault
- Arnaut (given name)
