= Sophie Lacaze =

French composer (born 1963)

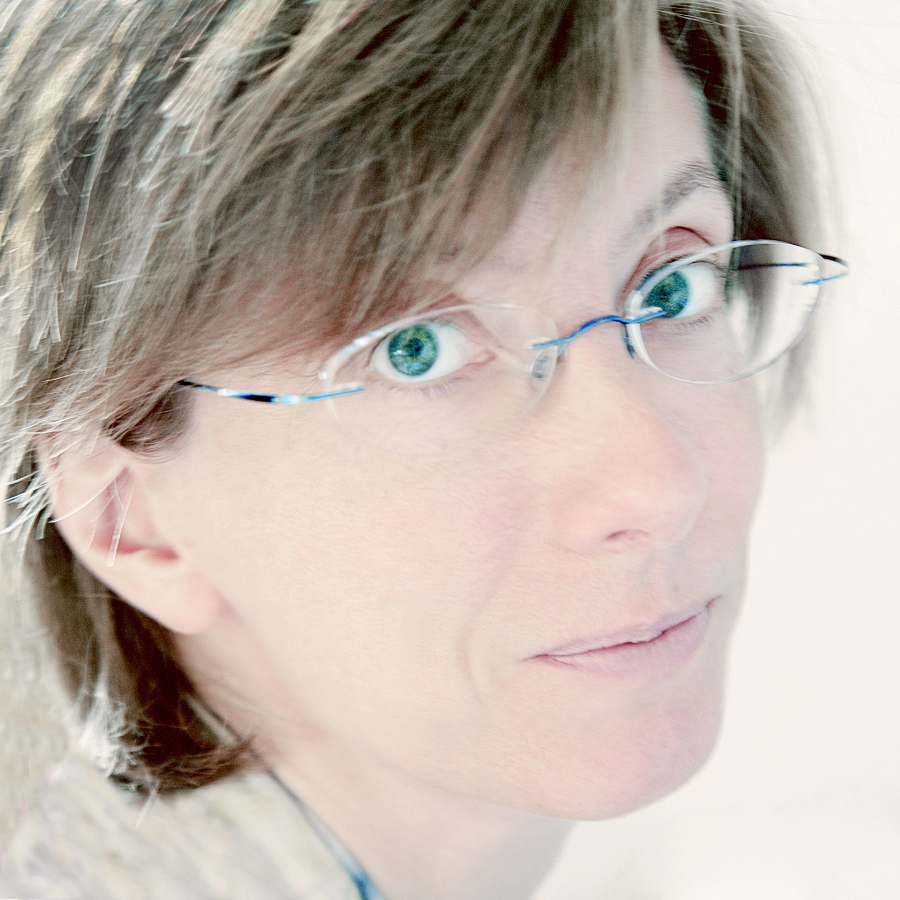
Sophie Lacaze, composer

Sophie Lacaze (born 9 September 1963) is a French composer.

== Life ==
Lacaze was born in Lourdes. She studied music at the Conservatoire de Toulouse, and continued at the Ecole Normale de Musique de Paris, where she received the Composition Prize. Afterwards, she studied with Allain Gaussin, Philippe Manoury and Antoine Tisné in France, and with Franco Donatoni and Ennio Morricone in Italy. She also engaged in music theatre with Georges Aperghis at the Centre Acanthes, and attended Pierre Boulez's courses in Collège de France. In 2002, she was invited for a residency at the Electronic Music Unit of the Elder Conservatorium of Music, University of Adelaide (Australia).

After having travelled in several countries, especially in Australia and Belgium, she came back to France in 2006.

In 2009, she was the first woman to receive the Grand Prix Lycéen des Compositeurs (France), and in 2010, the SACEM gave her the Claude Arrieu Prize for her body of work. In 2012, she was a laureate of the Beaumarchais-SACD association. In 2023, Lacaze won the ‘100 femmes de culture’ award, which aims to highlight the inspiring and creative voices of French-speaking women in the arts.

Her compositions, which range from works for solo instruments to chamber and orchestral music, as well as three operas and works with tape, are regularly performed in more than 20 countries by leading ensembles and orchestras including the BBC Symphony Orchestra, the Orchestre Philharmonique de Radio France, the Luxembourg Philharmonic Orchestra, the Orchestre national des Pays de la Loire, the Orchestre national d'Auvergne, I Solisti Veneti, the National Radio Orchestra of Romania and the French Flute Orchestra.

Sophie Lacaze is also a committed artist who champions classical and contemporary music. She founded, and for several years directed, the Printemps Musical d'Annecy, a multi-disciplinary festival with a section dedicated to musical creation. She then went on to direct the Turbulences Sonores Festival in Montpellier, in collaboration with musicologist Guilherme Carvalho. In September 2018, she was appointed director of the Musiques Démesurées festival in Clermont-Ferrand.

In March 2013, with pianist Nathalie Négro, she founded the French association of women composers Plurielles 34, of which she was president until September 2020.

She taught composition and music history at the Université Paul Valéry in Montpellier for twelve years.

== Selected works ==
- (1992): Trois melodies, for soprano voice and string trio. On poems by Jules Supervielle.
- (1993): Voyelles, for flute. On a poem by Arthur Rimbaud.
- (1996): En Quete, for female voice, narrator, violin and piano. For an exhibition of photographs by Guy Bompais. On texts by Jean-Pierre Rosnay.
- (1997): La vita e bella ?, for flute and cello.
- (1998): Le Becut, for wind instrument, didgeridoo, children choir and small percussions.
- (1999): Comme une rue pavee, for violin, clarinet and piano.
- (2000): Broken Words, for flute and string trio. On a poem by Henry Kendall.
- (2000): And then there was the sun in the sky, for flute, didgeridoo and flute orchestra.
- (2002): Histoire sans paroles, for violin, cello and piano.
- (2002): Voices of Australia, for solo flute and recorded voices.
- (2002): L'enfance de Catherine, for flute and string trio. Music for the film "l'enfance de Catherine" by Anne Baudry.
- (2003): Messe de Nostre Dame, version for 8 female voices and percussions. Tribute to "Messe de Nostre Dame" by Guillaume de Machaut.
- (2003): Tarantella, for piano.
- (2004): Dreaming, chamber opera for two female voices, didgeridoo, flute, viola, percussions and tape.
- (2005): Oceans, for flute, bassoon, violin, viola, double-bass, children choir and small percussions.
- (2005): Cinq Voyelles pour Quatre Flutes, transcription of "Voyelles" for 4 flutes. On a poem by Arthur Rimbaud.
- (2005): Py, for flute and piano.
- (2005): Het Lam Gods, for string quartet. On "Het Lam Gods" by Hubert and Jan Van Eyck.
- (2005): Duo, for voice and tape.
- (2006): Archelogos I, for voice and tape.
- (2006): Les quatre elements, concerto for flute, children choir and percussions.
- (2006): Deux mouvements, for tenor saxophone and orchestra.
- (2006): Musique de la mer, for clarinet, bassoon, string quartet, children choir and small percussions.
- (2006): Vents du sud, electroacoustic work. For the exhibition of photographs "Vignes" by Guy Bompais.
- (2006): The great flood, for alt-saxophone and saxophone ensemble.
- (2007): Archelogos II, for bass-flute and tape.
- (2007): Het Lam Gods II, for flute and flute orchestra. On "Het Lam Gods" by Hubert and Jan Van Eyck.
- (2007): Fenouillet I, acousmatic short piece.
- (2008): Quatre haikus, for alt-saxophone and piano.
- (2008): Le Petit Prince, music for theatre, for ondes Martenot, flute and string trio.
- (2008): Archèlogos IIb, for Martenot waves and tape.
- (2009): L'art est le plus beau des mensonges, for soprano voice and Japanese bowls or soprano and vibraphone. On a text by Alain Carre.
- (2009): Het Lam Gods III, for flute quartet and narrator. On "Het Lam Gods" by Hubert and Jan Van Eyck and a text by Alain Carre.
- (2010): L'espace et la flûte - Variations sur des textes de Jean Tardieu, for narrator and flute orchestra. On texts by Jean Tardieu.
- (2010): Souffles, for four flautists (2 zamponias, 2 bajones, 3 Boehm flutes).
- (2011): Marco Polo, chamber opera for choir and ensemble.
- (2011): Calligrammes, for barytone, choir and saxophone quartet. On texts by Guillaume Apollinaire.
- (2011): Après avoir contemplé la lune, for orchestra.
- (2012): Estampes, for flute quartet.
- (2013): O Sapientia, for 4 or 5 women voices. On texts by Hildegard von Bingen.
- (2013): Immobilité sérieuse I, for piano and string orchestra.
- (2013): Jesous ahatonhia, for saxophone quartet.
- (2014): Maye, for percussion instruments.
- (2014): Un parapluie et un manteau de paille, short work for piano.
- (2015): Voyelles, version for alto saxophone.
- (2015): Au milieu de la plaine, for flute and harp.
- (2015): Voices of Australia, for soprano saxophone and recorded voices.
- (2016): And Earth breathes and And birds sing, for circle flute or flute quartet.
- (2016): Vents du sud, acousmatic work.
- (2017): Je vois passer l'Ange, for 3 women voices and alto saxophone.
- (2017): Ahatonhia again, for clarinet quartet.
- (2017): Y aparece el sol, for flute, didgeridoo and string orchestra.
- (2018): And Earth moves away, for flute quartet.
- (2019): Bur Buk Boon, for didgeridoo and children orchestra.
- (2020): Immobilité sérieuse II, for cello and string orchestra.
- (2021): Vers les étoiles, for piano.
- (2022): Sighs of stars, for orchestra.
- (2022): Chansons d'hiver, short work for string quartet.
- (2022): Chanson d'automne, short work for narrator, clarinet and string quartet. On a poem by Paul Verlaine.
- (2022): Chansons de printemps, short work for accordion and string quartet.
- (2022): Chanson d'été, short work for wind quintet.
- (2023): L'étoffe inépuisable du rêve, chamber opera for 1 actor, 3 singers, didgeridoo, flute, clarinet, string quartet and percussion instruments.
- (2023): Het Lam Gods IV, for narrator and string quartet. On "Het Lam Gods" by Hubert and Jan Van Eyck and a text by Alain Carre.
- (2024): Reminiscences, for viola.
- (2024): Instantanés, for string quartet.
- (2024): De la Terre à Himalia, for string orchestra.
- (2024): A la surface de l'eau, for soprano voice and piano. On texts by Taigu Ryôkan, Kobayashi Issa, Ono no Komachi and Yosa Buson.
- (2024): Un papillon s'envole, for mezzo-soprano voice and string quartet. On texts by Kobayashi Issa, Ono no Komachi and Yosa Buson.
- (2025): Enough has been said, for wind quintet and string quintet.
- (2025): Traversées, for string sextet (2 violins, 2 violas, 2 cellos)

== Discography ==
- "Jean-Yves Fourmeau & guests", Mémoire du Saxophone collection, Saxiana (France), 2026. With Quatre haikus, for alto saxophone and piano, by Jean-Yves Fourmeau and Martin Surot.
- "Noûs", Vous ne rêvez pas encore… (France), 2024. With Maye, for vibraphone and gong, and And Earth moves away for flute quartet, by the ensemble PTYX.
- "En songe", Klarthe (France), 2024. With L'art est le plus beau des mensonges, for voice and Japanese bowls, by Anne Warthmann.
- Il pleut des voix de femmes, Paraty (France), 2023. With Je vois passer l'Ange, En Quête, Fauvette, Il pleut des voix de femmes and O Sapientia by Els Janssens, Mora Vocis - voix solistes au féminin (Els Janssens, Caroline Marçot, Isabelle Deproit, Céline Boucard), Alain Carré (narrator), Michel Supéra (saxophone) and Marie Vermeulin (piano).
- "Metamorphose", Ethan Nylander (USA), 2023. With Archèlogos II, for bass flute and tape, by Ethan Nylander.
- "Les femmes dansent", Klarthe (France), 2021. With Tarantella, for piano, by Axia Marinescu.
- "Accents", Aparté (France), 2021. With Histoire sans paroles, for violin, cello and piano, by musicians of the ensemble K (artistic director: Simone Menezes): Manon Galy (violin), Kacper Nowak (cello) and Mara Dobresco (piano).
- "Fair_Play 2", Fair_Play network (France), 2018. With the 1st movement of Deux mouvements, for tenor saxophone and orchestra, by Daniel Kientzy and the Romanian National Radio Orchestra, conductor Horia Andreescu.
- "Fair_Play One", Fair_Play network (France), 2017. With Vents du Sud, acousmatic work.
- "7 saxophones autour du monde", Nova Musica (France), 2016. With Deux mouvements for tenor saxophone and orchestra, by Daniel Kientzy and the Romanian National Radio Orchestra, conductor Horia Andreescu.
- "Souffles", Les Editions de l'Astronome, 2012. With L'espace et la flute, En quete, Quatre haikus, Voyelles and Het Lam Gods III, by Alain Carre, Baudoin Giaux, Jean-Yves Fourmeau, Amaya Dominguez, Martin Surot, Hinemoa Quartet and Royal Conservatory of Brussels flute ensemble.
- "Encounters / Rencontre", AF Adelaide (Australia), 2012. With two Preludes for piano, by Stephen Whittington.
- "Sophie Lacaze - Works with flutes", Solal (Germany), 2008. With Het Lam Gods II, Voices of Australia, Archelogos II, And then there was the sun in the sky, Cinq voyelles pour quatre flutes, Py and Les quatre elements by Pierre-Yves Artaud, French Flute Orchestra (conductor Pierre-Alain Biget), Phillip Peris, Fuminori Tanada and Michel de Maulne.
- "Cosmogonies", Galun Records, 2005. With Voices of Australia by Ivan Bellocq.
- "Plurielles", Maguelone, 2004. With Broken Words and Voyelles by the Helios Ensemble and Christel Rayneau.
- "Aperto (Re)Forms", Gaudeamus (Roumania), 2000. With Comme une rue pavee and Trois preludes by the Trio Aperto and Dolores Chelariu.
- "En Quete", Galun Records, 2000. With En Quete, Kulungalinpa, La Vita e Bella ?, Jetez-vous sur l'avenir and Le Becut. By Marie Kobayashi, Marcelle Rosnay, Ivan Bellocq, Mie Ogura, Phillip Peris, Fuminori Tanada, Lucie Bessiere, Marie-Agnes Letellier, Arnaud Limonaire, Paul Broutin, Bernard Vandenbroucque, and children of Lappacca (in Lourdes) and Parc Suzanne (in Argeles Gazost) primary schools.
- "Musiques francaises du XXe siecle", REM, 1996. With Voyelles by Chiharu Tachibana.

== Awards and recognition ==
- 2025 : Chevalière of the ordre des Arts et des Lettres

== Bibliography ==
- "Sophie Lacaze, portrait of a composer", by Geneviève Mathon, Editions Delatour, 160 pages, May 2021.
- "Sophie Lacaze, portrait d'une compositrice", by Geneviève Mathon, Editions Delatour, 160 pages, May 2018.
- La stoffa inesauribile di cui sono fatti i sogni - Intervista alla compositrice francese Sophie Lacaze, prima donna a ricevere il Grand Prix Lycéen des Compositeurs - , Weekly news and culture magazine Azione, July 2024. By Davide Fersini.
- Portraits - Sophie Lacaze - , les Inrocks supplement "Au coeur de la Création" (at the heart of creation), p. 15, April 2023, by Jerome Provençal.
- "La musique pour flûte(s) de Sophie Lacaze" - Traversiere Magazine n°104, 2012. Official magazine of French Flute Association (in French).
- "La música de los cuatro elementos" - by Genevieve Mathon (translation Alberto Leongómez H.) about "Les quatre elements", concerto for flute, children choir and small percussion instruments by Sophie Lacaze, in “(Pensiamento), (palabra)… Y oBra”, Revista de la Facultad de la Universidad Pedagogica Nacional de Bogotà, Colombia (2014).
- "Interpreting a cappella music in 20th- and 21st-century France", The project A cappella Impromptu, June 2014, Universität für Musik und darstellende Kunst, Graz, by Anaïs Maillard de la Morandais, p. 26.
- "Compositrices l'égalité en actes", with an article about Sophie Lacaze by Geneviève Mathon, Éditions MF, 2019.
- "Compositrices françaises au XXe siècle", Association Femmes et Musique, with an article about Sophie Lacaze by Michèle Friang, p. 103-105, Editions Delatour France .
- "Composer profile: Sophie Lacaze" - by David Leone, Musicakaleidoscope, July 2014 .
- "L'annuaire des expertes", Club de la presse du Languedoc-Roussillon, Femmes & Medias, June 2016, p. 72.

== References and External links ==
- Sophie Lacaze's official website.
- Page on Comité du Coeur SACEM - Prix Claude Arrieu
- Page on the Centre de documentation de la musique contemporaine website
- Page on Publisher's website - BabelScores
- Page on Publisher's website - Editions Artchipel
- Page on Publisher's website - Editions Delatour France
- Esquisse-portrait on Musiquecontemporaine.info
- a short-film about Sophie Lacaze - Mezzo Compo / Sacem
- Interview by Stretta Music, 2023
- Interview by Musiques Démesurées Festival, 2021
- Interview by Suzanne Gervais, for la Lettre du Musicien, 2019
- Page on BNF - Bibliotheque Nationale de France
- Page on Contemporary Music Portal
- Page on Tout l'opéra (ou presque)
- Page on the Expertes' website
- Sophie Lacaze's YouTube channel
- Wikipedia website in French
