= List of diplomatic missions of Bosnia and Herzegovina =

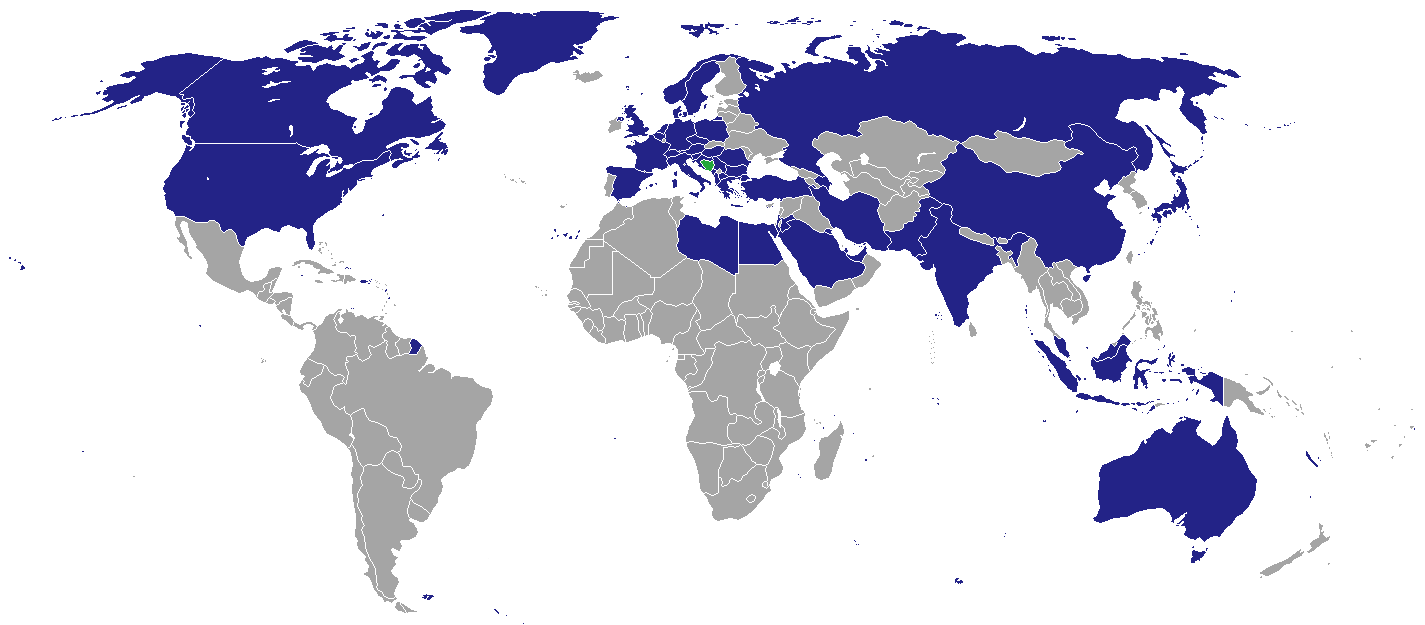
Diplomatic missions of Bosnia and Herzegovina (blue)

This is a list of diplomatic missions of Bosnia and Herzegovina, excluding honorary consulates.

Bosnia and Herzegovina, as of 2025, has 47 embassies, 8 consulates in 5 countries, and 6 diplomatic missions.

== Africa ==
Host country	Host city	Mission	Head of mission	Concurrent accreditation	Ref.
Egypt	Cairo	Embassy	Sabit Subašić, ambassador	Ethiopia; Kenya; Nigeria; Sudan	
Libya	Tripoli	Embassy	Senad Mašović, ambassador	Tunisia	

== Americas ==
Host country	Host city	Mission	Head of mission	Concurrent accreditation	Ref.
Canada	Ottawa	Embassy	Daniela Čolić, counsellor	Cuba	
United States	Washington, D.C.	Embassy	Sven Alkalaj, ambassador	Brazil; Mexico	
United States	Chicago	Consulate-General	Tatjana Telić, consul-general		

== Asia ==
Host country	Host city	Mission	Head of mission	Concurrent accreditation	Ref.
China	Beijing	Embassy	Siniša Berjan, ambassador	Mongolia	
India	New Delhi	Embassy	Haris Hrle, ambassador		
Indonesia	Jakarta	Embassy	Armin Limo, ambassador	Singapore; Timor-Leste	
Iran	Tehran	Embassy	Nijaz Čardaklija, ambassador	Tajikistan; Turkmenistan	
Israel	Tel Aviv	Embassy	Duško Kovačević, ambassador	Cyprus	
Japan	Tokyo	Embassy	Mato Zeko, ambassador	Republic of Korea	
Jordan	Amman	Embassy	Slavko Matanović, ambassador	Iraq; Lebanon; Palestine; Syria	
Kuwait	Kuwait City	Embassy	Nusret Čančar, ambassador		
Malaysia	Kuala Lumpur	Embassy	Edin Jahić, ambassador	Brunei; Thailand; Vietnam	
Pakistan	Islamabad	Embassy	Emin Čohodarević, ambassador	Afghanistan	
Qatar	Doha	Embassy	Ahmet Halilović, ambassador		
Saudi Arabia	Riyadh	Embassy	Razim Čolić, ambassador		
Turkey	Ankara	Embassy	Mirsada Čolaković, ambassador	Azerbaijan; Georgia	
Turkey	Istanbul	Consulate-General	Enisa Komar, consul-general		
United Arab Emirates	Abu Dhabi	Embassy	Bojan Đokić, ambassador	Bahrain	

== Europe ==
Host country	Host city	Mission	Head of mission	Concurrent accreditation	Ref.
Albania	Tirana	Embassy	Jasmin Gagula, ambassador		
Austria	Vienna	Embassy	Siniša Bencun, ambassador		
Belgium	Brussels	Embassy	Erol Avdović, ambassador	Luxembourg	
Bulgaria	Sofia	Embassy	Aleksandra Mičić, ambassador		
Croatia	Zagreb	Embassy	Elma Kovačević-Bajtal, ambassador		
Croatia	Rijeka	Consulate-General			
Czech Republic	Prague	Embassy	Martina Mlinarević, ambassador	Slovakia	
Denmark	Copenhagen	Embassy	Anesa Kundurović Miljak, ambassador	Latvia; Lithuania	
France	Paris	Embassy	Bojana Kondić Panić, ambassador	Algeria; Andorra; Monaco	
Germany	Berlin	Embassy	Damir Arnaut, ambassador		
Germany	Frankfurt	Consulate-General	Višnja Lončar, consul-general		
Germany	Munich	Consulate-General	Robert Burić, consul-general		
Germany	Stuttgart	Consulate-General	Vera Sajić, consul-general		
Greece	Athens	Embassy	Dragan Vuković, ambassador		
Holy See	Rome	Embassy (Note: The Bosnian Embassy to the Holy See is located outside Vatican territory in Rome.)	Igor Žontar, ambassador		
Hungary	Budapest	Embassy	Biljana Gutić-Bjelica, ambassador	Moldova; Ukraine	
Italy	Rome	Embassy	Amira Arifović-Harms, ambassador	Malta; San Marino	
Italy	Milan	Consulate-General	Dag Đumurkić, consul-general		
Montenegro	Podgorica	Embassy	Branimir Jukić, ambassador		
Netherlands	The Hague	Embassy	Almir Šahović, ambassador	Portugal	
North Macedonia	Skopje	Embassy	Dragan Jaćimović, ambassador		
Norway	Oslo	Embassy	Hoda Dedić, ambassador	Iceland	
Poland	Warsaw	Embassy	Koviljka Špirić, ambassador		
Romania	Bucharest	Embassy	Milorad Živković, ambassador		
Russia	Moscow	Embassy	Ivan Orlić, ambassador	Armenia; Belarus; Kazakhstan; Kyrgyzstan; Uzbekistan	
Serbia	Belgrade	Embassy	Aleksandar Vranješ, ambassador		
Serbia	Novi Pazar	Consulate-General			
Slovenia	Ljubljana	Embassy	Dario Novalić, ambassador		
Spain	Madrid	Embassy	Vesna Andree Zaimović, ambassador	Morocco	
Sweden	Stockholm	Embassy	Bojan Šošić, ambassador	Estonia; Finland	
Switzerland	Bern	Embassy	Boro Bronza, ambassador	Liechtenstein	
United Kingdom	London	Embassy	Osman Topčagić, ambassador	Ireland	

== Oceania ==
Host country	Host city	Mission	Head of mission	Concurrent accreditation	Ref.
Australia	Canberra	Embassy	Kemal Muftić, ambassador	New Zealand	

== International Organizations ==
Host organization	Mission	Head	Ref.
Organization for Security and Co-operation in Europe	Vienna	Danka Savić, ambassador	
European Union	Brussels	Obrad Kesić, ambassador	
Council of Europe	Strasbourg	Haris Bašić, ambassador	
NATO	Brussels	Vanja Filipović, ambassador	
United Nations	New York City	Zlatko Lagumdžija, ambassador	
United Nations	Geneva	Bojan Vujić, ambassador	

== Gallery ==
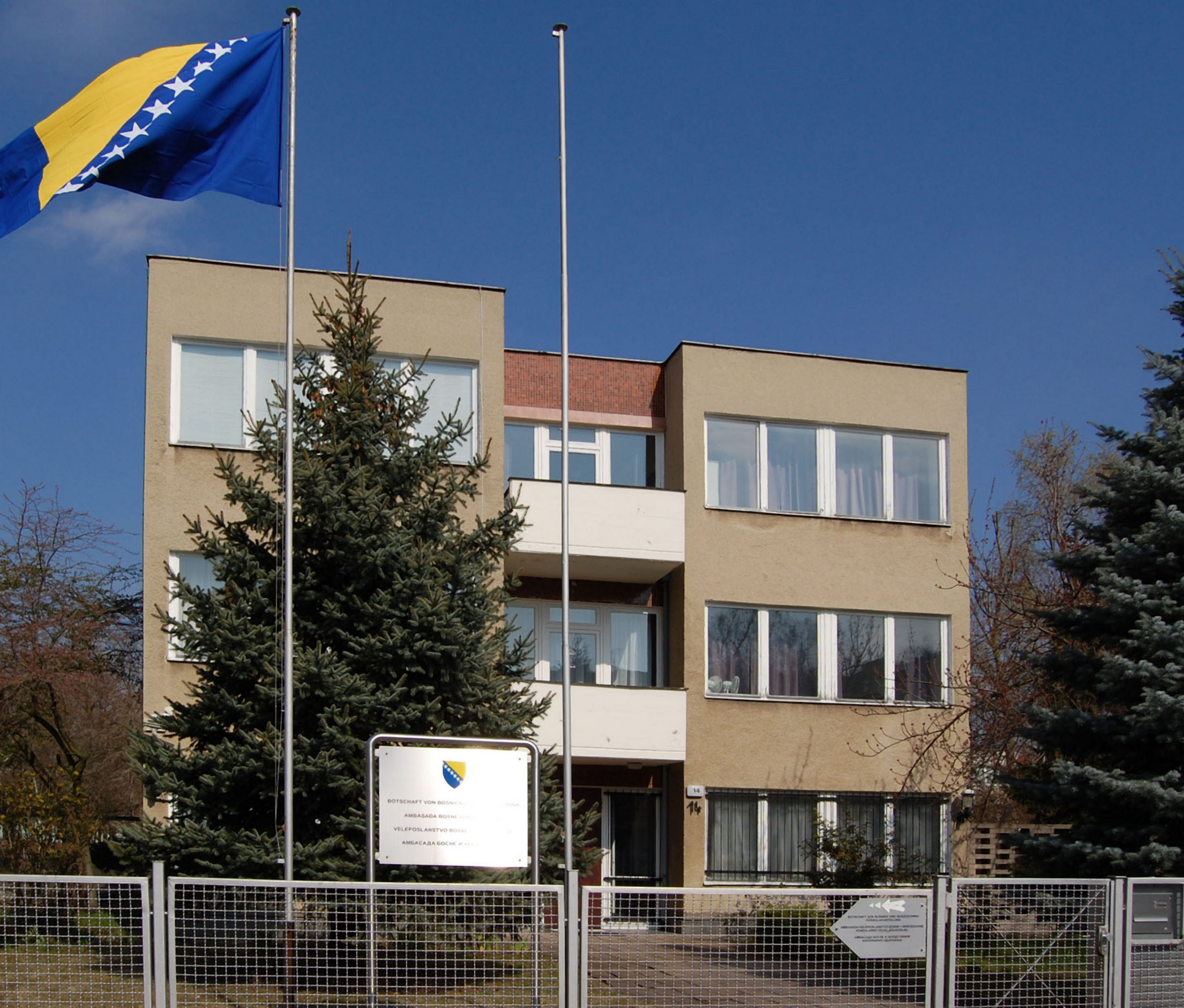
Embassy in Berlin

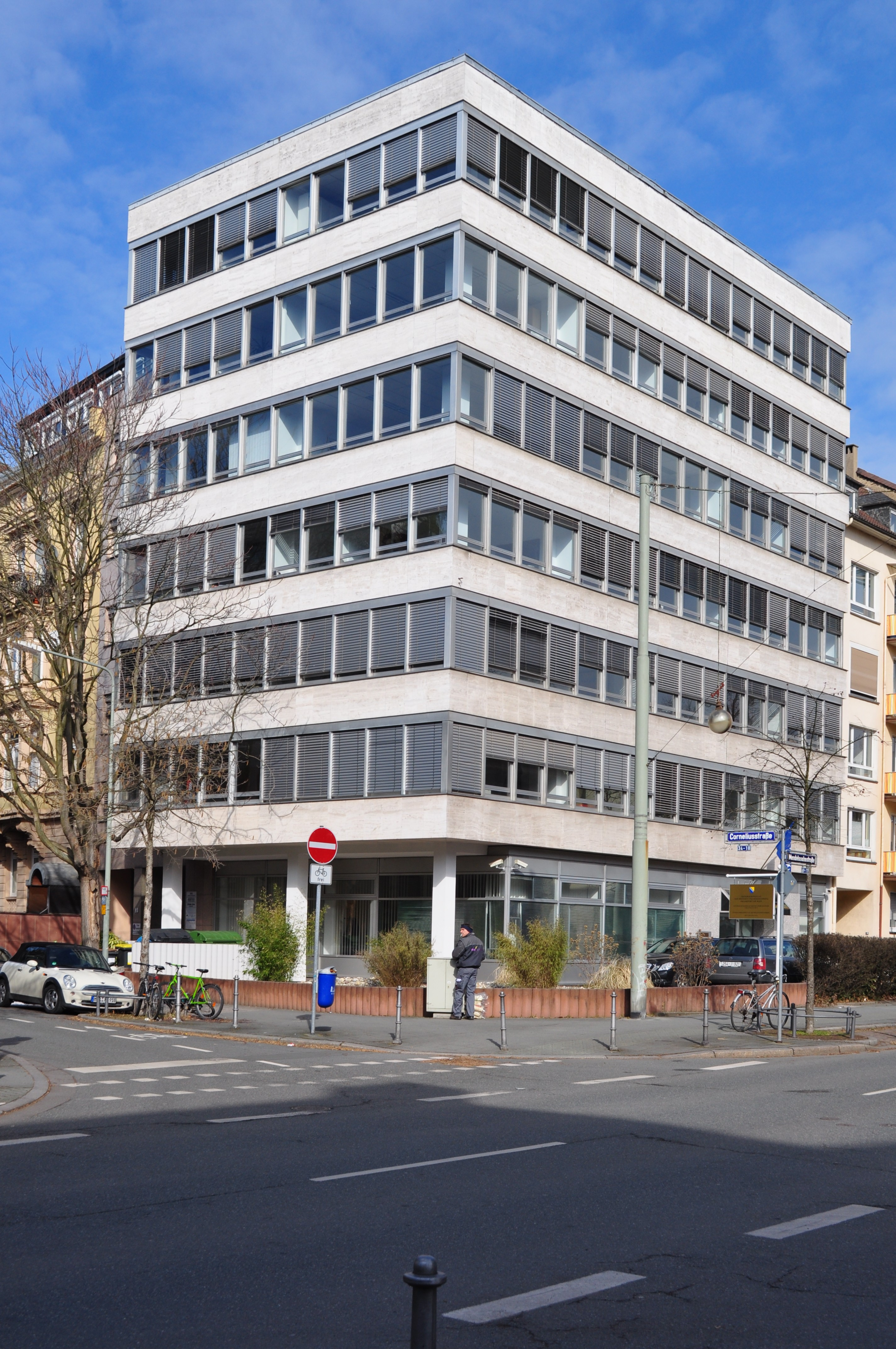
Consulate-General in Frankfurt

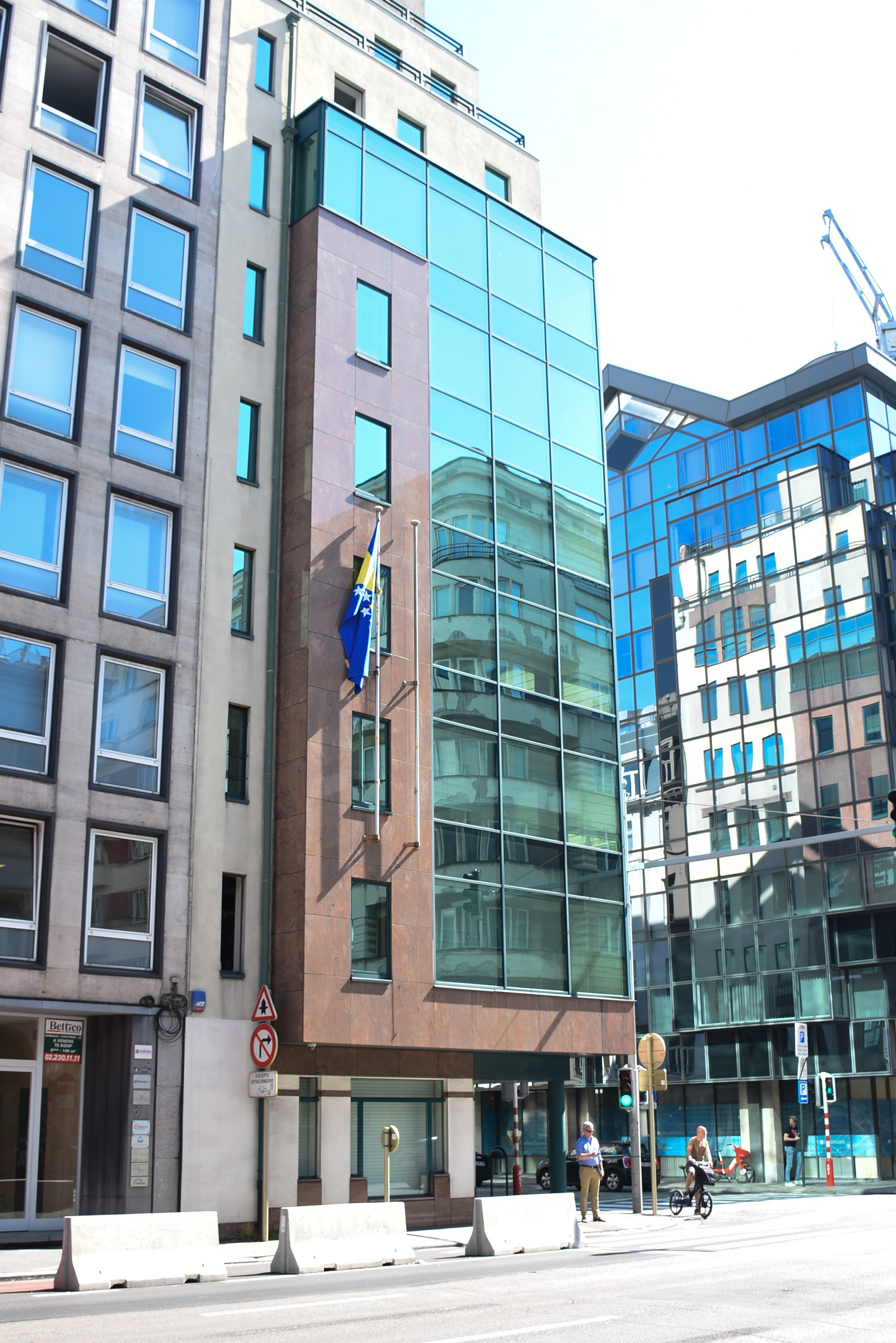
Embassy in Brussels

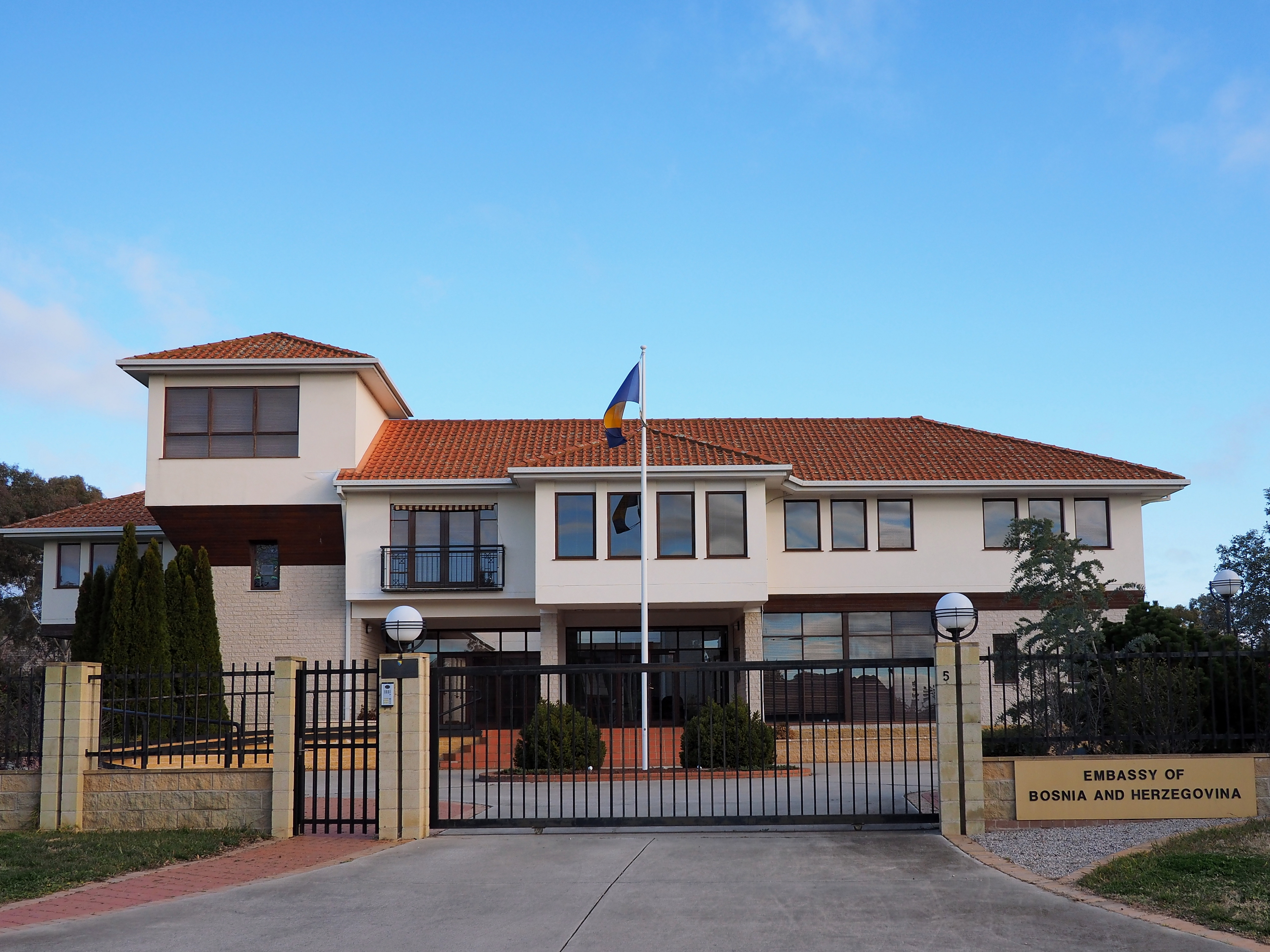
Embassy in Canberra

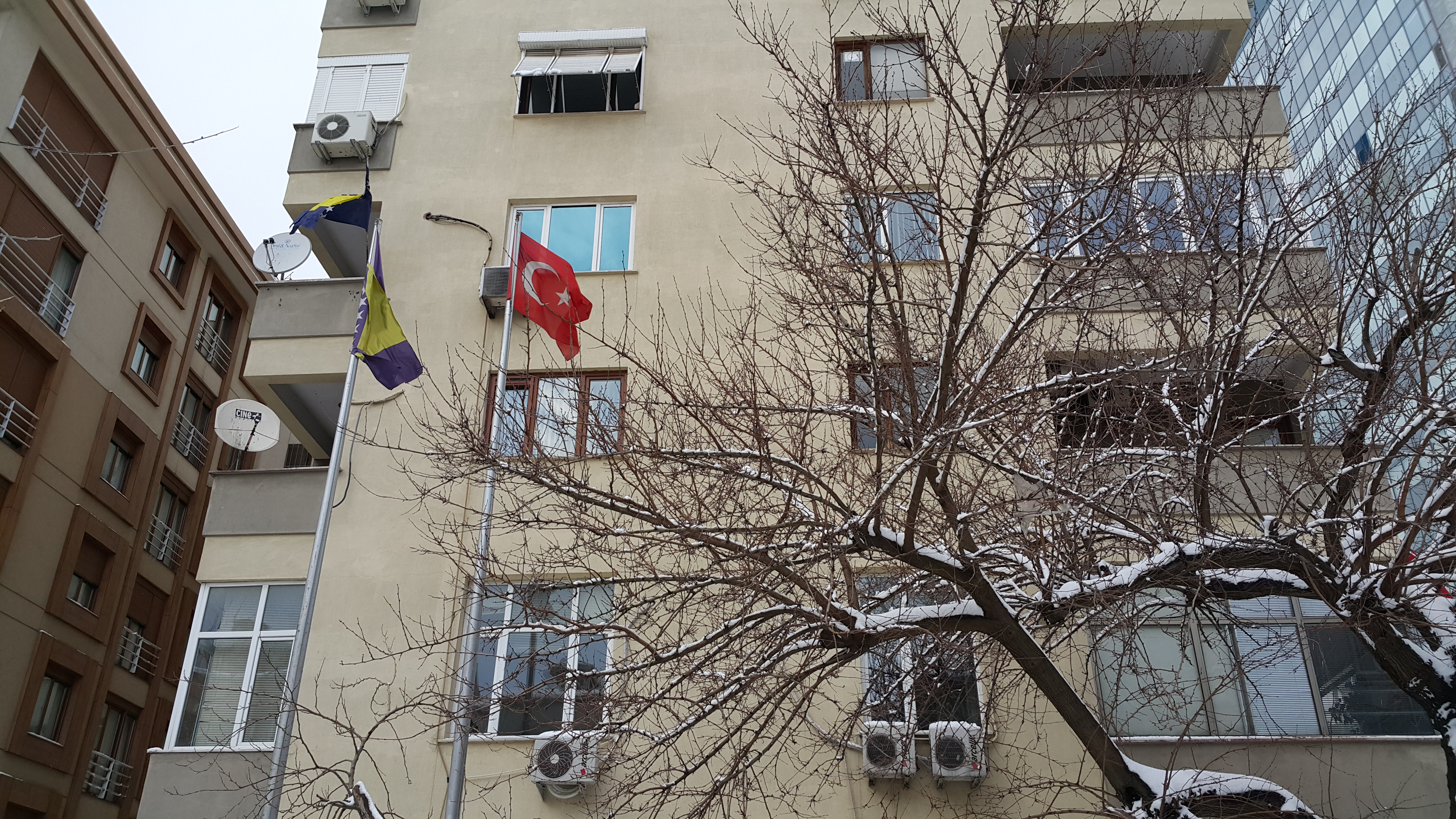
Consulate-General in Istanbul

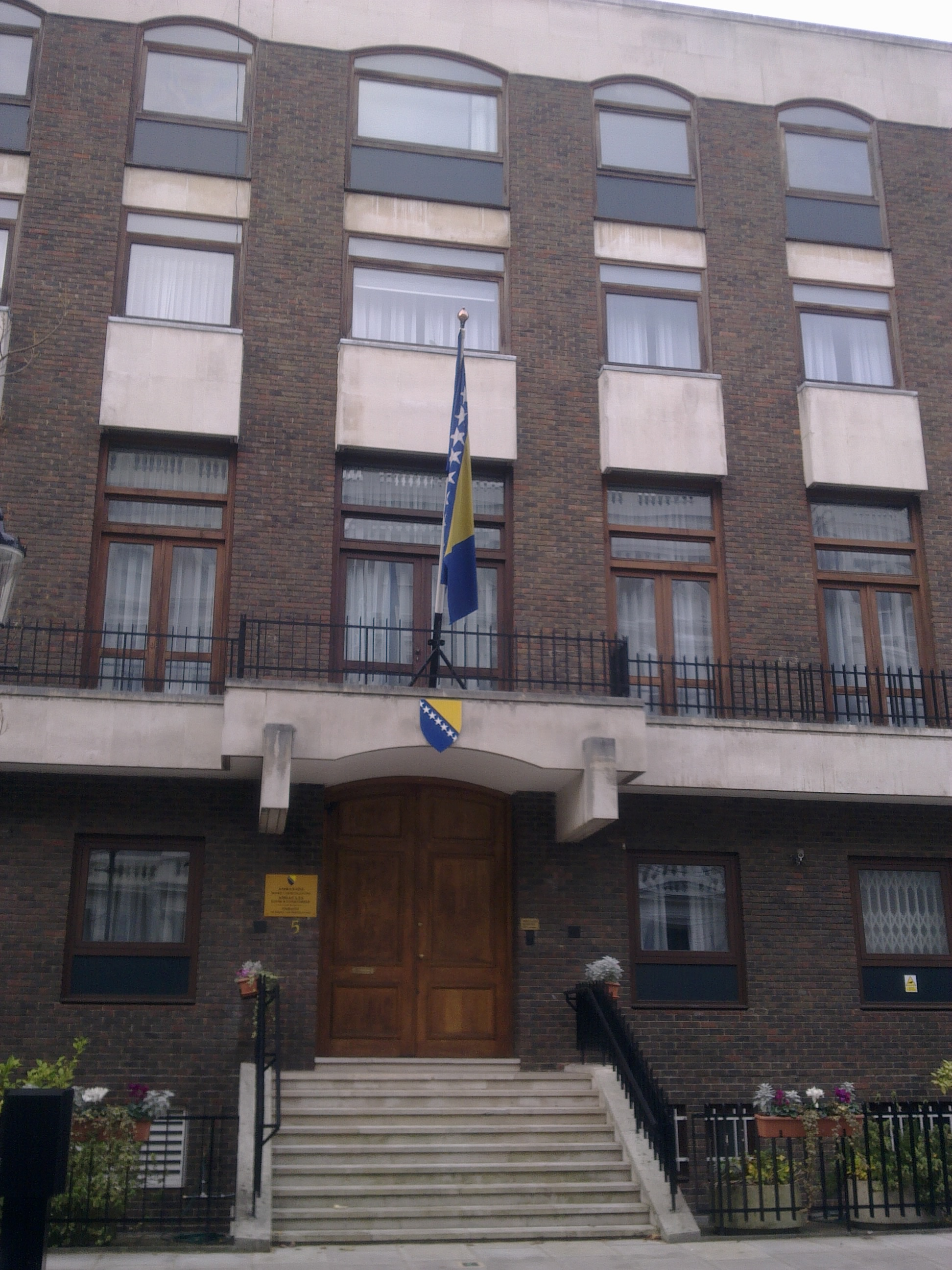
Embassy in London

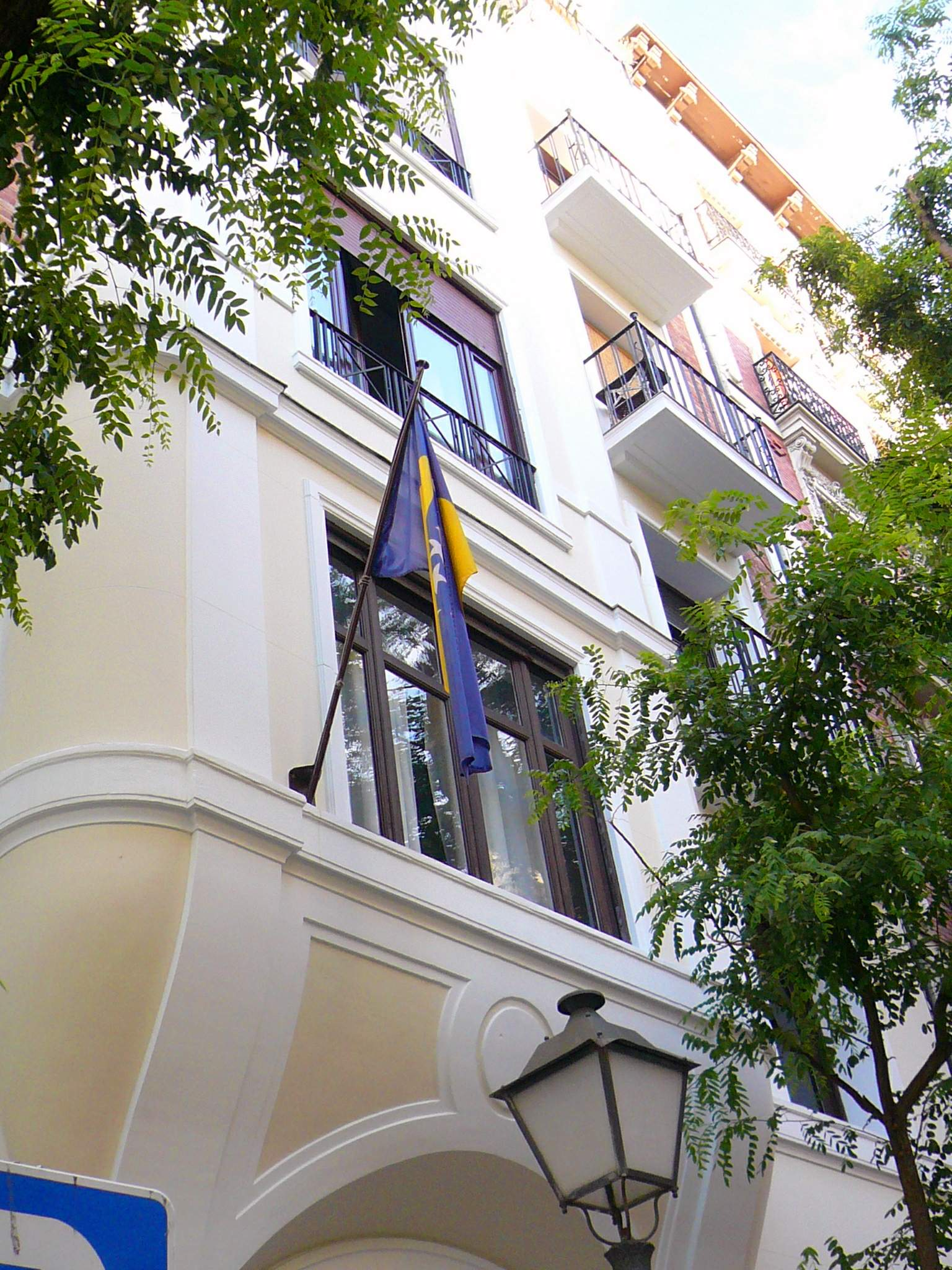
Embassy in Madrid

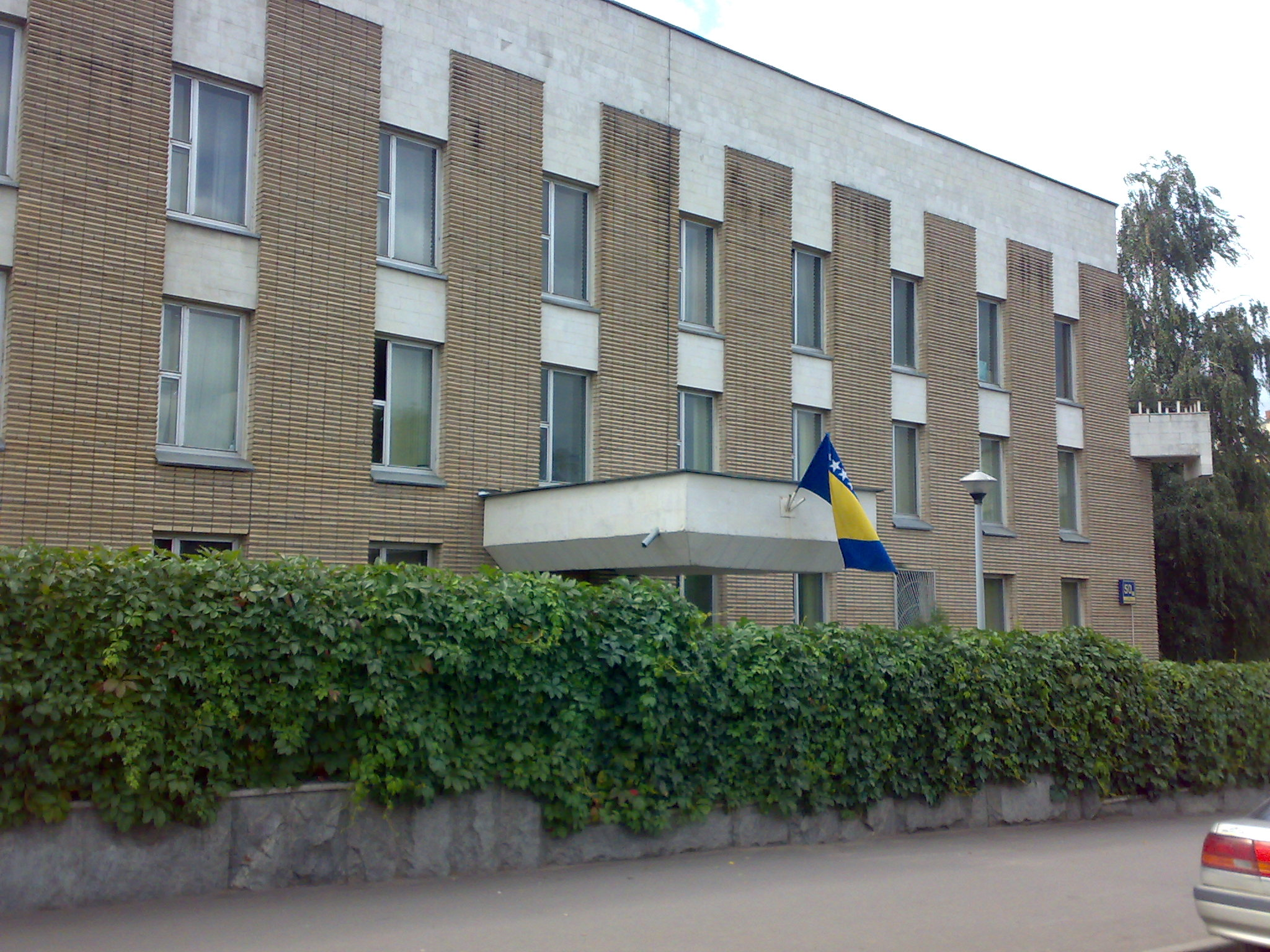
Embassy in Moscow

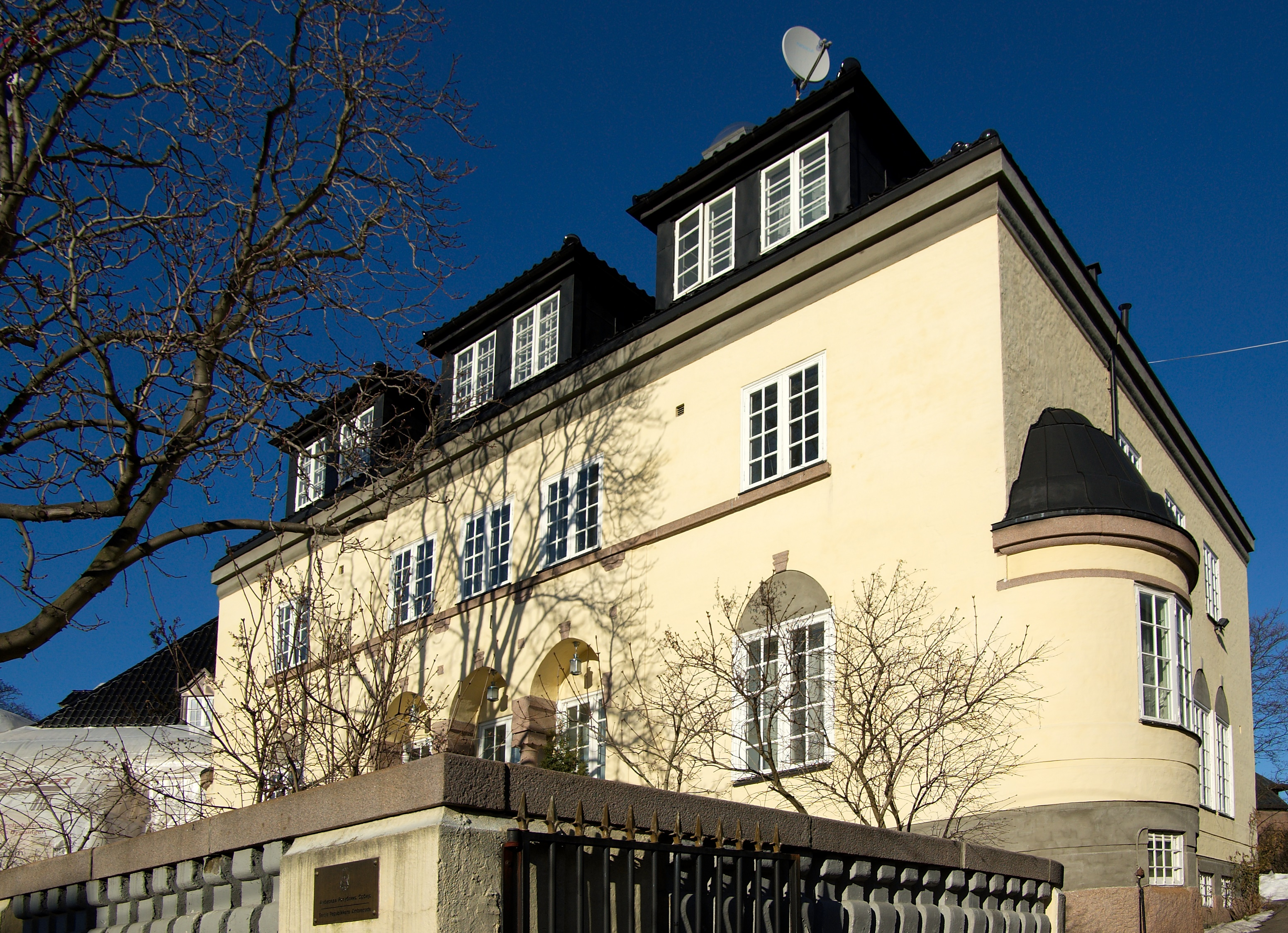
Embassy in Oslo

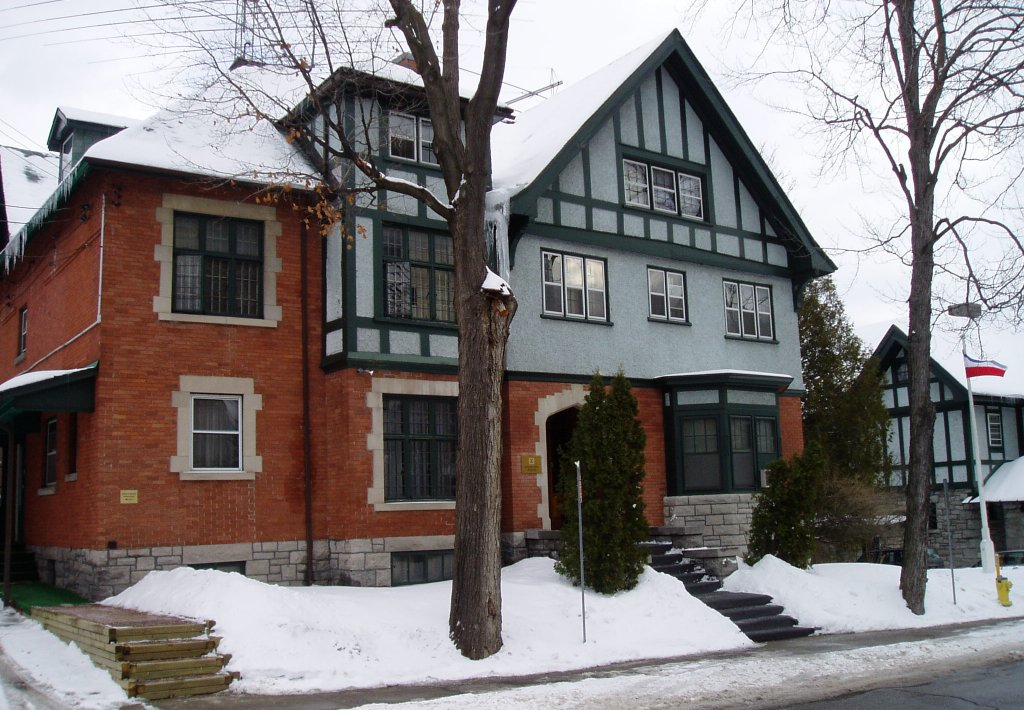
Embassy in Ottawa

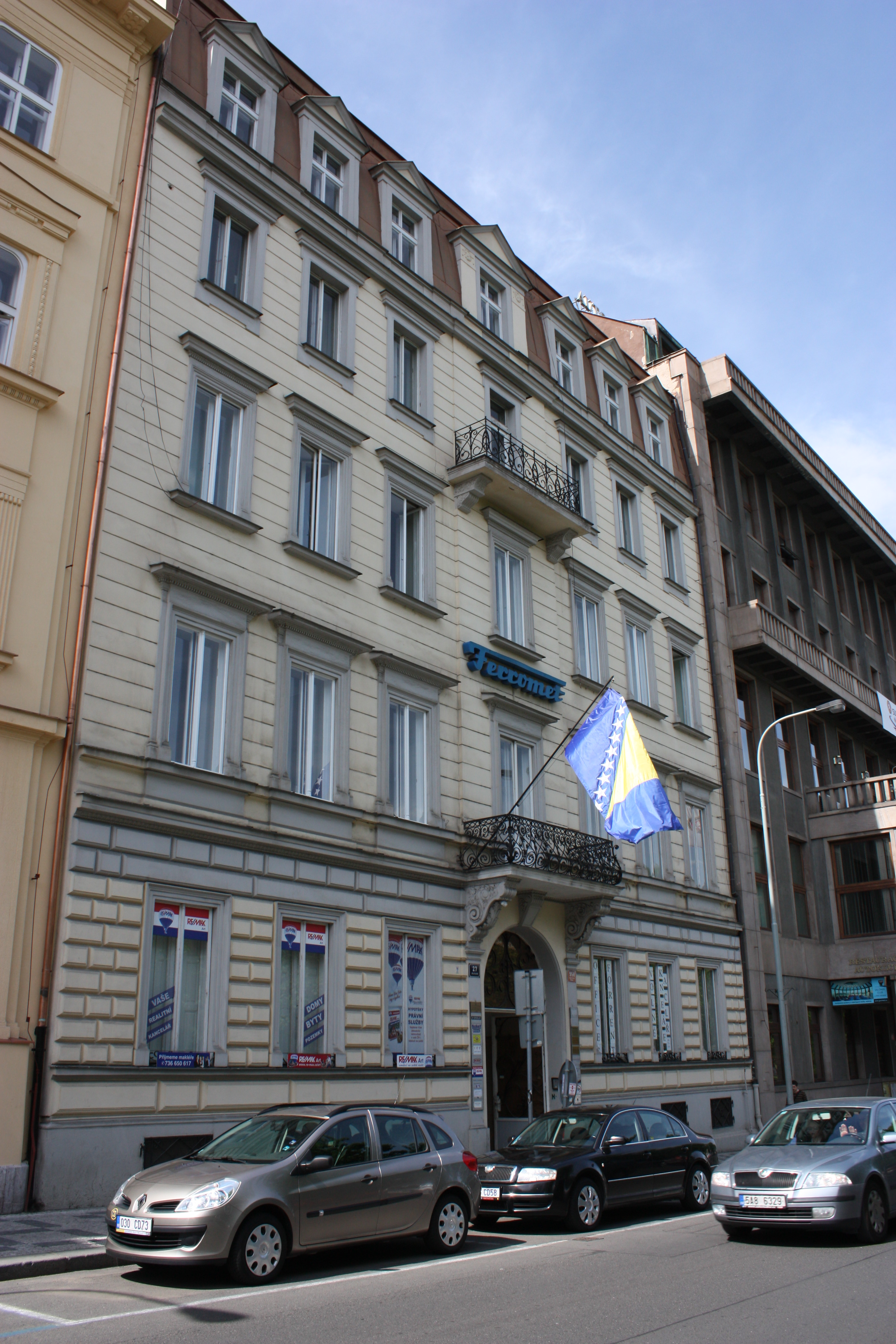
Embassy in Prague

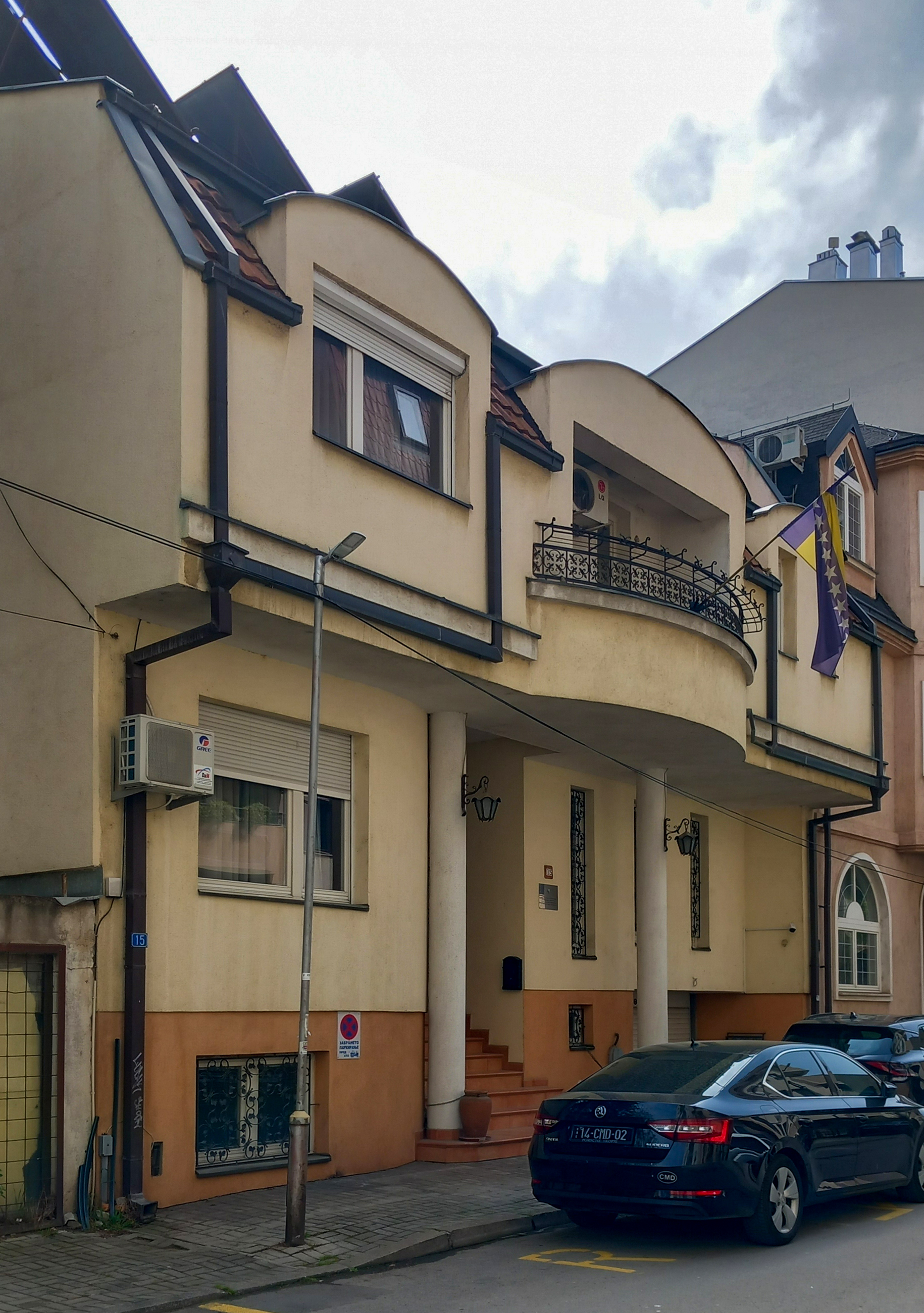
Embassy in Skopje

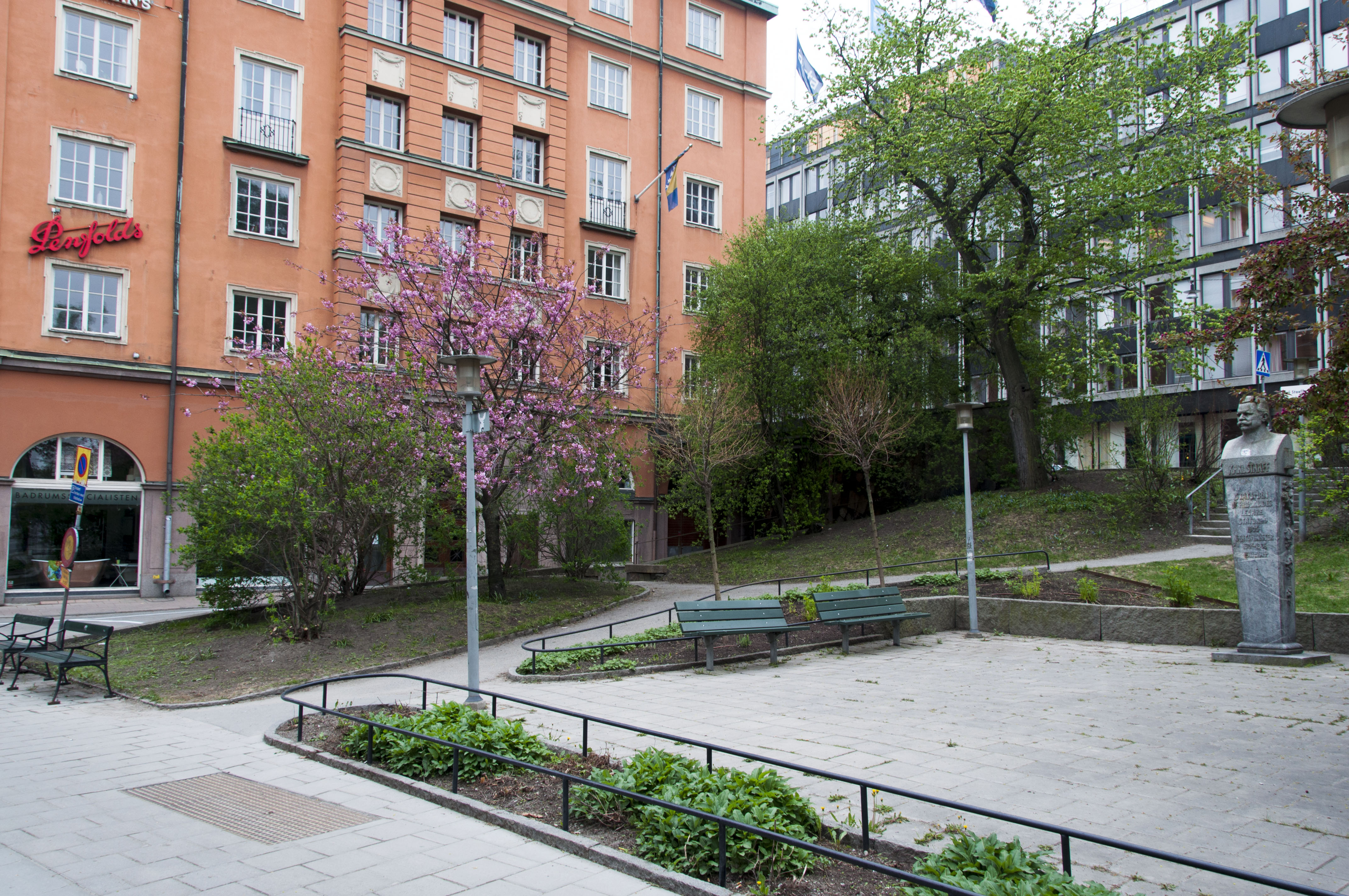
Embassy in Stockholm

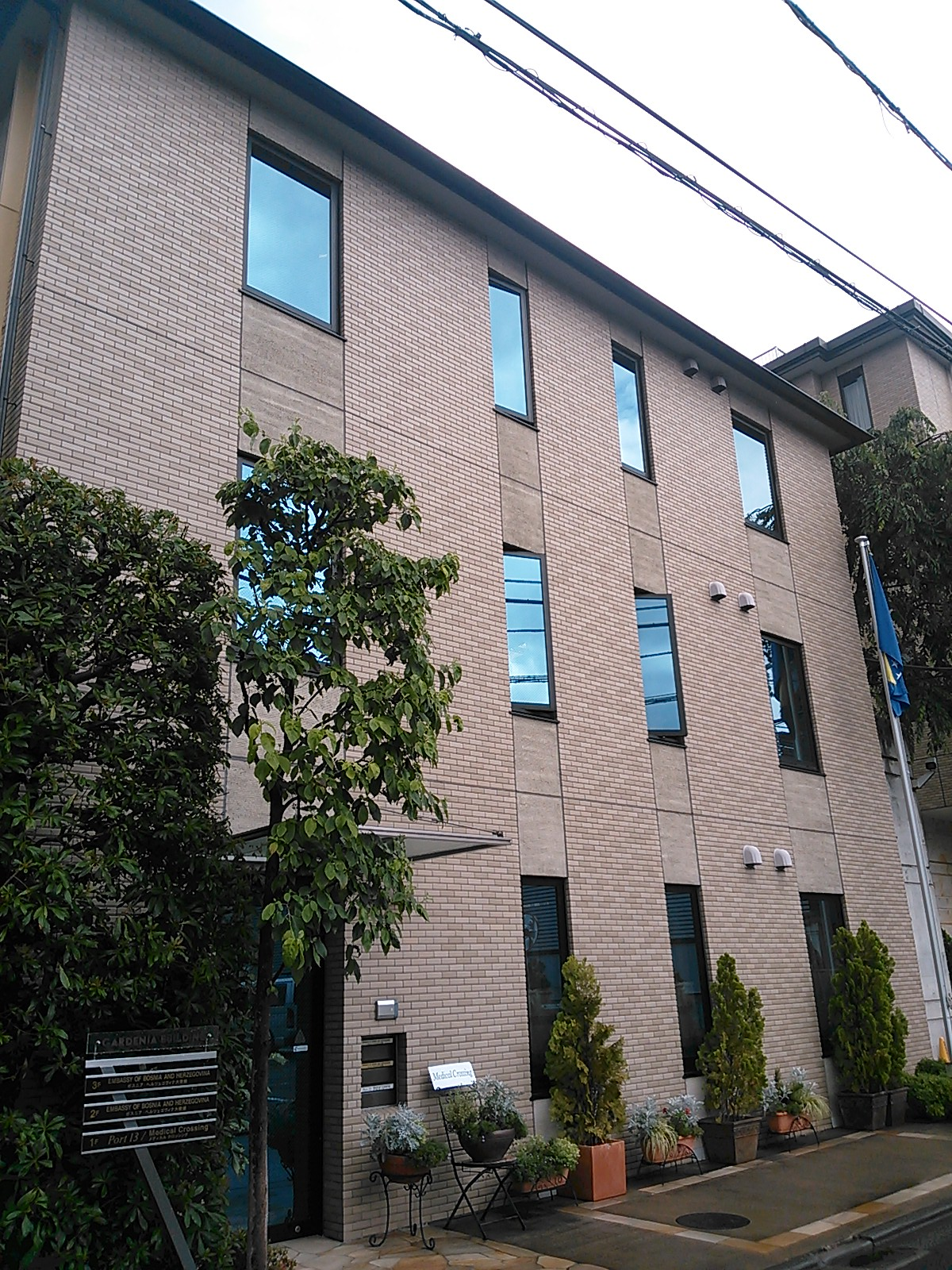
Embassy in Tokyo

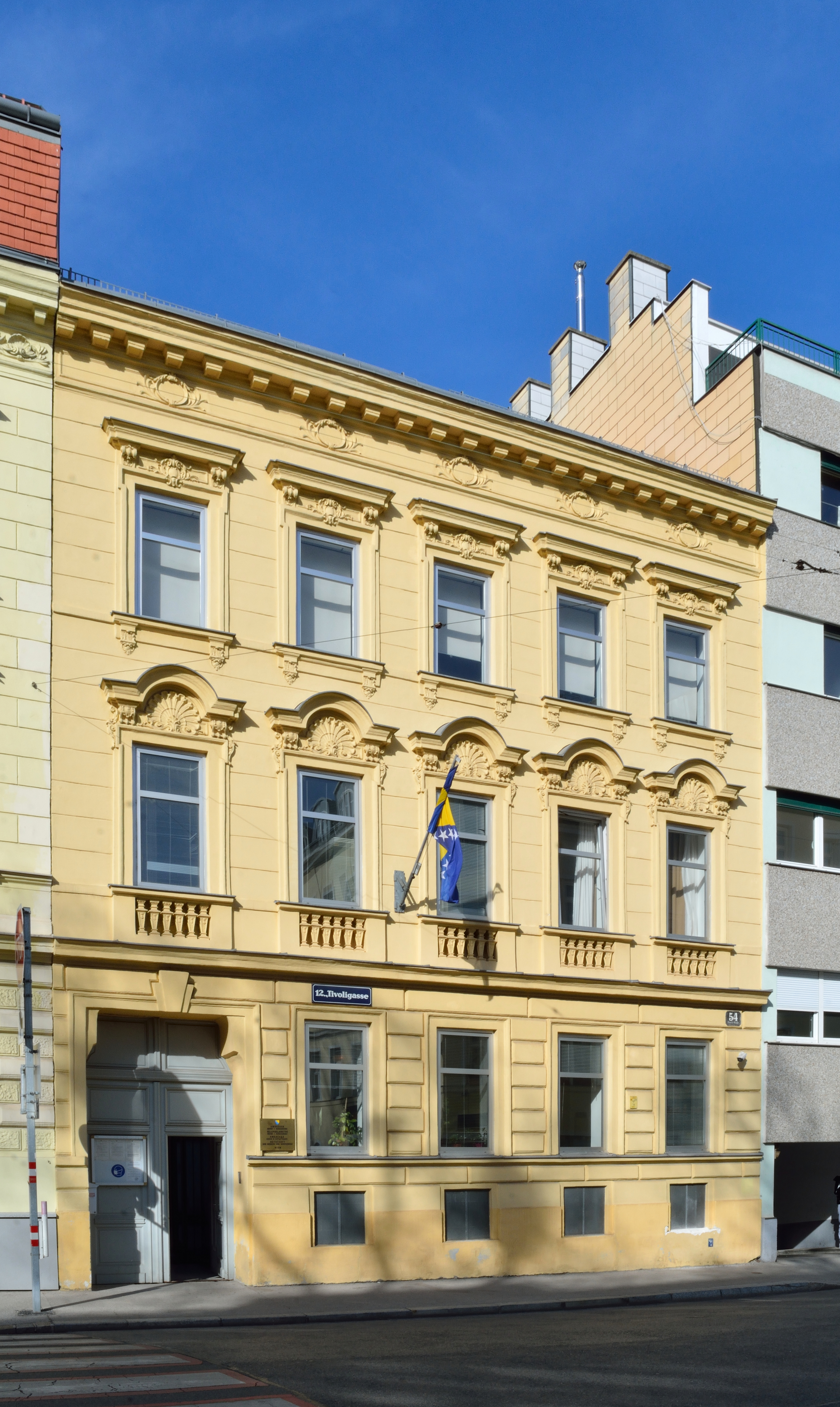
Embassy in Vienna

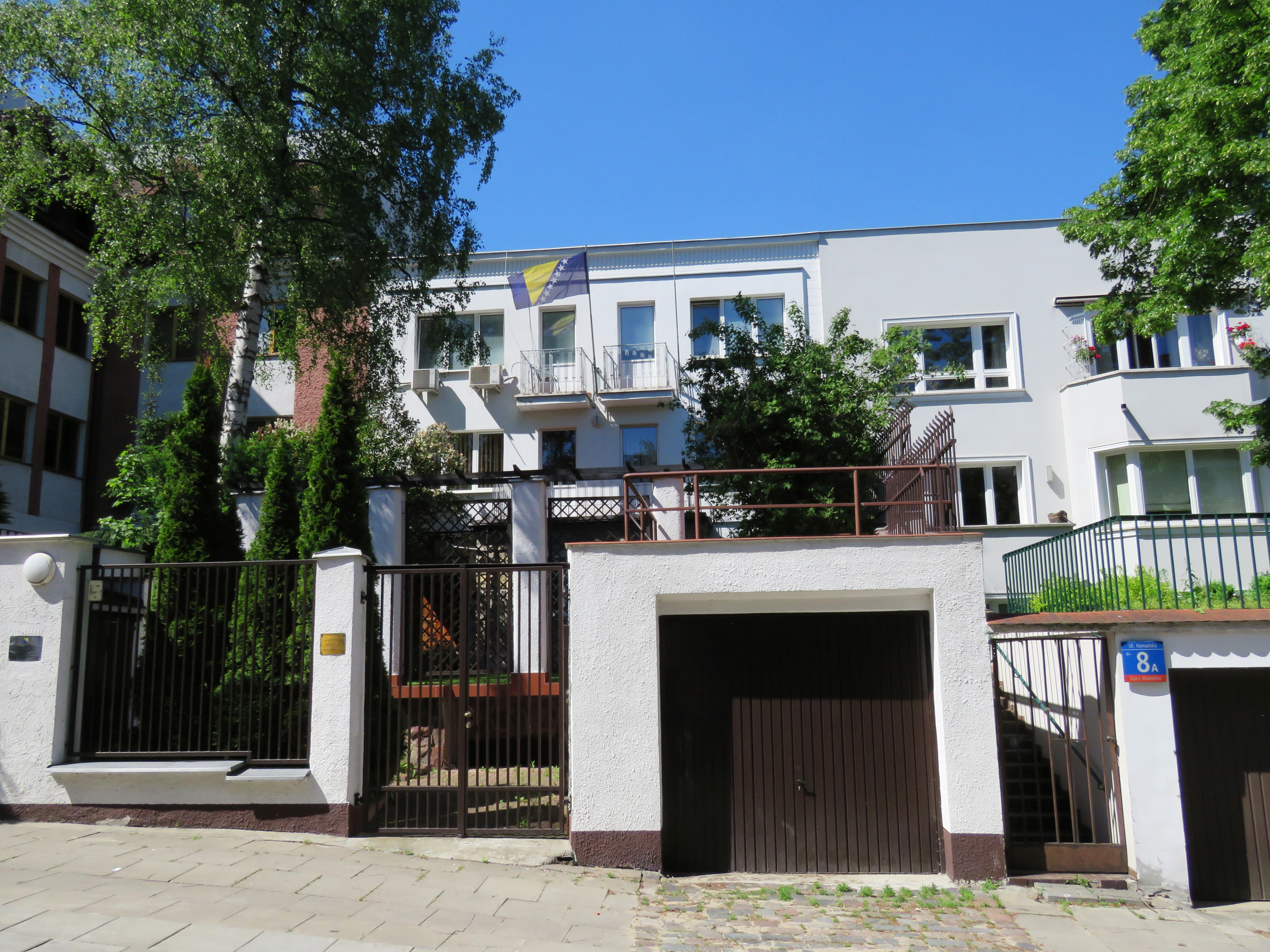
Embassy in Warsaw

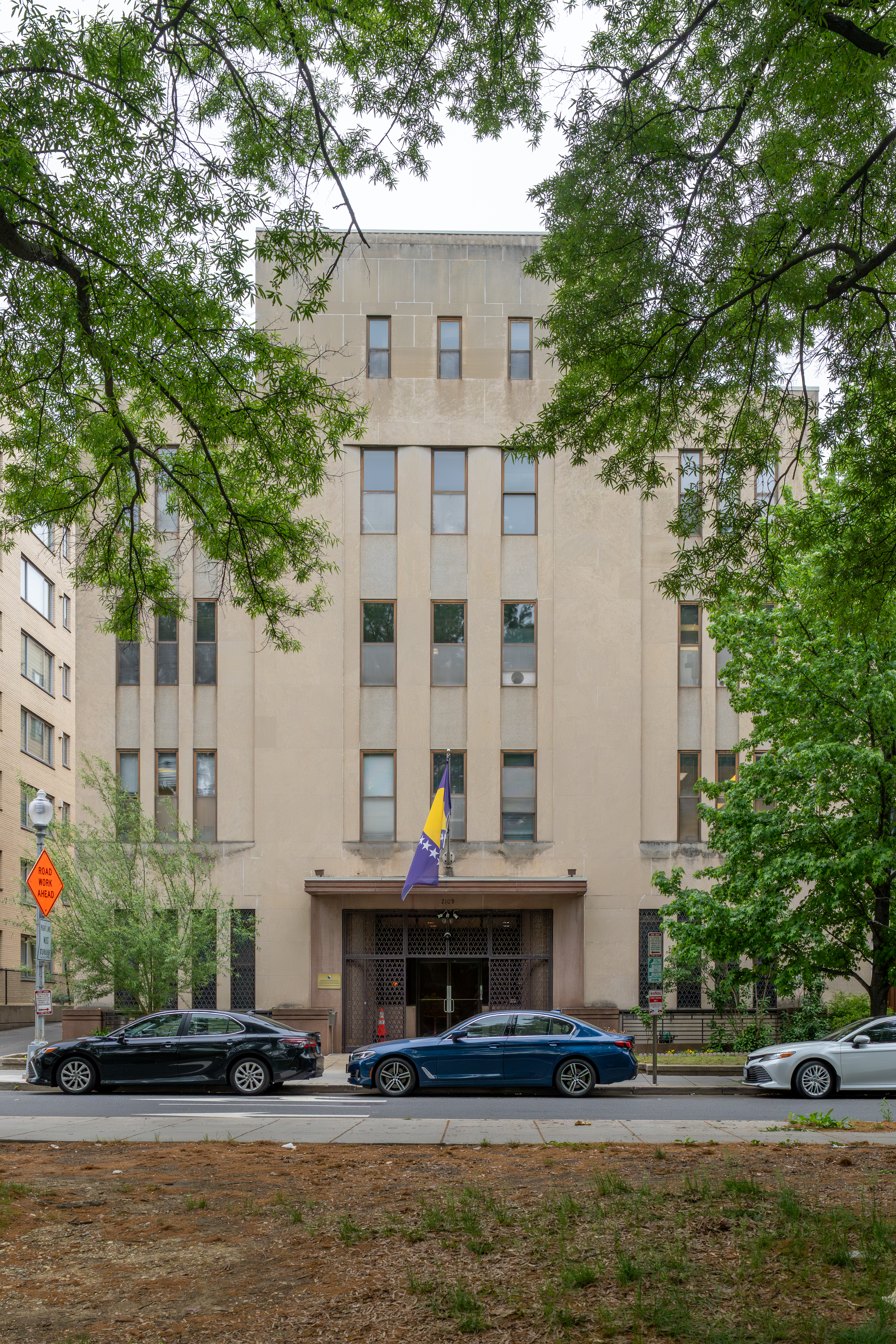
Embassy in Washington, D.C.

== Missions to open ==
Host country	Host city	Mission	Ref.
Algeria	Algiers	Embassy	
Azerbaijan	Baku	Embassy	
Brazil	Brasília	Embassy	
Kenya	Nairobi	Embassy	
Morocco	Rabat	Embassy	
Slovakia	Bratislava	Embassy	
Tunisia	Tunis	Embassy	

== Closed missions ==
Host country	Host city	Mission	Ref.
Argentina	Buenos Aires	Embassy	
South Africa	Pretoria	Embassy	

== See also ==
- Foreign relations of Bosnia and Herzegovina
- List of diplomatic missions in Bosnia and Herzegovina
