= Arnaut (given name) =

Arnaut is an Occitan masculine given name, cognate with English Arnold, Catalan Arnau, French Arnaud and Spanish Arnaldo. It may refer to:

- Arnaut Catalan (fl. 1219–1253), troubadour
- Arnaut de Cumenges (fl. 1218–1246), troubadour and soldier
- Arnaut Daniel (fl. 1180–1200), troubadour
- Arnaut Guilhem de Marsan (fl. 1160–1180), troubadour and viscount
- Arnaut de Mareuil (fl. late 12th century), troubadour
- Arnaut Plagues (fl. c. 1230–1245), troubadour
- Arnaut de Tintinhac (fl. 12th-century), troubadour
- Arnaut Vidal de Castelnou d'Ari (fl. 1305–1324), troubadour and author

== See also ==
- Arnaut (surname)
- Arnaut Osman, "Osman the Arnaut", hero of Serbian, Albanian, and Bosniak epic poetry
