= Eñaut =

Male given name

- Gender: Male
- Language: Basque

Origin
- Region of origin: Basque Country

Other names
- Related names: Arnaldo; Arnaud; Arnaut

Eñaut is a Basque masculine given name. It is the Basque version of the name Arnaldo.

== People ==
- Eñaut Elorrieta (born 1975), Spanish singer
- Eñaut Mendia (born 1999), Spanish footballer
- Eñaut Zubikarai (born 1984), Spanish footballer
