= Arnaldo =

Arnaldo is a given name. Notable people with the name include:

- Arnaldo Abrantes (born 1986), Portuguese track and field sprinter
- Arnaldo Alonso (born 1979), Paraguayan footballer
- Arnaldo André (born 1943), soap-opera Paraguayan actor
- Arnaldo Andreoli (1893–1952), Italian gymnast who competed in the 1920 Summer Olympics
- Arnaldo Maria Angelini (1909–1999), Italian scientist, working with Italy's power generation
- Arnaldo Antunes (born 1960), writer and composer from Brazil
- Arnaldo Baptista (born 1948), Brazilian rock musician and composer
- Arnaldo Villalba Benitez (born 1978), Paraguayan footballer
- Arnaldo Bonfanti (born 1978), footballer
- Arnaldo Carli (1901–1972), Italian racing cyclist and Olympic champion
- Arnaldo Cézar Coelho (born 1943), the first Brazilian to take charge of the FIFA World Cup final
- Arnaldo Cohen, Brazilian pianist
- Arnaldo da Silva (born 1964), former Brazilian athlete
- Arnaldo de Oliveira Sales, GBM, OBE, JP, Chairman of the Hong Kong Olympic Academy
- Arnaldo Deserti (born 1979), Italian water polo player
- Arnaldo Edi Lopes da Silva (born 1982), Portuguese footballer of Guinea-Bissauan descent
- Arnaldo Espínola (born 1975), Paraguayan footballer
- Arnaldo Faustini (1872–1944), Italian polar geographer, writer, and cartographer
- Arnaldo Ferraro (born 1936), former Republican Party politician from Brooklyn, New York
- Arnaldo Forlani (1925–2023), Italian politician and 44th Prime Minister of Italy
- Arnaldo Freire, Brazilian guitarist, teacher, cultural producer and composer
- Arnaldo Freitas (born 1952), Portuguese former footballer
- Mario Arnaldo Gómez (born 1981), Honduran footballer
- Arnaldo Jabor (born 1940), Brazilian film director, screenwriter and producer
- Arnaldo Ramos Lauzerique, Cuban independent economist
- Arnaldo Tamayo Méndez (born 1942), the first Cuban citizen to travel into earth orbit
- Arnaldo Mesa (born 1967), boxer from Cuba and Olympic silver medallist
- Arnaldo Momigliano KBE (1908–1987), Italian historian known for his work in historiography
- Arnaldo Ochoa (1930–1989), Cuban general executed after being found guilty of treason
- Arnaldo Otegi (born 1958), Basque politician, spokesman for the outlawed Abertzale Basque separatist party Batasuna
- Arnaldo Pambianco (born 1935), Italian road racing cyclist
- Arnaldo Pereira (born 1985), Paraguayan footballer
- Arnaldo Pérez (born 1958), butterfly and freestyle swimmer from Puerto Rico
- Arnaldo Pomodoro (1926–2025), Italian sculptor
- Javier Arnaldo Portillo (born 1981), Honduran football player
- Arnaldo Ouana (born 1969), Mozambique international football player
- Arnaldo Orfila Reynal (1897–1997), Argentine chemist and academic
- Arnaldo Ribeiro (1930–2009), Roman Catholic Archbishop in Ribeirão Preto, Brazil
- Arnaldo Darío Rosado (1953–1978), activist for the independence of Puerto Rico from a very young age
- Arnaldo Salvi (born 1915), Italian professional football player
- Arnaldo Santos, Puerto Rican reggaeton and rock producer, singer and guitarist
- Arnaldo Sentimenti (1914–1997), former Italian football player and coach
- Arnaldo Silva (born 1944), former Portuguese footballer who played as midfielder
- Arnaldo Villalba (born 1978), Paraguayan footballer
- Arnaldo (footballer, born 1894) (Arnaldo Patusca da Silveira, 1894–1980), Brazilian football forward
- Arnaldo (footballer, born 1947) (Arnaldo de Mattos), Brazilian Olympic footballer
- Arnaldo (footballer, born 1992) (Arnaldo Manoel de Almeida), Brazilian football right back

== See also ==
- ASPIRA Raúl Arnaldo Martinez Charter School, charter school in North Miami, FL
- Estádio Olímpico Regional Arnaldo Busatto, multi-use stadium in Cascavel, Brazil
