= Arnau =

Arnau may refer to:

== Places ==
- Arnau Church of St. Catherine of Alexandria, a medieval church in Arnau (modern Rodniki) east of Kaliningrad
- German name for Hostinné, a town in the Czech Republic
- University Hospital Arnau de Vilanova, a public medical institution in Lleida, Catalonia, Spain
- German name for Rodniki, Guryevsky District, Kaliningrad Oblast

== Given name ==
- Arnau, Catalan given name equivalent to Arnold
- Arnau Amalric (died 1225), Cistercian church leader who took a prominent role in the Albigensian Crusade
- Arnau Bassa (died 1348), Catalan painter of the 14th century
- Arnau Brugués-Davi (born 1985), professional tennis player from Spain
- Arnau Cadell (12th-century–13th-century), Catalan sculptor
- Arnau de Gurb, bishop of Barcelona from 1252 to 1284
- Arnau Mir, Count of Pallars Jussà (died 1174), the Count of Pallars Jussà from 1124/6 until his death
- Arnau Ramon of Pallars Jussà (died 1112), Count of Pallars Jussà from 1098 until his death
- Arnau March (fl. c. 1410–30), Provenço-Catalan knight and poet of the famous March family
- Arnau de Palomar, the first lord of Riudoms in Southern Catalonia near the current city of Reus
- Arnau of Peralta (died 1271), Bishop of Valencia 1243–1248, then Bishop of Zaragoza until his death
- Arnau Riera (born 1981), Spanish footballer
- Arnau Mir de Tost (died 1072), Catalan nobleman of Urgell, the lord of Llordà and viscount of Àger
- Arnau de Vilanova (1235–1311), alchemist, astrologer and physician

== Surname ==
- Ana Arnau (born 2005), Spanish rhythmic gymnast
- B. J. Arnau (1945–1989), American-born female singer and actor
- Comte Arnau, wealthy Catalan nobleman
- Emanuele Canoura Arnau (1887–1934), member of the Passionist Congregation and a martyr of the Asturias revolt
- Francesc Arnau (1975–2021), Catalan Spanish footballer
- Frank Arnau (1894–1976), pseudonym of a German crime fiction writer, born as Heinrich Schmitt
- Xavier Arnau (born 1973), former field hockey player from Catalonia, Spain
- Jordi Arnau (born 1970), former field hockey player from Catalonia, Spain
- Josep Arnau i Figuerola (1942–2025), Spanish politician
- Lucas Arnau (born 1979), awarded Shock Magazine's Best Colombian Pop Artist on September 21, 2007
- Narcís Jubany Arnau (1913–1996), Spanish Cardinal of the Roman Catholic Church
- Juan Arnau (born 1968), Valencian Spanish philosopher and essayist

== See also ==
- Anau (disambiguation)
- Arau
- Arna (disambiguation)
- Arnaud (disambiguation)
- Arnault
- Arnauts
- Arnold (disambiguation)
