= Marie Vermeulin =

French classical pianist (born 1983)

Marie Vermeulin (born 22 November 1983) is a French classical pianist.

== Biography ==
Born in Courcouronnes, Vermeulin began her piano studies with Jacqueline Dussol, then with Marie-Paule Siruguet at the Conservatoire à rayonnement régional de Boulogne-Billancourt, before continuing them from 2001 to 2004 at the Conservatoire national supérieur musique et danse de Lyon, where she was a student of Hortense Cartier-Bresson and Edson Elias. At the same time, she studied for four years with Lazar Berman in Florence, then at the Accademia Pianistica Internazionale Imola. She finally perfected her skills with Roger Muraro.

She won the first Grand Prize of the International Music Tournament in December 2004 (by vote of the Jury and the Public), the Second Grand Prize and Youngest Finalist Award at the Maria Canals International Music Competition in Barcelona in May 2006, and Second Grand Prize at the Olivier Messiaen Competition in December 2007. In November 2014 she won the Prix d'interprétation at the Simone and Cino Del Duca foundation awarded by the Académie des beaux-arts.

She has performed in many large venues as well in Paris (Cité de la musique, Petit Palais, Opéra Bastille, Auditorium of the Musée d'Orsay, Salle Cortot, Jardin des Serres d'Auteuil, Théâtre des Bouffes du Nord) as in other major French cities. She has also given numerous concerts abroad. She alternates solo piano recitals, chamber music, and concertos. She played notably under the baton of Pierre Boulez, Sir Paul Goodwin, Pavel Berman, Eric Geneste, Claire Levacher, Debora Waldman and Salvador Brotons. She is regularly involved in contemporary creation.

== Discography ==
- Olivier Messiaen: Vocalise-Étude for soprano and piano (Marie Vermeulin and Nathalie Manfrino), Universal, 2008
- Messiaen: Fantasy for violon and piano (Marie Vermeulin and Daniel Hope), Universal, 2008
- Messiaen's Préludes, Vingt Regards sur l'enfant-Jésus & Petites esquisses d'oiseaux (Marie Vermeulin), Paraty 612118, 2013
- Debussy's Pour le piano; Estampes; Études, Livres I et II (Marie Vermeulin), Collection Le Printemps des Arts de Monte-Carlo, 2016.
