= Arnaldo Freire =

Brazilian musician

Arnaldo Freire is a Brazilian guitarist, teacher, cultural producer and composer.

== Composition ==
Arnaldo Freire is an alumnus of Consevatório Musical Guarulhos and also studied at the Conservatory of Music and the Instituto Paulista Booklyn Souza. He is currently majoring in Composition course at the Federal University of Goiás – UFG. His composition "Apocalypse" for solo guitar was awarded by the Culture Secretariat of Goiânia.

The award-winning short film by Roxanne Towers, “Catadores de Papel ", has an original score by Arnaldo Freire.

Freire has also composed soundtracks: “Entre Memórias e Conquistas”, “Umas e Outras” and “Maria da Gruta” which were all directed by Lázaro Ribeiro.

In his compositions, there are Brazilian techniques mixed with refined approaches: modinhas, frevos, sambas, valsas and other colors are mixed with post-tonal techniques, refined counterpoints and unusual instrumentation.

The work of composition is quoted in Arnaldo Freire Guia de Música Contemporânea Brasileira, edited by CDMC – Brasil / Unicamp, a subsidiary of the Centre de documentation de la musique contemporaine, based on Cité de la Musique, Parc de la Villette, in Paris.

Achille Picchi, Eduardo Escalante, Estércio Marquez, Odemar Brígido, Neder Nassaro and Frederico Richter has written concertos especially for the guitarist.

He has worked with foreign composers such as Danielle Baas (Belgium), Harry Hewitt (USA), Naphtally Lahav (Israel), Carlos Carmona (Argentina), Paulo Galvão (Portugal) .

=== Catalog summary ===
The following is a brief catalog of works by Arnaldo Freire:

- OP. 01 – “RITUAL DA ALMA”, Prelude No. 01 for guitar.
- OP. 02 – “SAUDADE”, Prelude Nº02, for guitar.
- OP. 03 – “AR E MAR”, Prelude Nº03, for guitar.
- OP. 04 – “GLEISSON & LEYBER”, for 2 guitars.
- OP. 05 – “ENCONTRO DE RIOS”, Prelude Nº04, for guitar.
- OP. 06 – “CORREDEIRAS”, for 4 guitars.
- OP. 07 – “A BRUXA TIBETANA”, Prelude Nº05, for guitar.
- OP. 08 – “APOCALYPSE”, for guitar.
- OP. 09 – “O MONTE CINCO”, for string orchestra, inspired by the book by Paulo Coelho.
- OP. 10 – “SUÍTE EXPERIMENTAL”, quartet woods.
- OP. 11 – “IMPROVISO”, Prelude Nº06, for flute.
- OP. 12 – “SAÍDA PELA ESQUERDA”, country concertante for violin and cello.
- OP. 13 – “FUNK”, for flute.
- OP. 14 – “CONCERTO FESTIVO”, for guitar and orchestra.
- OP. 15 – “SUÍTE BRASILEIRA Nº01”, for flute and clarinet.
- OP. 16 – “FANTASIA CONCERTANTE”, for bass and piano.
- OP. 17 – “KALONI”, Prelude Nº07, for solo guitar.
- OP. 18 – “O LIVRO DE AMORES MODAIS”, for two voices, with poetry by Cristiano Siqueira.
- OP. 19 – “PROCISSÃO”, for oboe and strings.
- OP. 20 – “TRITONAL”, for 3 guitars.
- OP. 21 – “SUÍTE BRASILEIRA Nº2”, for piccolo and bass.
- OP. 22 – “A FLORESTA MÁGICA”, for bass and piano.
- OP. 23 – “PROSAS BÁRBARAS”, for symphony orchestra, based on the homonymous work by Eça de Queiroz.
- OP. 24 – “CAIXINHA DE MÚSICA”, for piano.
- OP. 25 – “SUÍTE BREVE”, for guitar.
- OP. 26 – “CANÇÕES SIMPLES”, for flute and guitar.
- OP. 27 – “BRIGA DE PÁSSAROS”, for guitar.
- OP. 28 – “O LIVRO DOS INSETOS”, for guitar.
- OP. 29 – “SUÍTE MÍSTICA” for flute.
- OP. 30 – “SUITE BRASILEIRA Nº3”, guitar quartet and wood.
- OP. 31 – “CONCERTINO”, for guitar, strings and percussion.
- OP. 32 – “O LIVRO DE SENTIMENTOS”, for 2 flutes.
- OP. 34 – “TRANSCENDÊNCIA” for mezzo-soprano and chamber orchestra, poetry Alexandra Machado
- OP. 35 – “SUÍTE”, for solo trumpet.
- OP. 36 – “O LIVRO DE VIAGENS Nº1”, for 2 basses.
- OP. 37 – “O LIVRO DE ADRIANA”, didactic series for solo bass (33 pieces).
- OP. 38 – “A HISTÓRIA DO CHORO”, for Flute and Guitar.
- OP. 39 – “CANTO”, for Soprano, Flute and Guitar. Song with poetry by Fernando Cruz.
- OP. 43 – “SUÌTE”, for Bassoon Solo.
- OP. 44 – “AS PAISAGENS QUE TROUXEMOS”, for soprano and string quartet, with the poetry of Fernando Cruz.
- OP. 45 – “SUÍTE PARA CLARINETA”.
- OP. 50 – “OS DOZE ESTUDOS”, for guitar.
- OP. 52 – “SUÍTE BRASILEIRA Nº4, for flute and string trio.
- OP. 54 – “SETE LEMBRANÇAS DE UM FLAUTIM”, for solo piccolo.
- OP. 58 – “CENAS BRASILEIRAS”, Duo for clarinet.
- OP. 59 – “PRELÚDIO, VALSA & FREVO”, for Oboe solo.
- OP. 67 – “CONCERTINO”, for trombone and strings.
- OP. 68 – “A FLORESTA DE BEATRIZ”, for harpsichord solo.
- OP. 70 – “O DERRADEIRO”, to band.
- OP. 72 – “Três Melodias Marianas”, for flute solo.

== Teaching ==
Arnaldo Freire's work as a teacher is very varied. He is the author of several methods for the guitar, and also teaches drums and bass.

Freire received honorable mention several times of the Municipal Sports, Culture and Recreation for his participation in the show “Violão e Violonistas Goianos”.

In 1996 Freire wrote and produced the video lesson “Ritmos” which has been alleged to set a new standard in guitar group lessons.

Having taught for fifteen years in Goiânia, Arnaldo Freire also founded choral and guitar classes in colleges: Marista, Dinâmico, Disciplina, Maria Betânia, Agostiniano, COC e Olimpo.

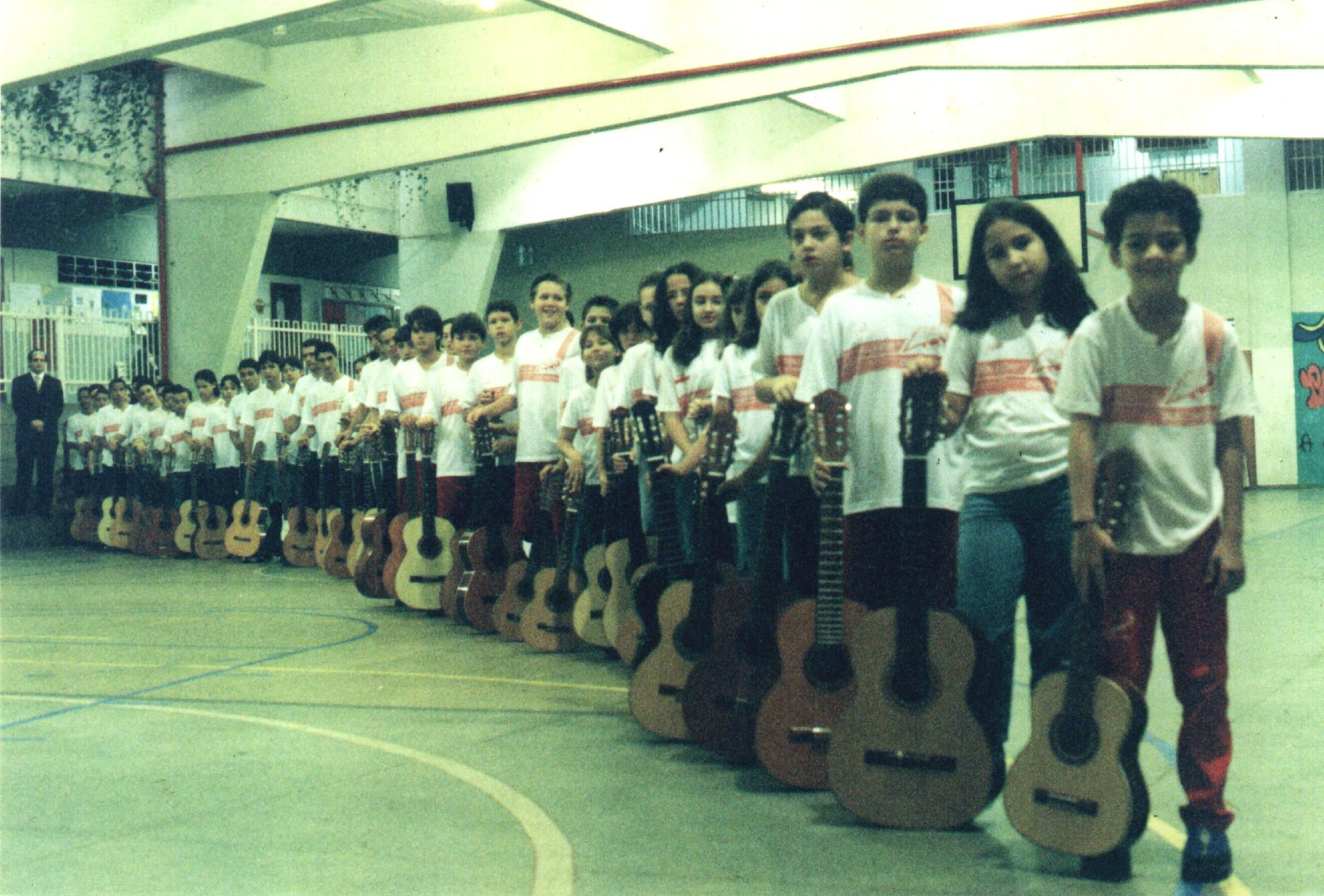

== Producing ==
As a cultural producer, Arnaldo Freire created the “Orquestra Planalto Central”, which was sponsored by the College Dinâmico. The composer Acchille Picchi wrote Pascha Nostrum specifically for it.

In 1999 Freire recorded “Cenas da Floresta” with the orchestra's woodwind quintet. In 2002 he launched a CD titled “O Violão em Goiás”.

He performed "Impressions: Oviedo" by Mary Ann Joyce in Brazil at the International Meeting of Women Composers.

== Playing ==
As a guitarist Arnaldo Freire received several awards including the National Guitar Competition at the Faculty Mozarteum ( 88 ) and the Competition Nacional de Violão Souza Lima ( 96 ).

In 1995 Arnaldo Freire was the first musician to perform concert for Guitar and Orchestra in Goiás, conducted by Joaquim Jayme by the Symphony Orchestra of Goiânia.

Your Show “A Volta ao Mundo em Seis Cordas” is the instrumental music show most presented in Goiás (since 1995).

=== Contributions to contemporary repertoire ===
- Achille Picchi (SP)
- Three Poetic Moments *
- Guitar & Symphony Orchestra
- Achille Picchi
- Three Parts
- Solo Guitar
- Achille Picchi
- Forest Scenes
- Wind Quintet
- Angélica Faria (RJ)
- The Three Faces of Love
- Flute, Guitar & Breakfast. Orchestra
- Calimério Soares (MG)
- Concertino
- Guitar, Brass & Percussion
- Fernando Lewis de Mattos (RS)
- Concert
- Guitar & Orchestra
- Estércio Márquez (GO)
- Concert Camera *
- Guitar & Breakfast. Orchestra
- Music for Flute and Guitar No. 1
- Music for Flute and Guitar No. 2
- Eduardo Escalante (SP)
- Concert *
- Guitar & Small Orchestra
- Concertante Nº3 **
- Flute, Guitar & Strings
- Frederico Richter (RS)
- Concerto No. 1 ***
- Guitar & Orchestra
- Concerto No. 2 ***
- Guitar & Orchestra
- Neder Nassaro (RJ)
- Concert
- Guitar & Strings
- Nestor de Holanda Cavalcanti (RJ)
- Three Folk Songs
- Guitar & String Quartet
- Odemar Brígido (RJ)
- Concert
- Guitar & Symphony Orchestra
- Pedro Cameron (SP)
- Concert
- Guitar & Strings
- Rodrigo Lima (SP)
- Variations
- Guitar & Strings
- Sérgio Vasconcelos-Corrêa (SP)
- Study No. 2
- Solo Guitar
- Wanderley Carlos Martins (SP)
- Quintet No. 1
- Wind Quintet

* – Presented by the Symphony Orchestra Goiânia.
** – Presented by the Orchestra of Ancient Cultural Foundation BH.
*** – Presented by the Symphony Orchestra Santa Maria – RS
