= Arnaout =

Arnaout is a surname derived from the ethnonym. Notable people with the name include:

- Abbas Arnaout (born 1944), Jordanian director and writer
- Abdul Qader Arnaout (1928–2004), Islamic scholar of Albanian origin
- Adel Arnaout (born 1970), Lebanese-Canadian immigrant who was convicted of sending three letter bombs
- Enaam Arnaout (born 1962), Syrian-American prisoner and detainee of the United States federal government
- M. Amin Arnaout, Lebanese-American physician-scientist and nephrologist
- Omar Arnaout (born 2000), Romanian singer
