= Danka Savić =

Bosnia and Herzegovina ambassador to Austria

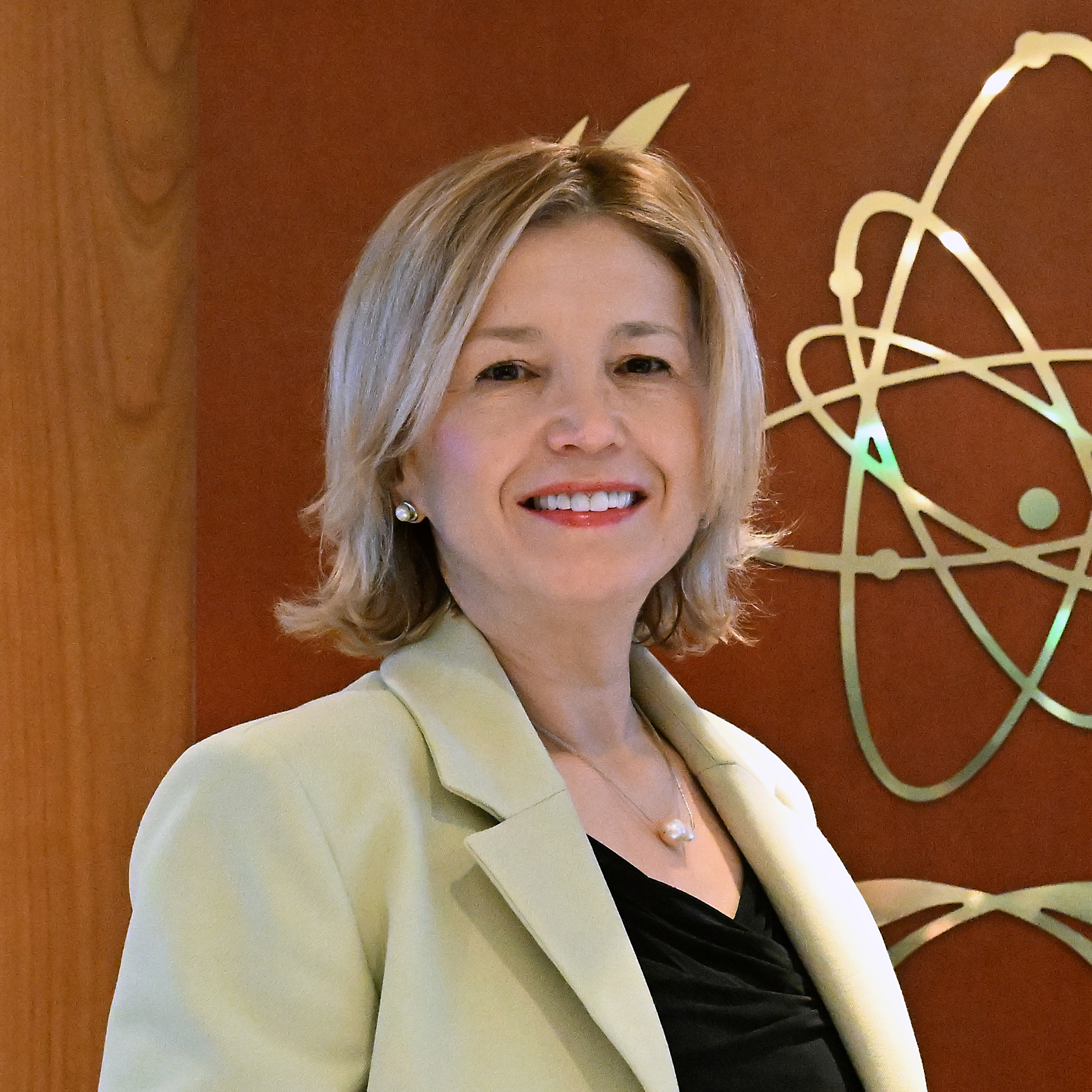
- Savić in 2024 at the IAEA
- Education: University of Sarajevo, University of Bologna
- Occupations: journalist, diplomat
- Known for: Ambassador

Danka Savić is a Bosnian diplomat and the current ambassador to Vienna. She was a journalist before she became an ambassador to Spain, the Czech Republic and Slovakia.

== Life ==
She studied at the University of Sarajevo obtaining a first degree in journalism. Her master's degree in European studies was accredited by the same university and the Italian University of Bologna.

For over twenty years she was a journalist before she decided to became a diplomat. She worked for the weekly magazine Slobodna Bosna before she was appointed to be a resident ambassador in 2013 to the Czech Republic and she was also a non-resident ambassador to Slovakia until 2016. She then worked to achieve European integration for her country and also for the ministry of foreign affairs.

She was appointed to represent her country in Spain in 2019. The headquarters of the International Olive Council is in Madrid and during her time in Spain she progressed her country's application to becoming a member. She also furthered the agreements necessary for her county's driving licences to be accepted in Spain. Spain was hoping to bid for the 2030 Winter Olympics and as part of that the bobsled could return to a rebuilt track in Sarajevo which Barcelona would fund.

She was moved from Spain to Vienna where she is the ambassador both to Austria and to the international organisations who have their headquarters in the city. This included the Organization for Security and Co-operation in Europe in October 2023 and the United Nations and her accreditation was accepted in 2024.
