= Arnaldo Alonso =

Paraguayan footballer (born 1979)

Personal information
- Date of birth: 18 December 1979 (age 46)
- Place of birth: Asunción, Paraguay
- Position: Forward

Senior career*
Years	Team	Apps	(Gls)
2004	Sport Colombia	31	(6)
2005	12 de Octubre	34	(10)
200506	Universitario	6	(2)
2006	Olimpia	13	(1)
2007	Sol de América	9	(0)
2007–2009	Deportivo Pasto	28	(6)
2009–2010	San Martín de San Juan	9	(0)
2010	Deportivo Español	11	(0)
Total		149	(25)
Medal record
Second place	Torneo Clausura	2006
Second place	Copa Colombia	2009
- * Club domestic league appearances and goals

Arnaldo Alonso (born 18 December 1979) is a Paraguayan footballer who played for clubs including San Martín de San Juan of the Primera B Nacional in Argentina.
