= ASPIRA Raúl Arnaldo Martinez Charter School =

ASPIRA Raul Arnaldo Martinez Charter School

Location
- North Miami, Florida; United States; 25.8977490°N 80.194398°W

Information
- Type: Public
- Established: 1998
- School district: Miami-Dade County Public Schools
- Grades: 6-8
- Campus: Suburban
- Colors: Navy Blue & White
- Mascot: Ram

ASPIRA Raúl Arnaldo Martinez Charter School (formerly ASPIRA Youth Leadership Charter School) is a charter school in North Miami, Florida for grade levels six through eight. The school opened in 1999.

== History ==
Its original facilities were built in 1998, and ASPIRA opened in 1999. "ASPIRA" is Spanish for "aspire," and most of the school's students are Latino.

An official dedication ceremony held in March, 2000, featured Puerto-Rican-born actor Jimmy Smits. The L.A. Law and NYPD Blue star recounted how he benefited as a child from a scholarship for Puerto Rican students and urged more positive portrayals of Latinos in popular culture. He cut the ceremonial ribbon with a cry of "Viva la educación!"

== Name changing ==
To honour the memory of the former President of ASPIRA of Florida, Raúl Martinez, the school name was officially changed by the governing board to ASPIRA Raúl Arnaldo Martinez Charter School.
