= Arnaldo Freitas =

Portuguese footballer (born 1952)

Personal information
- Full name: Arnaldo Gonçalves Freitas
- Date of birth: 6 August 1952 (age 74)
- Place of birth: Portugal
- Position: Defender

Youth career
- 1967–1974: Sp. Madeira

Senior career*
Years	Team	Apps	(Gls)
1974–1978	Marítimo		
1978–1979	Montijo		
1979–1980	Académico Viseu	33	(0)
1980–1982	Nacional	48	(0)
1982–1985	Amora	61	(1)
1986	Toronto First Portuguese		
- * Club domestic league appearances and goals

Arnaldo Freitas (born August 6, 1952) is a Portuguese former footballer who played as a defender.

== Career ==
Arnaldo played at the youth level with Sp. Madeira in 1967. In 1974, he played in the Segunda Divisão with C.S. Marítimo, and assisted in securing promotion to the Primeira Divisão in 1977. In 1978, he returned to the Segunda Divisão to play with C.D. Montijo, and later with Académico Viseu, and C.D. Nacional. In 1982, he returned to the Primeira Divisão to play with Amora F.C. and played three seasons with the club. In 1986, he played abroad in the National Soccer League with Toronto First Portuguese.
