= Anau =

Anau may refer to:

- Anau, Bora Bora, commune in Bora Bora
- Anau, Turkmenistan, city in Turkmenistan
