= Josep Arnau i Figuerola =

Spanish politician (1942–2025)

Member of the Congress of Deputies for Girona
- In office 16 March 1979 – 31 August 1982

Personal details
- Born: 25 August 1942 Girona, Spain
- Died: 17 April 2025 (aged 82)
- Party: UCD
- Education: University of Girona; Polytechnic University of Catalonia
- Occupation: Engineer

Josep Arnau i Figuerola (25 August 1942 – 17 April 2025) was a Spanish politician. A member of the Democratic Union of Catalonia, he served in the Congress of Deputies from 1979 to 1982.

Arnau died on 17 April 2025, at the age of 82.
