= Arnaut de Cumenges =

Arnaut de Cumenges (fl. 1218–1246) was a Gascon nobleman, the brother of Count Bernard IV of Comminges. He took part in the war against Albigensian Crusade, participating in the defence of Toulouse in 1218. He was also a troubadour, who wrote a sirventes beginning Be·m plai us usatges. He was still living in 1246.

== Works ==
- Be·m plai us usatges ("I'm pleased by usages that run"), translated by James H. Donaldson (2003)
