= Axia Marinescu =

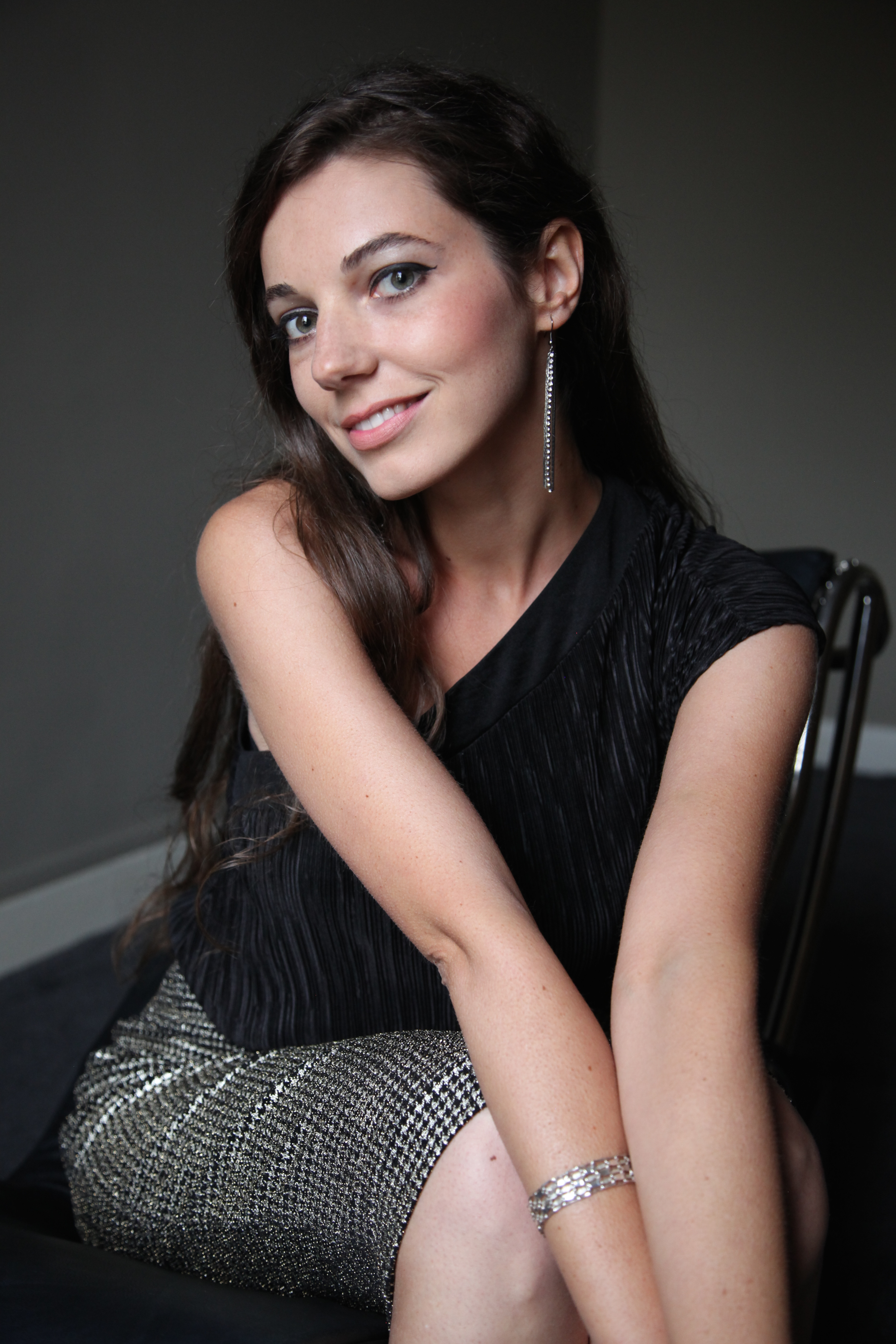
The pianist before concert

Axia Marinescu (born 1987 Bucharest, Romania) is a French-Romanian concert pianist. She is currently living in Paris.

== Biography ==
Born in Bucharest, Marinescu began studying piano at the age of 6 in her native Romania and made her debut with the Romanian National Radio Orchestra at the age of 11. Marinescu is an award winner at international piano competitions in Italy, France, Greece and Romania. After graduating at the age of 17 from the Bucharest Conservatory, where she also completed music theory, harmony, counterpoint and composition studies, Marinescu continued her education at the Lausanne Conservatory, the École Normale de Musique de Paris and the Royal Conservatory of Bruxelles. Marinescu received the guidance of Jacques Rouvier, Paul Badura-Skoda, Jean-Claude Vanden Eynden and Rena Shereshevskaya.

== Career ==
Marinescu started performing in public at the age of 6. She moved to Paris in 2009 and initiated a solo career during her studies. Marinescu performed solo and with orchestra in various venues in Europe (Paris, Toulouse, Bordeaux, Munich, Stuttgart, Palermo, Athens, Bucharest ...) and Asia (Shanghai Oriental Art Center, Nanjing Poly Grand Theater and others). She has been invited to play at international piano festivals: Piano aux Jacobins, Piano en Valois, L’esprit du piano, Palermo Classica.

Her repertory includes works going from Bach and Rameau to contemporary composers. In 2012, she performed a piece by Claude Ledoux. She has also collaborated with Romain Zante, Dan Dediu and performs first-auditions of their works.

Marinescu gives masterclasses in Europe and Asia

== Recordings ==
In September 2018, Marinescu launched her new CD Introspections under the French label Polymnie. The CD features master-pieces by Mozart: Piano Sonata no.11, KV 331, Brahms: 6 Pieces for Piano op.118 and Debussy: Images, 1st Book.

Marinescu's newest album Les femmes dansent is dedicated to French dance music which was written by women composers from 1600 until today. The CD ranked in the top 10 of the classical 2021 releases on the streaming platforms.

== Philosophy ==
Marinescu is a Philosophy graduate of the Paris University. Her article “La vocation de l’art en dialogue avec la théologie apophatique” was published in 2011. Marinescu is a TED speaker.

== Distinctions ==
Marinescu was appointed a Knight of the Cultural Merit by the President of Romania.
