= Christian Bonfanti =

Italian former road racing cyclist (born 1981)

Cristian Bonfanti
Personal information
- Full name: Cristian Bonfanti
- Born: 30 November 1981 (age 44) Bergamo, Italy

Cycling career
- Sport: Cycling
- Discipline: Road
- Role: Rider

Professional teams
- 2003: De Nardi–Colpack (stagiaire)
- 2005: Domina Vacanze
- 2006: Team 3C Casalinghi Jet–Androni Giocattoli

Cristian Bonfanti (born 30 November 1981) is an Italian former road racing cyclist. He rode for Domina Vacanze in 2005 and Team 3C Casalinghi Jet–Androni Giocattoli in 2006, after appearing as a stagiaire with De Nardi–Colpack in 2003.

== Career ==
Bonfanti was born in Bergamo. Before turning professional, he rode for U.C. Bergamasca and was a stagiaire with De Nardi–Colpack in 2003. Tuttobiciweb lists him as a professional from 1 January 2005, riding for Domina Vacanze in 2005 and Team Androni Giocattoli in 2006.

In 2005, Bonfanti finished sixth in the Giro di Romagna, which was won by Danilo Napolitano ahead of Daniele Bennati and Graeme Brown.

Ahead of the 2006 season, Tuttobiciweb reported that Team Androni Giocattoli–3C Casalinghi had moved up to Professional Continental level and that Bonfanti had joined the team from Domina Vacanze. He was included in the team's line-up for its first race of the 2006 season, the Gran Premio della Costa Etruschi.

== Major results ==
2005

- 6th Giro di Romagna
