= Claire Levacher =

French orchestral conductor

Claire Levacher is a French orchestral conductor.

== Career ==
Levacher won three first prizes at the Conservatoire de Paris (CNSMDP) and a Master's degree in conducting at the University of Michigan and then advanced her skills at the Vienna Musikhochschule with Leopold Hager. She won the International Conducting Competition in Treviso (Italy) and the second prize at the International Conducting Competition in Prague in 2000.

From 2001 to 2011, she was musical director of the CNSMDP's Laureates Orchestra (Orchestre des Lauréats) and professor of conducting at the CNSMDP. She was regularly invited to conduct the various CNSMDP orchestras and prepare them for conductors such as Pierre Boulez, Kurt Masur, Christoph Eschenbach, Myung-Whun Chung.

She was invited to lead orchestras in France (Orchestre national d'Île-de-France, Orchestre de Région de Bayonne-Côte Basque, Orchestre des Pays de Savoie, Orchestre symphonique d'Orléans, Opéra national du Rhin), in the Czech Republic (Prague Radio Symphony Orchestra, Prague Academy Orchestra, Severočeská filharmonie of Teplice), in Hungary (Franz Liszt Academy of Music in Budapest), in Italy (Filarmonia Veneta Orchestra) and in Austria (in Vienna and at the Bregenzer Festspiele). She is also regularly invited to conduct the Lebanese National Orchestra and various national orchestras in South America.

In the opera field, she has been assistant conductor at the Opéra de Nice, the Théâtre des Champs-Élysées, and the Opéra de Lyon. She has been musical director of various opera productions, including the Prague State Opera.

Since October 2020, she is professor of orchestral education at the University of Graz (Kunstuniversität Graz) in Austria.

She is a Knight of the French award Ordre des Arts et des Lettres.
