= Arturo Bonfanti =

Italian painter (1905–1978)

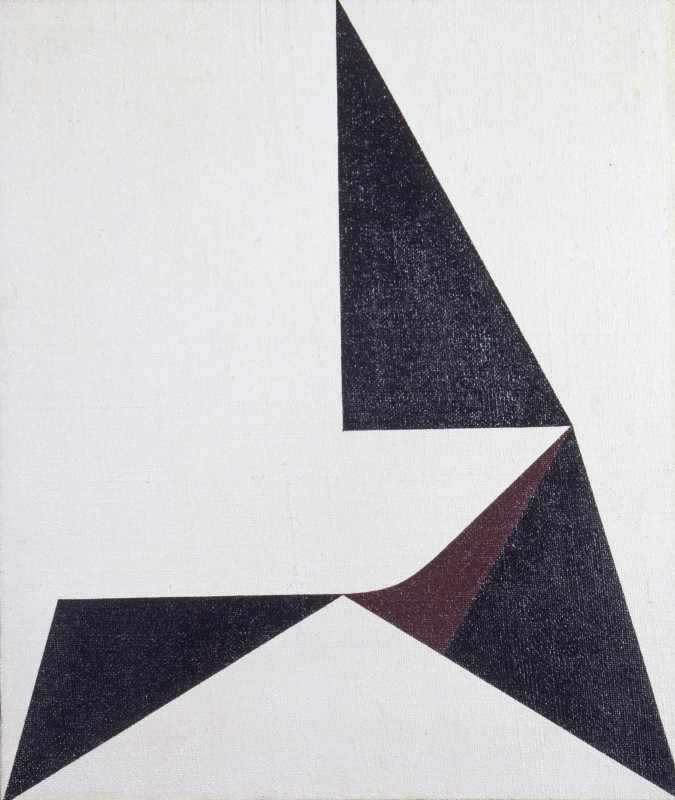
Struttura 184 T, 1964 (Art collections of Fondazione Cariplo)

Arturo Bonfanti (24 May, 1905 – 21 January, 1978) was an Italian painter born in Bergamo.

== Biography ==
Having studied at the Andrea Fantoni art school in Bergamo since 1924, Bonfanti moved to Milan in 1926 and devoted his energies to graphic art and interior decoration. It was in the 1930s that he developed relations with the group of abstract artists gravitating around the Galleria del Milione in Milan. He was also influenced by the Metaphysical art of Carlo Carrà and L’Esprit nouveau of Amédée Ozenfant and Le Corbusier. His return to Bergamo during World War II was followed in the post-war period by various trips to Paris, Zurich and Munich. In 1947 he started to produce abstract paintings, aiming for the geometric simplification of forms. Unlike many artists of that period, he did not join a specific artistic movement, and his creativity was not confined by medium. In 1954, he won an award at the Cannes Film Festival for his film La chiave di Calandrino. During the 34th Venice Biennale in 1968 the Italy pavilion devoted a room exclusively to his artworks. Bonfanti participated in the controversial São Paulo Art Biennial of 1969, which was the subject of an international boycott. He represented Italy in a group exhibition with Mario Radice, Ferruccio Bortoluzzi, Giovanni Korompay, Lucio Saffaro, Piero Rambaudi, and Giuliano Vangi.

In 2012, a Catalogue raisonné of Bonfanti's work was published by Mondadori Electa with texts by Luca Massimo Barbero.

== Other projects ==
Media related to Arturo Bonfanti at Wikimedia Commons
