= Abbas Arnaout =

Jordanian director and writer

- Born: 23 October 1944 (age 81)
- Occupations: Festival director, documentary film director

Abbas Arnaout (Arabic: عباس أرناؤوط) (born 23 October 1944) is a Jordanian director and writer, most known recently for being the founder and festival director of the Aljazeera International Documentary Film Festival, as well as his documentary film making career.

Abbas Arnaout studied film direction in the United Kingdom, and specialized in directing drama and television documentaries. Arnaout was the managing director of the Jordanian Television (now known as JRTV), but left in 1975 to work in Dubai TV. He directed several television series during his time at Dubai TV.

He also directed several documentary films, most of which are politically themed, documenting the recent history of the Arab-Israeli conflict. One of his prominent documentaries is Al Khiam, which chronicles and portrays the nature of the Khiam detention center by the Israeli forces prior to their withdrawal from south Lebanon.

In 1996, Abbas Arnaout moved to work at Al Jazeera, and, in 2004, founded the Aljazeera International Documentary Film Festival. He currently is the director of the festival.
