= Arnaut Osman =

Arnaut Osman (English: Osman the Arnaut) is a hero of Serbian, Albanian, and Bosniak epic poetry. The Serbo-Croatian language poems about Arnaut Osman include "Young Marjan and Arnaut Osman", "Sekula and Arnaut Osman" and "Mujo Hrnjica kills Simun Brehulja". Albanian language poems about Arnaut Osman include "Sirotan Alia and Arnaut Osman".

== Epic poetry on Serbo-Croatian language ==
The poem "Young Marjan and Arnaut Osman" (Serbian: Млади Марјан и Арнаут Осман / Mladi Marjan i Arnaut Osman) was recorded by Vuk Karadžić (Narodne srpske pjesme III, Leipzig, 1823), based on the singing of Anđelko Vuković from Kosovo (from whose singing Karadžić recorded four poems in total). The main motif of this poem is brotherhood and conciliation.

Another song recorded by Vuk Karadžić (also in 1823) is titled "Sekula and Arnaut Osman".

The poem "Mujo Hrnjica Kills Simun Brehulja" (Bosnian: Mujo Hrnjica pogubi Simuna Brehulju) testifies that Arnaut Osman was one of famous bayraktars in the epic poetry of Bosniaks. In this poem, Christian hero Simun Brehulja inflicted deadly wounds to Arnaut Osman and killed chetniks under his command.

Some singers of this poem referred to Osman as Captain Osman instead of Arnaut Osman. Some variants of this song are titled "Mujo Hrnjica Liberates His Blood-Brother Arnaut Osman" (Bosnian: Mujo Hrnjica izbavlja svog pobra Arnaut Osmana).

Arnaut Osman is one of the heroes of the novel Elizabeth, the Montenegrin Queen (Serbian: Јелисавета, кнегиња црногорска / Jelisaveta, kneginja crnogorska), written by Đura Jakšić in 1868.

== Epic poetry on Albanian language ==
Arnaut Osman is also a hero of the Albanian epic poetry. He is one of main characters in the song "Sirotan Alia and Arnaut Osman" (Albanian: Siran Tin Alia dhe Arnaut Osmani) Albanian epic poetry had also recorded a poem almost identical to a poem about Mali Radojica, although the poem renames Mali Radojica to Arnaut Osman.
