= Arnaldo Bonfanti =

Italian footballer (born 1978)

Personal information
- Date of birth: 18 March 1978 (age 48)
- Place of birth: Monza, Italy
- Height: 1.81 m (5 ft 11 in)
- Position: Defender

Team information
- Current team: ITALIANTEAM

Senior career*
Years	Team	Apps	(Gls)
1995–1999	Atalanta	1	(0)
1997–1999	→ Alzano Virescit (loan)	41	(1)
1999–2000	Reggiana	7	(0)
2000	→ Castel di Sangro (loan)	13	(4)
2000–2001	Castel di Sangro	37	(5)
2001–2002	Fermana	26	(0)
2002–2003	Alzano Virescit	26	(1)
2003–2004	Fermana	15	(0)
2004–2005	Chieti	45	(0)
2005–2007	Novara	43	(1)
2007–2008	Lecco	16	(0)
2008–2009	Sambenedettese	27	(0)
2009–2010	Pergocrema	10	(0)
2010–2011	Colognese	31	(2)
2011–	MapelloBonate		
- * Club domestic league appearances and goals as of 15:18, 3 May 2010 (UTC)

Arnaldo Bonfanti (born 18 March 1978) is a former Italian footballer.

He played 1 game in the Serie A for Atalanta B.C. in the 1996/97 season. In 1999, he was sold to Reggiana in co-ownership deal. His son Nicholas, born on 1 January 2002, plays as a striker for Inter Milan youth team.
