= Damir Arnaut =

Damir Arnaut (born 5 May 1975) is a Bosnian politician, diplomat, and lawyer, currently serving as the Ambassador of Bosnia and Herzegovina to Germany since 2023.

Previously, he served as member of the House of Representatives of Bosnia and Herzegovina as a member of the Union for a Better Future (SBB BiH) from 2014 to 2019, and later as member of Our Party until 2022. He briefly served as member of House of Representatives of the Federation of Bosnia and Herzegovina from 2022 to 2023, having won over 8000 votes, equaling more than 40 percent of the party result.

== Early life and education ==
Arnaut was born in Sarajevo, where he completed elementary school and began attending the Fifth Gymnasium. In 1992, at the start of the Bosnian War, he emigrated to the United States. He completed his secondary education at Santa Barbara High School in 1993. Arnaut then earned a Bachelor's and Master's degree, followed by a Juris Doctor (J.D.) from the University of California, Berkeley, graduating in 2002.

During his studies, he completed a legal internship at the New York law firm Coudert Brothers in 2001. He subsequently worked as an attorney in the Office of Legal Counsel at the U.S. State Department until 2006 and later at the law firm White and Case until 2007.

== Career ==
Upon returning to Bosnia and Herzegovina in 2007, Arnaut served as an advisor on constitutional and legal affairs in the Cabinet of then-member of the Presidency of Bosnia and Herzegovina, Haris Silajdžić.

In 2010, he was appointed Ambassador to Australia and New Zealand. After completing his diplomatic mandate, he returned to Bosnia and Herzegovina and joined the political party Union for a Better Future (SBB BiH). In 2014, he briefly served as an advisor at the Ministry of Security, and later that year at the 2014 election was elected to the House of Representatives of Bosnia and Herzegovina. Four years later, he secured a compensatory mandate in the same institution and also served as a member of the Parliamentary Assembly of the Council of Europe.

In December 2019, Arnaut resigned from all party positions due to his opposition to SBB BiH joining a coalition with the Party of Democratic Action (SDA) and Democratic Front (DF). He subsequently left the party and joined Our Party, with which he won a seat in the House of Representatives of the Federation of Bosnia and Herzegovina in the 2022 election. In 2023, he was appointed Ambassador of Bosnia and Herzegovina to Germany.

== Private life ==
Arnaut has two children: a son, Borna (born 2008), and a daughter, Lara (born 2015).
