= Centre de documentation de la musique contemporaine =

French music association

The Centre de documentation de la musique contemporaine (Cdmc) is a French association based in Paris. Founded in 1977, it is an important resource centre for contemporary music.

== Introduction ==
The Centre is a public documentation centre for contemporary music in Paris, founded in 1977. Since 1993, it has been located not far from the Cité de la musique, place de la Fontaine-aux-Lions, Parc de la Villette, in the 19th arrondissement of Paris.

A resource centre, in addition to its musical fonds, it puts composers in touch with performers and creators on the occasion of various projects, participates in the dissemination of musical works to programmers, and offers a season of meetings, symposia and study days.

== History ==
The origins of the Centre date back to 1976, at the initiative of Jean Maheu, then Director of Music at the French Ministry of Culture : a commission of musical and institutional personalities decides on actions to promote contemporary music and to help composers and music publishers interested in this repertoire. Two entities are thus imagined: le Centre de documentation de la musique contemporaine (Cdmc) and Musique française d'aujourd'hui (MFA) For its activities, the Cdmc receives support from the SACEM et de Radio France.

Officially created in 1977, the Centre was inaugurated in February 1978 and opened to the public a few months later with a documentary catalogue of 500 works.

In 2007, the Cdmc is coordinating, in partnership with the IRCAM, the Conservatoire de Paris, the Cité de la musique, the Médiathèque Musicale Mahler and the Ensemble intercontemporain, the setting up of a portal dedicated to contemporary music.

The director of the Centre from the outset, Marianne Lyon, remains in office until 2007. Laure Marcel-Berlioz succeeds her at the head of the establishment, then Agnès Prétrel from 2019.

In 2020, the Centre merges with two other associations: Musique française d'aujourd'hui and Musique nouvelle en liberté, to integrate a new structure: the Maison de la musique contemporaine (MMC).

== Backgrounds and catalogue ==
The documentation is kept at the Centre twenty years after the death of a composer, then the collection is returned to the BnF.

In 2000, 11000 works were available for consultation. In 2020, the catalogue of the Centre de documentation de la musique contemporaine included more than 1100 composers and nearly 20,000 works, some of which are accessible online in the form of excerpts.

There are 40,000 documents available at the Cmdc, are of various kinds.

- published and unpublished scores,
- sound documents (including 30 years of recordings Ina / Radio France),
- music videos,
- books, periodicals, dissertations and theses,
- documentary files on the works,
- biographical files on the composers,
- archives of concert programmes and festivals in France.

As for the contemporary music portal, as of July 2020, it claims access to 400,000 records and 14,000 audio excerpts online, and the database contains nearly 10,000 names or structures.
