= Arnault =

Arnault may refer to:

== People ==
- Antoine-Vincent Arnault (1766–1834), French dramatist and poet
- Bernard Arnault (born 1949), French businessman
  - Antoine Arnault (born 1977), his son, a French businessman
  - Delphine Arnault (born 1975), his daughter, a French businesswoman
  - Frédéric Arnault (born 1995), his son, a French businessman
  - Hélène Mercier-Arnault (born 1960), his wife, a Canadian pianist
- Jean Arnault (born 1951), French diplomat
- Jean-Claude Arnault (born 1946), French-Swedish photographer and convicted sex offender

== See also ==
- Bois-Arnault
