= Éclairs sur l'Au-Delà... =

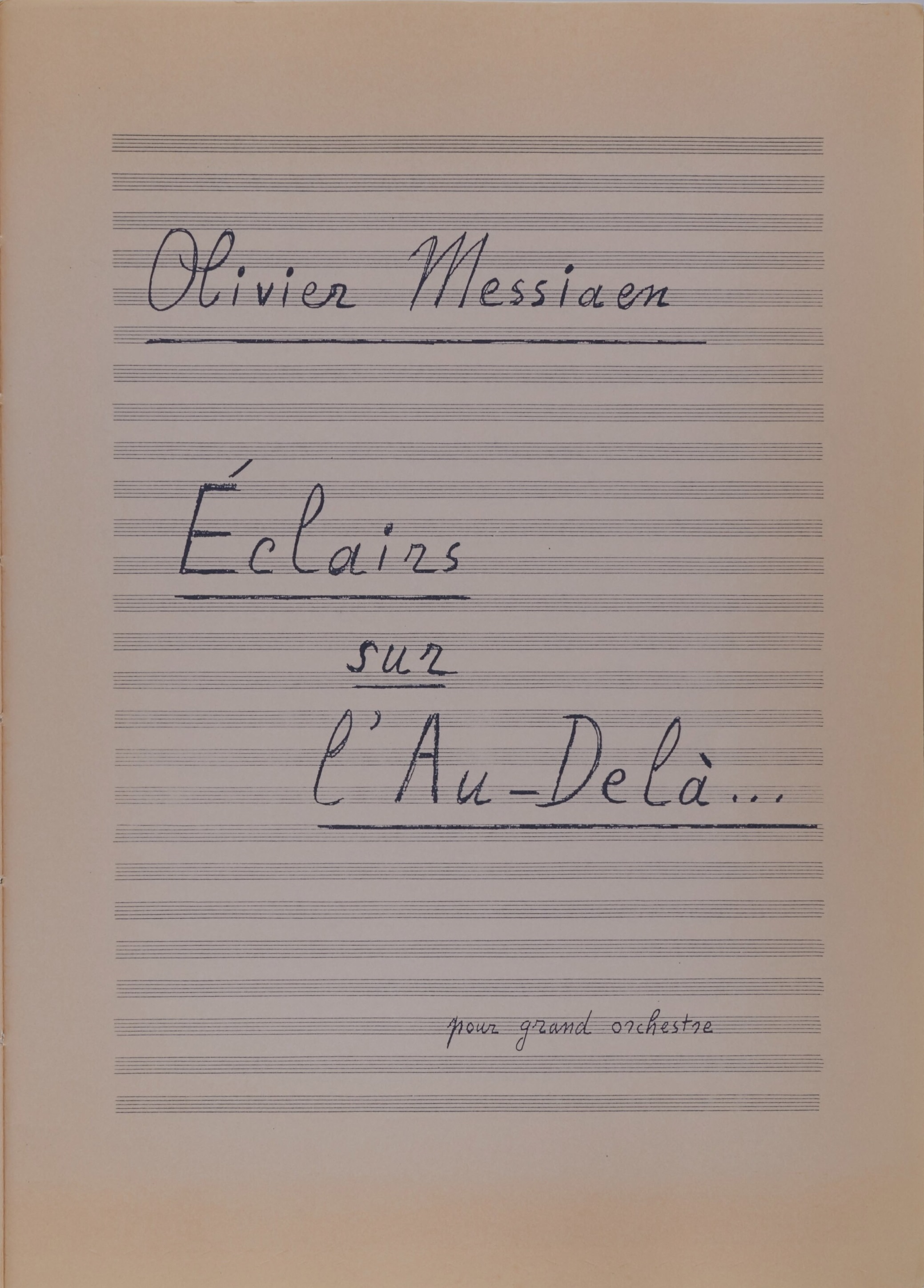
Title page of the manuscript

Éclairs sur l'Au-Delà... (Lightning Over the Beyond... ) is the final completed work of the composer Olivier Messiaen. Scored for a very large orchestra of over a hundred players and unusually lacking a solo piano part, it was written from 1988 to 1991.

Commissioned by the New York Philharmonic for its 150th anniversary in 1992, Éclairs was first performed by that orchestra at Lincoln Center with Zubin Mehta conducting on 5 November of the anniversary year, just over six months after the composer's death.

== Title ==
"Éclairs" are flashes of lightning; "sur" translates in this context as over rather than on (cf. éclairs sur Paris, lightning over Paris); "l'Au-delà", capitalized, refers to the Hereafter, the afterlife, or, literally, the beyond. Messiaen extends the imagery of the heavenly city with pearly gates described in the Book of Revelation. The weather event has the light, representing Jesus, and links to space and astronomy — two of the three threads in the 70-minute composition. Expression of theological ideas from the Catholic faith, and an often ecstatic intention, are characteristic of the composer.

== Structure ==
The third thread, birdsong, is transcribed into several of the eleven movements of the score. The specific birdsong used originates in Australia, New Zealand, Papua New Guinea and Singapore. Messiaen's sole visit to Australia was during the Australian Bicentenary in 1988, during the period he was writing Éclairs. Messiaen had used Australian birdsong before, for example in Saint François d'Assise. Another of his favorite techniques, modes of limited transposition, are also used. The movements are:

1. "Apparition du Christ glorieux" (Apparition of the Glorious Christ)
2. "La constellation du Sagittaire" (The Constellation of Sagittarius)
3. "L'oiseau-lyre et la ville-fiancée" (The Lyrebird and the Bridal City)
4. "Les élus marqués du sceau" (The Elected Ones Marked With the Seal)
5. "Demeurer dans l'amour" (To Abide in Love)
6. "Les Sept Anges aux sept trompettes" (The Seven Angels On the Seven Trumpets)
7. "Et Dieu essuiera toute larme de leurs yeux" (And God Will Wipe Every Tear From Their Eyes)
8. "Les étoiles et la gloire" (The Stars and Glory)
9. "Plusieurs oiseaux des arbres de vie" (Several Birds of the Trees of Life)
10. "Le chemin de l'invisible" (The Way of the Invisible)
11. "Le Christ, lumière du Paradis" (The Christ, Light of Paradise)

== Instrumentation ==
The work is scored for an orchestra of 128, consisting of:

- woodwinds – 3 piccolos, 6 flutes, alto flute, 3 oboes, English horn, 2 E♭ clarinets, 6 clarinets in B-flat, bass clarinet, contrabass clarinet, 3 bassoons, contrabassoon
- brass – 2 trumpets in D, 3 trumpets in C, 6 horns (in F and B-flat; horns 1, 3, 5: high, horns 2, 4, 6: low), 3 trombones (tenor-bass), 2 tubas in C, contrabass tuba in C
- keyboard percussion – crotales, glockenspiel, xylophone, xylorimba, marimba
- percussion (10 players) –
  1. first player of tubular bells
  2. second player of tubular bells
  3. third player of tubular bells
  4. 3 triangles
  5. wind machine, bass drum, second triangle
  6. wood block, 6 temple blocks, reco-reco, third triangle
  7. 3 high gongs, whip
  8. small suspended cymbal, suspended cymbal, large suspended cymbal
  9. 3 large gongs, bass drum
  10. small tamtam, tamtam, very large tamtam
- strings – 16 first violins, 16 second violins, 14 violas, 12 cellos, 10 double basses (with 5 strings).
