= Ocean drum =

Percussion instrument

The ocean drum is a percussion instrument that emulates the sounds of the ocean, invented by Olivier Messiaen in 1972.

== History ==
The ocean drum was originally called the geophone. It was invented by composer and ornithologist Olivier Messiaen for his orchestral piece Des canyons aux étoiles... in 1972, inspired by the Native American water drum.

The first prototype of the 'geophone' was constructed by a Parisian instrument maker. Soon after, the instrument began gaining more renown and is now commonly known by the term ocean drum.

The geophone was originally designed to replicate the sounds of dry and shifting earth; only later being applied to the sounds of the ocean.

== Playing ==
The ocean drum is held by the frame, with the heads horizontal, and played by rolling the wrists so the drum gently tilts in all directions. The metal beads inside roll over the bottom head like water rolling over the shore. Different speeds produce different sounds. Stopping and starting suddenly creates crashing wave sounds.The ocean drum can be used in Buddhist meditation.

== See also ==
- Water drum
- Hydraulophone
- Geophone
- Rainstick
