= La Transfiguration de Notre Seigneur Jésus-Christ =

Oratorio by Olivier Messiaen, premièred 1969

La Transfiguration de Notre Seigneur Jésus-Christ ("The Transfiguration of Our Lord Jesus Christ") is an oratorio written between 1965 and 1969 by Olivier Messiaen. Based on the account found in the synoptic gospels of Jesus' transfiguration, its writing is on a colossal scale, requiring around two-hundred performers. The forces required include a mixed choir, seven instrumental soloists and a large orchestra; only being surpassed by his opera Saint François d'Assise.

== Background ==
On hearing "an old priest deliver a sermon on the light and the filiation", Messiaen began ruminating on the transfiguration story in the 1940s. By the time he began to write the music, he had not composed vocal music for seventeen years, since his solo choral work Cinq rechants. Warmer tonal harmonies reappeared in this work, in contrast to the harmonies he had been using for other works of the period.

Messiaen makes extensive use of birdsong throughout the piece, including the songs of the greater honeyguide, Alpine chough, accentor, superb starling, Baltimore oriole, rock thrush, blue mockingbird and peregrine falcon.

== Performance history ==
The world première was directed by Serge Baudo on 7 June 1969 in Lisbon, Portugal. The American premiere was held from 27 to 30 March 1972 in Washington, D.C. with the National Symphony Orchestra and the Westminster Choir; Antal Dorati was the conductor. Dorati conducted the same forces for Decca Records in a recording one month later.

The US West Coast première was in 1981 in San Francisco, California, with the Berkeley Symphony and the Contra Costa Chorale under the direction of Kent Nagano. Preparation for this performance was supervised by Messiaen himself.

== Structure ==
The music is divided into 14 movements, grouped into two septénaires (sets of seven), for about one and a half hours. The texts are largely derived from the Bible, particularly Matthew's account of the Transfiguration. Also included are some parts of Thomas Aquinas's Summa Theologica.

First Septenary

1. Récit évangélique (Gospel)
2. Configuratum corpori claritatis suae (To be like his glorified body)
3. Christus Jesus, splendor Patris (Jesus, reflection of the Father)
4. Récit évangélique (Gospel)
5. Quam dilecta tabernacula tua (How lovely are your tabernacles)
6. Candor est lucis aeternae (She is the reflection of eternal light)
7. Choral de la sainte montagne (Chorale of the holy mountain)

Second Septenary

8. Récit évangélique (Gospel)
9. Perfecte conscius perfectae generationis (Perfectly conscious of that perfect generation)
10. Adoptionem filiorum perfectam (The perfect adoption of sons)
11. Récit évangélique (Gospel)
12. Terribilis est locus iste (How awesome is this place)
13. Tota Trinitas apparuit (The whole Trinity appeared)
14. Choral de la lumière de gloire (Chorale of the light of glory)

== Instrumentation ==
The oratorio is scored for a mixed choir (ten voices per part), seven instrumental soloists, and a massive orchestra.

- Woodwinds: two piccoli, three flutes, three oboes, cor anglais, piccolo clarinet in E-flat, three clarinets in B-flat, bass clarinet in B-flat, three bassoons, contrabassoon
- Brass: six horns in F, piccolo trumpet in D, three trumpets in C, three trombones, bass trombone, tuba, saxhorn, contrabass tuba
- Soloists: flute, clarinet, xylorimba, vibraphone, marimba, cello, piano
- Choir: twenty soprani, ten mezzosoprani, twenty contralti, twenty tenors, ten baritones, twenty basses
- Strings: sixteen first violins, sixteen second violins, fourteen viola, twelve violoncelli, ten contrabasses
- Percussionists:
1. triangle, tubular bells, güiro, three small Turkish cymbals, suspended cymbal, clash cymbals
2. crotales, claves, woodblock, six temple-blocks, a pair of maracas, luminophone, clash cymbals
3. tubular bells
4. seven gongs
5. three tam-tams
6. suspended cymbal, three toms, bass drum

== Bibliography ==
- Dingle, Christopher (2007). The Life of Messiaen. Cambridge & New York: Cambridge University Press. ISBN 0-521-63547-0.
- Dingle, Christopher, & Nigel Simeone (eds) (2007). Olivier Messiaen: Music, Art and Literature. Aldershot: Ashgate. ISBN 0-7546-5297-1.
- Samuel, Claude (tr. E. Thomas Glasow) (1994). Olivier Messiaen: Music and Color: Conversations with Claude Samuel. Portland, Oregon: Amadeus Press. ISBN 0-931340-67-5.
- Sherlaw Johnson, Robert (1975). Messiaen. Berkeley and Los Angeles: University of California Press. ISBN 0-520-02812-0.
