= Emmanuele Baldini =

Italian violinist and conductor

Emmanuele Baldini (born 29 December 1971) is an Italian violinist and conductor.

== Biography ==
Baldini was born in Trieste. The son of two pianists, he was attracted to the violin when he was seven years old. Baldini started his studies with Bruno Polli at the Conservatorio di Musica Giuseppe Tartini, in Trieste. He then went to the Conservatoire de Musique de Genève, where he was taught by Corrado Romano, after which he further continued his studies with Ruggiero Ricci at the Salzburg Mozarteum. Much later, he also studied conducting with Frank Shipway and Isaac Karabtchevsky. Baldini was the winner of several international competitions, such as the Viennese "Forum Junger Künstler" and the "Premier Prix de Virtuosité" in Geneva. He also received the third prize at the Concorso Lipizer di Gorizia, in his homeland, Italy.

He performed as a soloist throughout Italy as well as the main concert halls of Europe, including the Vienna Konzerthaus, the Linz Brucknersaal, Geneva's Victoria Hall, the Gasteig in Monaco, as well as venues in cities including Berlin, Cologne, Frankfurt, Salzburg, Ljubljana, Brussels, Budapest, Luxemburg, Paris and Copenhagen. Baldini was also invited to perform as soloist in orchestral pieces and in chamber music in many concerts and recitals outside Europe; in Japan, Australia, the United States and above all in Brazil, where he has been living since 2005. Baldini has interpreted the main concerti of the violin repertoire with orchestras such as the Wiener Kammerorchester, Rundfunk-Sinfonieorchester Berlin, L'Orchestre de la Suisse Romande, São Paulo State Symphonic Orchestra, Flanders Youth Philharmonic Orchestra and Orchestra da Camara di Mantova, the latter of which with conductors such as Claudio Abbado, Riccardo Muti, Daniele Gatti, Franco Gulli and Franco Rossi. He was the concertmaster of Orchestra del Teatro Comunale di Bologna, Orchestra del Teatro Giuseppe Verdi di Trieste and Orquestra Sinfónica de Galicia as well as on the first desk of the Orchestra del Teatro alla Scala di Milano.

Presently, Baldini is a concertmaster at São Paulo State Symphonic Orchestra (OSESP) and also leader and founder of the OSESP Quartet (with second violin Davi Graton, violist Peter Pas and cellist Ilia Laporev). Recent collaborations include such artists as Maria João Pires, Jean-Philippe Collard, Antonio Meneses, Fábio Zanon, Caio Pagano, Jean-Efflam Bavouzet, Ricardo Castro, Nicholas Angelich and Lilya Zilberstein.

== Discography ==
- Carl Maria von Weber, Felix Mendelssohn-Bartholdy, Sonate per violino e pianoforte – Emmanuele Baldini/Lorenzo Baldini, 1996 AGORÀ MUSIC
- Albéric Magnard, César Franck, Sonates pour Violon et Piano – Emmanuele Baldini/Lorenzo Baldini, 1996 AGORÀ MUSIC
- Paolo Pessina, Chamber Works for Violin and Piano – Emmanuele Baldini/Roberto Turrin, 1996 EPIC MUSIC
- Luigi Gatti, Sei sonate per violino e viola – Emmanuele Baldini/Thomas Cavuoto, 1997 AGORÀ MUSIC
- Giovan Battista Viotti, Duetti – Emmanuele Baldini/Simona Cavuoto, 1997 AGORÀ MUSIC
- Giuseppe Tartini, Nicolò Paganini – Interpreti Veneziani/Emmanuele Baldini, 1996 IN.VE.NICE SOUND
- G.B. Viotti, Sonates pour Violon et Basse Op.IV – Emmanuele Baldini/Marco Decimo, 1999 AGORÀ MUSIC
- Giuseppe Martucci, Trio op. 59, Sonata op. 22, Tre pezzi op. 67, Melodia – Lorenzo Baldini/Emmanuele Baldini/Marco Ferri, 2000 AGORÀ MUSIC
- Locatelli, L'arte del violino – 24 Caprices for Violin – Emmanuele Baldini, 2012 NEWTON CLASSICS
- Meeting Brahms – Brahms Violin & Piano Sonatas – Emmanuele Baldini/Caio Pagano, 2012 SOUNDSET RECORDINGS
- Juliana D'Agostini + Emmanuele Baldini – Juliana D'Agostini/Emmanuele Baldini, 2013 LUA MUSIC
- Cage+ – Dana Radu/Emmanuele Baldini/Michele Agnes, 2014 SESC
- Heitor Villa-Lobos Complete Violin Sonatas - Emmanuele Baldini / Pablo Rossi, 2021 Naxos
- Bliss of Heaven: Music of the New World — Daniel Rojas (composer-pianist), Emmanuele Baldini, Baldini Quartet, 2021 Da Vinci Classics C00379
