= The Sacrifice (opera) =

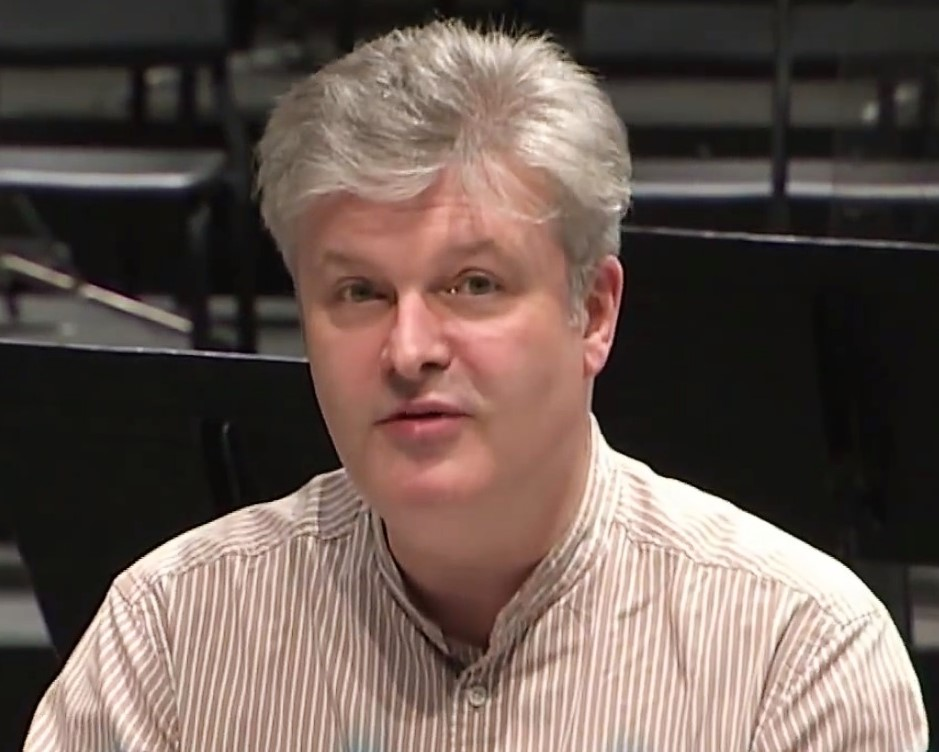
James MacMillan in 2012

The Sacrifice is an opera in three acts composed by James MacMillan with a libretto by the poet Michael Symmons Roberts based on the Branwen story of the Welsh mythology collection, the Mabinogion. The world premiere took place on 22 September 2007 at the Donald Gordon Theatre of the Wales Millennium Centre, Cardiff. The production was staged by Welsh National Opera, directed by Katie Mitchell and conducted by the composer.

== Instrumentation ==
The orchestra consists of 2 flutes, 2 piccolos, 2 oboes, cor anglais, 2 clarinets, bass clarinet, 2 bassoons, contrabassoon, 5 horns, 3 trumpets, 3 trombones, tuba, timpani (five drums in total) with a large percussion section for 3 players as well as 12 first violins, 10 second violins, 8 violas, 6 cellos, 4 double basses.

The first percussionist plays glockenspiel, vibraphone (with two double bass bows), triangle, whistle, geophone, whip, tambourine, 1 bodrán, bass drum, 2 Peking gongs.

The second percussionist plays the same glockenspiel as the first percussionist, tubular bells, the same geophone as the first percussionist, 5 wood blocks (graded), anvil, snare drum and suspended cymbal.

The third percussionist plays 2 chromatic octaves of crotales (with two double bass bows), 5 tuned gongs (one large, three medium and one small), güiro, vibraslap, 1 metal sheet, tenor drum, a pair of crash cymbals and tam-tam.

Also required are harp, electric piano and onstage two tambourines and an electric guitar.

== Roles ==
- Sian (soprano)
- Evan (baritone)
- General (bass-baritone)
- Megan (soprano)
- Mal (tenor)

== Interludes ==
MacMillan extracted material from the opera to create a piece for orchestra, Three Interludes from 'The Sacrifice'. The sections are called "The Parting", "Passacaglia", and "The Investiture". At the U.S. premiere on August 15, 2009, by the Cabrillo Music Festival Orchestra under Marin Alsop. The BBC Philharmonic Orchestra recorded the work under MacMillan's direction.
