= An Alpine Symphony =

1915 symphonic poem by Richard Strauss

- by Richard Strauss
- Native name: Eine Alpensinfonie
- Catalogue: TrV 233
- Opus: 64
- Composed: 1911–15
- Dedication: Count Nicolaus Seebach
- Recorded: 1925
- Duration: about 50 minutes
- Scoring: Orchestra

Premiere
- Date: October 28, 1915
- Location: Berlin
- Conductor: Richard Strauss
- Performers: Dresden Hofkapelle

An Alpine Symphony (Eine Alpensinfonie), Op. 64, TrV 233, is a tone poem for large orchestra written by German composer Richard Strauss which premiered in 1915. It is one of Strauss's largest non-operatic works; the score calls for about 125 players and a typical performance usually lasts around 50 minutes. The program of An Alpine Symphony depicts the experiences of eleven hours (from daybreak just before dawn to nightfall) spent climbing an Alpine mountain.

== History ==
Strauss's An Alpine Symphony was completed in 1915, eleven years after the completion of its immediate predecessor in the genre of the tone poem, Symphonia Domestica. In 1911, Strauss wrote that he was "torturing [himself] with a symphony – a job that, when all's said and done, amuses me even less than chasing cockroaches".

One point of influence comes from Strauss's love of nature. As a boy, Strauss experienced an Alpine adventure similar to the one described in his An Alpine Symphony: he and a group of climbers lost their way heading up a mountain and were caught in a storm and soaked on the way down. Strauss loved the mountains so much that in 1908 he built a home in Garmisch-Partenkirchen, Bavaria, that boasted stunning views of the Alps. This interest in nature can also point to Strauss's following of the philosopher Friedrich Nietzsche.

The original drafts of An Alpine Symphony began in 1899. It was to be written in memory of the Swiss painter, Karl Stauffer-Bern, and the work was originally titled Künstlertragödie (Tragedy of an Artist). This fell by the wayside, but Strauss began a new four-movement work called Die Alpen (The Alps) in which he used parts of the original 1899 draft. The first movement of Die Alpen evolved into the core of An Alpine Symphony. Sketches were made, but Strauss eventually left the work unfinished.

Years later, upon the death of his good friend Gustav Mahler in 1911, Strauss decided to revisit the work. In his journal the day after he learned of Mahler's death, Strauss wrote:

The death of this aspiring, idealistic, energetic artist [is] a grave loss ... Mahler, the Jew, could achieve elevation in Christianity. As an old man the hero Wagner returned to it under the influence of Schopenhauer. It is clear to me that the German nation will achieve new creative energy only by liberating itself from Christianity ... I shall call my alpine symphony: Der Antichrist, since it represents: moral purification through one's own strength, liberation through work, worship of eternal, magnificent nature.

The resulting draft of the work was to be a two-part work titled Der Antichrist: Eine Alpensinfonie; however, Strauss never finished the second part. Instead, he dropped the first half of the title (named after an 1888 book by Nietzsche) and called his single-movement work simply An Alpine Symphony. After so many years of intermittent composition, once Strauss began work on the piece in earnest the progress was quick. Strauss even went so far as to remark that he composed An Alpine Symphony "just as a cow gives milk". Orchestration for the work began on 1 November 1914, and was completed by the composer only three months later. In reference to this, his final purely symphonic work, Strauss famously commented at the dress rehearsal for An Alpine Symphony's premiere that at last he had learned to orchestrate. The entire work was finished on 8 February 1915. The score was dedicated "in profound gratitude" to Count Nicolaus Seebach, director of the Royal Opera in Dresden, where four of the six operas Strauss had written by that time had been premiered.

== Scoring and structure ==
An Alpine Symphony is scored for a large orchestra consisting of:

Woodwinds
4 flutes (3rd and 4th doubling piccolos)
3 oboes (3rd doubling English horn)
1 heckelphone
1 clarinet in E♭
2 clarinets in B♭
1 bass clarinet (doubling clarinet in C)
4 bassoons (4th doubling contrabassoon)

Brass
8 French horns (horns 5–8 double Wagner tubas)
4 trumpets
4 trombones
2 tubas

12 offstage horns
2 offstage trumpets
2 offstage trombones

Percussion
timpani (2 players)

snare drum
bass drum
cymbals
triangle
tam-tam
cowbells
wind machine
thunder machine
glockenspiel

Keyboard
celesta
organ

Strings
2 harps (2 parts)

18 violins I
16 violins II
12 violas
10 cellos
8 double basses (5- part string section)

Strauss further suggested that the harps and some woodwind instruments should be doubled if possible and indicated that the stated number of string players should be regarded as a minimum.

The use of "Samuel's Aerophon" is suggested in the instrumentation listing. (Strauss probably misunderstood the name – it was originally called the Aerophor.) This long-extinct device, invented by Dutch flautist Bernard Samuels in 1911 to assist wind players in sustaining long notes without interruption, was a foot-pump with an air-hose stretching to the player's mouth. However, modern wind players make use of the technique of circular breathing, whereby it is possible to inhale through the nose while still sustaining the sound by matching the blowing pressure in the mouth.

Another oddity with the scoring is that the part written for the heckelphone goes down to F_{2}, while the lowest note the heckelphone can play is A_{2}. Attempts to address this issue have led to the invention of the lupophone.

=== Program ===
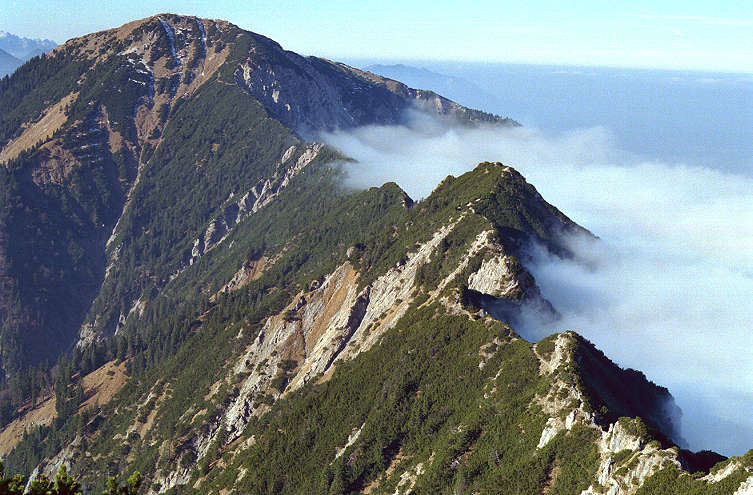
The Heimgarten in Southern Bavaria, where Strauss drew inspiration for the composition.

Although performed as one continuous movement, An Alpine Symphony has a distinct program which describes each phase of the Alpine journey in chronological order. The score includes the following section titles (not numbered in the score):

1. Nacht (Night)
2. Sonnenaufgang (Sunrise)
3. Der Anstieg (The Ascent)
4. Eintritt in den Wald (Entry into the Forest)
5. Wanderung neben dem Bache (Wandering by the Brook)
6. Am Wasserfall (At the Waterfall)
7. Erscheinung (Apparition)
8. Auf blumigen Wiesen (On Flowering Meadows)
9. Auf der Alm (On the Alpine Pasture)
10. Durch Dickicht und Gestrüpp auf Irrwegen (Through Thickets and Undergrowth on the Wrong Path)
11. Auf dem Gletscher (On the Glacier)
12. Gefahrvolle Augenblicke (Dangerous Moments)
13. Auf dem Gipfel (On the Summit)
14. Vision (Vision)
15. Nebel steigen auf (Mists Rise)
16. Die Sonne verdüstert sich allmählich (The Sun Gradually Becomes Obscured)
17. Elegie (Elegy)
18. Stille vor dem Sturm (Calm Before the Storm)
19. Gewitter und Sturm, Abstieg (Thunderstorm and Tempest, Descent)
20. Sonnenuntergang (Sunset)
21. Ausklang (Quiet Settles / Epilogue)
22. Nacht (Night)

In terms of formal analysis, attempts have been made to group these sections together to form a "gigantic Lisztian symphonic form, with elements of an introduction, opening allegro, scherzo, slow movement, finale, and epilogue." In general, however, it is believed that comparisons to any kind of traditional symphonic form are secondary to the strong sense of structure created by the piece's musical pictorialism and detailed narrative.

=== Themes, form, and analysis ===
==== Introduction ====
Though labelled as a symphony by the composer, An Alpine Symphony is rather a tone poem as it forgoes the conventions of the traditional multi-movement symphony and consists of twenty-two continuous sections of music. Strauss's An Alpine Symphony opens on a unison B♭ in the strings, horns, and lower woodwinds. From this note, a dark B♭ minor scale slowly descends. Each new note is sustained until, eventually, every degree of the scale is heard simultaneously, creating an "opaque mass" of tone representing the deep, mysterious night on the mountain. Trombones and tuba emerge from this wash of sound to solemnly declaim the mountain theme, a majestic motive which recurs often in later sections of the piece.

This passage is a rare instance of Strauss's use of polytonality, as the shifting harmony in the middle part of the mountain theme (which includes a D minor triad) clashes intensely with the sustained notes of the B♭ minor scale.

As night gives way to daylight in "Sunrise", the theme of the sun is heard—a glorious descending A major scale which is thematically related to the opening scale depicting night time. A secondary theme characterized by a tied triplet figure and featured numerously in the first half of the piece appears immediately afterwards and fully establishes itself 7 measures later in D♭ major (the relative major of B♭ minor).

==== Exposition ====
In terms of form, the section labelled "The Ascent" can be seen as the end of An Alpine Symphony's slow introduction and beginning of the work's allegro proper. Harmonically, this passage moves away from the dark B♭ minor of the opening and firmly establishes the key of E♭ major. It is in "The Ascent", the first subject theme, that Strauss presents two more main musical motives which will prominently return throughout the entire piece. The first is a marching theme full of dotted rhythms which is presented in the lower strings and harp, the shape of which actually suggests the physical act of climbing through the use of large upwards leaps.

The second is a pointed, triumphant fanfare played by the brass which comes to represent the more rugged, dangerous aspects of the climb.

It is just after the appearance of this second climbing motive that we hear the distant sounds of a hunting party, deftly represented by Strauss through the use of an offstage band of twelve horns, two trumpets, and two trombones. As Norman Del Mar points out, "the fanfares are wholly non-motivic and neither the hunting horns nor their phrases are heard again throughout the work". The use of unique musical motives and instrumentation in this passage reinforces the idea of distance created by the offstage placement—these sounds belong to a party of people on an entirely different journey.

Upon entering the wood there is an abrupt change of texture and mood—the "instrumental tones deepen as thick foliage obscures the sunlight". A new meandering theme in C minor, which acts as the second subject theme, is presented by the horns and trombones:

This is followed by a more relaxed version of the marching theme, presented in A♭ major. This theme serves as a closing theme of the exposition. Birdcalls are heard in the upper woodwinds and a solo string quartet leads the transition into the next musical section.

==== Development ====
The following portion of the piece can be interpreted as a large development-like section which encompasses several different phases of the climb. In "Wandering by the Brook", there is an increasing sense of energy—rushing passage-work gives way to cascading scale figures in the winds and strings and marks the beginning of the section which takes place "At the Waterfall" and "Apparition". The brilliant, glittering instrumental writing in this passage makes it one of the most "vividly specific" moments of tone painting within An Alpine Symphony.

The later section "On Flowering Meadows" also makes extensive use of orchestral pictorialism—the meadow is suggested by a gentle backdrop of high string chords, the marching theme is heard softly in the cellos, and isolated points of color (short notes in the winds, harp, and pizzicato in the violas, representing small Alpine flowers) dot the landscape. In this section, a wavy motif in the strings appears and will feature more prominently at the summit as a majestic dotted rhythm.

In the following section, which takes place "On the Alpine Pasture", the use of cowbells, bird calls, a yodeling motive first heard on the English horn, and even the bleating of sheep (depicted through flutter tonguing in the oboe and E♭ clarinet) creates both a strong visual and aural image. The first horn and top strings introduce another secondary figure similar to the secondary motif during "sunrise", a secondary rhythm to be featured at the summit.

As the climbers move along through the next two sections ("Through Thickets and Undergrowth on the Wrong Path" and "On the Glacier") the going gets a bit rougher, however, and when we get to "Dangerous Moments" the idea of insecurity and peril is suggested by the fragmentary nature of the texture and the use of the pointed second climbing theme.

Suddenly, we are "On the Summit" as four trombones present a theme known as "the peak motive", the shape of which (with its powerful upward leaps of fourths and fifths) is reminiscent of Strauss's famous opening to Also Sprach Zarathustra. This passage is the centerpiece of the score, and after a solo oboe stammers out a hesitant melody the section gradually builds up using a succession of themes heard previously in the piece, finally culminating in what Del Mar calls the "long-awaited emotional climax of the symphony": a return of the sun theme, now gloriously proclaimed in C major.

With a sudden switch of tonality to F♯ major, however, the piece is propelled into the next section, entitled "Vision." This is a somewhat developmental passage which gradually incorporates several of the main musical subjects of the symphony together and which is composed of unstable, shifting harmonies. It is during this portion of the piece that the organ first enters, adding even more depth to Strauss's already enormous performing forces.

There is an abrupt shift of mood and character as the section titled "Mists Rise" begins. This atmosphere of tension and anxiety continues to grow through the next two sections ("The Sun Gradually Becomes Obscured" and "Elegy"). By the time the piece reaches the "Calm Before the Storm", a combination of a motif heard during the Elegy and the stammering oboe motive heard previously at the peak is repeated ominously and quietly in a minor key.

In this section, ominous drum rolls (distant thunder), stammering instruments, isolated raindrops (short notes in the upper woodwinds and pizzicato in the violins), flashes of lightning (in the piccolo), the use of a wind machine, and suggestions of darkness (through the use of a descending scale motive reminiscent of the opening "Night" theme) lead the piece into the full fury of the storm. There is also a long dominant pedal on the bass at the end of this section; we are moving back to the work's original key of B♭ minor.

==== Recapitulation ====
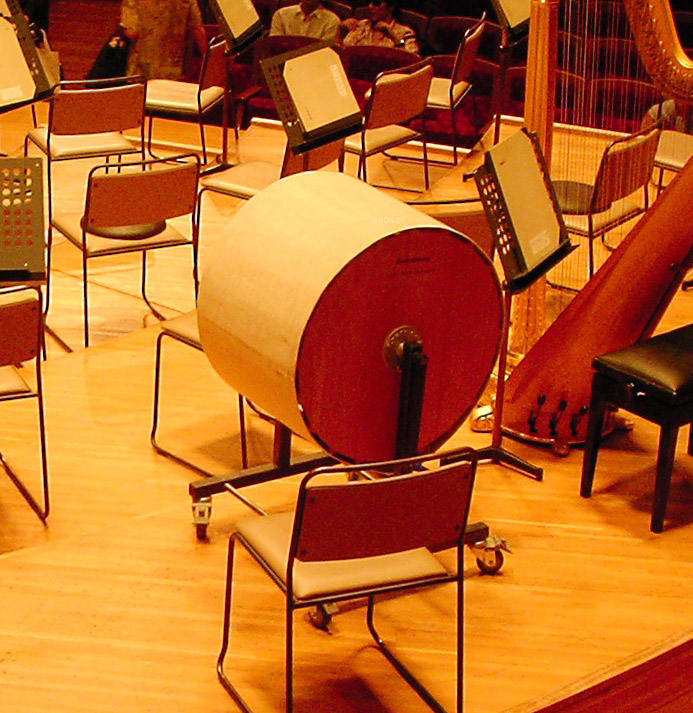
A modern wind machine, an instrument that is used to create storm effects

"Thunderstorm and Tempest, Descent" marks the start of the last phase of the journey described in An Alpine Symphony. It is in this passage that Strauss calls for the largest instrumentation in the entire piece, including the use of a thundersheet (Donnermaschine), a "thunder trio" (two sets of timpani and a bass drum), the wind machine, piccolos (lightning), and heavy use of organ. Heavy downpours of rain are depicted by rapid descending scale passages on the strings (again reminiscent of the opening "Night" theme). In modern performances, these storm sounds can be supplemented with synthesized sound effects to create an even more tremendous effect.

This section would also mark the recapitulation of the tone poem, as it brings back the elements that were previously heard in this work.

As the sodden climbers quickly retrace their steps down the mountain (as an inversion of the "Ascent" theme is heard in the work's original minor key) and pass through one familiar scene after another, many of the musical ideas introduced earlier in the piece are heard once again, though this time in reverse order, at a very quick pace, and in combination with the raging fury of the tempest. For instance, there is a stormy return of the "Woods" theme in E♭ major (which now serves as the second subject theme of the recapitulation).

Eventually, however, the musical storm begins to subside, with some echos of thunder still heard in the distance. The heavy, driving rain is replaced once again by isolated drops in the woodwinds and pizzicato strings. The section ends off with a brief motif of the night theme (the mountain motif, from the opening).

==== Coda ====
After the storm the piece is gradually ushered into a beautiful "Sunset", with the sun theme being proclaimed the strings in G♭ major. In "Sunset", the established sun theme is given a slow, spacious treatment, eventually reaching a radiant climax which then transitions into a minor key as it apparently dies away in favor of the night theme. Some believe the symphony's "coda" begins at "Sunset"—rather than present any new musical material, these last three sections are full of "wistful nostalgia" for the beautiful moments earlier in the piece.

The piece transitions into "Ausklang (Quiet Settles/Epilogue)", which is marked to be played "in gentle ecstasy", as it parallels the earlier "Vision" section, but with a much softer, more peaceful character. Starting off the sun theme is played solemnly by organ and brass, followed by the peak theme on woodwinds first and then brass (similar to the triumphant tone in "Summit", albeit a more muted climax), then recapitulated on strings as the sun and peak motives are then brought together in a coda, followed by a solo piccolo (the same melody heard at the end of "On the Alpine Pasture"). Afterwards, as the sun theme appears for the last time, the harmony moves from the E♭ major established in "Ausklang" (a key which parallels that of "The Ascent", the start of An Alpine Symphony's "exposition") back to the darkness and mystery of B♭ minor.

In these shadowy final moments of the piece, the sustained descending scale from the opening "Night" is heard once more, reaching a depth of six full octaves. As the brass emerge from the sound to deeply proclaim the mountain theme one final time, it is almost as if "the giant outlines of the noble mass can just be discerned in the gloom". In the final few measures, the violins play a slow, haunting variation of the marching theme, ending with a final, dying glissando to the last note, and in the key of B♭ minor.

== Premiere and reception ==
An Alpine Symphony was premiered on 28 October 1915, with Strauss conducting the orchestra of the Dresden Hofkapelle in Berlin. The performance provoked mixed reactions. Some even called it "cinema music". Strauss was happy with how this piece turned out, however, and wrote to a friend in 1915 that "you must hear the Alpine Symphony on December 5; it really is quite a good piece!"

The American premiere of An Alpine Symphony was performed by Ernst Kunwald leading the Cincinnati Symphony Orchestra on 27 April 1916. Kunwald and certain "influential Cincinnatians" had taken great pains to get the piece from wartime Germany and to be the first orchestra to perform Strauss's new work in America. As a result, An Alpine Symphony had originally been scheduled to be premiered in Cincinnati on 4 May of that year. However, when Leopold Stokowski suddenly announced that he would premiere the work with the Philadelphia Orchestra on 28 April, Kunwald and the Cincinnati Orchestra immediately began preparation of the piece. On 25 April, the orchestra was finally able to play An Alpine Symphony all the way through at a rehearsal in Cincinnati and, two days later, sent word to local papers inviting patrons to a performance of the piece that very day at noon. Ultimately, two thousand people attended this unofficial American premiere of the work, which took place a little over 24 hours before the Philadelphia performance.

== Recordings ==
On DVD: 2003, BMG Ariola Classics GmbH, 2002 Arte Nova. 82876 50663 9. "Photo-film" by Tobias Melle from the Alpes without visible orchestra. Tonhalle-orchester Zurich, David Zinman.

Oskar Fried recorded the work in 1925 with the Berlin State Opera Orchestra. Strauss himself conducted the Bavarian Radio Symphony Orchestra in the work's next recording, in 1936. His more ambitious 1941 recording, with the Bavarian State Orchestra, utilized the full orchestral forces called for by the score and was later issued on LP and CD.

Due to the wide dynamic range of the music, the symphony became very popular for high fidelity and stereophonic recordings. The first test pressing of a compact disc was of An Alpine Symphony, made with Herbert von Karajan conducting the Berlin Philharmonic.

Conductor	Orchestra	Year	Label	Catalog
Oskar Fried	Staatskapelle Berlin	1925	Music & Arts	MACD1167
Richard Strauss	Munich Radio Symphony Orchestra	1936	Music & Arts	MACD1057
Karl Böhm	Berlin Radio Symphony Orchestra	1939		
Richard Strauss	Bavarian State Orchestra	1941	Preiser Records	90205
Dimitri Mitropoulos	New York Philharmonic-Symphony Orchestra	1947	Music & Arts	CD-1213
Hans Knappertsbusch	Vienna Philharmonic Orchestra	1952	Altus	ALT 074
Franz Konwitschny	Orchestra of the Munich State Opera	1952	Urania	URN22.247+
Carl Schuricht	Stuttgart Radio Symphony Orchestra	1955	Hänssler Classic	CD 93.151
Dimitri Mitropoulos	Vienna Philharmonic Orchestra	1956	Orfeo	C 586 021 B
Karl Böhm	Staatskapelle Dresden	1957	Deutsche Grammophon	463190
Evgeny Svetlanov	USSR Symphony Orchestra	1962	Melodiya	(LP only)
Yevgeny Mravinsky	Leningrad Philharmonic Orchestra	1964	Melodiya	74321294032
Rudolf Kempe	Royal Philharmonic Orchestra	1966	RCA/Testament	SBT 1428
Yuzo Toyama	NHK Symphony Orchestra	1966	Naxos	NYNN-0020
Rudolf Kempe	Staatskapelle Dresden	1971	EMI Classics	64350
Zubin Mehta	Los Angeles Philharmonic Orchestra	1975	Decca	470954
Georg Solti	Symphonieorchester des Bayerischen Rundfunks	1979	Decca	4406182
Herbert von Karajan	Berliner Philharmoniker	1980	Deutsche Grammophon	439017
Andrew Davis	London Philharmonic Orchestra	1981	Sony	SBK61693
Norman Del Mar	BBC Symphony Orchestra	1982	IMP	15656 91572
André Previn	Philadelphia Orchestra	1983	EMI	72435741162
Pierre Bartholomée	Orchestre philharmonique de Liège	1983	Cypres	CYP7650-12
Kurt Masur	Gewandhausorchester Leipzig	1983	Decca	446 101–2
Herbert von Karajan	Berliner Philharmoniker (DVD)	1983	Sony	88697195429
Bernard Haitink	Royal Concertgebouw Orchestra	1985	Philips	416 156–2
Neeme Järvi	Royal Scottish National Orchestra	1986	Chandos	CHAN 8557
Vladimir Ashkenazy	Cleveland Orchestra	1988	Decca	4251122
Herbert Blomstedt	San Francisco Symphony	1988	Decca	421815
Horst Stein	Bamberg Symphony Orchestra	1988	Eurodisc	69012-2-RG
Edo de Waart	Minnesota Orchestra	1989	Virgin Classics	7234 5 61460 2 0
André Previn	Vienna Philharmonic Orchestra	1989	Telarc	80211
Zubin Mehta	Berliner Philharmoniker	1989	Sony	SMK 60030
Takashi Asahina	NDR Symphony Orchestra	1990	NDR Klassik	NDR10152
Rafael Frühbeck de Burgos	London Symphony Orchestra	1990		
Mariss Jansons	BBC Welsh Symphony Orchestra	1991	BBC Music Magazine	Vol.1 no.5
James Judd	European Community Youth Orchestra	1991	Regis	RRC1055
Daniel Barenboim	Chicago Symphony Orchestra	1992	Warner Elatus	097749837 2
Giuseppe Sinopoli	Staatskapelle Dresden (Also on DVD)	1993	Deutsche Grammophon	439- 899–2
Zdeněk Košler	Czech Philharmonic Orchestra	1994	Supraphon	SU0005-2 031
Choo Hoey	Singapore Symphony Orchestra	1994	DW Labs	
Friedrich Haider	Göteborgs Symfoniker	1995	Nightingale Classics	NC 261864–2
Emil Tabakov	Sofia Philharmonic Orchestra	1996	Laserlight Classics	24 418/2
Seiji Ozawa	Vienna Philharmonic Orchestra	1996	Philips	454 448–2
Rafael Frühbeck de Burgos	Vienna Symphony Orchestra	1996	Calig	CAL 50981
Marek Janowski	Orchestre Philharmonique de Radio France	1997	Radio France	CMX378081.84
Takashi Asahina	Osaka Philharmonic Orchestra	1997	Canyon Classics	PCCL-00540
Andreas Delfs	Milwaukee Symphony Orchestra	1998		
Lorin Maazel	Symphonieorchester des Bayerischen Rundfunks	1998	RCA	74321 57128 2
Vladimir Ashkenazy	Czech Philharmonic Orchestra	1999	Ondine	ODE 976–2
Hartmut Haenchen	Netherlands Philharmonic Orchestra	1999	Brilliant Classics	6366/3
Kazimierz Kord	Warsaw Philharmonic	2000	Accord	ACD 073–2
Christian Thielemann	Vienna Philharmonic Orchestra	2000	Deutsche Grammophon	469519
David Zinman	Zurich Tonhalle Orchestra (Also on DVD)	2002	Arte Nova Classics	74321 92779 2
Gerard Schwarz	Royal Liverpool Philharmonic Orchestra	2003	RLPO Live	RLCD401P
Andrew Litton	National Youth Orchestra of Great Britain	2004	Kevin Mayhew	1490160
Eliahu Inbal	Orchestre de la Suisse Romande	2005	Denon	COCO-70763
Gabriel Feltz	Philharmonisches Orchester des Theaters Altenburg-Gera	2005		
Franz Welser-Möst	Gustav Mahler Jugendorchester	2005	Warner Classics	3345692
Markus Stenz	Ensemble Modern Orchestra	2005	Ensemble Modern Medien	EMCD-003
Antoni Wit	Staatskapelle Weimar	2006	Naxos	8.557811
Rafael Frühbeck de Burgos	Dresdner Philharmonie	2006	Genuin	GEN 86074
Kent Nagano	Deutsches Symphonie-Orchester Berlin (DVD)	2006	Arthaus Musik	101 437
Mariss Jansons	Royal Concertgebouw Orchestra	2007	RCO Live	RCO08006
Jonas Alber	Brunswick State Orchestra	2007	Coviato	COV 30705
Marin Alsop	Baltimore Symphony Orchestra	2007		
Rico Saccani	Budapest Symphony Orchestra	2007	BPO Live	
Bernard Haitink	London Symphony Orchestra	2008	LSO Live	LSO0689
Neeme Järvi	Residente Orchestra The Hague	2008	Video Artists International	4411
Fabio Luisi	Staatskapelle Dresden	2009	Sony	88697558392
Marek Janowski	Pittsburgh Symphony Orchestra	2009	Pentatone Classics	PTC5186339
Philippe Jordan	Orchestre de l'Opéra National de Paris	2009	Naive	V 5233
Semyon Bychkov	WDR Sinfonieorchester	2007	Profil Medien	PH09065
Marcello Rota	Czech National Symphony Orchestra	2009	Victor	VICC-6
Roman Brogli-Sacher	Philharmonisches Orchester Der Hansedtadt Lübeck	2010	Klassic Center	M 56937
Andris Nelsons	City of Birmingham Symphony Orchestra	2010	Orfeo	C 833 111 A
Charles Dutoit	Philadelphia Orchestra	2010	Philadelphia Orchestra	
Franz Welser-Möst	Symphonieorchester des Bayerischen Rundfunks	2010	BR Klassik	900905
Edo de Waart	Royal Flemish Philharmonic Orchestra	2010	RFP Live	RFP001
Gustav Kuhn	Orchester der Tiroler Festspiele Erl	2010	Col Legno	WWE 1CD 60022
Kurt Masur	Orchestre National de France	2010	Radio France	FRF005
Christian Thielemann	Vienna Philharmonic Orchestra (DVD/Blu-ray)	2011	Opus Arte	OA BD 7101D
Frank Shipway	São Paulo Symphony Orchestra	2012	BIS	BIS1950
Vladimir Jurowski	London Philharmonic Orchestra	2012	London Philharmonic Orchestra	LPO-0106
Leon Botstein	American Symphony Orchestra	2012	American Symphony Orchestra	ASO251
Jakub Hrůša	Tokyo Metropolitan Symphony Orchestra	2013	Exton	OVCL-00534
Rafael Frühbeck de Burgos	Danish National Symphony Orchestra (DVD/Blu-ray)	2014	DRS	2110433-35BD
Toshiro Ozawa	Kanagawa University Symphonic Band	2014	Kafua	CACD-0219
Daniel Harding	Saito Kinen Orchestra	2014	Decca	4786422
Christian Thielemann	Staatskapelle Dresden	2014	Unitel Classica	726504
François-Xavier Roth	SWR Sinfonieorchester Baden-Banden und Freiburg	2014	SWR Music	CD93.335
Michael Seal	City of Birmingham Symphony Orchestra Youth Orchestra	2015		
Kent Nagano	Gothenburg Symphony Orchestra	2016	Farao	B108091
Semyon Bychkov	BBC Symphony Orchestra	2016	BBC Music Magazine	Vol.25 no.10
Andrew Davis	Melbourne Symphony Orchestra	2016	ABC Classics	ABC 481 6754
Mariss Jansons	Symphonieorchester des Bayerischen Rundfunks	2016	BR Klassik	900148
Thomas Dausgaard	Seattle Symphony Orchestra	2017	Seattle Symphony Media	SSM1023
James Judd	European Union Youth Orchestra	2017	Alto	ALC1346
Jung-Ho Pak	Texas All-State Symphonic Orchestra	2018	Mark Recordings	
Andrés Orozco-Estrada	Frankfurt Radio Symphony Orchestra	2018	Pentatone	PTC5186628
Andris Nelsons	Boston Symphony Orchestra	2017	Deutsche Grammophone	B09NHN1FFB
Vasily Petrenko	Oslo Philharmonic Orchestra	2017	LAWO	LWC1192
Santtu-Matias Rouvali	Philharmonia Orchestra	2023	Signum Classics (Philharmonia Records)	SIGCD720
Edward Gardner	London Philharmonic Orchestra	2026	London Philharmonic Orchestra	LPO-0140
