= Aerophor =

Bellows to assist players of wind instruments

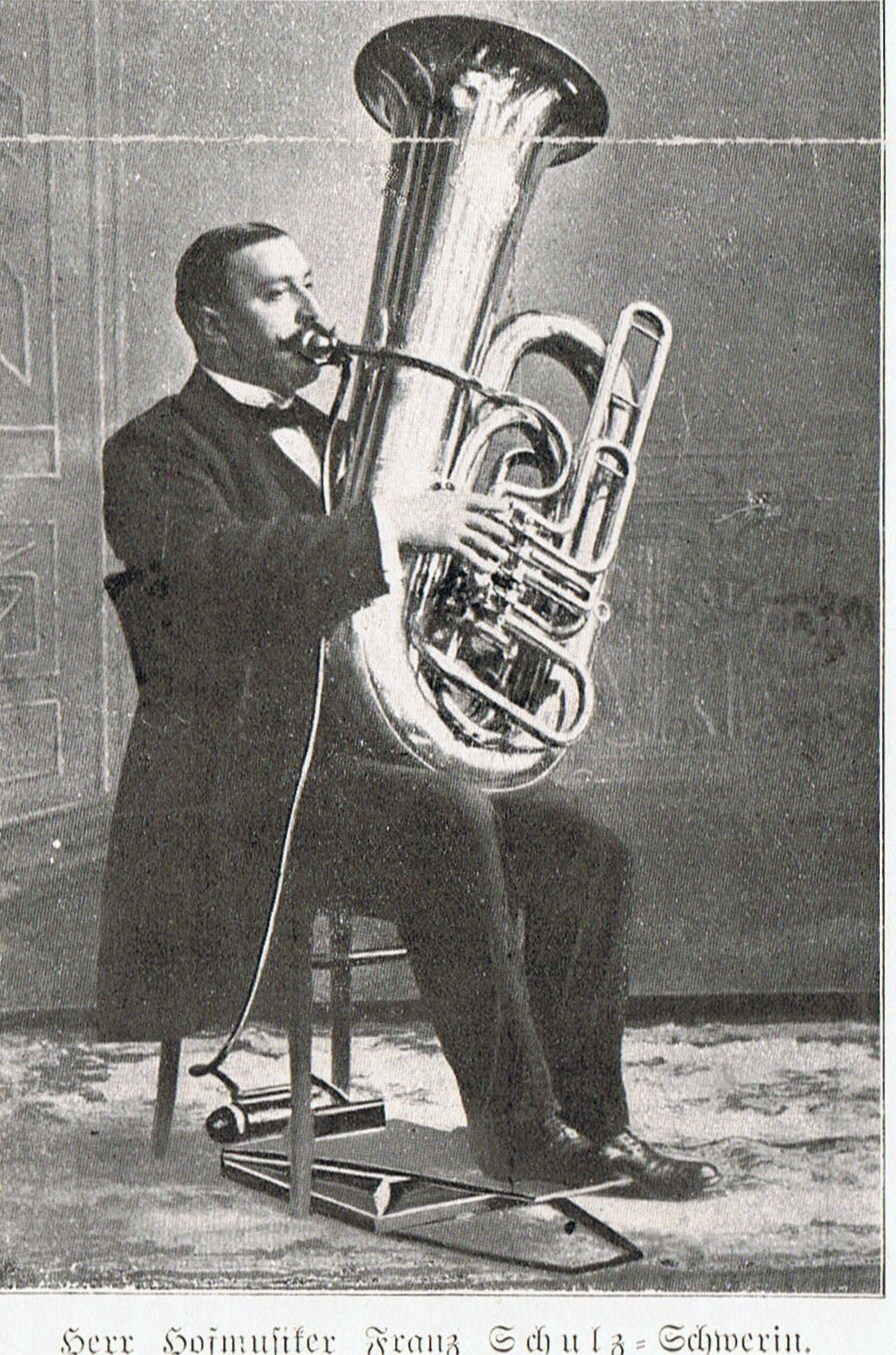
A tuba player using an aerophor.

An aerophor (sometimes spelled aerophore, aerophon, or aerophone) is a device designed to provide an auxiliary breath supply to aid players of wind instruments in performing extended notes or passages. It was invented in 1912 by Bernard Samuels, a Dutch flautist in the Court Theatre of the Grand Duke of Mecklenburg-Schwerin.

== Design ==
The device consists of a small, foot-operated bellows that pumps air into the player's mouth via a rubber tube, which is fitted with a one-way valve to prevent the air from the player's lungs from passing into the bellows. The aerophor mouthpiece (a small metal reed) is mounted adjacent to the instrument mouthpiece such that the player may receive air through the corner of their mouth without disrupting the embouchure. In some models, the bellows contains a water reservoir and electric light bulb to ensure that the supplied air matches the temperature and humidity of the player's breath.

== Reception and utilisation ==
Some composers took advantage of the new invention, writing music that specifically requested the use of an aerophor in performance. Notable examples include Richard Strauss's An Alpine Symphony and Festival Prelude. However, the use case of the device was limited, and the use of circular breathing technique could allow a musician to accomplish the same goal of playing indefinitely without the need for a special apparatus. Boston Symphony tuba player Paul Mattersteig made use of the device for some time, including that orchestra's December 1914 performance of Wagner's Faust Overture, and Boston's first-chair horn Bruno Jaenicke and principal oboist Georges Longy "experimented with the device with much success." Despite a generally positive reception by professional wind players at the time, the aerophor never achieved widespread use, and today is regarded as nothing more than a curiosity.

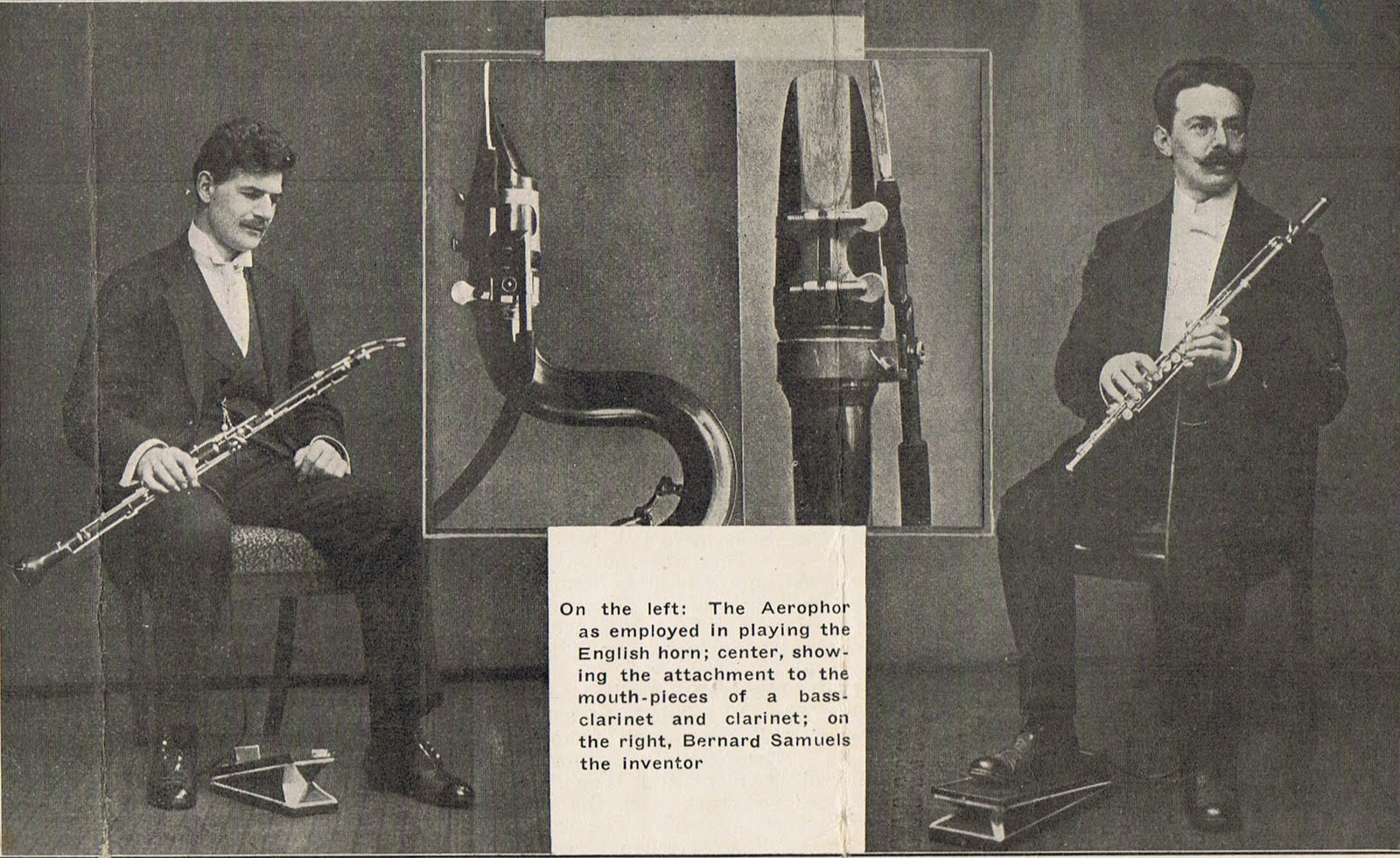
Woodwind players using aerophors, including inventor Bernard Samuels (right).
