= Des canyons aux étoiles... =

Orchestral work by Olivier Messiaen

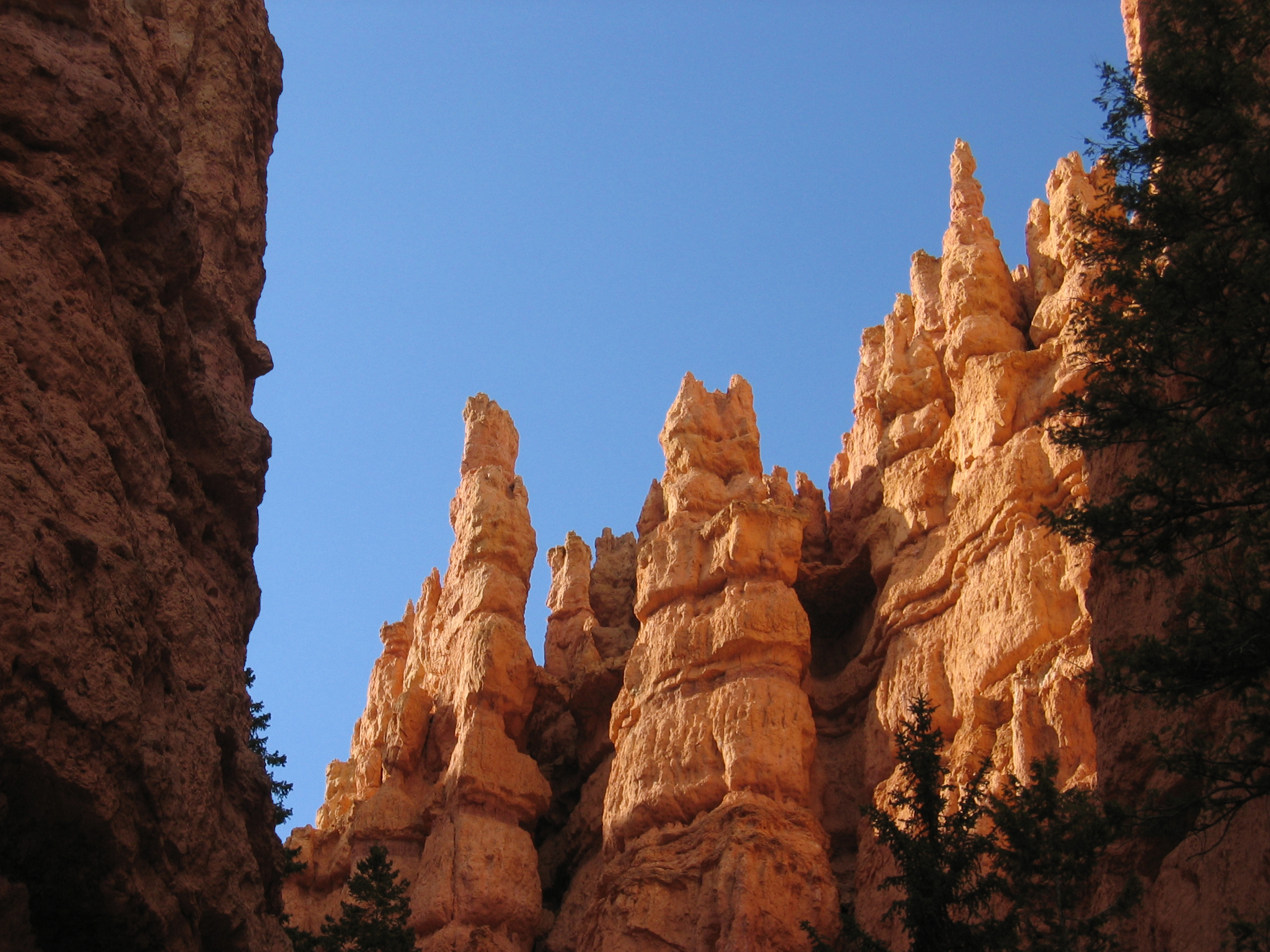
A view from Bryce Canyon

Des canyons aux étoiles... (From the canyons to the stars...) is a large twelve-movement orchestral work by the French composer Olivier Messiaen. American Alice Tully commissioned the piece in 1971 to celebrate the bicentenary of the United States Declaration of Independence in 1976.

While preparing the work in 1972, Messiaen visited Utah, where he was inspired by the birds and the landscape, particularly at colourful Bryce Canyon (Messiaen had sound-colour synaesthesia). It received its premiere in 1974. Performances of the work can have a duration in the range of 90 to 100 minutes.

The work is published by Éditions Alphonse Leduc.

== Instrumentation ==
The work is scored for four soloists (piano solo, horn solo, xylorimba solo and glockenspiel solo) and orchestra.

The string section consists of only 6 violins, 3 violas, 3 cellos, and 1 double bass with fifth-string lower extension.

The woodwind requires 1 piccolo, 2 flutes, 1 alto flute, 2 oboes, 1 cor anglais, 1 E-flat clarinet, 2 B-flat clarinets, 1 bass clarinet, 2 bassoons, and 1 contrabassoon.

In addition to the sixth movement's horn solo, the brass section also consists of 2 horns, 2 trumpets in c, 1 trumpet in d, 2 trombones, and 1 bass trombone.

The unusually large percussion section, divided for 5 percussionists, consists of Messiaen's own invented instrument the geophone, 1 wind machine, 1 thunder sheet, 1 gong, 1 set of tuned gongs, 1 set of tubular bells, 1 pair of maracas, 1 whip, 1 bass drum, 1 triangle, 1 wood block, 1 set of wooden wind chimes, 1 set of crotales, 1 reco reco, and 1 tumba, among other percussion instruments.

== Premieres ==
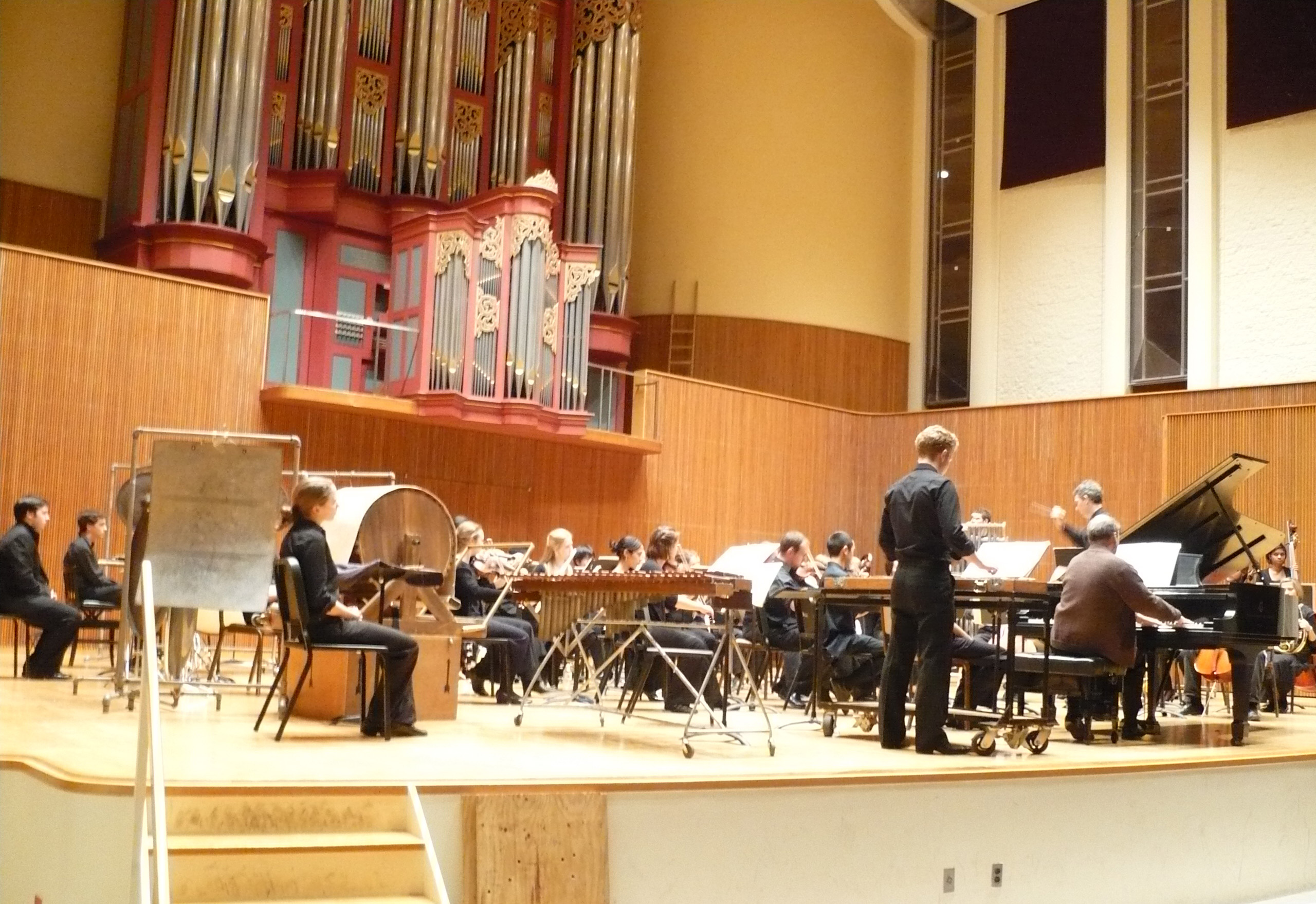
The 2008 Ohio premiere performance of Des canyons aux étoiles...; in Oberlin College. On the left can be seen some of the more unusual percussion instruments called for in the work, including a thunder sheet and wind machine.

The world premiere of this work took place on November 20, 1974, at Alice Tully Hall at Lincoln Center, with the Musica Aeterna Orchestra. The solo personnel for the premiere were:

- Conductor: Frederic Waldman
- Piano solo: Yvonne Loriod, wife of Messiaen who was the piano soloist in many performances of this work as well as Messiaen's other works.
- Horn solo: Sharon Moe

The French premiere occurred on 29 October 1975, at the Théâtre de la Ville in Paris, for the Autumn Festival of 1975. The orchestra was the Ensemble Ars Nova, directed by Marius Constant. The solo personnel were:

- Piano solo: Yvonne Loriod
- Horn solo: Georges Barboteu

== Structure ==
Messiaen specified that the work is in three sections: the first section contains movements 1–5, the second contains movements 6 and 7, and the third section contains movements 8–12. The movements are as follows:

Part 1:

1. "Le Désert" ("The desert")
2. "Les orioles" ("The orioles")
3. "Ce qui est écrit sur les étoiles" ("What is written in the stars")
4. "Le Cossyphe d'Heuglin" ("The white-browed robin-chat")
5. "Cedar Breaks et le don de crainte" ("Cedar Breaks and the gift of awe")

Part 2:

6. "Appel interstellaire" ("Interstellar call")
7. "Bryce Canyon et les rochers rouge-orange" ("Bryce Canyon and the red-orange rocks")

Part 3:

8. "Les Ressuscités et le chant de l'étoile Aldebaran" ("The resurrected and the song of the star Aldebaran")
9. "Le Moqueur polyglotte" ("The mockingbird")
10. "La Grive des bois" ("The wood thrush")
11. "Omao, leiothrix, elepaio, shama" ("ʻōmaʻo, leiothrix, ʻelepaio, shama")
12. "Zion Park et la cité céleste" ("Zion Park and the celestial city")

The piano is treated as a solo instrument throughout the work, with the fourth and ninth movements being extended piano cadenzas, while the sixth movement "Appel interstellaire" is for horn alone.

== Appel interstellaire ==
"Appel interstellaire" (Interstellar Call) was the first part of Des Canyons aux étoiles... that Messiaen composed. The title is followed by quotes:

C'est Lui qui guérit les cœurs brisés, et soigne leurs blessures; c'est Lui qui sait le nombre des étoiles, appelant chacune par son nom.

— (Psaume 146, v. 3 et 4) [Psalm 146]

Ô terre, ne couvre pas mon sang, et que mon cri ne trouve pas où se cacher!...

— (livre de Job, ch. 16, v. 18) [Book of Job]

It was originally composed for an entirely different purpose. In March 1971, the young French composer Jean-Pierre Guézec died, and his composer-friends contributed a collection of short pieces for solo instruments in his memory. For that collection, Messiaen wrote a brief movement for solo horn. He liked the piece well enough that when he began work on Des Canyons aux étoiles..., he adapted it for inclusion in the larger piece.

The music is extraordinarily difficult for the performer, who must master a range of techniques: flutter-tonguing, closed notes, glissandos, and faintly-sounded oscillations produced with the keys half-closed. "Appel interstellaire" begins with a strident call that might reach out across the universe, and between the various calls and extended techniques (and several long silences), the horn sings two lyric passages. Along the way we hear the calls of two birds—the Chinese thrush and the canyon wren—and at the end the music fades into silence on a recall of the faint oscillations.

It is increasingly performed as a solo, stand-alone piece by horn players in recitals although Messiaen himself did not wish it to be played separately.
