= Geophone (musical instrument) =

Percussion instrument

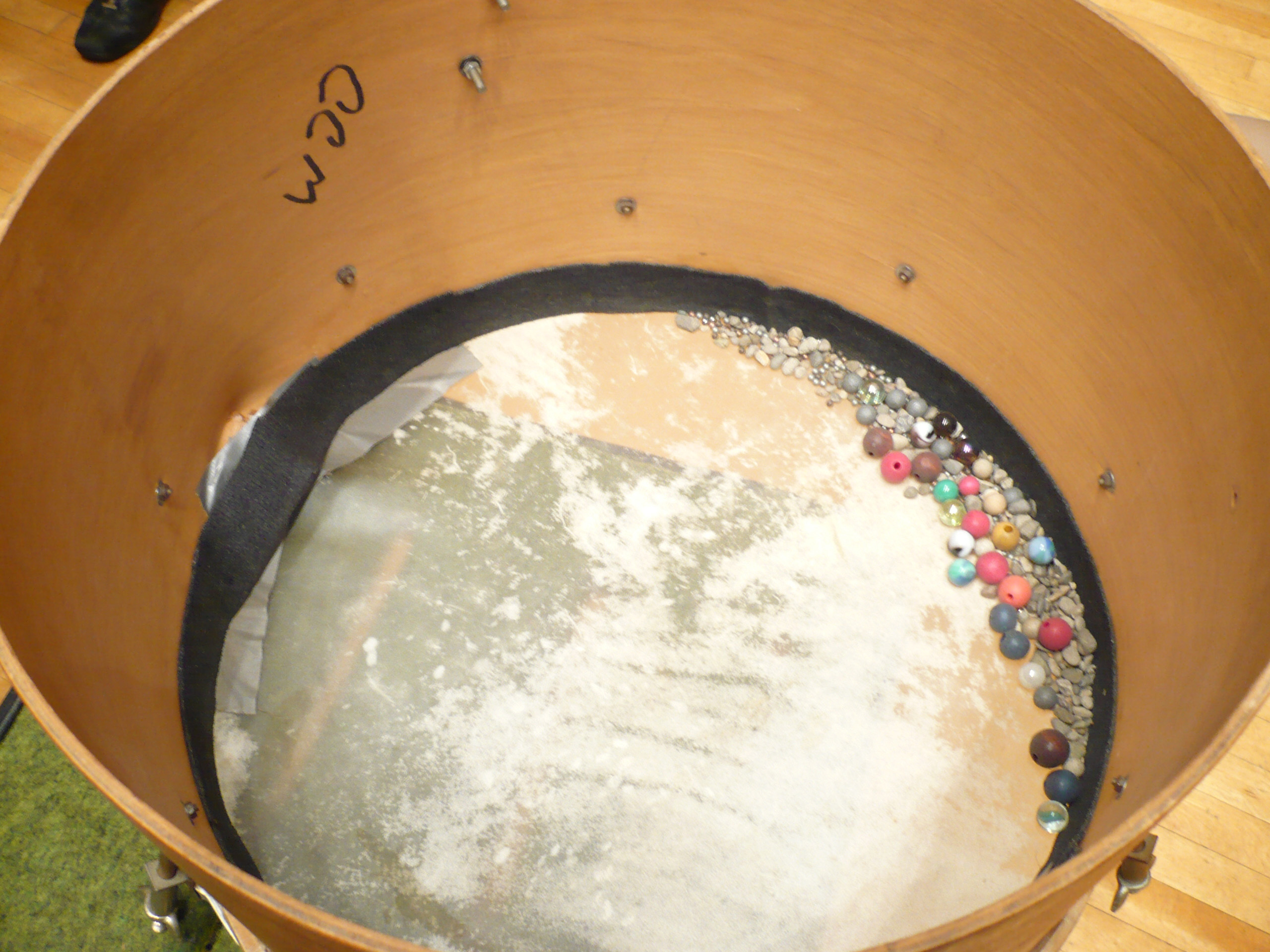
A geophone assembled for a 2008 performance of Olivier Messiaen's Des canyons aux étoiles... in Oberlin, Ohio

The geophone, now often known as the ocean drum is a percussion instrument, invented by the French composer Olivier Messiaen for use in his large composition for piano and orchestra entitled Des canyons aux étoiles… ("From the canyons to the stars…") and later appeared in his other works. It consists of a drum filled with thousands of small lead pellets, and is played by swirling it around slowly so that the noise of the pellets resembles the sound of dry shifting earth.

== History ==
Messiaen commissioned a Parisian instrument maker to construct one to his sketches, and he carried this instrument worldwide to early performances of the piece (which was given its first performance in New York City). Messiaen's wife, Yvonne Loriod, commented that when she and the composer first collected the new instrument from the maker in her car it made a "splendid crescendo" whenever they went around a corner.

It is now commonly known as the ocean drum.

== Pieces featuring the geophone ==
- Des canyons aux étoiles… by Messiaen
- Saint François d'Assise by Messiaen
- Asyla by Thomas Adès
- These Premises are Alarmed by Thomas Adès
- Five Spells from The Tempest by Thomas Adès
- …towards a pure land by Jonathan Harvey
- The Sacrifice by James MacMillan
- The Sinbadventurers by Benjamin Gordon, referred to in the score as ocean drums.
- Dark Sisters by Nico Muhly.
- The Compass by Liza Lim, also referred to in the score as ocean drums.
- Songs of Sailor and Sea by Robert W. Smith, referred to in the score as ocean drums.
