= Pléïades =

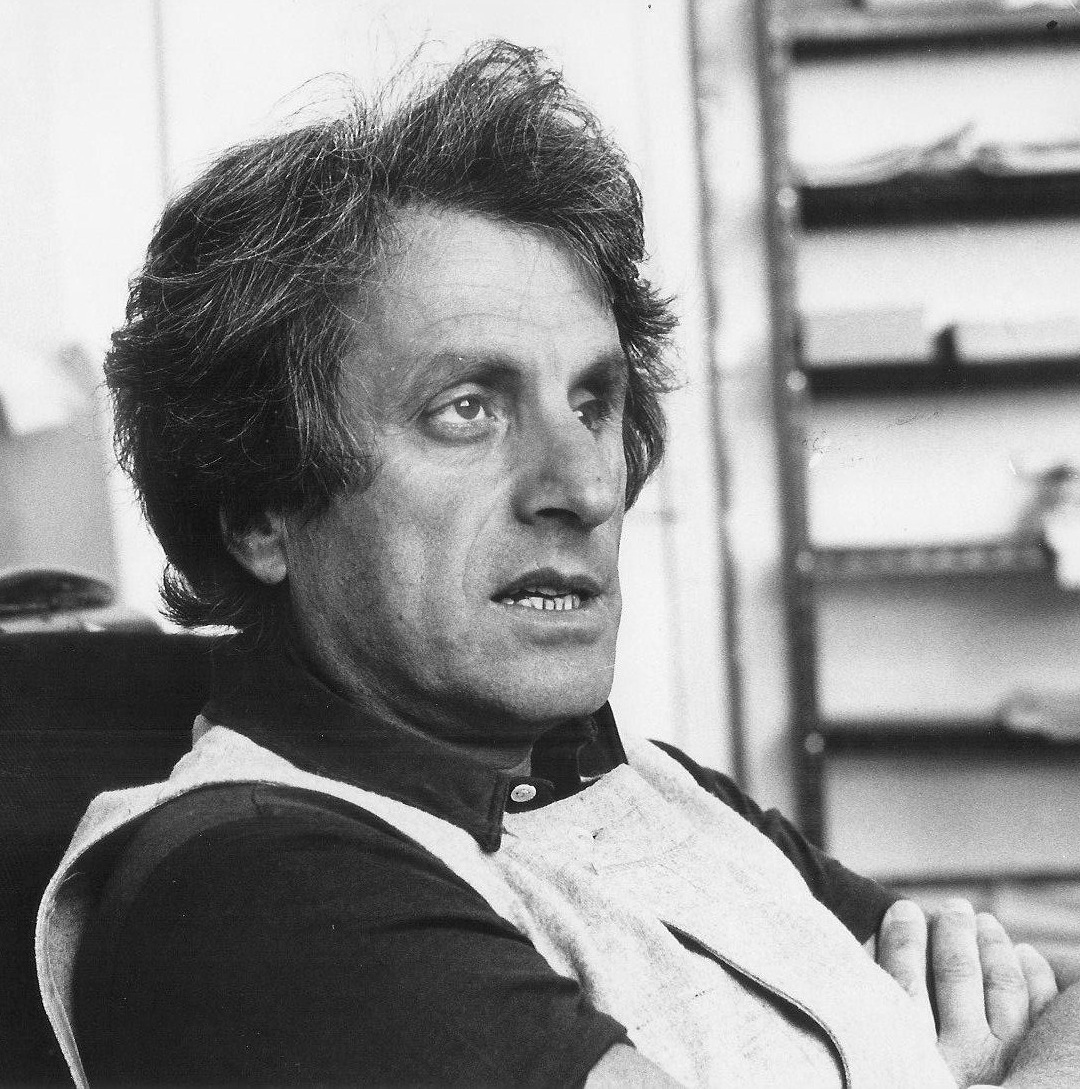
Iannis Xenakis in his Paris studio, c. 1970

Pléïades is a composition for six percussionists composed in 1979 by Greek composer Iannis Xenakis, originally commissioned by the percussion ensemble Les Percussions de Strasbourg. It is notable for its use of the sixxen, an instrument Xenakis constructed specifically for the piece.

== Title ==
The title of this work is intentionally ambiguous: on one hand, the term comes from a word meaning "many", and which alludes to all of the instruments used by the six percussionists along the four movements; on the other hand, it refers to a myth in Greek mythology: the Pleiades are the seven daughters of Pleione and Atlas even though the greatest part of his inspiration may come from the astronomy, as the Pleiades were thought to be the stars from Taurus.

== Structure and composition ==
The composition has four movements. Although Xenakis proposed two orders, there are many other recordings with different orders:

Order I (Xenakis):
1. Mélanges
2. Métaux
3. Claviers
4. Peaux
Order II (Xenakis):
1. Métaux
2. Claviers
3. Peaux
4. Mélanges
Order III (Salabert): (Note: First published version by Edition Salabert)
1. Claviers
2. Peaux
3. Metaux
4. Mélanges
Order III:
1. Métaux
2. Claviers
3. Mélanges
4. Peaux
Order IV:
1. Mélanges
2. Claviers
3. Métaux
4. Peaux

Three of the movements (Métaux, Claviers and Peaux) derive their names from specific instrumental types. In Métaux (French, "Metals"), all of the six instrumentalists play an instrument called sixxen (a blend between "six", named after the six musicians, and "xen", named after Xenakis), which is an instrument Xenakis had constructed specifically for this composition (they were made by the ensemble). The instrument in question consists of nineteen bars, of aluminum or bronze and steel, tuned microtonally (to an unequal 21-note scale built from 1/4 and 1/3 tones), laid out keyboard-style, and it is meant to be played with metal hammers. In Claviers (French: "Keyboards"), Xenakis uses vibraphones, marimbas, xylophones, and xylorimbas. In Peaux (French: "Skins"), only percussion instruments with skins are played (bongos, tom-toms, congas, timpani and bass drums). In Mélanges (French: "Mixtures"), the composer uses all of the sounds above mentioned.

== Notable recordings ==
Notable recordings of this composition include:

Ensemble	Conductor	Record Company	Year of Recording	Format
Kroumata Percussion Ensemble	Anders Loguin	BIS	1990	CD
Red Fish Blue Fish	n/a	Mode Records	2006	CD
