= Xylorimba =

Pitched percussion instrument

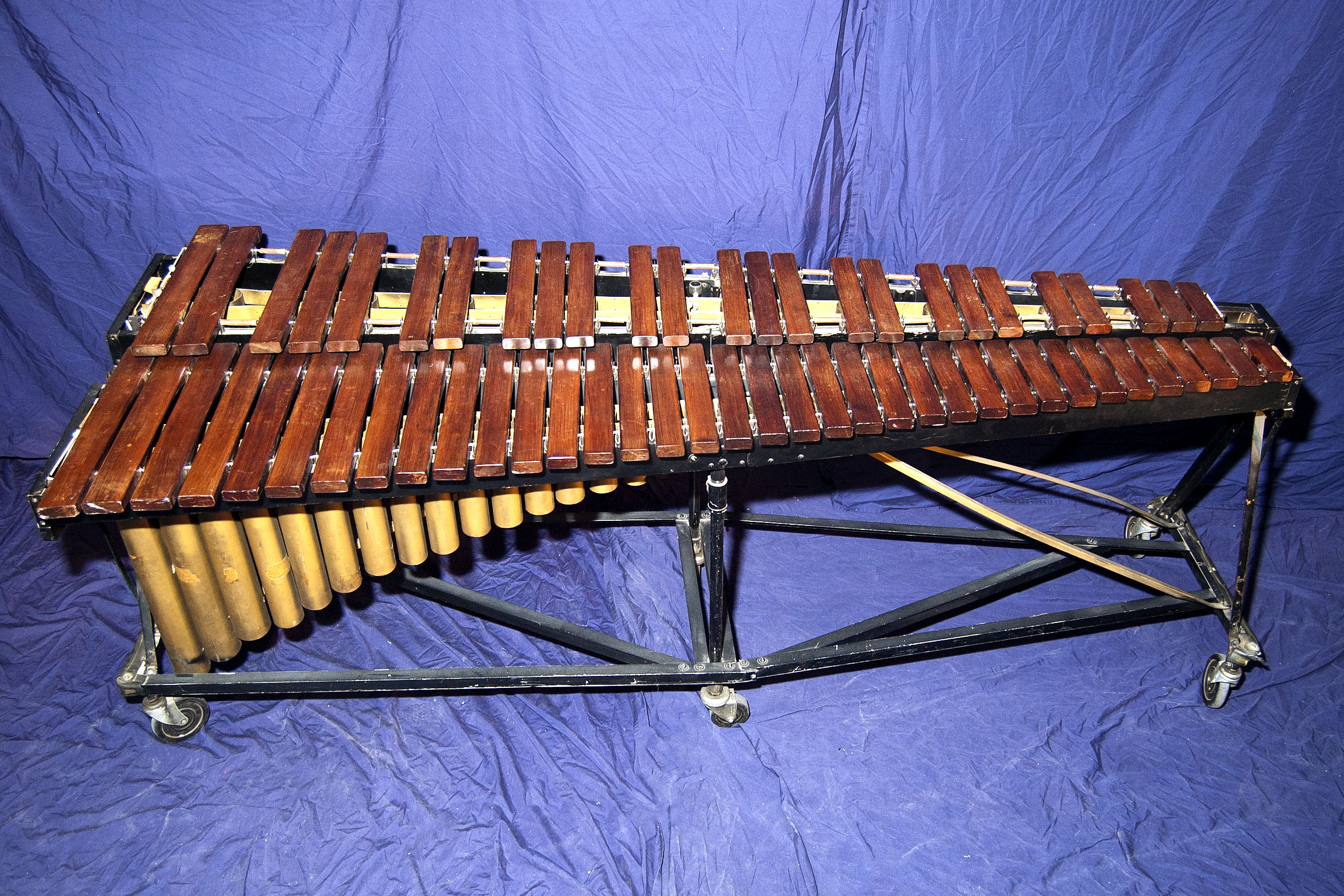
Xylorimba, range C3-C8

The xylorimba (sometimes referred to as xylo-marimba or marimba-xylophone) is a pitched percussion instrument similar to an extended-range xylophone with a range identical to some 5-octave celestas or 5-octave marimbas, though typically an octave higher than the latter. Despite its name, it is not a combination of a xylophone and a marimba; its name has been a source of confusion, as many composers have called for a 'xylorimba', including Alban Berg, Pierre Boulez and Olivier Messiaen, but for parts requiring only a four-octave xylophone. However, Pierre Boulez wrote for two five-octave xylorimbas in Pli selon pli.

Like the xylophone and marimba, the xylorimba consists of a series of wooden bars laid out like a piano keyboard "with a compass sufficiently large to embrace the low-sounding bars of the marimba and the highest-sounding bars of the xylophone." The lower notes of the xylorimba are described as sounding closer to a xylophone than a marimba, on account of its bars being both thicker and narrower, and due to the different size and shape of its resonators; the size and shape of the bars differs to emphasize different overtones.

The xylorimba experienced its greatest popularity in the 1920s and 30s, particularly within vaudeville theatre

== Compositions including xylorimba ==
(4, 4.5, and 5-octave instruments):

- Alban Berg: Three Pieces for Orchestra (1914–15, revised 1929)
- Erik Bergman: Hathor Suite for soprano, baritone, mixed chorus and ensemble (cor anglais, flute, harp and percussion) (1971)
- William Bolcom: Dream Music No. 2 for four players (1982)
- Pierre Boulez: Le Marteau sans maître for alto and six instruments (1953–55, revised 1957)
- Pierre Boulez: Pli selon pli for soprano and orchestra (1957–62)
- Roberto Gerhard: Symphony 3 (1961; world premiere)
- HK Gruber: Piano Concerto (2016; world premiere)
- Helmut Lachenmann: Mouvement (- vor der Erstarrung)) for three ad hoc players and 14 players (1982/84)
- Helmut Lachenmann: Souvenir for 41 instruments (1959)
- Helmut Lachenmann: Accanto for solo clarinet and orchestra (1975–76)
- Olivier Messiaen: Couleurs de la Cité Céleste for piano and chamber orchestra (1963)
- Olivier Messiaen: La Transfiguration de Notre Seigneur Jésus-Christ for mixed choir, seven solo instruments and large orchestra (1965–69)
- Olivier Messiaen: Des Canyons aux étoiles... for piano solo, horn, xylorimba, glockenspiel and orchestra (1971–74)
- Olivier Messiaen: Saint François d'Assise opera (1975–83)
- Olivier Messiaen: Éclairs sur l'au-delà… for large orchestra (1988–92)
- Krzysztof Penderecki: Strophen for soprano, voce recitante, and 10 instruments (1959)
- Carlos Stella: quartet: pastiches, parodies and variations on two themes by stravinsky and berio for piccolo clarinet, trombone, xylorimba and vibraphone (1995)
- Igor Stravinsky: The Flood: A musical play TV opera (1962)
- Karlheinz Stockhausen: Gruppen for three orchestras (1955–57) (in the list of instruments for Orchestra III, but the score itself calls for a marimbaphone, as in Orchestra I)
- Iannis Xenakis: Pléïades for percussion sextet (1978)
- The The: Introduction to the song "Uncertain Smile" (1982)
