= Saint François d'Assise =

Opera by Olivier Messiaen

- Opera by Olivier Messiaen
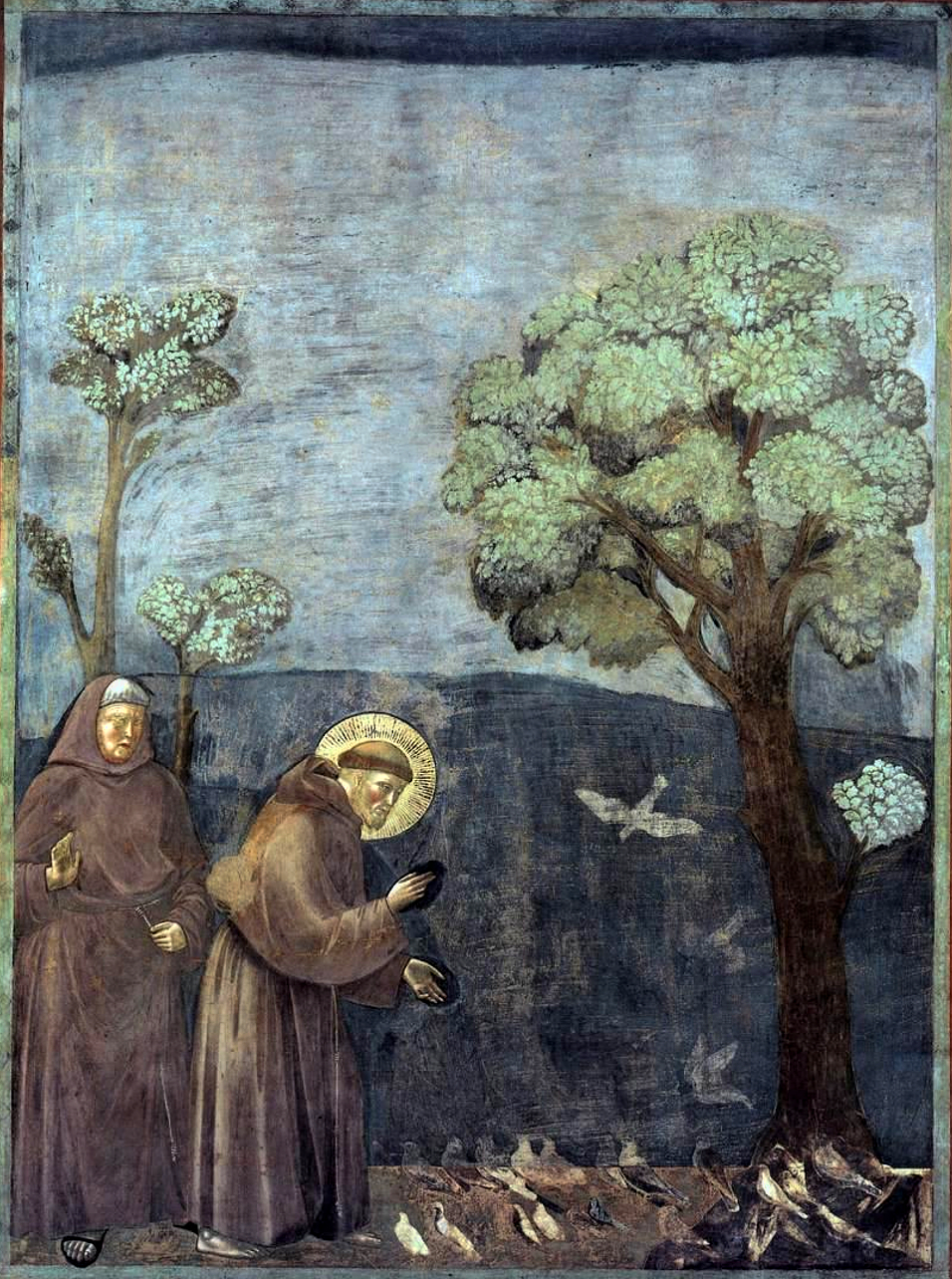
- Giotto: Legend of St Francis, Sermon to the Birds
- Librettist: Messiaen
- Language: French
- Based on: Francis of Assisi
- Premiere: 28 November 1983; Palais Garnier, Paris

Saint François d'Assise : Scènes Franciscaines (English: Franciscan Scenes of Saint Francis of Assisi), or simply Saint François d'Assise, is an opera in three acts and eight scenes by French composer Olivier Messiaen, who was also its librettist; written from 1975 to 1979, with orchestration and copying from 1979 to 1983. It concerns Saint Francis of Assisi, the titular character, and displays Messiaen's devout Catholicism.

The premiere was given by the Paris Opera at the Palais Garnier on 28 November 1983. The work was published eight years later in 1991. Messiaen's only opera, it is considered his magnum opus.

== Composition history ==
Despite his studies of Mozart and Wagner operas and his famous fascination with Debussy's Pelléas et Mélisande, Messiaen thought he would never compose an opera. When Rolf Liebermann, general manager of the Paris Opera, commissioned an opera from Messiaen in 1971 the composer refused. Messiaen changed his mind when Liebermann arranged that he be a guest at a dinner at the Elysée Palace, hosted by then French President Georges Pompidou; at the end of the dinner Pompidou said: "Messiaen, you will write an opera for the Opéra de Paris!". In searching for subject matter, Messiaen pondered dramatizing either Christ's Passion or his Resurrection. Feeling unworthy of either subject, he eventually chose to dramatize the life of Saint Francis of Assisi, which paralleled Christ's chastity, humility, poverty, and suffering. Messiaen commented that Francis's life "resembled Christ's life the most" and that Francis, like Christ, was "a friend of the birds".

The process of writing the opera took its toll on the composer. Initially, Messiaen made rapid progress as the opera became the sole object of his musical attention. In search of inspiration, he had traveled to Italy, where he examined paintings and frescoes and paid his respects at the Basilica of Saint Francis of Assisi.

By 1977, he contacted the general manager of the Paris National Opera to say he was ready to play through an unorchestrated version of the opera. Messiaen could not envisage orchestrating the opera by 1980. Adding to the pressure on Messiaen was a leak on the radio that he was writing an opera about Saint Francis. This revelation transgressed Messiaen's normal practice of secrecy when composing.

Messiaen appealed for a deadline extension in 1979. The new date was agreed to be 1983; however, Messiaen's health was beginning to deteriorate. In 1981 he had several periods of ill-health, and Messiaen once again doubted that he would finish according to plan. Messiaen began to suffer from depression, and by December 1981 he felt unable to go on. However, his doctor advised him to take daily walks to increase his well-being and he began to attend evening mass at the Sacre Coeur. This encouraged Messiaen to go on to complete the work. Completing it had left its mark on him, and he was convinced it would be his last composition.

=== Libretto ===
For maximum artistic freedom, Messiaen penned both libretto and score. For nearly eight years, the composer consulted Franciscan sources, reading biographies by Thomas of Celano and St. Bonaventure, as well as Francis' own prayers (including Canticle of the Sun). He also cited passages from the Fioretti, Considerations on the Stigmata and the Bible. The libretto is in French.

In order to focus on the progress of grace in Francis's soul after his conversion, Messiaen omitted certain episodes in Francis's life, including the often-romanticised relationship between Francis and St Clare, and the fable of his taming of a wild wolf at Gubbio.

Critics later chastised Messiaen for beginning the action after Francis's conversion. The composer defended his choice in an interview with Claude Samuel: "Some people have told me, 'There's no sin in your work.' But I myself feel sin isn't interesting, dirt isn't interesting. I prefer flowers. I left out sin."

The opera's eight scenes, divided into three acts, delineate Francis's spiritual development. Act One contains scenes in which he realizes his goals: "La Croix" (The Cross), "Les Laudes" (Lauds) and "Le Baiser au Lépreux" (The Kissing of the Leper). Act Two shows Francis's journey towards enlightenment, ministry, and divinity: "L'Ange voyageur" (The Journeying Angel), "L'Ange musicien" (The Angel Musician) and "Le Prêche aux oiseaux" (The Sermon to the Birds). The scenes of Act Three explore the saint's approach to divinity and his entrance into eternity: "Les Stigmates" (The Stigmata) and "La Mort et la Nouvelle Vie" (Death and the New Life).

== Performance history ==
After its 1983 premiere, Saint François was not staged for almost a decade. It was presented on stage again by the 1992 Salzburg Festival (at the Felsenreitschule), directed by Peter Sellars with Esa-Pekka Salonen conducting the Los Angeles Philharmonic. That production was revived in 1998, again at the Salzburg Festival. Productions followed at Oper Leipzig (1998) and at the Deutsche Oper Berlin (2002). The American premiere took place at the San Francisco Opera in 2002. Since then, the opera was presented in staged productions by the RuhrTriennale at the Jahrhunderthalle in Bochum in 2003 and in the Madrid Arena in Spain in 2011, by the Opéra National de Paris at the Opéra Bastille in 2004, by the Muziektheater in Amsterdam and in London in 2008, by the Bavarian State Opera in Munich in 2011 (directed by Hermann Nitsch), by Staatstheater Darmstadt (2018), and by the Vienna Philharmonic at the Salzburg Festival in 2026, directed by Romeo Castellucci.

== Roles ==
Role	Voice type	Premiere cast 28 November 1983 Conductor: Seiji Ozawa
Saint François (Saint Francis)	baritone	José van Dam
L'Ange (The Angel)	soprano	Christiane Eda-Pierre
Le Lépreux (The Leper)	tenor	Kenneth Riegel
Frère Léon (Brother Leo)	baritone	Philippe Duminy, Michel Philippe
Frère Massée (Brother Masseo)	tenor	Georges Gautier
Frère Elie (Brother Elias)	tenor	Michel Sénéchal
Frère Bernard (Brother Bernard)	bass	Jean-Philippe Courtis, Robert Grenier
Frère Sylvestre (Brother Sylvestro)	baritone	Lucien Dalmon
Frère Rufin (Brother Rufus)	baritone	Jean-Jacques Nadaud

== Synopsis ==
Place: Italy.
Time: 13th century.

The subject of each scene is borrowed from the Fioretti and the Reflexions on the Stigmata, books written by anonymous Franciscans of the 14th century. There are seven characters: Saint Francis, the Leper, the Angel, Brother Elias, and three Brothers especially beloved of Saint Francis—Brother Leo, Brother Masseo, and Brother Bernard. Throughout the work one can see the progress of grace in the soul of Saint Francis.

=== Act 1 ===
Scene 1: The Cross

After a short instrumental introduction, Saint Francis explains to Brother Leo that for the love of Christ he must patiently endure all contradictions, all suffering. This is the "Perfect joy."

Scene 2: Lauds

After the recitation of Matins by the Brothers, Saint Francis, remaining alone, prays that he might meet a leper and be capable of loving him.

Scene 3: The Kissing of the Leper

At a leper-hospital, a leper, horribly blood-stained and covered in pustules, rails against his disease. Saint Francis enters and, sitting close to him, speaks gently. An angel appears behind a window and says: "Leper, your heart accuses you, but God is greater than your heart." Troubled by the voice and by the goodness of Saint Francis, the leper is stricken with remorse. Saint Francis embraces him and, miraculously, the leper is cured and dances for joy. More important than the cure of the leper is the growth of grace in the soul of Saint Francis and his exultation at having triumphed over himself.

=== Act 2 ===
Scene 4: The Journeying Angel

On a forest road on La Verna an angel appears, disguised as a traveler. His knocking on the door of the monastery makes a terrific sound, symbolising the inrush of Grace. Brother Masseo opens the door. The Angel asks Brother Elias, the vicar of the Order, a question about predestination. Brother Elias refuses to answer and pushes the Angel outside. The Angel knocks on the door again and puts the same question to Brother Bernard, who replies with much wisdom. The Angel having gone, Brother Bernard and Brother Masseo look at each other, Bernard remarking, "Perhaps it was an angel..."

Scene 5: The Angel-Musician

The Angel appears to Saint Francis and, to give him a foretaste of celestial bliss, plays him a solo on his viol. This solo is so glorious that Francis swoons.

Scene 6: The Sermon to the Birds

Set at Assisi, at the Carceri, with a large green oak tree in spring with many birds singing. Saint Francis, followed by Brother Masseo, preaches a sermon to the birds and solemnly blesses them. The birds reply with a great chorus in which are heard not only birds of Umbria, especially the blackcap, but also birds of other countries, of distant lands, notably the Isle of Pines, close to New Caledonia.

=== Act 3 ===
Scene 7: The Stigmata

On La Verna at night in a cave beneath an overhanging rock, Saint Francis is alone. A great Cross appears. The voice of Christ, symbolized by a choir, is heard almost continuously. Five luminous beams dart from the Cross and successively strike the two hands, the two feet, and the right side of Saint Francis, with the same terrific sound that accompanied the Angel's knocking. These five wounds, which resemble the five wounds of Christ, are the divine confirmation of Saint Francis's holiness.

Scene 8: Death and the New Life

Saint Francis is dying, stretched out at full length on the ground. All the Brothers are around him. He bids farewell to all those he has loved, and sings the last verse of his Canticle of the Sun, the verse of "our sister bodily Death". The Brothers sing Psalm 141. The Angel and the Leper appear to Saint Francis to comfort him. Saint Francis utters his last words: "Lord! Music and poetry have led me to Thee [...] in default of Truth [...] dazzle me for ever by Thy excess of Truth..." He dies. Bells ring. Everything disappears. While the choir hymns the Resurrection, a patch of light illuminates the spot where the body of Saint Francis previously lay. The light increases until it becomes blinding; the choir altogether singing the word "joy". The curtain falls.

== Musical elements ==
Messiaen's wealth of experience as an orchestral composer manifests itself in Saint François d'Assise. In fact, Messiaen devotes a great majority of the opera's running time to orchestral music, though not to the detriment of character development. The composer reflects the characters' psychological and emotional state through the use of leitmotif and birdsong.

=== Leitmotif ===
Several leitmotifs exist in the orchestral score, most of which connect to one or more characters.

- Death (or "J'ai peur")

The dramatic action of the opera begins with the entrance of Brother Leo, who sings the "death" motif to words taken from the end of Ecclesiastes: "I am afraid on the road, when the windows grow larger and more obscure, and when the leaves of the poinsettia no longer turn red." "I am afraid on the road, when, about to die, the tiare flower is no longer perfumed. Behold! The invisible, the invisible is seen..." This theme repeats nearly every time Leo enters, and the orchestra accompanies it with lazy glissandos in the strings.

- Perfect Joy ("la joie parfaite")

Francis answers Leo's introspection with the "perfect joy" motif, a combination of Trumpet in D, xylophone and woodwinds. This motif reoccurs several times throughout the piece. In some cases, Brother Leo's "death" motif alternates with Francis' "perfect joy" motif.

- Solemnity

Messiaen linked Francis' moments of great solemnity with quite possibly the most pervasive motif of the opera. It is structured as a tone cluster in the trombone section, creating an ominous, harsh sound. The motif is quite evident in the second scene, wherein Francis asks God to let him meet a leper: "Fais-moi rencontrer un lépreux." The tone clusters break up his line of text: "Fais-moi"—cluster—"rencontrer"—cluster—"un lépreux."

- Grace

During Scene Four at La Verna, the Angel knocks on the monastery door. Messiaen represents the knocking with a motif heavy pounding sounds in the percussion and strings. He saw these knocks as an entry of grace—a force one must not resist. The Angel's knocking foreshadows Francis' eventual acceptance of the stigmata during Scene Seven. The main difference in Scene Seven is that the motif represents the painful, brutal pounding of nails into Christ's body.

=== Birdsong ===
Messiaen considered himself an ornithologist, and his love for birds is evident in the opera. The composer traveled to the saint's native Assisi, as well as New Caledonia, to research and record birdcalls of several local species, later transcribing them into melodies for use as musical themes attached to particular characters.

- François – Capinera (Italian for "Blackcap")

Upon entering caves at the Carceri (just east of Assisi), Messiaen heard the call of the capinera. Francis often retreated to these caves for meditation and prayer, thus the choice of the capinera is fitting.

- L'Ange – Gerygone

This yellow-bellied warbler from New Caledonia signals nearly every entrance and exit of the Angel. Messiaen scored the gerygone with a staccato piccolo alternating with glockenspiel and xylophone. In some cases, the kestrel birdcall accompanies the gerygone.

- Frère Elie – Notou

Francis' most contrarian brother, Elias, receives the birdcall of this "gloomy sounding pigeon" from New Caledonia.

- Frère Bernard – Philemon (or "friarbird")

The philemon birdcall (most likely recorded in New Caledonia) reflects Bernardo's age and wisdom while punctuating his musical and textual phrases.

Messiaen devotes the entire sixth scene ("La Prêche aux oiseaux" or, The Sermon to the Birds) to all manner of birdsong as Francis delivers his famous sermon with Brother Masseo in attendance.

=== Orchestra ===
Messiaen's full orchestration requires more than 110 musicians, placing great demands on budgets as well as orchestra pit space. At the Palais Garnier, the overflow of players were placed in boxes adjacent to the stage.

- Woodwinds: 3 piccolos, 3 flutes, 1 alto flute, 3 oboes, 1 English horn, 2 E♭ clarinets, 3 clarinets, 1 bass clarinet, 1 contrabass clarinet, 3 bassoons, 1 contrabassoon
- Brass: 6 horns in F, 1 small trumpet in D, 3 trumpets, 4 trombones, 2 bass tubas, 1 contrabass tuba
- Strings: 16 first violins, 16 second violins, 14 violas, 12 cellos and 10 double basses
- Percussion (5 players)

Player 1: 1 set of bells, 1 pair of claves, eoliphone, snare drum
Player 2: triangle, 1 pair of claves, 6 temple blocks, very small cymbal, small cymbal, suspended cymbal
Player 3: triangle, 1 pair of claves, wood block, whip, 1 pair of maracas,reco reco or guiro, 1 set of glass chimes, 1 set of shell chimes, 1 set of wood chimes, tambourine, 3 gongs
Player 4: triangle, 1 pair of claves, 1 set of crotales, large suspended cymbal, suspended cymbal, medium tom-tom, low tom-tom, 3 tam-tams
Player 5: 1 set of bells, metal sheet, 1 pair of claves, geophone, eoliphone, bass drum

In addition to these, pitched percussion instruments are also used: one xylophone, one xylorimba, one marimba, one glockenspiel and one vibraphone, as well as three Ondes Martenot which the composer described in his interview with Claude Samuel as being 'very rare in an opera!'.

=== Chorus ===
The opera requires a ten-part, 150-voice choir, which serves a twofold role: Greek chorus and divine presence. Throughout the piece, the chorus comments on Francis' spiritual journey. The first three scenes include a commentary on the preceding plot action with a "moral." For example, after Francis' conversation with Leo on "perfect joy", the chorus sings the text "He who would walk in my steps, let him renounce himself, take up his Cross and follow me." One could say that this text carries a double purpose—the moral is not only sung, but comes from the mouth of Christ. In the latter scenes of the opera, especially The Stigmata, the chorus perpetuates its image as Christ speaking directly to Francis as He bestows the wounds onto the saint. Messiaen's choral writing, especially the violent, wordless chants during The Stigmata, suggests a mystical, otherworldly presence.

=== Color ===
Messiaen's synesthesia caused a perception of colors associated with particular harmonies or musical scale degrees. For instance, when hearing a C-natural on the piano, the composer saw "white" before his eyes. In the opera, Messiaen underscores the final moments (Francis' death and ascent into heaven) on a C major chord structure, providing a musical burst of white light. It is unclear whether this final chord structure was coincidental or intentional.

== Messiaen's other research ==
Messiaen traveled to Italy not merely for birdcall research. In Assisi, he visited the Basilica of Saint Francis to study the Giotto frescoes. During rehearsal for the premiere production, the composer coached baritone José van Dam (creator of the title role) in some of the gestures and attitudes evoked on the Giotto masterpieces. Messiaen also made a side trip to Florence. While in the monastery of San Marco, he found inspiration for the Angel's costume in one of several paintings of the Annunciation by Fra Angelico. As a result, the libretto includes a costume note on the exact shade of the Angel's robe (as dictated by the original artwork): a pinkish mauve between lilac and salmon.

== Recordings and broadcasts ==
Four recordings of the opera exist, three of which are complete:

- Ozawa (1983): Conductor Seiji Ozawa recorded the world premiere production with the orchestra and chorus of the Théâtre national de l'Opéra de Paris. Cast members included José van Dam in the title role with soprano Christiane Eda-Pierre as the Angel. Released on the Cybélia label (then Assai Classics), this was the first complete recording of the opera.
- Zagrosek (1985): The Salzburg Festival of 1985 included concert performances scenes 3, 6, 7 and 8 only of the opera under the baton of Lothar Zagrosek, with the Vienna Radio Symphony Orchestra and the Arnold Schoenberg Chor. Baritone Dietrich Fischer-Dieskau sang the title role with French soprano Rachel Yakar as the Angel. The recording was released on the Orfeo d'Or label.
- Nagano (1986): Kent Nagano, who had studied the original 1983 production, conducted a concert performance in Utrecht for release on the KRO label. Philippe Rouillon sang the title role.
- Nagano (1998): Nagano also helmed this complete live recording with the Hallé Orchestra and Arnold Schoenberg Choir at the Salzburg Festival in 1998 for release on Deutsche Grammophon. José van Dam returned to sing the title role. American soprano Dawn Upshaw sang the Angel, with Chris Merritt as the Leper.

The opera was given a semi-staged performance as Prom 70 in the 2008 BBC Proms season and broadcast live on BBC Radio 3. This was based on the recent production by Netherlands Opera. This production was filmed and issued on a three-DVD set in 2009, with Rodney Gilfry as St. Francis and Camilla Tilling as the Angel. The conductor is Ingo Metzmacher, and the stage director is Pierre Audi.
