= Frank Shipway =

British conductor

Frank Edwin Shipway (9 July 1935 – 6 August 2014) was a British conductor.

== Early life ==
Shipway was born in 1935 in Birmingham. He studied piano first with his father and then with Alisa Verity. He earned a scholarship to The Royal College of Music to study piano and later switched to conducting. Shipway was further trained by John Barbirolli and attended masterclasses with Herbert von Karajan, modelling his style after Karajan's own.

== Career ==
In 1963, Shipway became music director of the South-West Essex Symphony Orchestra, soon renamed the Forest Philharmonic Society (FPS), which he would lead until 1991. His first professional conducting position was with the Berlin Opera in 1973 as assistant conductor to Lorin Maazel. He also worked with the Glyndebourne Festival Opera and the English National Opera in this period and developed an operatic repertoire largely from the Classical and Romantic periods.

In 1991, Shipway formed the Orchestra Sinfonica Nazionale della RAI in Italy and served as its chief conductor for four years. From 1996 to 1999 he was chief conductor and artistic director of BRT Philharmonic Orchestra in Brussels, and then of the Zagreb Philharmonic Orchestra. He also served as guest conductor with the Cleveland Orchestra, Teatro alla Scala Orchestra, and the Moscow, Helsinki and Royal Stockholm Philharmonic Orchestras.

For several years prior to his death, Shipway was a frequent guest conductor with the São Paulo State Symphony; he made two recordings with the orchestra for BIS Records and was considered for the post of musical director upon the departure of John Neschling. In addition to conducting, Shipway gave masterclasses and served on the juries of a number of international competitions including the Nikolai Malko and Arturo Toscanini conducting competitions.

Shipway died on 6 August 2014 of injuries sustained in a car accident in Wedhampton, Wiltshire, England. He was 79.

== Selected discography ==
Shipway's only recordings were made with the Royal Philharmonic Orchestra and the São Paulo State Symphony. His recordings of Gustav Mahler's Symphony No. 5 and Dmitri Shostakovich's Symphony No. 10 are particularly well regarded.

- Mahler: Symphony No. 5 in C-sharp minor – Royal Philharmonic Orchestra (RPO Records 204494-201)
- Shostakovich: Symphony No. 10 in E minor – Royal Philharmonic Orchestra (Tring TRP080)
- Strauss: An Alpine Symphony – São Paulo State Symphony Orchestra (BIS-1950)
- Tchaikovsky: Symphony No. 5 in E minor, The Voyevoda – Royal Philharmonic Orchestra (Royal Philharmonic Masterworks 29220)
- Walton/Hindemith: Cello Concertos – São Paulo State Symphony Orchestra/Christian Poltéra (BIS-2077)

The Strauss recording was a finalist for BBC Music Magazine's Best Orchestral Recording of 2014.
