= Frederic Waldman =

Austrian-born American conductor (1903–1995)

Frederic Waldman (April 17, 1903, Vienna — December 1, 1995, Manhattan) was an Austrian conductor, pianist, and music educator. He taught on the faculty of the Juilliard School from 1947 to 1967, and was also the music director of the Juilliard Opera Theater from the early 1950s until 1985. He founded the Musica Aeterna Orchestra in 1957; an ensemble he remained director of until his retirement in 1985. Music critic Allan Kozinn described Waldman in The New York Times as "a powerful presence on the New York music scene" and as "an enterprising conductor who for more than 30 years presented programs of forgotten works by great composers of the past as well as premieres of contemporary works".
