= Wind machine =

Type of musical instrument

A video of a wind machine in use

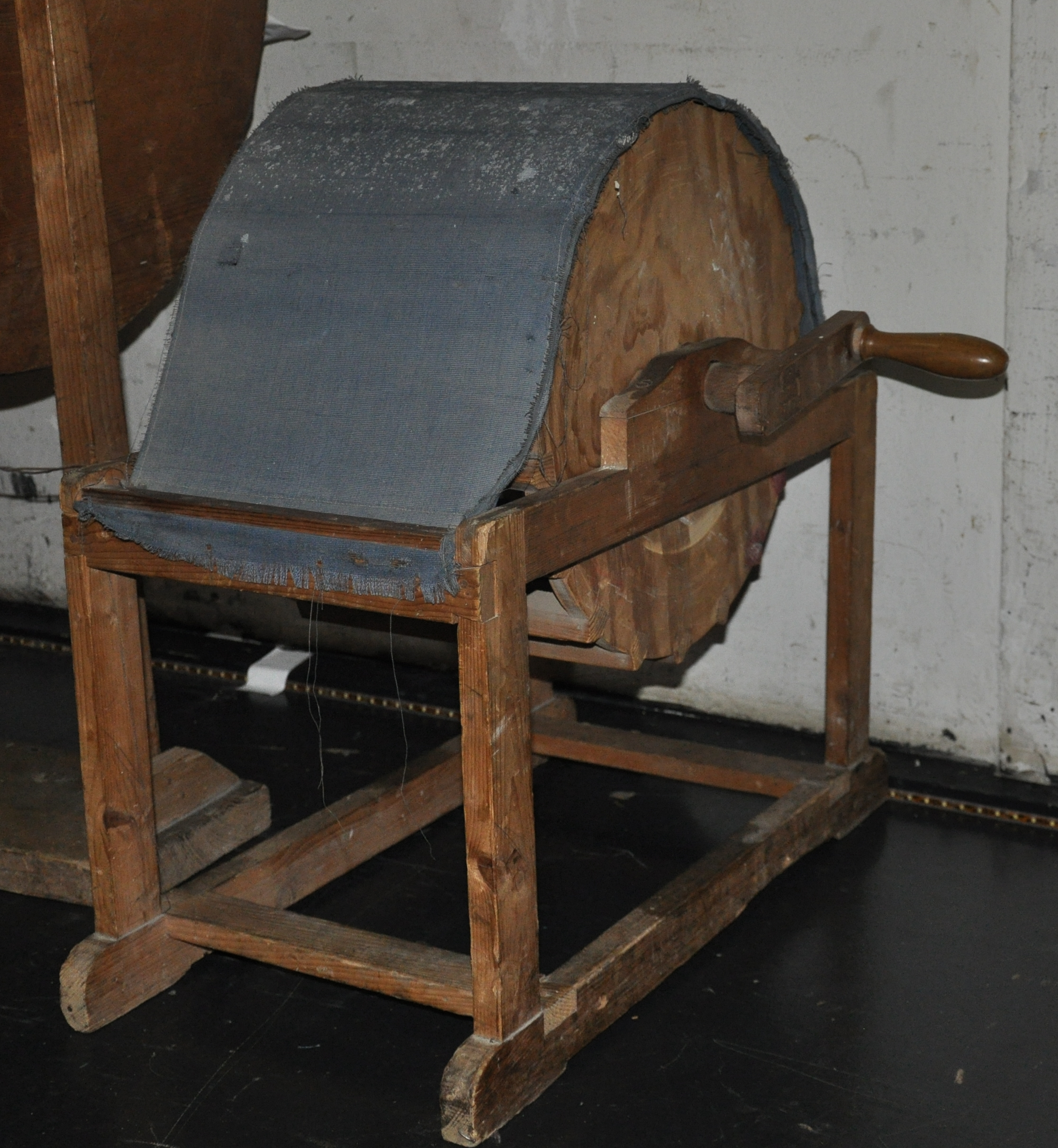
A historical wind machine (c. 1900) at the Konzerthaus in Ravensburg, Germany

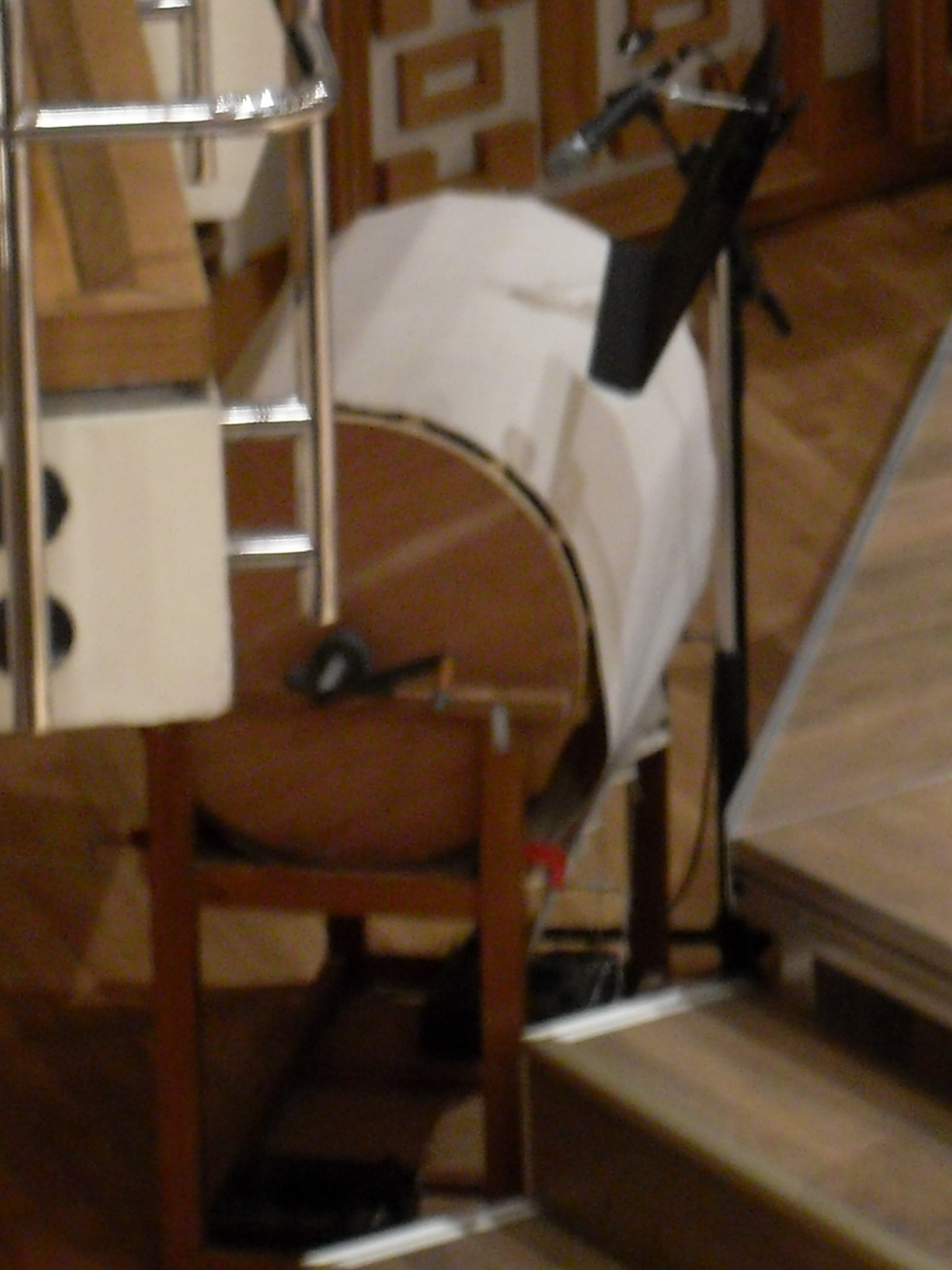
A modern wind machine during the performance of Vaughan Williams's Sinfonia antartica by Hong Kong Philharmonic Orchestra

The wind machine (also called an aeoliphone or aelophon) is a friction idiophone used to produce the sound of wind for orchestral compositions and musical theater productions.

== Construction ==
The wind machine is constructed of a large cylinder made up of several wooden slats which measures approximately 75–80 cm (30–31 in) in diameter. The cylinder body of the instrument rests upon a stand and is typically covered with silk, canvas, or other material which is in a fixed position. A crank handle, used by the player to rotate the cylinder and create the sound, is attached to the cylinder.

Another method of construction implements an electric fan, which is fitted with lengths of cane, rather than blades. However, this method is less popular because it does not provide the player with the ability to control the speed of rotation.

== Technique ==
The wind machine is played by rotating the crank handle, which is attached to the cylinder, to create friction between the wooden slats and the material covering that touches the cylinder but does not rotate as the crank handle is turned. This friction between the wood and the material covering creates the sound of rushing wind. The volume and pitch of the sound is controlled by the rate at which the crank is turned. The faster the handle is turned, the higher the resulting pitch and the louder the sound. The slower the handle is turned, the lower the pitch and the softer the volume. The sound of the wind machine can also be controlled by the tightness of the fabric covering the cylinder.

== Selected works that use the wind machine ==
- Les Boréades by Rameau
- Amériques by Edgard Varèse
- Atlantida by Manuel de Falla
- Bluebeard's Castle by Béla Bartók
- Daphnis et Chloé by Maurice Ravel
- Des canyons aux étoiles… by Olivier Messiaen
- Die Jakobsleiter by Arnold Schoenberg
- Don Quixote and An Alpine Symphony by Richard Strauss
- Grand Canyon Suite by Ferde Grofé
- Les choëphores by Darius Milhaud
- Sinfonia antartica by Ralph Vaughan Williams
