= Alexis Galpérine =

French classical violinist (born 1955)

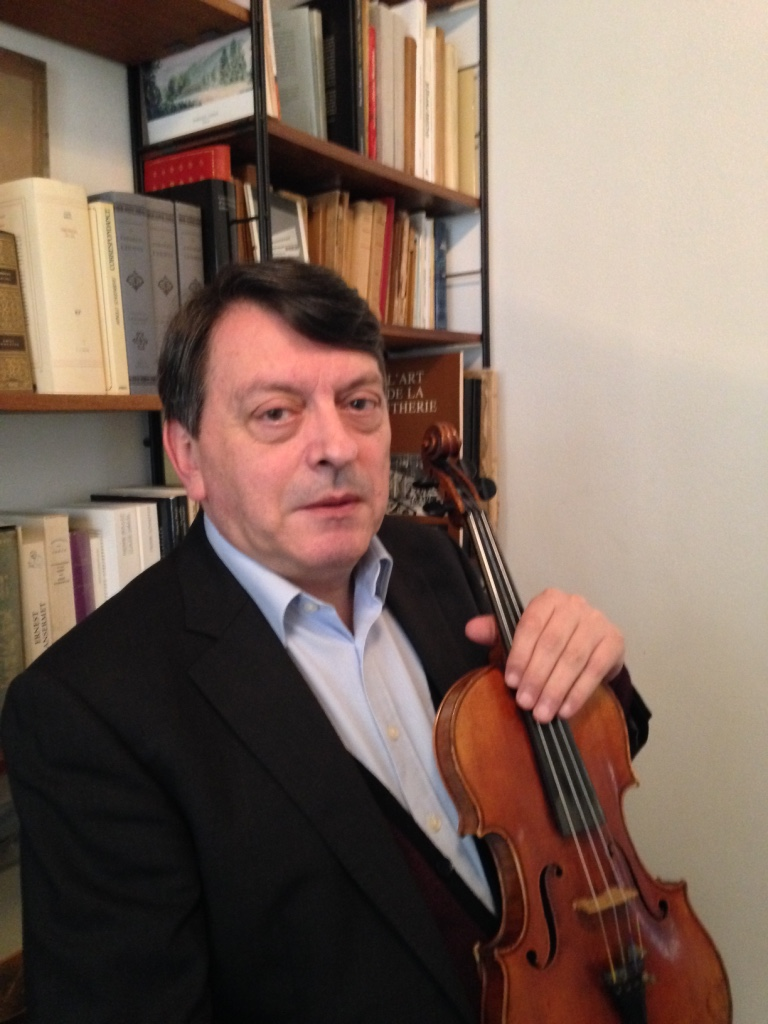
- Alexis Galpérine in 2016

Background information
- Born: 1955 (age 70–71); Paris, France
- Genre: Classical
- Occupations: Violinist, Academic, Author
- Instrument: Violin
- Labels: Timpani, Naxos, Forgotten Records

Alexis Galpérine (born 1955) is a French classical violinist.

== Career ==
Born in Paris, Galpérine studied at the Conservatoire de Paris and the Juilliard School in New York. His principal masters were Roland Charmy, Ivan Galamian and Henryk Szeryng. He was laureate of the "Carl Flesch" (London) and "Paganini" (Genoa) competitions and First Prize in the Belgrade Competition. Winner of the Georges Enesco competition of the SACEM, he also holds a degree in philosophy from the Sorbonne.

Galpérine was a soloist for the Orchestre Lamoureux, the Orchestre Mondial des Jeunesses Musicales, the Monte-Carlo Philharmonic Orchestra, the Sofia soloists, the American Chamber Orchestra and chamber orchestras from Belgrade, Tuscany, Bratislava, Cologne etc. He played notably under the direction of Manuel Rosenthal, Michel Tabachnik, Antoni Ros-Marbà, Bruno Mantovani, Paul Méfano, Charles Groves, Francesco Molinari-Pradelli, Marcello Viotti, Patrice Fontanarosa, Pierre Roullier, Philippe Bernol etc.

As a chamber musician, he performed at the Library of Congress Summer Festival of Washington D.C., Musicades de Lyon, the Festival des Arcs, the Nancyphonies, at the Asolo, Siena and Cremona festivals, and in the Radio France concert series. He is a founding member of the American Chamber Players an ensemble that was ten years in residence at the Library of Congress. He has given hundreds of concerts for chamber music societies in the United States and Canada. In France, he is a permanent guest artist of the Ensemble Stanislas de Nancy.

Galpérine has premiered more than a hundred works, notably with the ensembles 2e2m and Musicavanti. He is the dedicatee of Paul Méfano's Alone, Laurent Martin's Légendes (concerto for violin, wind and choir), Yassen Vodenitcharov's concerto, Frédérik Martin's and Roger Boutry's sonatas, Olivier Greif's Adagio, Carlos Roqué Alsina's Belgirate, and Édouard Souberbielle's quartet, among others.

Cinema called on him and he composed stage music (for Coline Serreau, Benno Besson).

An academic at the Conservatoire de Paris (violin and pedagogy) and the American Conservatory of Fontainebleau, he sits on the juries of international competitions (president of the Ginette Neveu competition in 2013) and gives masterclasses in France and abroad. He was notably invited at the Indiana University Bloomington.

Galpérine is the author of books and musicological articles. He is a member of the editorial board of "La Revue du Conservatoire", president of the Association française des violonistes ("L'Amirésol") and director of the violin collection of Éditions Delatour-France. Since 2017, he has been Honorary President of the Rencontres Musicales du Plateau d'Assy.

== Private life ==
Galpérine is the husband of the writer and lawyer Élise Galpérine.

== Discography ==
- Sonates de Vincent d'Indy et de Louis Vierne. AG et François Kerdoncuff, Timpani 1c1002
- Réédition, sonates de d'Indy pour violon et pour violoncelle, with AG, François Kerdoncuff, Yvan Chiffoleau and Olivier Gardon, Timpani Naxos 1D1187
- Beethoven, Dvorak, Septuor opus 20 and Miniatures opus 75a, with l'Ensemble Stanislas, Forgotten Records fr 983
- Igor Stravinsky, Musique de chambre, avec les Florence Gould Chamber Players (String quartets and Concertino with A G, Annick Roussin, Pierre-Henri Xuereb and Philippe Müller), 3D, 3D8009.
- Hanns Eisler, Septuors 1 et 2, Kurt Weill, Sept pièces tirées de L'Opéra de Quat'sous (arr. Frenkel), Schönberg, Musique de Noël and La Brigade de Fer, with Jeff Cohen and l'Ensemble Stanislas. GALLO, CD676, 9 de Répertoire
- Ernest Bloch, Les deux sonates pour violon et piano, Alexis Galpérine and Frédéric Aguessy. ADDA 581044.
- Olivier Greif's Les Lettres de Westerbork, Doris Lamprecht, Alexis Galpérine and Eric Crambes (plus Les Chants de L'âme with Jennifer Smith and Olivier Greif), Triton, tri331101
- Schubert, Octuor, Mahler, Adagietto de la 5e symphonie, arr. pour septuor à cordes de Philippe Capdenat (premiere), with the Ensemble Stanislas, Forgotten Records fr009
- Otto Albert Tichý' Chamber music, Alexis Galpérine, Gérard Fallour, Stanislas Quartet, Nostitz Quartet etc. GALLO CD1111
- Récital, violon seul aux "Nancyphonies" : Viotti, Duetto a un violino solo, Bach, Chaconne, Ysaÿe, Sonate 6, Paganini, Variations "Nel cor piu non mi sento...", Méfano, Alone (à AG). Forgotten Records 1361
- Laurent Martin, Tranquillo barbaro for violin and instrumental ensemble, plus other pieces... With the Ensemble 2e2m, dir. Paul Méfano. Assai 222192.
- Brahms, Trio op.87, with Geneviève Joy and Jean de Spengler (plus Shostakovitch, Concerto, and Bartok, Sonate pour deux pianos et perc, with Geneviève Joy, Louis de Froment and Jacqueline Bonneau). Forgotten Records, fr 1353
- Maurice Emmanuel, Musique de chambre. Suite sur des airs populaires grecs with Laurent Wagschal, Timpani1c1167
- Joseph-Guy Ropartz, Musique de chambre, Trio with Jean-Louis Haguenauer and Cécilia Tsan, Timpani 1c1047.
- Réédition 1c1118, plus Trio à cordes, Prélude, marine et chansons by the Ensemble Stanislas
- Johann Strauss, Valses, versions Schönberg, Berg and Webern, with Jean-Louis Haguenauer and the Ensemble Stanislas, GALLO cd-892
- Schumann, Quintette, with Hugh Wolff, Junko Ohtsu, Miles Hoffman, Carter Brey. Library of Congress, Washington D.C., Summer Chamber Festival, LCM2129
- Jacques Chailley's Musiques pour cordes. Sonate pour violon seul (dedicated to Alexis Galpérine, premiere), duo pour violon et alto (with Marie-Thérèse Chailley), with the Enesco Quartet, Sylvette Milliot etc. REM 311101
- Louis Vierne, Intégrale de la musique de chambre, Timpani, with Yvan Chiffoleau, Olivier Gardon, Phillips Quartet etc., double cd 2C2019, réédition 2C2098.
- Wilhelm Furtwängler, Deuxième sonate pour violon et piano, Alexis Galpérine and François Kerdoncuff, French premiere, Timpani 1C1001
- Wilhelm Furtwängler, Intégrale de la musique de chambre, with François Kerdoncuff, Dong-Suk Kang, Sine Nomine Quartet... Timpani 3C1092
- Carl Maria von Weber's Variations concertantes pour piano et violon sur un air norvégien, quatuor avec piano opus 8, with Jean-Louis Haguenauer, Pierre-Henri Xuereb, Cécilia Tsan... Timpani 1C1007
- Paul Ben-Haim, Mélodies, with Varda Kotler and Jeff Cohen. ARION 68643i
- Jean-Jacques Werner, Elégie for violin (premiere), and other pièces... Forgotten Records fr 38w
- Ernest Bloch, Deux quintettes pour piano et cordes with the American Chamber Players (piano: Lambert Orkis and Ann Schein), chamber music from the Library of Congress, KOCH, International Classics 3-7041-2 H1 CD et K7
- Xu Yi, Wang, with the Ensemble 2e2m, MFA216032
- Yassen Vodenitcharov's Concerto pour violon (dedicated to Alexis Galpérine, premiere); with the Ensemble 2e2m, dir. Pierre Roullier, GEGA (Sofia) GD350
- Olivier Messiaen's Quatuor pour la fin du temps; Summer Chamber Festival of the Library of Congress, Washington D.C.: Hugh Wolff, Alexis Galpérine, Loren Kitt, Carter Brey. LCM2129
- Roger Boutry's Sonate pour violon et piano (dedicated to Alexis Galpérine), sonate pour violon seul, Songe d'Urashima, Croquis (créations), avec Roger Boutry. L'Algarade cc87470
- Joseph-Guy Ropartz' Sonates 1 and 2, Alexis Galpérine and Jean-Louis Haguenauer.
- André David, Images. Françoise Levéchin, Jean-Jacques Werner etc. Monisme (dedicated Alexis Galpérine) and Charles Chaynes' Autour d'une mélopée (in memoriam André David), créations pour violon seul. MARCAL classics 120501
- André David, Monisme, Delatour-France, dlt 1400
- Récital, pieces by Paganini, Paradies, Schubert, Brahms, Dvorak, Bazzini, Elgar, Kreisler, Sarasate, Fauré, Rimsky-Korsakov, Debussy, Falla, Rachmaninov... Alexis Galpérine and Gérard Fallour.
- René Herbin's Quatuor avec piano, Florent Schmitt's Quatuor "Les Hasards" and Légende (violon version), with Elisabeth Herbin, Bruno Pasquier, Mark Drobinsky. GALLO CD-711.
- Igor Stravinsky's chamber music with The American Chamber Players. Pièces pour violon et piano with Alexis Galpérine and Ann Schein. Koch International Classics 3-7078-2 H1 CD et K7
- Fernand Halphen, Musique de chambre, mélodies... With Jeff Cohen, François Le Roux, Sonia Wieder-Atherton... Fondation du Judaïsme Français. Buda Musique, Socadisc SC 881. CD double.
- Nadia and Lili Boulanger's Lux aeterna, Pie Jesu, Noël Lee's Vers libres pour violon seul (to AG, création), David Conte Requiem Songs, premiere, Alain, Messiaen... Concert en l'église de la Trinité à Paris, with Magali Léger, Carolyn Shuster, Saori Kikuchi... TAMOS 05392013
- Pierre Belfond's Œuvres pour violon, piano and organ. Alexis Galpérine, Pierre Belfond and Claude Helffer (premieres). Forgotten Records fr258
- Roger Boutry's Eurythmie, Galpérine, Roger Boutry, Kunazawa Orchestra dir. Inoue etc. L'Algarade CC874753
- Eugène Ysaÿe's Sonata for two violins, with Marie-Thérèse Ibos, plus quatuor de Richard Strauss par l'Ensemble Marie-Thérèse Ibos, Forgotten Records 1064
- Carlos Roqué Alsina's chamber music. Belgirate pour violon seul (dedicated to Alexis Galpérine), Tan Tango avec Juan José Mosalini, et David Simpson, Ens. Musicavanti (créations) etc. MUS20114/2/1
- Franz Schreker, Der Wind, Paul Hindemith, Octuor, Ferenc Farkas, La Cour du Roi Mathias. Avec l'Ensemble Stanislas. Forgotten Records 1294
- Lionel Polard-Cohen, Les clameurs de l'ombre pour violon seul (dédié à Alexis Galpérine, création), plus Itinéraire Formantique (IRCAM). Forgotten Records 26PC
- Georges Martin Witkowski, Sonate pour violon et piano. Alexis Galpérine et Hugues Leclère. Le Parnasse Français CD001
- Paul Méfano, Alone pour violon seul (dédié à Alexis Galpérine, création). Inséré dans le livre Paul Méfano, témoignages et entretiens. Inactuelles-Les Belles Lettres. "Coup de cœur" Académie Charles Cros
- Darius Milhaud, Le Boeuf sur le Toit, transcription pour violon solo, percussions et dixtuor par Alexis Galpérine, sur une idée de Madeleine Milhaud (création); Martinu, Nonette; Auric, Suite Malbrough s'en va t'en guerre; Richard Strauss-Hasenöhrl, Till Eulenspiegel, Einmal Anders! Avec l'Ensemble Stanislas. Forgotten Records, 1277
- Youli Galpérine, La Rose de Jéricho. Concert salle Cortot décembre 2014. La Partie espagnole (première audition parisienne) pour violon et violoncelle et autres œuvres... avec David Lively, Youli Galpérine, Sébastien Hurtaud, Réna et Victoria Shereshevskaya, Vladimir Chernov. Suoniecolori 253652
- Trame d'opéra, arrangements de Roger Boutry: Massenet (Méditation de Thaïs and other pieces), Gounod, Saint-Saëns, Rabaud... and Isabelle Aboulker (Aboulker, André David)... with Roger Boutry, Isabelle Aboulker, Nicolas Galpérine and Pierrette Germain (créations). Marcal classics131201
- Laurent Martin, Légendes, concerto pour violon (à AG, création), avec ensemble et chœur, 2e2m dir. Pierre Roullier. Inactuelles. "Coup de cœur" Académie Charles Cros, "A emporter" Res Musica
- Édouard Souberbielle's String Quartet (dedicated to AG, premiere) avec les membres du quatuor Stanislas, CD dans le livre Edouard Souberbielle, un maître de l'orgue. Delatour-France, DLT 1842. "A Emporter" Res Musica
- Réédition in Edouard Souberbielle, organiste et compositeur (Messiaen, Langlais, Janáček, Sokola, Souberbielle...) with Édouard Souberbielle, Natacha Galpérine, AG etc. Forgotten Records fr.1388
- Pierre de Bréville's Sonatas 1 and 2, AG and Gérard Fallour, Le Parnasse Français, CD003
- Pascale Criton, Artefact (premiere), Ensemble 2e2m dir. Paul Méfano. assai 222482 "Coup de Coeur" Académie Charles Cros
- John Harbison, Twilight music, George Rochberg, quatuor avec piano (création), avec les American Chamber Players. Music from the Library of Congress, Koch International classics 3-7027-2 HI CD et K7
- René Herbin, Sonate pour violon et piano, AG and Elisabeth Herbin. 33rpm. Pavane records, Brussels, ADW 7143
- Laurent Martin, 7 chemins pour Joël, with 2e2m. Création pour l'exposition Méditations by Joël Kermarrec, Mont Saint-Michel 2004. CD inséré dans le livret-catalogue, galerie Baudoin Lebon. ISBN 2-87688-045-8
- Schönberg, Première Symphonie de Chambre (version Webern), Schubert, Notturno pour trio... Ensemble MusicAvanti, AG, Carlos Roque Alsina, David Simpson, Renaud François, Louis-Vincent Bruère. MUS 20041/1
- Diego Losa, Historias de dos mundos, pour violon, violoncelle et électronique, dédié à AG et David Simpson, AG, David Simpson, GRM (création). CD dans partition, éditions du conservatoire de Strasbourg, ISMN 707029-53-4
- Jean-Bernard Collès, sonate pour violon et violoncelle (à AG et Jean de Spengler, création), AG et J. De Spengler, CD dans partition, Delatour-France, dlt 1725
- Sélection du n25 de Orgues nouvelles, CD incorporé: N.Boulanger (Lux aeterna), David Conte ( Dies Irae, extrait des Requiem Songs), Magali Léger, Carolyn Shuster-Fournier, AG... ISBN 979-10-92122-25-1
- VIII International Festival of contemporary music, Ilkhom-XX, Tashkent. Philippe Leroux, "Continu(ons)", avec Jay Gottlieb et 2e2m, dir. Paul Méfano
- Musiques de scène pour la pièce Le Salon d'été de Coline Serreau. Compositions et arrangements: Jeff Cohen, Alexis Galpérine, Philippe Rouèche. Musiques vocales et instrumentales, chorégraphie Laura Scozzi, créations. La Guilde des Musiciens GDM1 Nominé Molière du théâtre musical
- Lettres du Front, mélodies de la Grande Guerre: Debussy, Bréville, Büsser, Fleury, Hahn, Vellones, Schultze... Avec Guillaume Palissy, Michel Glasko, Gérard Fallour... Corélia cc87.4708
- Coffret, 2 cd: même disque plus "Mémorial", avec Musique principale de l'armée de terre (dir. J-M Sorlin), orgue de Saint-Louis des Invalides (Eric Ampeau). Cor. cc87. 4709
- Otto-Albert Tichy, enregistrements d'archives. Edouard Souberbielle, Otto Tichy, AG et G. Fallour (à Alexis, création, deux pièces pour violon et piano), Orchestre de chambre de Lausanne dir. Victor Desarzens, Madrigalistes de Bohême... GALLO CD 1095
- Maurice Emmanuel, les six Sonatines pour piano par Laurent Wagschal, CD + DVD avec la Suite sur des airs populaires grecs (AG et Laurent Wagschal), Timpani 1C1194, 5 Diapasons, Disque du Moment, 4 étoiles Classica
- Marc Marder-Titi Matsumura... Avec Marc Marder, Dominique Lemonnier, Vincent Segal, Jean-Paul Celea, Vladimir Mendelssohn, Philippe Macé, Bernard Yannotta... EPIC Sony Records ESCB 1446
- Frédérik Martin, Sonate pour violon et piano (dédiée à Alexis Galpérine) et Trio. Créations. Avec Jay Gottlieb et Frédéric Baldassare. Forgotten Records, fr 1287
- Paul Méfano, Batro pour violon et violoncelle, avec AG et David Simpson, création; Renaud François, La Maison des Filtres, par l'Ensemble 2e2m, dir. Pierre Roullier (chant Kaoli Ishiki, violon AG, avec Solo-Méditation – à AG-, création), plus Initium par La Grande Ecurie et la Chambre du Roy, Luftklang, Ccmix (pièce électronique), etc. CD inséré dans le livre Dialogues entre Sons et Paroles (Paul Méfano-Renaud François), Editions Michel de Maule ISBN 978-2-87623-678-3

== Music for films ==
- Coline Serreau 18 ans après. Concerto pour deux violons en ré maj by Vivaldi, Patrice Fontanarosa, Alexis Galpérine, Joël Pontet and the chamber orchestra of the Conservatoire de Paris, original musics by Coline Serreau, AG and Christophe Julien etc. La bande son Universal 067 738-2
- La Belle Verte. Bach, sonate en ut pour violon seul, concerto by Beethoven (final) avec cadence burlesque d'Alexis Galpérine, with AG, Le Quatuor (Vercambre, Camors, Cirade, Ganem), l'Orchestre des Lauréats du Conservatoire, original scores by Coline Serreau, with AG, Gérard Fallour, James Thierrée, plus miscellaneous works: Bach by Michel Chapuis, Mozart by Teresa Stich-Randall, Bach with the Swingle Singers... BMG La Bande Son LBS 10960901
- Le Joueur de violon. Dir. art. Gidon Kremer. Gidon Kremer, AG, Vladimir Mendelssohn... AUVIDIS Travelling K 1009 CD and K7
- Sidewalk Stories. Musics by Marc Marder, Alexis Galpérine, Jeanne-Marie Conquer, Pierre-Henri Xuereb, Cécilia Tsan, Marc Marder, Jean-Christophe Falala, Bernard Yannotta, Amaury Wallez, Richard Foy, Antoine Curé, Jérôme Naulais, Jay Gottlieb... ISLAND Antilles 91321 CD, 33 rpm and K7
- Laurent Martin, Quelques jours en septembre, Coline Serreau, 18 ans après..., Diego Losa, Europolis. Stage music: Jeff Cohen, Philippe Rouèche and Alexis Galpérine, Le Salon d'été (first version). Forgotten records fr 1311
- Peter Notte (Jean-Pierre Bouquet): Lamento (Sonate and "Petite Pièce", premiere), AG and JP Bouquet, Justement Music, film music catégory, MYMA, catalogue EMI, ASIN: BO 7369 XWNK

== Filmography ==
- Charlie van Damme's Le joueur de violon. Production Hachette Première, René Cleitman. Sélection officielle Festival de Cannes 1994. With Richard Berry, François Berléand, Inès de Medeiros... Artistic direction: Gidon Kremer. AG: conseiller au violon, participation bande son et figuration à l'écran. YouTube
- La Belle Verte, un film de Coline Serreau. Production Alain Sarde, Martine Gozlan. Avec Coline Serreau, Vincent Lindon, Samuel Tasinaje, James Thierrée, Marion Cotillard, Patrick Timsit, Le Quatuor, Denis Podalydès... AG: violoniste-acteur à l'écran, bande son (interprète et compositeur). DVD Actes Sud, ISBN 978-2-7427-8290-1
- Sidewalk Stories, un film de Charles Lane. Palme Festival de Tribeca, Cannes Quinzaine des réalisateurs, Grand Prix du Public, Grand Prix Festival de Chamrousse. Interprète bande son, musique de Marc Marder. VHS Pathé Video, DVD Carlotta 720 64
- Chronique d'une fin d'après-midi, film de Pierre Romans d'après Tchékhov. Prod. Fr 3, Nanterre-Amandiers. Musique d'Anne-Marie Fijal. Interprétation de la bande son: AG, Sonia Wieder-Atherton...
- Tombés du ciel, un film de Philippe Lioret, avec Jean Rochefort. Epithète Filmania et Canal+. Music by Jeff Cohen. Interprète bande son. DVD 1392/302 318-9, Prix de la mise en scène et Prix du scénario, Festival de Saint-Sébastien
- Marion, un film de Manuel Poirier. Vertigo Productions et France 2 Cinéma. Avec Marie-France Pisier, Jean-Luc Bideau... Musique de Anne-Marie Fijal. AG interprète de la bande son
- Souleymane Cissé, documentaire de Rithy Panh (1991), collection Cinéastes de notre temps. Prod. André S. Labarthe et Janine Bazin, ORTF-ARTE. Festival International de La Rochelle. Bande-son: Marc Marder
- Merci mon chien, un film de Philippe Galland. Avec Jean Benguigui, Yolande Moreau... BAC Films. Interprète bande son, musique de Philippe Rouèche. DVD À la Une
- Maurice Emmanuel, La Rumeur du Monde. Un film de Anne Bramard-Blagny and Julia Blagny. Avec AG et Laurent Wagschal (exécution musicale et interview), Henri Dutilleux, Anne Eichner-Emmanuel... DVD Timpani, ABB Reportages 1C1194 5 Diapasons, 4 étoiles Classica, Disque du Moment
- Henryk Szeryng, sa vie, ses passions. Un film de Jean-Yves Landry, TV canadienne. Interviews: AG, Youri Boukoff, Lawrence Foster, Madame Arthur Rubinstein, Gérard Devos, Bernard Millant, Alexandre Lagoya... YouTube
- Les Incontournables, Olivier Greif compositeur. Boxset of 12 films by Anne Bramard-Blagny and Julia Blagny (ou deux coffrets de 6 DVD ou DVD séparés), ABB Reportages and Timpani. DVD 9F1216. With AG, Pascal Amoyel, Nicolas Bacri, Mildred Clary, Romain David, Stéphanie Moraly, Henri Demarquette, Henri Dutilleux, Brigitte François-Sappey, Yves Petit de Voize, Philippe Hersant, Alice Ader, Dominique de Williencourt, Marc Minkowski, Benoît Menut, Jean-Claude Casadesus, Henri Barda, Emmanuelle Bertrand...
- AG (DVD séparés): Nuits, démêlées, Les Chants de L'Âme, Entretiens avec ses amis. Bande son et interview...
- "We are the Words", short film by Anne Bramard-Blagny; Olivier Greif, Brigitte François-Sappey, AG, Henri Demarquette, Philippe Hersant... YouTube
- Bertold Brecht's The Caucasian Chalk Circle. Théâtre national de la Colline, directed by Benno Besson. Un film réalisé par Vitold Grand'Henry. AG: music arrangement (Scottish Waltz).
- La Terre qui flambe (Der Brennende Acker), silent film by Friedrich Wilhelm Murnau (1921). Production Goron-Deulig Exklusiv Film. Restauration du film produite par Éric Rohmer, commande ARTE et ZDF. Music by Anne-Marie Fijal. Interprétation bande son: Anne-Marie Fijal, AG, Carole Robinson, Martine Bailly.
- Quelques jours en Septembre, film by Santiago Amigorena, production Films Gemini (Italy), Festival de Venise, sélection officielle, Festival de Toronto, sélection officielle, sélections Bratislava international Film Festival et Mar del Plata Film Festival. Avec Juliette Binoche, John Turturro, Sara Forestier, Nick Nolte... Interprète bande son, music by Laurent Martin. DVD video 2
- Dans la résonance de Maurice Emmanuel, a film by Anne Bramard-Blagny and Julia Blagny. ABB Reportages. DVD. With AG, Harry Halbreich, Christophe Corbier and the exceptional participation of Henri Dutilleux
- Maurice Emmanuel's Dans la résonance, trailer (long version), ABB
- Coline Serreau's 18 ans après, with Madeleine Besson, Michel Boujenah, Roland Giraud, André Dussolier, Line Renaud, James Thierrée, Philippine Leroy-Beaulieu... Interprète bande son (Vivaldi, and musics by Coline Serreau). DVD Studio Canal. Plus Making of, trailer and bonus...
- La Science au Réveil des Arts, Etienne-Jules Marey. A film by Josette Ueberschlag, Anne Bramard-Blagny and Julia Blagny. ABB Reportages, DVD. AG and Laurent Wagschal, exécution musicale à l'écran. Festival du Film d'Art de Montréal, sélection officielle.
- EJ Marey, La Science au Réveil des Arts, bande-annonce de Julia Blagny. AG exécution musicale et interview, PA Michaud conservateur Musée Pompidou...Vimeo
- Marie Thérèse Ibos, a film by Galpérine and Nicolas Galpérine. Interview de MT Ibos par AG. Bande son. Musica et Memoria, DVD
- Les 25 ans de l'Ensemble Stanislas, a documentary by Vladimir and Nicolas Galpérine, with AG, François Le Roux, the Stanislas Quartet, the Mosaïques Quartet, Coline Serreau, Chorale du Delta, Ensemble Stanislas.
- Hitragut, short film, diaporama-peintures, berceuse séfarade, arr. Paul Ben-Haïm. Varda Kotler, Jeff Cohen, Alexis Galpérine.
- Fontainebleau Art Schools, session 2010, short film by Marc-Antoine Modol et Tiphaine Roustang, with Philippe Entremont, Anthony Béchu, Alexis Galpérine, Allain Gaussin, Isabelle Duha, Bruno Pasquier, Tom Sheehan.
- Alexis Galpérine, présentation de son enseignement, short film by Jean-Christophe Pontiès, produit par le Service audiovisuel du Conservatoire de Paris.
- The Hors-Saison Musicale of the Pour que l'Esprit Vive association (Les Petits Frères des Pauvres). Presentation: Agnès Desjobert. With Guy Touvron, the Hanson Quartet, AG, Jean de Spengler, Mark Drobinsky, Anne Ricquebourg etc. Short film by Léonor Chapalain.
- Le Hors Saison Musicale of Pour que l'Esprit Vive, 2017-2018 season, parrainage: AG. Un week-end dans le Cher, interview et extraits de concerts, avec AG et Jean de Spengler. Short film by Léonor Chapalain.
- Alone by Paul Méfano, for solo violin, short film on paintings by Nathalie Méfano, réal. Laurent Martin.
- Joël Kermarrec, Méditation. DVD, images de Mathieu Portalier, texte dit par Olivier Kaeppelin, music by Laurent Martin, with the Ensemble 2e2m
- Lumières de Femmes, a film by Anne Bramard-Blagny and Julia Blagny. ABB Reportages. DVD Skarbo (Violon au Féminin) DSK41 50A. With Sara Chenal, Jean-Pierre Ferey, AG (interview), Graciane Finzi, Christine Géliot, Pierrette Germain-David, Suzanne Giraud, Laure Marcel-Berlioz, Edith Canat de Chizy, Chrystel Marchand, Laurent Martin (pianist)...
- Saint-Jacques... La Mecque, a film by Coline Serreau. Production Charles Gassot. With Muriel Robin, Pascal Légitimus, Jean-Pierre Darroussin... Interprète bande son. Double DVD with bonus (les musiques du film)
- Les Concertos d'Alzheimer, a film by Anne Bramard-Blagny and Julia Blagny. AG: interview et exécution musicale. ABB Reportages, DVD, YouTube Audiens
- "Rass El Khit" (La Tête du Fil), film de Jilali Ferhati, TV Maroc. Bande son
- Europolis, a film by Cornel Gheorghita. Production Société Roumaine de TV et Eurimages. Interprète bande son. Musique de Diego Losa. Mention spéciale du jury pour une première œuvre au Festival des Films du Monde de Montréal. Prix de la meilleure musique de film au Festival International du Film de Chypre
- Coline Serreau, coffret de 8 DVD. Avec bonus, making of, bandes annonces etc. Studio Canal and INA
- Hommage à Elsa Barraine. Concert, documentary directed by Marc Lipka. AG and Graciane Finzi, DVD Marcal vidéo
- Le Centre Français des Musiques Juives (avec extraits de l'enregistrement de la sonate pour violon et piano de Fernand Halphen). Un film documentaire de Aurélie Bray, Maud Cohen and Julie Davy (2007). Prod. Fondation du Judaïsme Français. Avec Hervé Roten, Jeff Cohen, AG, Jessica Roda etc.
- Marie-Claire Galpérine, conférence (Plato), August 1997, Lagrasse, Le Banquet du Livre. Réalisation Editions Verdier. AG: bande son générique (Stravinsky).
- Marie-Claire Galpérine, conférence
- Marie-Claire Galpérine, conférence
- Le renouveau de l'art sacré en France au XXème siècle, autour de l'amitié Léon Bloy-Georges Rouault, conférence d'Alexis Galpérine, avec extraits musicaux (Chausson, Stravinsky, Satie par AG, Quatuor Koltès et Ilen Song), église Notre-Dame de Toute Grâce, Plateau d'Assy. Un film de Godefroid de Maupeou, site Les Musicales d'Assy.
- Sequence 2 Time, Lionel Polard-Cohen, video, AG (Les Clameurs de l'Ombre)
- Léon Bloy, pèlerin de l'Absolu, film by Jean-Yves Fischbach, with Natacha Galpérine, Maxime d'Aboville, François Angelier, Henri Quantin, Monseigneur Jean-Pierre Batut, AG (interview and bande son), Pierre Glaudes, François Gadeyne... Production KTO.

=== Publications and collaborations ===
- Carlos Roqué Alsina – Entretiens, Témoignages et documents, with thexts by Michel Portal, Vinko Globokar, Renaud François, Daniel Teruggi, Bernard de Vienne... Éditions Delatour France, 2011- ISBN 978-2-7521-0111-2
- Edouard Souberbielle, un maître de l'orgue. With testimonies by Michel Chapuis, Francis Chapelet, Nicolas Gorenstein, André Isoir, Louis-Marie Vigne, Henri Sauguet, Jean-Marie Cardinal Lustiger... Éditions Delatour France, 2010. Collection Organ Prestige directed by Frédéric Denis – ISBN 978-2-7521-0091-7 "A Emporter" Res Musica
- Le dernier cantor de Moravie, Otto Albert Tichy. Éditions Delatour France, 2010. Series Organ Prestige diriected by Frédéric Denis – ISBN 978-2-7521-0109-9
- Léon Souberbielle, Le plein jeu de l'orgue français à l'époque classique, Introduction (bilingual text anglo-French). Avec témoignage-dédicace by Olivier Messiaen. Éditions Delatour France, 2010. Series Organ Prestige directed by Frédéric Denis – EAN 3760124530995
- Georges Auric, Les Amis de la Musique Française
- Henri Dutilleux, un compositeur à La Sage. Texts by Alexis Galpérine, Jean-Michel Quinodoz, Danielle de Spengler, Jean de Spengler, Francine Walter Laudenbach, Alexis Jenni... Préface by Pierre Gervasoni. Editions Slatkine (Geneva), ISBN 978-2-8321-0839-0
- Un cursus de dix ans à la classe de violon, with Ana Reverdito-Haas. Éditions Delatour France, 2012 – ISBN 978-2-7521-0154-9
- Huit Figures exemplaires de professeurs de violon (portraits: Charmy, Galamian, Talluel, Szeryng, Francescatti, Bernstein, Accardo, Amoyal etc.) Delatour-France, ISBN 978-2-7521-0203-4
- Paul Méfano, testimonies (Alain Bancquart, Pierre Roullier, Thierry Blondeau, Alexis Galpérine...) and entretiens, collective work under the direction of Laurent Martin. Bilingual edition Franco-English. Inactuelles and Les Belles Lettres.
- La Musique française pour violon, de la Convention à la seconde guerre mondiale. Éditions du Conservatoire à rayonnement régional de Strasbourg, ISBN 978-2-9515197-7-0
- Léon Bloy, Lettres à ses filles; présentation et iconographie d'Alexis Galpérine. Madeleine Bloy, Souvenirs d'enfance, Madeleine Fuget, Léon Bloy vu par une enfant, établissement du texte. Delatour-France ISBN 978-2-7521-0169-3
- Olivier Greif, collective work under the direction of Brigitte François-Sappey and Jean-Michel Nectoux. Philippe Hersant, Christophe Henkel, Alexis Galpérine, Gérard Condé, Henri Barda, Gilles Cantagrel, Michel Dalberto, Henri Demarquette, Marc Minkowski, Mildred Clary... Éditions Aedam Musicae, ISBN 978-2-919046-15-7.
- Léon Bloy et la musique, actes du colloque sur Le Désespéré, sous la direction de Pierre Glaudes. Cahier Minard 7, Les Lettres Modernes ISBN 978-2-256-91128-6
- Enseigner le violon: quel(s) savoir(s) pour demain ? Actes du colloque du conservatoire de Strasbourg, Communications de Boris Garlitsky, Devy Erlih, Marc-Olivier Dupin, Alexis Galpérine, Suzanne Gessner, Ahmed Essyad etc. 1998. Éditions du Conservatoire de Strasbourg ISBN 2-9515197-0-2
- De nouveaux horizons pour l'évaluation, collective work. Interventions by AG, Mark André, Armand Angster, Denis Dercourt, Olivier Reboul, Aline Zylberajch... Éditions du Conservatoire de Strasbourg, collection pédagogie ISBN 978-2-9515197-6-3
- Comment enseigner la musique aujourd'hui? Ouvrage collectif, interventions de Marie-Claude Ségard, Claude-Henry Joubert, Mark André, AG... Éditions du Conservatoire de Strasbourg, collection pédagogie ISBN 978-2-9515197-9-4
- Variations sur la reprise. Séminaire au conservatoire de Strasbourg. Ouvrage collectif : Rodolphe Burger, Olivier Cadiot, Jean-Luc Nancy, Peter Szendy, James Blood Ulmer, Alexis Galpérine... Éditions du conservatoire de Strasbourg ISBN 978-2-917418-00-0
- Marie-Thérèse Ibos, leaflet, plus DVD by Alexis Galpérine and Nicolas Galpérine. Musica et Memoria et Les Amis de la Musique Française (distribution).
- Musique et musiciens en Lorraine. Collective work under the direction of Yves Ferraton, actes du colloque d'Épinal 2009. Article Le violon en Lorraine. Éditions Dominique Guéniot ISBN 978-2-87825-468-6
- Compositrices du XXe siècle, vol.II, collective work under the direction of Pierrette Germain. Articles about Claire Delbos, Madeleine Bloy-Souberbielle and Véronique Bloy-Tichy. Association Femmes et Musique. Éditions Delatour-France ISBN 978-2-7521-0240-9
- Technique et Art dans l'œuvre pour violon de J.S. Bach, XVIII Convegno internazionale sul violino, Gorizia 2000. Textes bilingues (trad. italienne) by Alexis Galpérine, Roman Totenberg, Koji Toyoda, Renato Zanettovitch, Anatoli Reznikovsky, Rodolfo Lipizer etc. Edizioni Santabarbara ISBN 978-88-87512-21-2
- We are the words, Olivier Greif, entretiens avec ses amis. Texts by Henri Dutilleux, Philippe Hersant, Pascal Amoyel, Nicolas Bacri, Alexis Galpérine, Henri Barda, Jean-Claude Casadesus, Henri Demarquette, Brigitte François-Sappey, Yves Petit de Voize, Emmanuelle Bertrand, Dominique de Williencourt, Étienne Yver, Jean-Jacques Greif, Marc Minkowski etc. Éditions Delatour-France ISBN 978-2-7521-0164-8
- Laurent Martin, composer. With texts by Paul Méfano, Pierre-Albert Castenet, Pierre Roullier, Alexis Galpérine and Laurent Martin. Éditions à la ligne ISBN 2-913734-01-4
- Les plus beaux manuscrits des romanciers français, Bibliothèque Nationale de France. Collective work under the direction of Jean-Pierre Guéno. Notices by Pierre-Jean Rémy, Marie-Claire Bancquart, Jean d'Ormesson, Jean Lacouture, Michel Pastoureau, François Nourissier etc. AG: notice sur le manuscrit of Léon Bloy' La Femme pauvre. Éditions Robert Laffont ISBN 2-221-07827-6
- Bulletins des Amis de Maurice Emmanuel, 6 et 7, ISSN 1773-9519
- Bulletin de l'Association des Amis de Gaston Bachelard 11, Bachelard et la Musique. ISSN 1299-3638
- Jacques Chailley, musicologue et théoricien, actes du colloque de la Sorbonne 2000. Jean-Pierre Bartoli, Edith Weber, Gilles Cantagrel, AG, Serge Gut, Nigel Wilkins... Musurgia, vol.XIX, Éditions ESKA, ISSN 1257-7537
- Bulletins Musica et Memoria ISSN 0761-9162
- 121-124 Obituaire Marie-Thérèse Ibos
- 125-128 Edouard Souberbielle
- 129-132 Otto-Albert Tichy, Marie-Thérèse Ibos
- 133-136 Léon Souberbielle, Lola Bluhm, Marie-Claire Galpérine, Armand Merck, Pierre Germain et les mélodies de Duparc
- 137-140 Eugène Borrel, Félix Raugel, Lionel de La Laurencie, Armand Parent
- 141-144 Alfred Loewenguth, Thérèse Souberbielle, André Isoir, Harry Halbreich
- Nicolas Gorenstein, Edouard Souberbielle, un Maître. Préface d'Alexis Galpérine. Éditions Chanvrelin, CHVR 061
- Contributions to Dictionnaire universel des Créatrices, Édition des Femmes, on Ginette Neveu, Marguerite Canal, Henriette Puig-Roget: Vol. 1, ISBN 978-2-7210-0628-8; Vol. 2, ISBN 978-2-7210-0629-5; Vol. 3, ISBN 978-2-7210-0630-1
- Pierre Wissmer, un compositeur au XXe siècle, collective work: Daniel-Lesur, Joan Guinjoan, Pierrette Germain, AG, Jean-Jacques Werner, Alain Pâris... Éditions de Penthes, Geneva
- Franck Bedrossian, De l'excès du son, texts by Philippe Leroux, Pierre Roullier, Omer Corlaix, Alexis Galpérine... Édition bilingue franco-anglaise. (Éditions à la ligne)
- Vingt-cinq ans de conférences à l'Institut de Musicologie de Nancy, Université de Lorraine (1990–2015). Conférences réunies par Yves Ferraton. Le Parnasse français ISBN 978-2-9545 388-3-9. AG (La Musique Française pour Violon... Version revue et augmentée), Michel Bur, Charles Rosen, Carl de Nys, Marc Fumaroli, Huguette Dreyfus, Michel Fano, William Christie, Marie-Claire Alain and Gilles Cantagrel, Henri-Louis de La Grange, France Clidat, Gabriel Bacquier, Dominique Jameux.
- Hommage à Henriette Puig-Roget. Texts: AG, Henriette PR, témoignages de Paul Fort, Olivier Messiaen... Centre de Recherche et d'Édition du Conservatoire (CNSMDP, CREC)
- Geneviève Joy ou le Grand Style, in Dutilleux 2016 (www.dutilleux2016.com). Témoignages d'AG, Pierre Gervasoni, Jean-François Heisser, Kaija Saariaho, Renée Fleming, Gérard Grisey, Jean Leduc, Franck Krawczyk, Esa Pekka-Salonen, Pascal Rophé... La Philharmonie (Paris)
- Fernand Halphen's Du Salon au Front. Ouvrage sous la direction de Laure Schnapper, textes de AG, Hervé Roten, François Le Roux, Pierre-André Meyer, Stéphanie Moraly, Philippe Blay, Jean-Christophe Branger, Basile Baudez. Éditions Hermann, ISBN 978 2 7056 94111
- Renaud François et Paul Méfano, Dialogues entre Sons et Paroles, avant-propos d'Alexis Galpérine, CD incorporé, Editions Michel de Maule, ISBN 978-2-87623-678-3
- Maurice Emmanuel, Biographie and Catalogue des oeuvres musicales, Anne Eichner-Emmanuel, Franck Emmanuel and Maurice Emmanuel, foreword by Alexis Galpérine, Delatour-France, ISBN 9782752103482

=== Contribution to various books and projects ===
- Francis Poulenc, correspondance 1910–1963, réunie, présentée et annotée par Myriam Chimènes. Fourniture de documents (lettres de Poulenc à Edouard Souberbielle). Éditions Fayard ISBN 2-213-03020-0
- Léon Bloy et Johanne Molbech, correspondance 1889–1890. Édition établie par Natacha Galpérine. Aide à l'iconographie. Éditions Classiques Garnier, ISBN 978-2-8124-0034-6
- Natacha Galpérine, Jeanne et Léon Bloy. Une écriture à quatre mains. Éditions du Cerf, ISBN 9782204124010. Aide relecture et iconographie, fourniture de documents
- Carolyn Shuster Fournier, Un siècle de vie musicale à l'église de la Trinité à Paris. Fourniture de documents. Éditions L'Harmattan, ISBN 978-2-343-03485-0
- Bulletins de l'association Maurice Duruflé, N 11 et 14. Fourniture de documents. ISSN 1628-7509
- Le mouvement scholiste de Paris à Lyon, un exemple de décentralisation musicale avec Georges Martin Witkowski. Échange d'informations. Éditions Symétrie, ISBN 2-914373-07-4
- Charles de Couëssin et Gaëtane Prouvost, Zino Francescatti, le chant du violon. Aide relecture. Éditions L'Harmattan, ISBN 2-7384-7552-3
- André David par Mireille Gaudin. Témoignages de Charles Chaynes, AG, Geneviève Ibanez... Les Amis de la musique française. ISBN 2-915318-17-4
- Catalogue d'exposition André David, Soumensac 2017. Textes de Pierrette Germain-David, Maurice David, AG, France-Yvonne Bril...
- Rencontre avec Henryk Szeryng (échange d'informations), Press Art Lausanne
- Sophie Sultan, Devy Erlih, Portrait d'un violoniste pionnier. Interviews d'AG, Philippe Graffin, Svetlin Roussev... Editions du Robec, ISBN 978-2-9564338-0-4
- Patrick Prunel, Enseigner la musique. Foreword by Alexis Galpérine. Edit. La Lettre du musicien, ISBN 979-10-91544-01-6
- La Revue Générale, 10 1998, Le Cinéma par la bande. Michèle Levaux: Un soir après théâtre avec Coline Serreau. Contribution. Duculot, Louvain, ISBN 2-8011-1190-2
- Jeu de pommes, poems by Pierrette Germain, illustrations. Delatour, France, ISBN 978-2-7521-0168-6
- Quisaitout et Grobêta, play by Coline Serreau, directed by Benno Besson, décors Jean-Marc Stehlé, music by David Hogan, conseiller pour le violon AG... Actes Sud ISBN 2-86943-371-9
- Le Salon d'été, play by Coline Serreau, directed by Coline Serreau, décor Jean-Marc Stehlé, choreography by Laura Scozzi, compositions et arrangements musicaux Jeff Cohen, Alexis Galpérine and Philippe Rouèche... CADO, Actes Sud
- Brochure, film Le joueur de Violon, texts by René Cleitman, AG, Gidon Kremer, Charlie Van Damme, André Tubeuf... Hachette Première
- Brochure Festival de Cannes 94, Le Joueur de Violon, sélection officielle, entretiens avec René Cleitman, Richard Berry, Gidon Kremer, AG, Charlie Van Damme, propos recueillis par André Tubeuf. Hachette Première
- Brochure La Schola Cantorum de Paris, textes AG, Claude Samuel... Edit. Schola Cantorum
- Brochures-palmarès du cnsmdp
- Brochure Les 25 ans de l'Académie-Festival des Arcs, échange d'informations, texts by Bernard Yannotta, Michel Dalberto, Franck Mallet...
- Brochure Les 40 ans de l'Académie-Festival des Arcs, texts by Roger Godino, Pierre Maurel, Eric Crambes, Alexis Galpérine, Franck Mallet...
- Lena ou le destin d'un violon, sort story by Pierrette Germain-David (to AG and Annie Jodry). Échange d'informations. Édition Zurfluh, ISBN 978-2-87750-125-5
- Thierry de Maigret, catalogue d'exposition publique, Hôtel Drouot Richelieu, May 2013. Fourniture de documents (manuscrits de L.Bloy)
- Bulletins et Lettres L'Amirésol
- NPR Classical Music Companion, Miles Hoffman, échanges d'informations, Mariner books, Hougton Mifflin Company, ISBN 0-395-70742-0
- Nouvelles lettres de Berlioz, de sa famille, de ses contemporains. Correspondance générale tome IX. Peter Bloom, Joël-Marie Fauquet, Hugh Macdonald, Cécile Reynaud, Actes-Sud/Palazzetto Bru-Zane, ISBN 978-2-330-06255-2 Fourniture de documents (letter from Berlioz to Kreutzer)
- Introduction d'Augustin Laffay o.p. aux Essais et Pamphlets de Léon Bloy (citation partielle de l'article d'AG Défense de Léon Bloy), édition établie par Maxence Caron, series "Bouquins", Robert Lafont. ISBN 978 2 221 19330 3
- Quatre écrivains catholiques sur la question juive, de Bloy à Maritain, actes de colloque, Reims 2017. Citation partielle d'une lettre de AG, text by Henri Quantin. Editions ACSIReims, ISBN 978-2-9558752-1-6
- Désintégration, novel by Vladimir Galpérine. AG: dessin de couverture. Ed. Librinova, ISBN 979-10-262-1575-2

=== Bibliography ===
- Drillon, Jacques (2009). "Le musicien et son double". Le Nouvel Observateur.
- Chani Stroobant, "Sens, fonctions et discernement de l'usage verbal de l'impératif dans la pédagogie du développement artistique du violon: observations à partir de cours dispensés par Alexis Galpérine au CNSMDP". Texte produit dans le cadre d'un travail de Master 2 de l'EHESS, 2014
