= Orchestre des Pays de Savoie =

French classical orchestra

The Orchestre des Pays de Savoie is a French classical orchestra that was the result of a collaboration between the Savoie and Haute-Savoie departments. The orchestra is a permanent member of the French Orchestra Association (AFO). It was created in 1984 with the support of the Entente régionale de Savoie (now the Assemblée des Pays de Savoie), the Rhône-Alpes Region, and the French Ministry of Culture.

== Musical directors ==
Since 1984, its musical directors have been Patrice Fontanarosa, Tibor Varga, Mark Foster, and Graziella Contratto. Under the impetus of its successive conductors, it has become one of the most dynamic French orchestras. Nicolas Chalvin took over as musical director in September 2009.

== Performances ==
As well as the orchestra’s musical seasons, a cultural policy is being established aimed at making young people interested in music, with initiatives such as ‘Collégiens au Concert’ for schoolchildren, and ‘Campus en Musique’ for university students. Additionally, the orchestra brings music to the underprivileged.

Based in Chambéry and Annecy, the Orchestre des Pays de Savoie gives most of its performances in Savoie and Haute-Savoie and also appears elsewhere in the Rhône-Alpes region, as well as in the rest of France and abroad. It has played at prestigious venues including the Amphitheater of the Opéra Bastille, the Cité de la Musique (also in Paris), the Victoria Hall (Geneva), the State Academic Kapella in St Petersburg, the Rachmaninov and Tchaikovsky Hall in Moscow, and the Théâtre National Mohammed V in Rabat (Morocco). Since 2011, the Orchestra has led the "Musique à la Grange au Lac" series in the prestigious concert hall built for Mstislav Rostropovitch in Evian.

It is also present at many festivals (including the Festival de musique de La Chaise-Dieu, Saoû sings Mozart, Berlioz, Les Arts Jaillissants, Ambronay, Lyon Early Music Festival) and works regularly with Les Solistes de Lyon–Bernard Tétu, Lyon Opéra-Théâtre, the Debussy Quartet, Les Percussions Claviers de Lyon, Compagnie Ecuador, and others. In April 2008, the orchestra took part in La Folle Tournée, a tour with four other musical ensembles taking in five regional theaters. It has worked regularly with the Orchestre de Chambre de Genève, over the border in Switzerland, since 1991.

This season it will be taking part for the third time running in ‘Orchestres en Fête!’, organised by the French Association of Orchestras with the aim of presenting the work of a large orchestral ensemble to a wide audience. The orchestra also regularly premieres new works by French composers such as Gilbert Amy, Jean-Louis Agobet, Philippe Hersant, Emmanuel Bex, François Sarhan, Benoît Menut, Cyrille Lehn and Florentine Mulsant.

Guest conductors include Reinhard Goebel, Christophe Coin, Jean-Jacques Kantorow, Ton Koopman, Arnold Oestman, Pascal Rophé, Pascal Verrot, Christopher Warren-Green, François-Xavier Roth, Jean Deroyer, Kenneth Weiss, Henning Kraggerud, Christoph Poppen or Sigiswald Kuijken. The orchestra works with soloists of international repute such as Patricia Petibon, Bertrand Chamayou, Emmanuel Rossfelder, François, Didier Lockwood, and Renaud Capuçon.
