= Élise Galpérine =

French writer

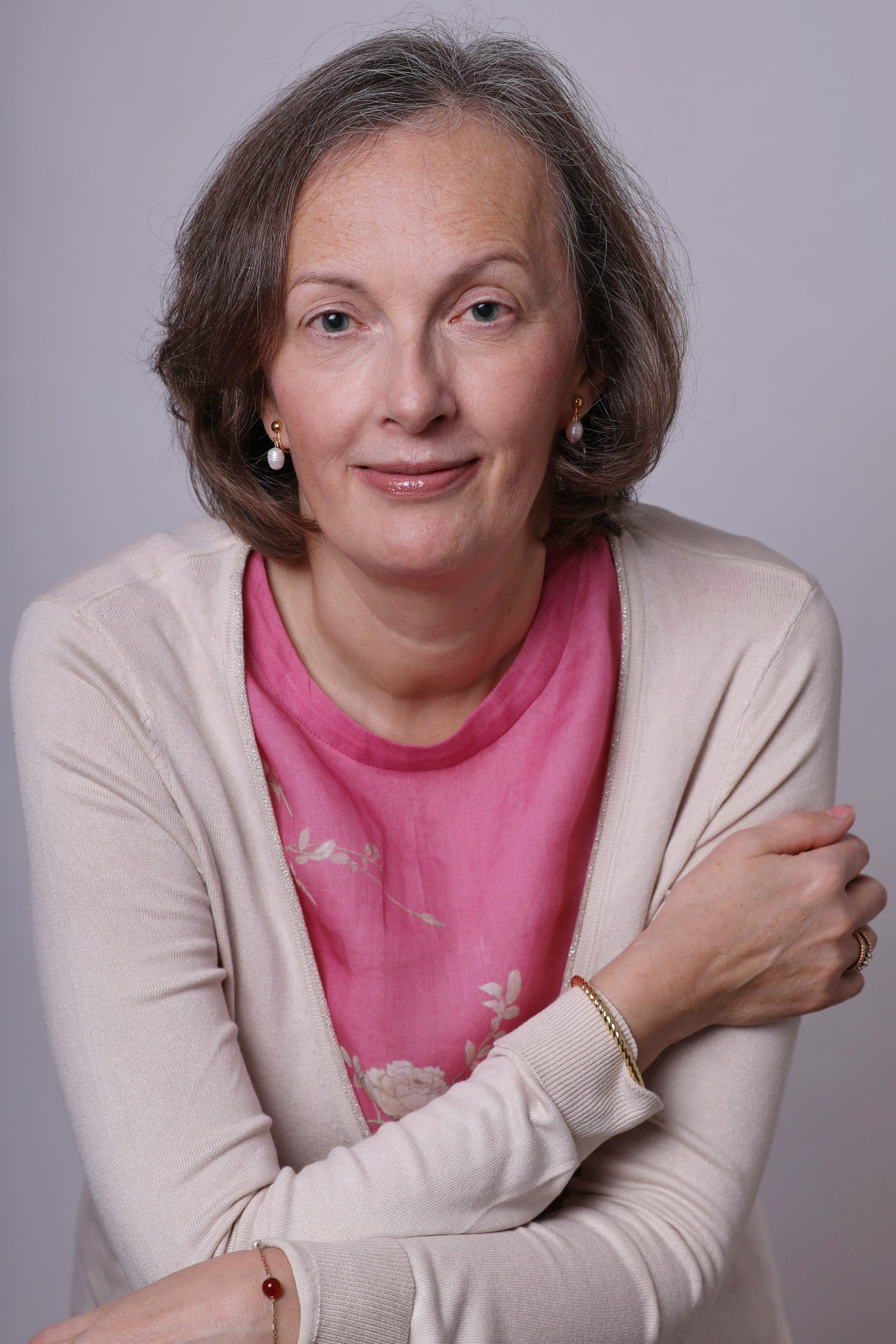
- Élise Galpérine in 2019
- Born: Élise Lefebvre; 1964 (age 61–62); Paris, France
- Occupations: Writer, jurist
- Spouse: Alexis Galpérine

Élise Galpérine (born Élise Lefebvre in 1964) is a French writer and jurist.

== Biography ==
Born in Paris in 1964, she married Alexis Galpérine, a violinist and professor at the Conservatoire de Paris (CNSMD).

== Literary work ==
Galpérine published her first novel, Le Murmure des tissus (The Murmur of Fabrics), in 2010, followed by a second novel in 2012, La Folie Giovanna. Her writing style is often associated with the poetry of Rimbaud, themes of childhood and suffering, and the descriptive precision of Marcel Proust. In 2019, she published La Vraie Histoire de John Doe (The True Story of John Doe).

=== Le Murmure des tissus ===
Upon the release of her debut novel, Le Figaro littéraire described it as a "delightful poetic stroll through the varied and colorful world of fabrics... a well-crafted feat that one never tires of reading." The writer and journalist Jacques Drillon, writing in Le Nouvel Observateur, noted that while more encyclopedic works might exist, "a book with more charm... is not possible."

=== La Folie Giovanna ===
Set from the late 19th century to the interwar period, this novel retraces the lives of two sisters, Giovanna and Louise, in the high society of a town in the Vercors Massif. Despite their protected environment and successful marriages, the story explores how misfortune can strike even the most innocent children, both unifying and weakening the family structure. The readers' jury for the magazine L'Express praised the novel for its "finesse in both style and character development."

=== La Vraie Histoire de John Doe ===
Covering a timeline from medieval England to modern America, this work explores the existence of legal archetypes as they manifest outside the courtroom—in literature, film, and the collective subconscious. The text uses a fictional counterpoint to demonstrate the close relationship between the legal world and the imagination.

=== Participation in literary festivals ===
Galpérine has been a guest at various literary fairs in Paris and Le Mans (25e Heure du Livre). She was also one of the sixteen authors selected by the Laval Debut Novel Festival.

== Legal career ==
Galpérine worked as an artistic agent for musicians for ten years, representing pianists such as Jean-Louis Haguenauer and Hortense Cartier-Bresson. She contributed to the films The Green Beautiful (1996) and Marion (1996). As a literary agent, she worked with Jacques Drillon and the composer Henri Dutilleux (for the interview book Mystère et mémoire des sons). She has authored numerous articles on artists' rights, notably for La Lettre du musicien, where she writes a regular column.

She has served as a lecturer at Sorbonne University Abu Dhabi and, from 1985 to 2020, at the Faculty of Law of Paris Cité University in Malakoff, where she taught English law.

== Publications ==
=== Books ===
- Le Murmure des tissus, Éditions Nicolas Chaudun, 2010 ISBN 978-2-35039-100-7.
- La Folie Giovanna, Éditions Nicolas Chaudun, 2012 ISBN 2-35039-120-5.
- La Vraie Histoire de John Doe, Classiques-Garnier, 2019 ISBN 978-2-406-08336-8.
- Collective work: "Le Musicien d'orchestre" in L'Orchestre symphonique, Revue 303, 2011.

=== Selected articles ===
- "Fiscalité des opérations de finance islamique : l'analyse du juge anglais", in Revue de Droit Fiscal, LexisNexis, 2015, p. 454.
- "L'interprétation des contrats en droit anglais", in L'actualité juridique en droit immobilier (AJDI), Dalloz, 2016, p. 491.
- "Value Added Tax on the Sales of Works of Art", Bruylant, in Entertainment, droit, média, art, culture, 2017/6, p. 467.
