= Anita Conti =

French explorer and oceanographer (1899–1997)

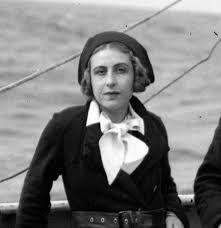
- Anita Conti in 1935
- Born: Anita Béatrix Marthe Caracotchian; 17 May 1899; Ermont, Paris, France
- Died: 25 December 1997 (aged 98); Douarnenez, France
- Other name: La Dame de la Mer
- Occupations: Explorer, photographer, oceanographer
- Known for: First French female oceanographer
- Notable work: Racleurs d'Océan (1956)
- Spouse: Marcel Conti (1902-1994)
- Children: Laurent Girault Conti (1956-)
- Honours: Chevalier de la Légion d'honneur (December 31st 1993)

Anita Conti (Armenian: Անիթա Գոնթի; née Caracotchian) (17 May 1899 – 25 December 1997) was a French-Armenian explorer and photographer, and the first female oceanographer in France.

Between the two World Wars, she began drawing the first fishing maps, when only navigation charts were available. Her scientific activity helped to rationalise deep-sea fishing practices and revolutionised aquaculture. From the 1940s onwards, she became concerned about the effects of industrial fishing on halieutic resources and ecosystems.

== Biography ==
=== Early life and education ===
Anita Beatrix Marthe Caracotchian was born on 17 May 1899 in Ermont, Seine-et-Oise. Her father was Léon (Leven) Caracotchian, a physician in the field of obstetrics of Armenian origin who owned a clinic in Paris. He had been born on 5 May 1870 in Andrinople (today Edirne, Turkey) and died on 18 January 1956 in Saint-Michel-sur-Orge, Essonne. Her mother was Alice Albertine Lebon, from a French upper middle class background. Anita had one brother, Stéphane.

Caracotchian spent her childhood being educated at home by different tutors and travelled with her family. In Brittany and Vendée, Anita regularly embarked with fishermen who awakened in her a great taste for the sea.

During the First World War, the family moved to the Island of Oleron where she took up photography, sailing and reading.

=== Work as a book binder and journalist ===
After moving to Paris age 19, she wrote poems and started binding books. Her unique style was imbued with her Oriental travels and readings. She used skins dyed according to recipes learned in the Caucasus. These creative innovations attracted the attention of many collectors and amateurs.

Her Parisian workshop notably welcomed Pierre Mac Orlan, who nicknamed her "the one who listens to books speak". Before ending her career as an art bookbinder in 1939, she was rewarded with numerous prizes in prestigious London, Paris, New York and Brussels salons, such as the Salon d’Automne or the Salon des Arts Décoratifs.

On 4 January 1927, Anita Caracotchian married Marcel Conti, an embassy attaché in Vienna, and took his surname. For a time, they lived in the 16th arrondissement in Paris and their house was thought to be home to monkeys, birds, foxes and toucans. He left her free to travel and write her own reports. In 1934, she published an investigation on oyster beds. Anita Conti also worked as a journalist for Le Figaro, L'Illustration; Neptuna; Mer et Colonies; Eve, le journal idéal de la femme or even for Le République.

=== Office Scientifique et Technique des Pêches Maritimes (1934–1942) ===
In 1934, Anita Conti was hired by Eduard Le Danois, a French zoologist, at the Office Scientifique et Technique des Pêches Maritimes (OSTPM) (today called IFREMER) as "propaganda manager". In 1935, during the inauguration of the "Palais de la Mer" (Biarritz Aquarium), her role was to receive journalists. She then joined the first océonographic vessel, Président Théodore Tissier. Although self-taught, she took measurements and samples, while observing fishing techniques. Gradually, the whole team built up a first oceanographic database as they travelled between Saint Pierre and Miquelon, Iceland and Spitsbergen.

In 1939, Conti spent 3 months on the Fécamp fishing trawler Vikings. On board, she developed a technique for cartographing specialised fishing maps, different from the used navigational charts. She published many scientific reports on the negative effects of industrial fishing. She took many photographs documenting life on board and set a series of parameters (water temperature, salinity, etc.) and their influence on fish populations.

At the outbreak of the Second World War, from November 1939 to January 1940, Conti was employed by the National French Navy on minesweepers in Dunkirk. There, as the only woman, she had to make her own uniform. She wrote an article about these missions in "l'Illustration". In May 1940, she took part in the evacuation of the World War II Battle of Dunkirk. She is generally acknowledged as the first woman actively participating on the French Navy ships.

Back in France, she escaped the Occupied Territory on board the fishing trawler Le Volontaire.

=== West Africa (1941–1947) ===
From 1941 onwards, she discovered new fish species unknown in France and their nutritional values in regards of protein deficiency for the local populations in Mauritania, Senegal, Mali (formerly French Sudan), Guinea, Ivory Coast, Niger, Burkina Faso (Upper Volta) and in the Republic of Benin (Dahomey). In 1943, the Provisional Government of the French Republic in Algeria commissioned her to investigate the fishing resources of West Africa as well as to conduct a study on traditional fishing methods.

For ten years, she worked to develop better conservation techniques, trained artisanal fishermen with new fishing methods and installed artificial dens and dryers for further studies. She founded many smokehouses and an experimental fishery for sharks in Guinea as she particularly focused on making known the virtues of shark liver, which is particularly rich in vitamins. Gradually, she became more and more conscientious of the misuse of natural resources by European fishing industries and the major waste that could be prevented. Throughout her work, she used traditional fishing techniques rather than Western standards.

When French institutions stopped subsidizing her initiatives, Conti created her own company in Conakry, Guinea, with the aim of continuing her research, promoting local fishing and improving conditions. However difficulties accumulated, violent storms destroyed facilities, and in the 1950s she returned to France.

From her travels between Port-Etienne and Conakry-Gbessia she brought back a python called Héliodore.

=== Bois Rosé III (1952) ===
In 1952, Conti worked on a 74 meter Fécamp fishing vessel, Bois Rosé III with Captain Eugène Recher. In her book Racleurs d'Océan (1953), Conti denounced the disastrous exploitation of halioeutic resources used by these boats. In 1955 it was translated into Spanish (Surcadores de océanos) and English (Deep Sea Saga). She was outraged by the waste she saw on board the ships, which threw large quantities of fish trapped in the nets back into the sea because they had no commercial value.

At the end of the 1950s, she worked for Commander Jacques Cousteau for two years at the Oceanographic Museum in Monaco. She listed poorly classified species.

In 1961, she made it clear through the media that discarded fish could be sold and consumed. She persuaded a trawler to keep sabrefish in its holds, which she sold at auction. It was bought by Parisian restaurateurs who promoted their culinary use. She also tried testing how to supply ships with selective capture systems.

In 1971 she published L’Ocean, les bêtes et l’homme, to denounce the disaster created by Man and its effects on oceans.

=== Later years ===
For the rest of her life, Conti advocated for the betterment of marine life during many conferences and forums.

On 27 January 1986, Conti met 30 year old illustrator Laurent Girault, on a parisian peniche owned by Jacques Rougerie for the publishing of his book Les Enfants du Capitaine Némo. He became her adopted son. After 1990, they lived together rue de la Plage in Fécamp. Laurent Girault-Conti is currently working on a book about their relationship, Haute mère.

For a time, she lived 186 rue de Rivoli in Paris.

On May 30, 1993, Conti inaugurated the Cité de la Mer museum and interpretation centre, created by the Espace Scientifique et Technique des Resources Aquatiques et de la Navigation (ESTRAN) in Dieppe and became its godmother. For her 98th anniversary, a grand party was hosted there. Sea captain Jean Recher, Catherine Chabaud and Paul Vatine were present.

Conti died on 25 December 1997 in Douarnenez, Brittany on the evening of a terrible storm. Louis Le Pensec, French Minister of Agriculture and Fisheries at the time, wrote: "Anita Conti - our great lady of the sea - has left us in Douarnenez on a stormy night that was also a Christmas Eve".

Anita Conti's ashes are scattered in the Iroise Sea.

== Legacy ==
In 2004, Laurent Girault-Conti, Anita's adopted son, donated more than 45,000 of her photographic works to the town of Lorient. The association "Cap sur Anita Conti" has decided to digitalise 28,000 of these black and white photos. They are consultable on their website.

All of her kinemastic works are also consultable on the Brittany Cinéatèque website.

Conti's honorary title "La dame de mer" is said to come from Yves La Prairie, the founder of the research institute Centre national pour l'exploitation des océans (CNEXO), forerunner of IFREMER. The term quickly spread among journalists and sailors. La Prairie paid tribute to her as La dame de mer de la France in the anthology Nos Marins (2005).

Several French school or infrastructures were named after Anita Conti:

- Lycée Anita Conti in Bruz (35170)
- Collège Anita Conti in Lorient (56100)
- Collège Anita Conti in Saint-Nazaire (44600)
- Lycée maritime Anita Conti in Fécamp (76402)
- Anita Conti Primary School Plouescat (29430)
- Anita Conti Primary School Plouzané (29263)
- The médiathèque in Beaucouzé (Maine-et-Loire).

Delivered in July to the GIE Dragages ports, the running suction dredger Anita Conti was christened in January 2014 in Pauillac. Equipped by the large maritime port of Bordeaux, it replaces the Pierre Lefort vessel.

On 17 May 2019 Google Doodle commemorated Anita Conti's 120th birthday.

On June 2, 2018, the symphonic work Anita, op. 81 by the French composer Benoît Menut was premiered by the National Brittany Orchestra. This piece was inspired by thousands of photos taken by Anita Conti during her trips, in particular those taken during the Newfoundland campaign on board the vessel Bois Rosé in 1952. Benoît Menut describes his music as lyrical and contemplative.

Anita Conti famously said: "La mer est un miroir qui nous ramène à notre propre ignorance".

In 2026, Conti was announced as one of 72 historical women in STEM whose names have been proposed to be added to the 72 men already celebrated on the Eiffel Tower. The plan was announced by the Mayor of Paris, Anne Hidalgo following the recommendations of a committee led by Isabelle Vauglin of Femmes et Sciences and Jean-François Martins, representing the operating company which runs the Eiffel Tower.

== Selected works ==
- Racleurs d'océans, Paris, 1953 (éd. André Bonne), 1993; (éd. Payot & Rivages), 1998 Viking Prize
- Géants des mers chaudes, Paris, 1957 (éd. André Bonne); éd. Payot & Rivages, 1997
- Regard d'une femme sur la guerre des mines à Dunkerque (1995)
- La route est si longue avant la nuit (anthology of all poetic works), Fécamp, Collège Jules Ferry, 1996
- L'Océan, les bêtes et l'homme ou l'ivresse du risque, éd. André Bonne, 1971; éd. Payot & Rivages, Paris, 1999
- Les Terre-neuvas, éd. du Chêne, Paris, 2004
- Le Carnet viking - 70 jours en mer de Barents (juin-septembre 1939), preface by Catherine Poulain, introduction by Laurent Girault-Conti, éd. Payot "Petite Biblio Voyageurs", 2018 (ISBN 2228920282)
- Les Vaisseaux du Hasard (poetry), limited edition, 2020.

Anita Conti authored many newspaper articles. Some examples include:

In l'Illustration:

- " Comment on découvre un nouveau fond de pêche ",
- " Sur les champs de pêche et sur les champs de mines ",
- " La pêche sur le front de mer ", ...

In Mer et Colonies, of the French Maritime and Colonial League:

- " Batiments de pêche et défense littorale "

In Neptunia, of the Association of Friends of the Musée de la Marina:

- " Requins ",
- " La vie obscure des bêtes océaniques ",
- " La Centième nuit à l'Ile de l'Ours ",
- " Hivernage au Pays des Eaux ",
- " Nuit de mer deep "...

== Bibliography ==
- La dame de la mer - Anita Conti (1899-1997), photographe, éd. revue Noire in collaboration with the association "Cap sur Anita Conti", 1998 (ISBN 2-909571-35-1)
- Michel Guerrin, "En Mer avec Anita Conti", Le Monde, 22 February 2003
- Catherine Reverzy, Anita Conti : 20 000 Lieues sur les mers, Odile Jacob, 2006 (ISBN 2738117422) Grand Prix de la Mer de l'Association des Ecrivains de la Langue Française
- Chabaud Catherine, Garnier Jean-Luc, Femme libre, toujours tu chériras la mer, Chasse-Marée, octobre 2007. (ISBN 2353570240)
- Alexandra Lapierre et Christel Mouchard Elles ont conquis le monde. Les grandes aventurières 1850-1950. Arthaud, Paris 2007 (ISBN 2081360659)
- Clotilde Leton, Anita Conti: Portrait d'Archives, Lopérec, Locus Solus, 2014 (ISBN 9782368330104)
- Clothilde Leton, Anita Conti, pionnière des Océans, Bretagne magazine histoire, mai 2014
- Maylis de Kerangal, On reprend. Anita Conti racle le réel, Le Monde, February 2017
- Catel Muller et José-Louis Bocquet, Anita Conti, Casterman, "Ecritures" collections, 2024 (ISBN 2203241632)
- Anita Conti, la Dame aux semelles de vent, Catalogue d’exposition au musée des Pêcheries Fécamp, Éditions des Falaises, 2024. (ISBN 978-2-84811-655-6)
- Pascale Nivelle, Entre la vieille "dame de la mer" Anita Conti et son admirateur, une histoire d'amour fusionnel, Le Monde, August 2024
- Frédéric Potet, Catel, autrice de bande dessinée "Anita Conti était une femme incroyable qui s'est libérée de ses chaines", Le Monde, september 2024

== Resources ==
- Gourden Marc, Anita Conti, une vie embarquée [DVD], Antoine Martin Production (Vivement Lundi!), France télévision pôle nord-ouest.
- Episode 4/4: Anita Conti, l'aventure en haute mer, Le cours de l'histoire episode on France Culture, June 2022.
- Catel, dessinatrice de BD: "Anita Conti, c'était une Paul Watson au féminin", Les Midis de Culture episode on France Culture, December 2024
- Anita Conti & Laurent Girault-Conti, le dernier amour de la dame de la mer, Les Histoires D'Amour Extraordinaires episode on Europe 1, December 2024
