= Galperine =

Galperine or Galpérine is a surname. Notable people with the surname include:

- Alexis Galpérine (born 1955), French violinist
- Evgueni Galperine (born 1974), Russian-French composer
