= Nicolas Chalvin =

French conductor and oboist

Nicolas Chalvin (born 1969) is a French contemporary conductor and oboist.

== Career ==
After studying music at the Conservatoire national supérieur de musique et de danse de Lyon, Nicolas Chlavin performed as an oboe-solo at the Orchestre national de Lyon and the Luxembourg Philharmonic Orchestra. He initially led a career as a chamber musician and orchestral musician, but transitioned to conducting after encouragement from Armin Jordan, of whom he was assistant, and Franz Welser-Möst. His career as conductor began in 2001 with Lucio Silla by Mozart in Lausanne and Caen.

Since then, Nicolas Chalvin has performed in concert at the head of orchestras in a repertoire ranging from early classics (Mozart, Haydn) to the latest contemporary works. He has been invited in particular by the Lausanne Opera chamber orchestra, the Orchestre philharmonique de Strasbourg, the Orchestre régional de Normandie, the Orchestre symphonique de Mulhouse, the Orchestre of Auvergne, the Orchestre symphonique de Bretagne, the Opéra national de Lorraine orchestra, the orchestre national de Lyon, the Luxembourg Philharmonic Orchestra, the Portuguese Symphony Orchestra and the Wurtemberg philharmonic orchestra.

Since September 2009, he has been music director of the Orchestre des Pays de Savoie.

== Direction and development of a chamber orchestra ==
The work accomplished with the Orchestre des Pays de Savoie was a new stage in his career. As permanent musical director, he undertook the development of this Haydn type formation. With collaborations that also allowed to expand the training during certain programs (particularly with the Orchestre de chambre de Genève), he developed the repertoire, new collaborations of artists and encouraged new creations or commissions for the orchestra, an institution that was also very active in the field of mediation and cultural transmission. In 2011, two new discographic releases and a tour in Russia were representative of the orchestra's new dynamism.

== Collaborations around new creations ==
The Orchestre des Pays de Savoie was the occasion for new creations on stage and on record. Nevertheless, the defence of new or unpublished operatic works is a mark of his career. In particular, he directed a new production of Niobé et Médée by Pascal Dusapin and Julie by Philippe Boesmans. On disc, he delivered the first recordings of the Sophie Arnould opera by Gabriel Pierné (Luxembourg Philharmonic Orchestra, label Timpani, nominated at the BBC Awards 2008 and Aucassin et Nicolette by Paul Le Flem with Bernard Tétu and the Orchestre des Pays de Savoie (label Timpani, 2011).

== Activity in the operatic field ==
After his debut in Lausanne ( Lucio Silla), commitments immediately followed at the Opéra de Lausanne, for Véronique by Messager and the Zürich Opera House for the La Belle Vie ballet then the following year Daphnis et Chloé by Ravel, with choreographies by Heinz Spoerli.

Since then, Nicolas Chalvin has performed in many opera houses directing works, and he has worked with directors such as Matthew Jocelyn, Alain Garichot, Stephan Grögler, Omar Porras, Jérôme Savary, Daniel Slater, Jean-Louis Martinoty, Moshe Leiser and Patrice Caurier: Don Pasquale by Donizetti, Orfeo ed Euridice by Gluck, Reigen by Philippe Boesmans, La vie parisienne by Offenbach, Carmen by Bizet at the Opéra de Lausanne, The Nose by Shostakovitch, The Rake's Progress by Stravinsky at Nantes-Angers Opéra, Maria Stuarda, L'elisir d'amore, Don Pasquale by Donizetti, L'italiana in Algeri by Rossini, A Midsummer Night's Dream by Benjamin Britten and Eugene Onéguin by Tchaikovski at the Théâtre de Caen, Véronique by Messager in Nancy and Rouen, Dolorès by André Jolivet and Rita by Donizetti in Rennes, Così fan tutte by Mozart at the Grand Théâtre de Genève, Les Troyens by Berlioz at the Tiroler Landestheater of Innsbruck.

Chalvin is very attached to collaborations with lyrical artists, and also attaches great importance to the programming of concerts that integrate lyrical pieces in recital, within the season of the Orchestre des Pays de Savoie, but also by regularly conducting concerts such as the final concert of the competition for lyric art of Clermont Ferrand.

== Discography ==
- Gabriel Pierné: Sophie Arnould with the Luxembourg Philharmonic Orchestra (Label Timpani)
- Paul Le Flem: Aucassin et Nicolette with the Orchestre des Pays de Savoie and the "Choirs and solosits of Lyon-Bernard Tétu" (Label Timpani 2011)
