= Éditions Nicolas Chaudun =

French publishing House

Éditions Nicolas Chaudun was a French publishing house formed by Nicolas Chaudun on 12 August 2004. It published exhibition catalogues and livres d'art on all areas of art history but especially photography and architecture, along with two collections of travel books.

It produced around twenty books a year, distributed by Actes Sud. Its authors included Jean-Pierre Babelon, Jean-Claude Carrière, Didier Rykner, Philippe Claudel, Marie Desplechin, Élise Galpérine, Jacques Merleau-Ponty and Arnauld Pontier. It was liquidated on 12 July 2014. ·
