= Nicolas Chaudun =

French writer

- Born: 1962 (age 63–64); Paris, France
- Occupations: Writer; art publisher; documentary director
- Writing career
- Language: French
- Genres: History, biography, essay, fiction
- Notable works: L'Été en enfer, Le Brasier
- Notable awards: Ordre des Arts et des Lettres

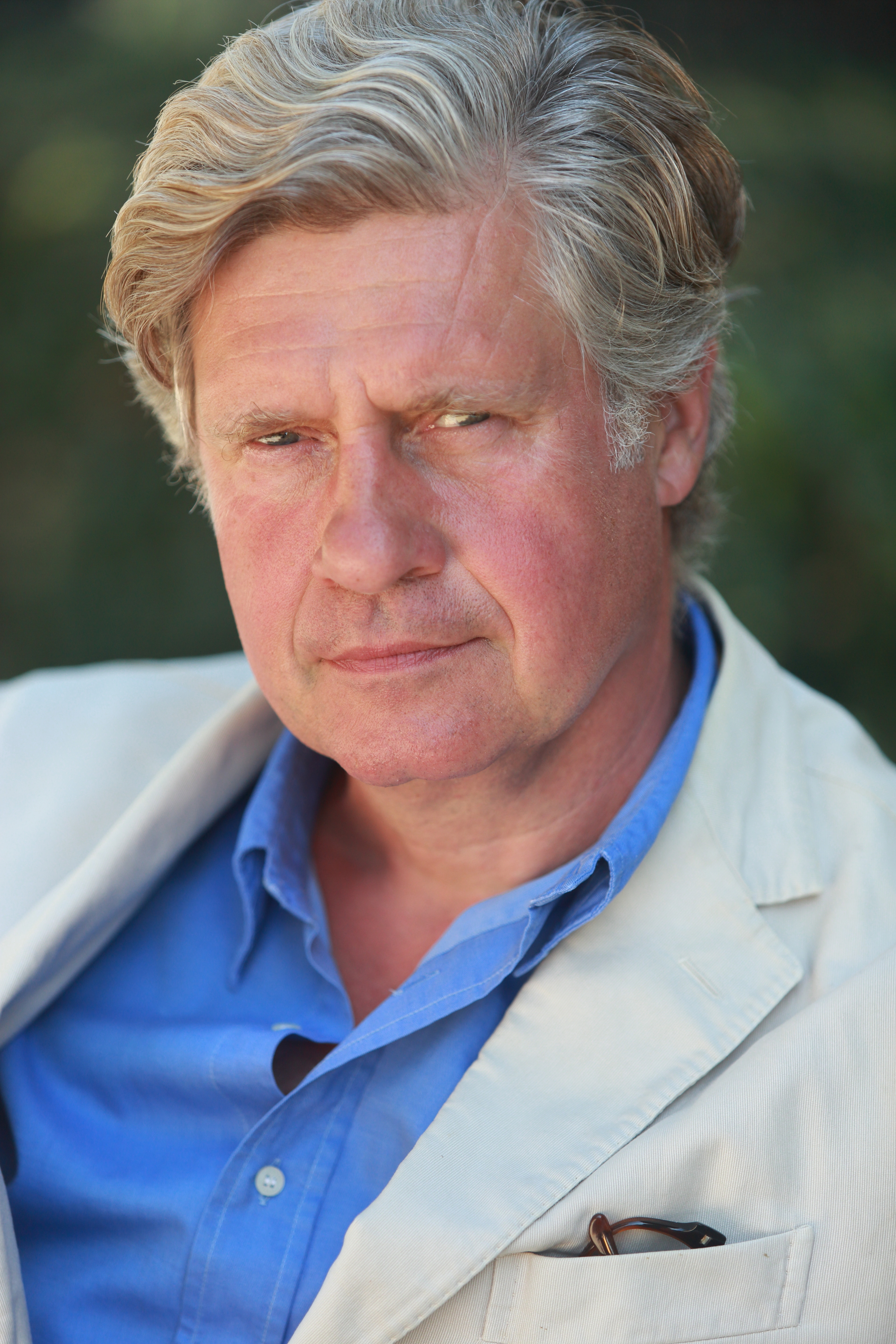

Nicolas Chaudun (born 1962) is a French writer, documentary director, and art publisher. He founded Éditions Nicolas Chaudun and has written works of fiction, essays, biographies, and historical narratives. He was appointed Knight of the Ordre des Arts et des Lettres in 2014 and promoted to Officer in 2020.

== Life ==
He was born in Paris, where he studied law and art history before a long stay in Equatorial Africa. He began his career as an art publisher at Aymery Somogy in 1988 before moving to Beaux Arts magazine in 1991. At the latter he became head of publishing in 1996. He was one of the founders of Éditions Phileas Fogg in 1999, mainly focussed on implementing the editorial policy of National Geographic France. Soon afterwards he set up a new publisher, Éditions Nicolas Chaudun, within which Phileas Fogg was only a collection of travelogues. Its new catalogue covered all areas of art history but particularly architecture and photography. Chaudun handed over the business and left it in April 2013 to concentrate on his writing.

In 1992 he published his first novel Le Siège. He has produced a pamphlet (Le Paysage, les ploucs et moi), a short story collection (Des nouvelles du front), an essay (La Majesté des centaures), a biography (Haussmann, Georges Eugène, préfet baron de la Seine; Un centaure au Crépuscule – Alexis L'Hotte) and a dark novel (Mortel Bouquet).

Several reviews have discussed his historical works, particularly ''L'Été en enfer'' and ''Le Brasier''. (L’Été en enfer; Le Brasier; La Nuit des aventuriers), with one reviewer writing that he brings to that field "an unparalleled originality and talent". L'Obs has stated "one cannot help but be dazzled by his passion, the richness of his style, his vertiginous erudition and his lack of pedantry. Alexandre Dumas' praise of Lamartine could also be applied to him : he raises history to the heights of the novel". In the opinion of Camille Pascal, a master of the genre, Chaudun "has, by his talent and his erudition, restored historical accounts to the literary nobility". His L'Été en enfer has won several awards and Lire magazine named his Le Brasier best history book of 2015 He also adapted Le Brasier for television himself in 2018.

He has also written and directed several television documentaries, notably Paris au beau temps des équipages, Le Pré des anges and Dandysme, le mal ultra, all co-produced with the Histoire TV chain. He has also been research commissioner for two exhibitions mainly covering the relationship between humanity and the horse in western society ('Voilà les Delton', musée de la Chasse et de la nature, October 2014 to January 2015 ; 'Des chevaux et des hommes – la collection Émile Hermès', musée de Pointe, Callières, Montréal, Canada, May–October 2016) and presenting regular features on art exhibitions on Historiquement Show on Histoire TV and in Figaro magazine.

== Publications ==
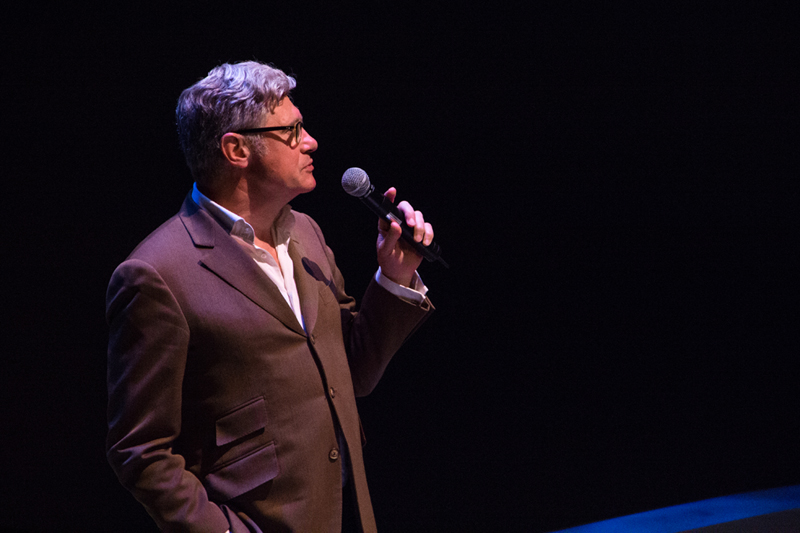
Nicolas Chaudun in Montréal, May 2016.

- Le Siège, roman, Les Belles Lettres, 1992
- L’Abécédaire de Paris, Flammarion, 1998
- Paris céramique, les couleurs de la rue, Somogy/Paris-Musées, 1998
- Le Paysage, les ploucs et moi, pamphlet, Rocher, 2001
- Le Promeneur de la petite ceinture, Actes Sud/Paris-Musées, 2003
- La Majesté des centaures, une histoire du portrait équestre dans la peinture occidentale, Actes Sud, 2006
- Le Cheval dans l’art (as contributor), Citadelles & Mazenod, 2008
- Haussmann, Georges Eugène, préfet-baron de la Seine, Actes Sud, 2009; Babel n°1169 (expanded republication of Haussmann au crible, Éditions des Syrtes, 2000)
- Paris et son double – Paris avant Haussmann ; Paris aujourd’hui, Éditions Nicolas Chaudun, 2010
- L’Été en enfer – Napoléon III dans la débâcle, history, Actes Sud, 2011; Babel n°1408
- Octave roi, novel, Pierre-Guillaume de Roux, 2013
- Des nouvelles du front, journalism, Le Passage, 2014
- Le Studio Delton, miroir du temps des équipages (as editor), Actes Sud, 2014
- Le Brasier : Le Louvre incendié par la Commune, history, Actes-Sud, 2015 ; Babel n°1736
- Un centaure au crépuscule. Alexis L’Hotte, Actes-Sud, 2016
- L’Île des enfants perdus, novel, Actes-Sud, 2019
- La Nuit des aventuriers, history, Plon, 2021 ; Pocket, 2023
- Mortel Bouquet, roman, Presses de la Cité, 2023

== Filmography ==
=== Writer ===
- Zone, zonards, zoniers... la horde de bordures; réal. Yves Billon – co-prod Zaradoc films / Histoire TV, 2014.
- Paris au beau temps des équipages; réal. Yves Billon / Nicolas Chaudun (non-crédité) – co-prod. Zaradoc films / Histoire TV, 2015.
- La Bastoche – la gouaille de la pègre et son fantasme; réal. Yves Billon – co-prod. Zaradoc / Histoire TV, 2016.
- La Ballade des rois; réal. Serge Tignières – co-prod Peignoir prod / Histoire TV, 2017.

=== Writer and director ===
- Le Pré des anges – la plaine d'Issy – berceau de l'aviation ; co-prod Plan large / Histoire TV, 2017.
- Le Brasier, le Louvre sous le feu de la Commune ; co-prod. Merapi productions / Histoire TV, 2018.
- Dandysme, le mal ultra ; co-prod. Merapi productions / Histoire TV, 2019.
- Et Haussmann créa Paris ; co-prod. Paramonti / Histoire TV, 2024.

== Awards ==
- Prix Pégase 2007 (for La Majesté des centaures).
- prix Drouyn-de-Lhuys (d) of the académie des sciences morales et politiques 2011 (for L'Été en enfer).
- Prix de la Fondation Napoléon 2011 (for L'Été en enfer).
- Prix Robert-Christophe 2012 (for L'Été en enfer).
- Prix du Guesclin – jury special prize 2015 (for Le Brasier).
- Le Brasier élu meilleur livre d'histoire 2015, palmarès from Lire.
- Prix ACF de l’Homme pressé, 2023 (Mortel Bouquet).
