= Claude Samuel =

French music critic (1931–2020)

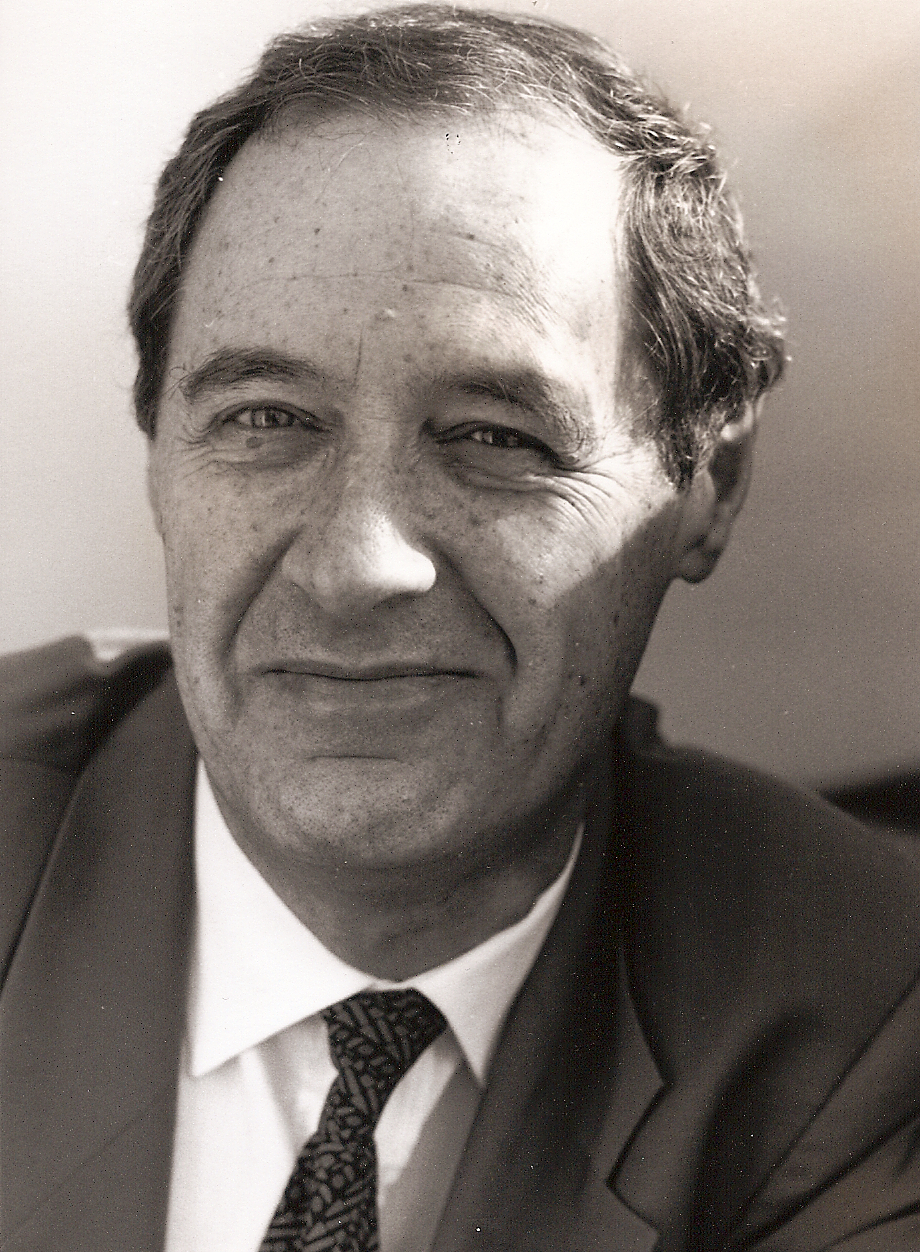
Claude Samuel (Guy Vivien)

Claude Samuel (23 June 1931 – 14 June 2020) was a French music critic and radio personality.

== Biography ==
Born in Paris, after medical studies and graduating as a dental surgeon, Samuel chose to devote himself to classical music journalism. He was a regular contributor to various newspapers of the daily press (Paris-Presse, from 1961 to 1970; Le Matin de Paris, from 1977 to 1987), of the weekly press (L’Express in 1959 and 1960; Le Nouveau Candide from 1961 to 1967; Le Point, from 1974 to 1989), the monthly press (Revue Réalités, and discs collection Philips-Réalités from 1957 to 1960) and the music press (Harmonie, Le Panorama de la Musique, Musiques, La Lettre du musicien, Diapason, where he has been responsible for the "Ce jour-là" column since 2001). He also commented on cultural news since 2007 until November 2018 in a weekly blog.

A producer of programs at the R.T.F. then at the O.R.T.F. (more than a thousand broadcasts from 1957 to 2007 for France Culture and France Musique), he was Director of Music (appointed under the presidency of Jean Maheu) from 1989 to 1996; in this capacity, he was vice-president of the Théâtre des Champs-Élysées.

Devoting an important part of his activity, in different forms, to contemporary creation, he was responsible for the programming of the Royan Festival from 1965 to 1972 and then, after a dispute with the Royan authorities, he continued this work in La Rochelle from 1973 to 1977.

Creator of the "Centre Acanthes", an annual educational session for young composers and performers held successively at the Conservatoire d'Aix-en-Provence (1977–1986), at the Chartreuse de Villeneuve-lez-Avignon (1987–2003) and then at the Arsenal de Metz (2004–2011), he has invited a number of leading figures of contemporary music to attend: (Karlheinz Stockhausen, Iannis Xenakis, György Ligeti, Henri Dutilleux, Witold Lutosławski, Mauricio Kagel, Pierre Henry, Luciano Berio, Olivier Messiaen, Pierre Boulez, Luigi Nono, Tōru Takemitsu, Elliott Carter, Sofia Gubaidulina, Helmut Lachenmann, György Kurtág, Péter Eötvös, Wolfgang Rihm). At Radio France, he created and directed the Festival Présences from 1991 to 1997.

Very committed in the field of musical competitions, Claude Samuel created and directed the Olivier Messiaen Competition for contemporary piano (1977–2007) and the Concours de violoncelle Rostropovitch (1977–2009). Samuel has directed the "Concours de la Ville de Paris" from 1990 to 2014 (flute competition Jean-Pierre Rampal, trumpet competition Maurice André, piano-jazz competition Martial Solal, luthiery and arcèterie competition Étienne Vatelot).

== Awards ==
- Officier of the Légion d’honneur (1985)
- Officier des Arts et des Lettres
- Officier of the Order of Merit (1993).

== Works ==
- Sergueï Prokofiev. Solfèges (in French). Paris: Éditions du Seuil. 1995. p. 222. ISBN 2-02-024580-9. OCLC 610818402. Samuel1995. (ed. reworked and extended)
- Panorama de l’art musical contemporain, Éditions Gallimard (1962)
- Entretiens avec Olivier Messiaen, Éditions Belfond (1967)
- Expanded edition under the title Olivier Messiaen – Musique et couleur
- Olivier Messiaen, nouveaux entretiens, Belfond, (1986)
- Permanences d’Olivier Messiaen - dialogues et commentaires, Actes Sud (1999)
- Olivier Messiaen/Le livre du Centenaire (in coll. with Anik Lesure), Symétrie (2008)
- Le Grand Macabre de Ligeti, Hubschmid and Bouret (1981)
- Éclats/Boulez, Ed. du Centre Georges Pompidou (1986)
- Pierre Boulez/Eclats 2002, Ed. Mémoire du Livre (2002)
- Interviews with Mstislav Rostropovitch and Galina Vishnevskaya, Éditions Robert Laffont (1983)
- Clara S./Les secrets d’une passion, Éditions Flammarion (2006)
