= Mildred Clary =

- Born: 7 February 1931; Paris
- Died: 18 November 2010 (aged 79)
- Occupation(s): Radio and television producer Musicologist; Lute player

Mildred Clary (7 February 1931 – 19 November 2010) was a French radio and television producer as well as a music writer.

== Biography ==
Mildred Clary (born as Mildred Kennard. Her father was the guitarist Deric Kennard) was born in Paris in a music lover family. Her English father made her discover the wealth of ancient lute music and her French mother was a pianist, a pupil of Ricardo Viñes and Marguerite Long. But she did not put herself to music until late. She began her career as a concertmaster on guitar and later on lute and played incidental music in the pit of The Old Vic Theatre of London.

She decided to leave England and settle in France. She asked the director of the Old Vic for recommendations to French directors. The latter sent him to Jean Vilar and Jean-Louis Barrault, who both hired her. For in the 1950s, she was one of the few in France to play the lute at a time when few factors were making such instruments. She met Countess Thibault de Chambure, founder of the "Société de musique d'autrefois" and future curator of the instruments museum of the Conservatoire de Paris, who lent her an original old instrument of her rich personal collection. Mildred Clary played under the direction of Pierre Boulez and Hermann Scherchen at the Domaine musical and participated in many stage music as lutist for Jean Vilar. In 1956, she recorded the hommage Le Tombeau de Claude Debussy, by Manuel de Falla, reissued in the anthology box set Les Introuvables de Manuel de Falla (EMI, 1996). During the 1950s and 1960s, she also made different recordings of early music for the lute, in solo or with singers (notably with the vocal ensembles of Philippe Caillard and Roger Blanchard, and with tenor Yves Tessier and soprano Chanterelle Lanza del Vasto for the records companies Erato Records, Ducretet-Thomson, Vega and Studio SM). In them, she displayed a very fine musical sensitivity.

In 1955, she became a producer of radio broadcasts for French radio and subsequently for France Culture and France Musique. She first produced a series entitled Poète prends ton luth ("Poet, take your lute") in which she intervened as an instrumentalist. She then abandoned the instrument for "physiological reasons" (joint and back pain), as she confided to Olivier Germain-Thomas on the programme "For intérieur", for France culture, aired in 2005) to focus only on the broadcasts she now hosted. The first series of the very numerous ones she produced on radio was Musica britannica. She was interested in the music of India (a country she loved and often visited) and Japan as well as composers of the twentieth century such as Jean Sibelius, Benjamin Britten, Olivier Greif, and conductors, great performers and music venues in Europe and around the world. She conducted interviews with painters, such as Jean Bazaine, or produced a culinary series entitled les Mets et les notes, for France musique, whose guests realized recipes in real time (cooking or preparation being "filled" by music related to the gastronomic theme). With her accomplice, the director Annie Roger, she delivered a very beautiful work, proposing very elaborate programs that nevertheless never lost the natural evocative of the report on the live, when she left the studios of the Maison de la radio.

On television, she notably produced Un ton au-dessus ("One Tone Above"), for the first channel of the Office de Radiodiffusion Télévision Française (1972–1973), La musique buissonnière, for France 3 (1975 to 1977), La Leçon de musique for TF1 (1976 to 1982) and Opus, for Arte (1989 to 1996). Her field of interest was very wide, Indian music (the great Indian filmmaker Satyajit Ray directed his Music lesson on music from northern India) to contemporary western music, jazz.

Claude Samuel, also a producer at France Musique, who was Director of Music at Radio France, recalls that during the Mozart year, she provided a daily program of which a CD was born, Mozart - la traversée ultime ("Mozart - The Ultimate Crossing"). She asked that a sentence by the Swiss theologian Karl Barth be inscribed on the CD cover:

I am not sure that the angels, when they are praising God, play the music of Bach; I am certain, however, that when they are among them, they play Mozart and that God loves especially to hear them...

Claude Samuel emphasizes in his homage, where he evokes

This voice tinged with a delicious English accent ... her vast culture, her perfectionism, her anxiety too, that Mildred Clary has continually proved that one could at the same time like Mozart, take an interest in musicians from India and Japan, and assiduously attending concerts of new music. And it was with this open-mindedness, and with the care of truth and detail that characterized her, that she became a musicologist.

Her colleague Renaud Machart paid hommage to Mildred Clary during a series Grandes figures ("Big Figures") from 20 to 24 December 2010 on France Musique.

== Works ==
- 2000: Georg Friedrich Haendel, with Jean-Claude Donda, illustré par Charlotte Voake - Gallimard Jeunesse/ Erato ISBN 2070542009
- 2002: Madeleine Milhaud - Mon XXe ISBN 2-913575-51-X
- 2005: George Gershwin - Une rhapsodie américaine, - Pygmalion ISBN 2-85704-963-3
- 2006: Benjamin Britten ou le mythe de l'enfance, - Buchet/Chastel ISBN 2-283-02183-9
- 2006: Mozart : La lumière de Dieu, with René de Obaldia ISBN 2-85704-882-3
- 2011: Hommage au pianiste catalan Ricardo Viñes (1875-1943) for Actes Sud

== Distinctions ==
1988 : Grand Prix de la radio, by the Société des gens de lettres

== Hommages ==
- Culture Minister Frédéric Mitterrand paid tribute to her by saying
  One of the key voices of France Culture and France Musique, which interviewed many figures of XXth music with this particular tact and talent. We all remember the long and moving radio exchanges, especially with Madeleine Milhaud about the life and works of the talented creators she knew so well how to make us appreciate.
