= Martine Bailly =

French cellist (born 1946)

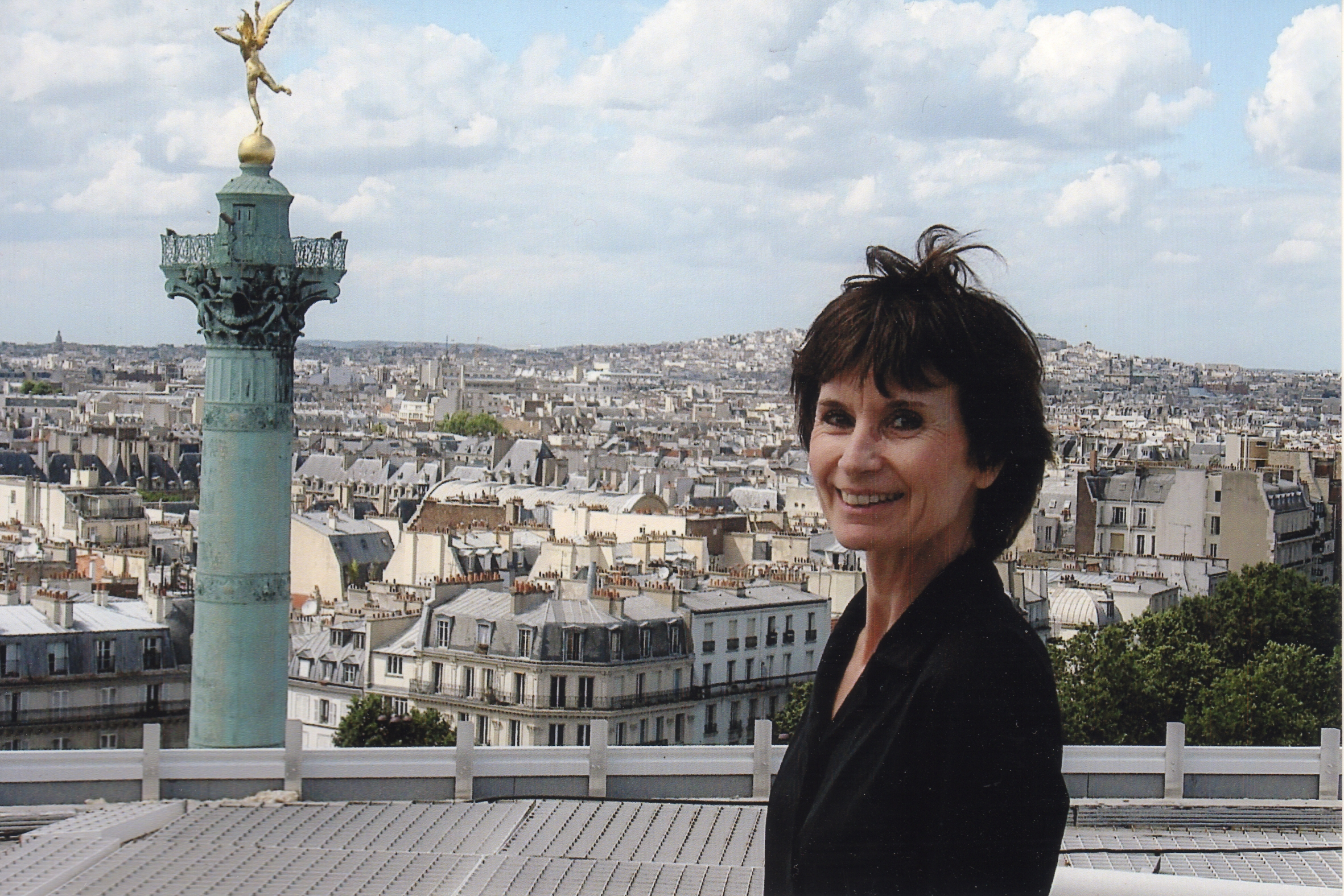
Martine Bailly in 2007, on the roof of the Opéra Bastille

Martine Bailly (born 1946) is a French classical cellist who held the position of supersoloist, principal first cello of the Orchestre de l'Opéra national de Paris for 26 years.

== Life ==
Bailly trained with Paul Tortelier at the Conservatoire de Paris and obtained a first prize for cello unanimously from the jury and a first prize for chamber music . She perfected herself in string quartet. She performed in several chamber and solo ensembles in many countries in Europe, America, Japan, Mexico and Russia. She then spent two years in the United States at the Yale University where she perfected her skills with Aldo Parisot, Janos Starker and Pierre Fournier. Upon her return to France, she developed a contemporary music activity, notably with the Ensemble intercontemporain and the Ensemble 2e2m.

She then joined the Orchestre de l'Opéra national de Paris as a supersoloist, first solo cello. She has played under the direction of Seiji Ozawa, Georges Prêtre, Daniel Barenboim, Pierre Boulez and Christoph von Dohnanyi. She performed Bach's Cello Suites during the French premiere of Jerome Robbins' ballet Suites of Dances at the Palais Garnier, which resulted in a half-hour program on Arte, where she accompanied alone the Star Dancer Nicolas Le Riche. She performed this ballet a second time in November 2014 at the Théâtre des Champs-Élysées, again with Nicolas Le Riche.

She was particularly noticed during the performance on stage of the solo of the second act of Die Frau ohne Schatten, under the direction of Robert Wilson, in Richard Strauss string sextet Capriccio, in Messian's Quartet for the End of Time at the Opéra Bastille, and more recently in the Ode to Napoleon Buonaparte, quintet by Arnold Schönberg with narrator, given on the stage of the Opera Garnier. She premiered the Crépuscule du Kol Nidré, a work for solo cello by Graciane Finzi, in November 2009 in Paris, as well as the Douze chants hébraïques by Jean-François Zygel, with the composer, in Paris in 2010. She has a career as a concertist, She was featured at the Adelaide International Cello Festival in Australia in April 2011.

After a career as a teacher at the Maurice Ravel Conservatory of the 13th arrondissement of Paris, she also gives master classes at several festivals in Europe, Israel and Australia. She is a cello teacher at the Schola Cantorum de Paris.
