= Biarritz Aquarium =

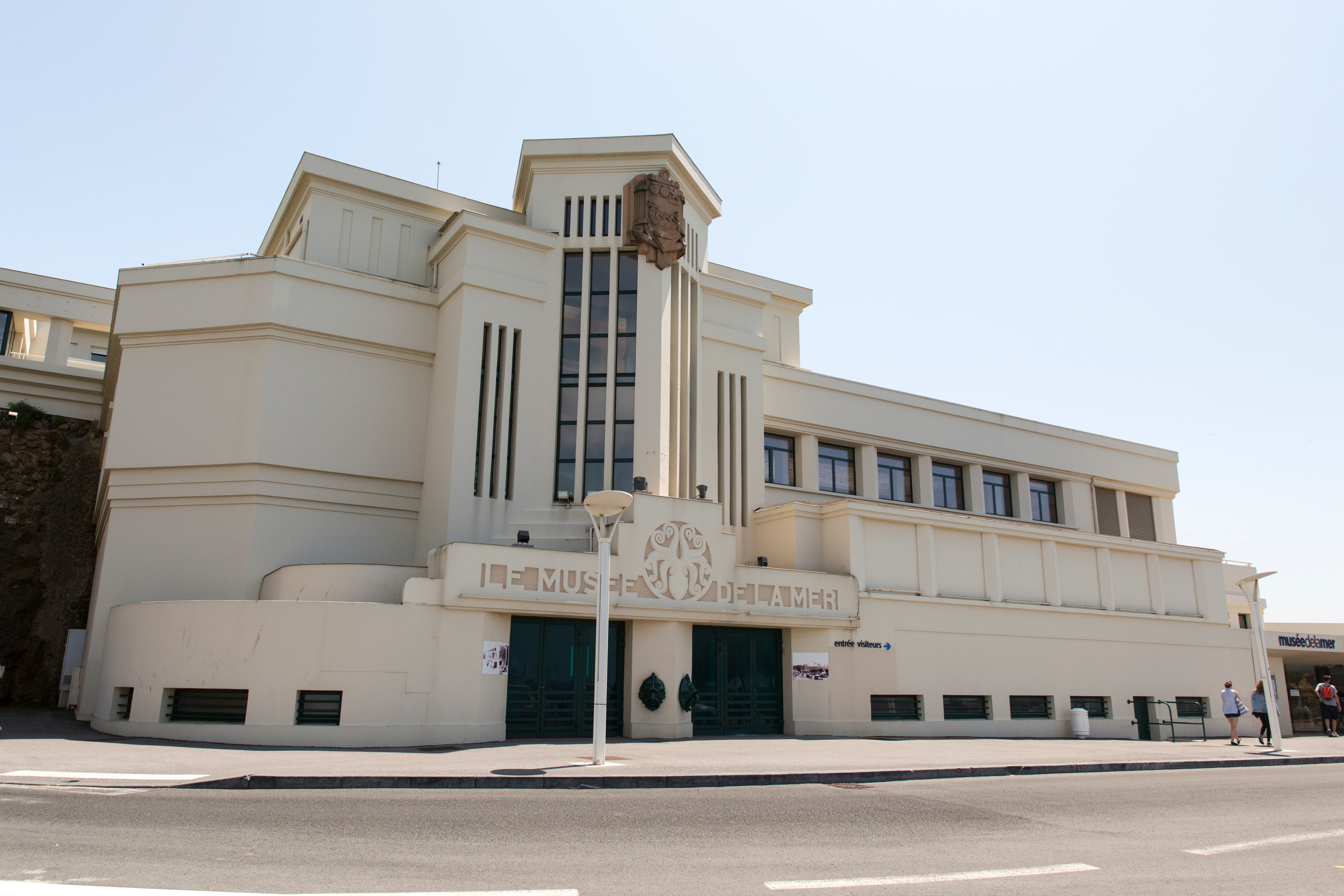
- Aquarium of Biarritz
- Interactive map of Biarritz Aquarium
- 43.483°N 1.5675°W
- Date opened: 10 August 1933
- Location: Esplanade du Rocher de la Vierge, 64200 Biarritz, France
- Floor space: 0.7 hectares (1.7 acres)
- Website: www.museedelamer.com

Biarritz Aquarium, also known as le Musée de la Mer (Museum of the Sea; Occitan: lo Musèu de la Mar; Basque: Itsas Museoa), is an aquarium in Biarritz. The building, in art deco style, was opened in 1933. It went through the first renovation in 1992 to add an important collection of marine animals. An extension was added between 2009 and 2011 which doubled the visiting area and added more tanks, at the expense of space for birds.

== The aquarium ==
The museum is laid out across 4 floors:

- various tanks of marine life from the Bay of Biscay
- information on fishing, cetaceans, and the history of whaling, as well as temporary exhibits
- the turtle tank the underwater part of the seal tank
- the terrace and the outdoor part of the seal tank, then with the extensions, includes the north Atlantic tanks, the Caribbean exhibit, the Indo-Pacific exhibit (including the shark tank), and the gift shop

== Gallery ==
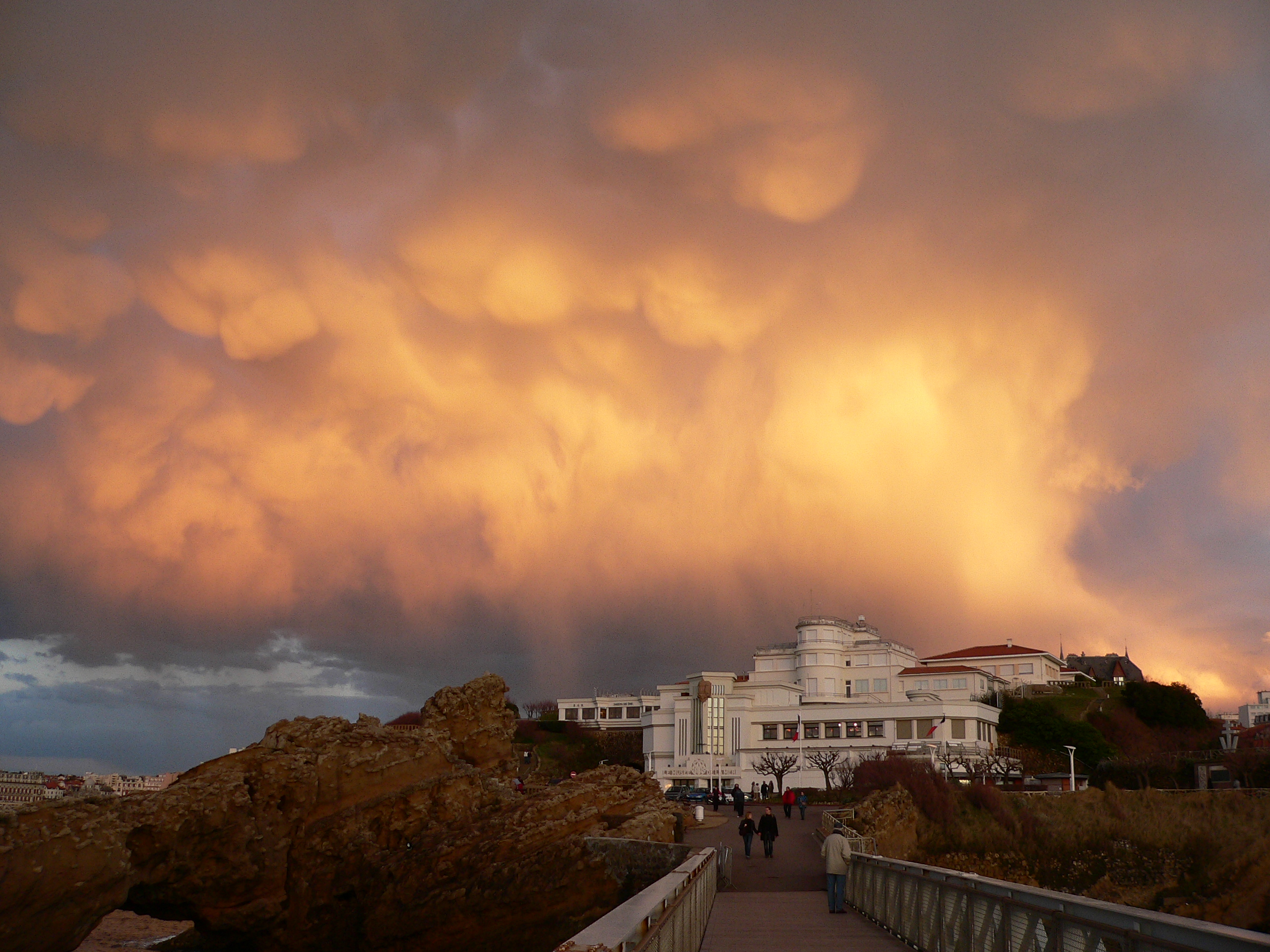

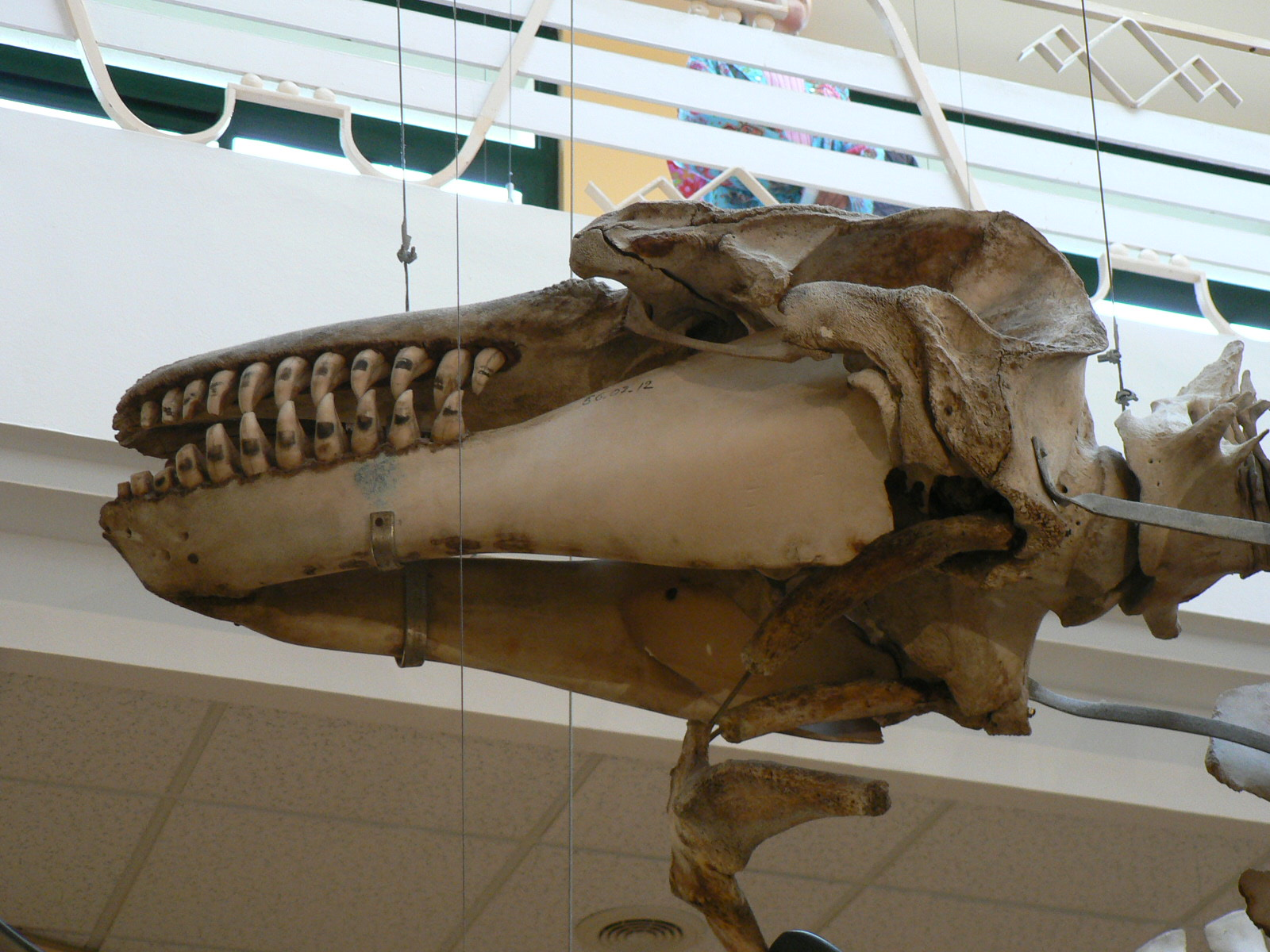

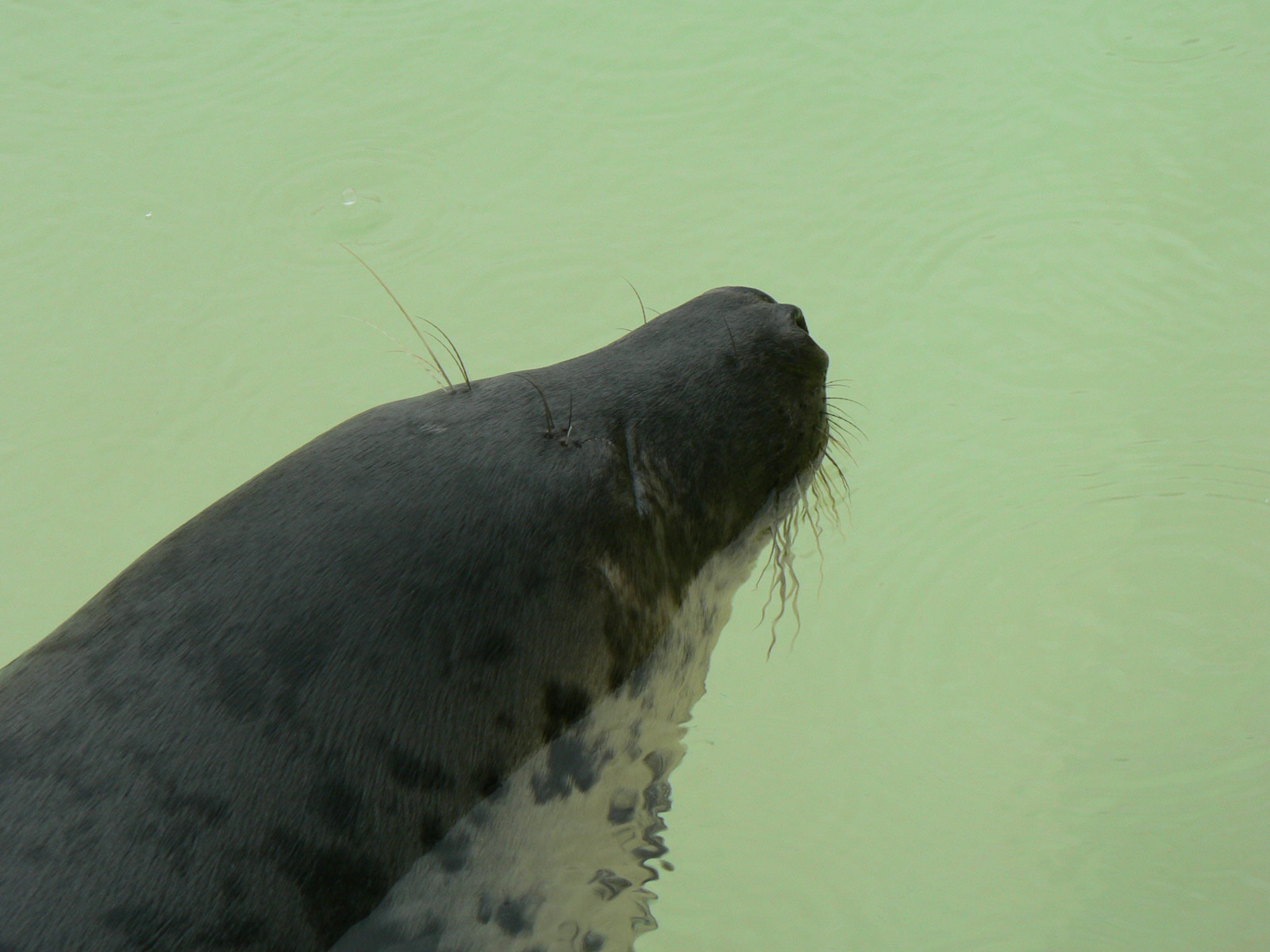

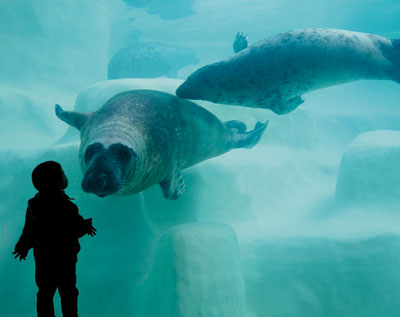

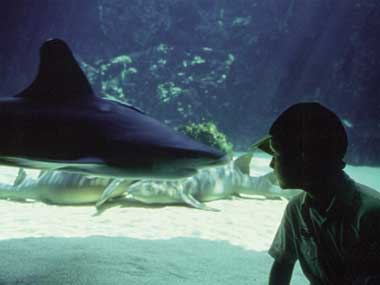

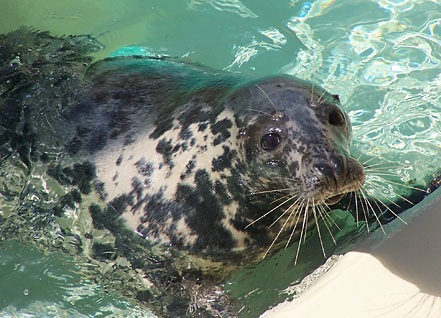

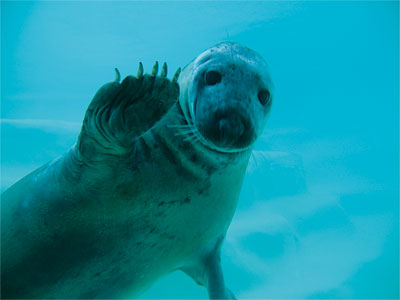
