= Philippe Blay =

French musicologist

Philippe Blay (born in April 1960) is a French musicologist.

== Publications ==
- (Dir.) Musée de la Musique : guide, Paris: musée de la Musique (Cité de la musique), Éditions de la Réunion des musées nationaux, impr. 1997, 271 p.
- (Dir. with Raphaëlle Legrand) Sillages musicologiques: hommages à Yves Gérard, Paris : C.N.S.M.D.P., 1997, 337 pages.
- L'Île du rêve de Reynaldo Hahn : contribution à l'étude de l'opéra français de l'époque fin-de-siècle, Villeneuve d’Ascq : Presses universitaires du Septentrion, 2000, 3 vol., coll. Thèse à la carte.
- « Grand Siècle et Belle Époque : La Carmélite de Reynaldo Hahn », in Aspects de l’opéra français de Meyerbeer à Honegger, coordinated by Jean-Christophe Branger and Vincent Giroud, Lyon: Symétrie, Palazzeto Bru Zane, cop. 2009, p. 153-170, series Perpetuum mobile.
- (Dir.) Reynaldo Hahn, un éclectique en musique, Arles: Actes Sud, Palazzetto Bru Zane, 2015, 504 p. Actes du colloque « Reynaldo Hahn : un éclectique en musique », Venise, Palazzetto Bru Zane – Centre de musique romantique française, 11-12 May 2011. Prix du temps retrouvé (Prix des Muses 2016).
- (In collab. with Jean-Christophe Branger and Luc Fraisse) Marcel Proust et Reynaldo Hahn: une œuvre à quatre mains, avant-propos d’Eva de Vengohechea, Paris: Classiques Garnier, 2018, coll. Bibliothèque proustienne, n^{o} 21.
