= Jérôme Naulais =

French trombonist and composer (born 1951)

Jérôme Naulais (born 1951) is a French trombonist and composer.

== Life ==
Born in 1951 into a family of musicians, he began studying music at the age of six.

He obtained his first prizes of violin and double bass at the Conservatoire National de Boulogne-Billancourt before starting the study of the trombone and obtaining the first medal of solfège (1970) and a first prize for trombone (1971) at the Conservatoire de Paris.

First soloist with the Orchestre national d'Île-de-France (from 1974 to 1976) and the Concerts Colonne (from 1975 to 1982), he has been, since its creation in 1976, soloist of the Ensemble intercontemporain directed by Pierre Boulez.

He devotes a significant part of his activity to teaching. After having taught trombone at the music schools of Antony, Fresnes, Sèvres and the École Nationale de Musique de Ville-d'Avray as well as in international academies (France, Belgium, Japan), he is now Director of the École de Musique du Club Musical de la Poste de Paris of which he was also the director of the concert band. He was also director of the Music School of Bonneuil-sur-Marne from 1980 to 1998.

He has participated in numerous studio and concert recordings with major international variety stars as a trombonist and arranger. (Charles Aznavour, Harry Belafonte, Marlène Dietrich, Gilbert Bécaud, Shirley Bassey, etc.).

Very early on, he moved into composition by writing works for chamber music, concert bands and symphony orchestras. Some of his works have been presented in Japan, USA, Canada and various European countries.

For his sixtieth anniversary, the Éditions Marc Reift (EMR) produced 7 CDs in 2011 dedicated to the work of Jérôme Naulais (Jérôme Naulais Portrait Volume 1 to 7 with the Philharmonic Wind Orchestra, the Marc Reift Orchestra, le Fun & Easy Band and the Prague Festival Orchestra directed by Marc Reift). A series bearing his name has also been published and includes more than 500 titles.

== Compositions ==
=== Works for orchestra ===
- 1999: Le vent des helices, for five trumpets and orchestra
- Dany boy, for string orchestra
- Divertimento Nº1, for string orchestra
- Donna, Donna, for orchestra
- Latitudes, for orchestra
- Salvador de Bahia, for string orchestra

=== Works for wind band, fanfare orchestra or brass band ===
- 1992: Amuse gueule, for wind orchestra
- 1992: Firerock, for wind orchestra
- 1994: Face à face, for wind quintet solo and wind orchestra.
- 1995: Caminos, for wind orchestra (with Alain Bodenes).
- 1995: Saxtory, for saxophone quartet and wind orchestra.
- 1997: Canta me la, for youth harmony orchestra
- 1999: Agitations, for wind orchestra
- 1999: Incandescens, for wind orchestra
- 1999: Le vent des helices, for five trumpets and wind orchestra
- 2002: Comic band, for wind orchestra
- 2002: La Galerie Mysterieuse, for wind orchestra
- 2002: Le Vent d'Autan, for wind orchestra
- 2002: Más alla del sol, for wind orchestra
- 2003: Engrenages, for large brass ensemble and percussion
- 2003: Parfum de Paris, for wind orchestra
- 2003: Russian Festival, for wind orchestra
- 2003: Tony, for bugle solo and wind orchestra
- 2003: Voyage au Japon, for wind orchestra
- 2004: Le vent d'autan, for wind orchestra
- 2005: Arcane I, for euphonium solo and wind orchestra
- 2007: La grande muraille, for wind band or fanfare orchestra
- 2007: La soupe aux choux, for wind orchestra
- 2008: Da Vinci Code, for wind orchestra
- 2009: Double Jeu, for trombone solo and wind band or fanfare orchestra
- 2009: Jeux Interdits, for guitar and wind band or fanfare orchestra also for piano and brass band
- 2009: Love Train, for wind orchestra
- 2009: Montmartre, for wind orchestra and strings
- 2009: Scotland the Brave, for wind orchestra
- 4 Fanfares, for wind band or fanfare orchestra
- À la belle époque, for trumpet and wind orchestra
- À la croisée des chemins, for fanfare orchestra
- Alma Latina, for wind orchestra
- Amor y Sol, for wind band or fanfare orchestra
- Anche ou démon, for wind band or fanfare orchestra
- Attention à la marche, for wind orchestra
- Bagatelles, for wind orchestra
- Canicule, for trumpet solo and wind orchestra
- Cap Tonic, for wind orchestra
- Celtic festival, for wind orchestra
- Chocs, for 4 percussionists solo and wind orchestra
- Circus Marche, for wind band or fanfare orchestra
- Conversations, for wind orchestra
  1. Ragtime
  2. Ballade
  3. Animando
- Cool paradise, for wind orchestra
- Danny boy, for youth harmony orchestra
- Dans un tourbillon d'eau perlée, for wind orchestra
- Downtown, for wind band or fanfare orchestra
- Embuscade, for wind orchestra
- Émotions, for wind orchestra
- Envol vers l'infini, for wind orchestra
- Étoile des profondeurs, for trombone and wind orchestra
  1. Allegro
  2. Ballade
  3. Final Allegro
- Évasion, for trumpet solo and wind band or fanfare orchestra
- Fantaisie Hongroise, for transverse flute, clarinet solo and wind orchestra
- Flamme and Co, for wind band or fanfare orchestra
- Flash-Opening, for wind orchestra
- Frissons, for alto saxophone solo and wind orchestra
- Histoire d'airs, for wind orchestra
- Hurricane, for wind orchestra
- Incandescens, for wind orchestra
- Intrigues, for wind orchestra
- Irish Story, for wind or fanfare orchestra with strings
- Jardin secret, for wind orchestra
- Key West, for solo instrument (transverse flute, oboe, clarinet, soprano/alto saxophone, trumpet or violin) and wind orchestra
- L'Âme de Notre Harmonie, for mixed choir and wind orchestra
- La Conquistadora, for wind orchestra
- La Cueva del Dragón, for bass trombone solo and wind orchestra
- Latitudes, for trombone and wind orchestra
- Le temps des cathédrales, for wind orchestra
- Long beach, for wind orchestra
- Lost Dream, for wind orchestra
- Lyrical Overture, for wind orchestra
- Made in brass, for brass quintet solo and wind orchestra
- Magie Noire, for wind orchestra
- Niagara Falls, for wind orchestra
- Oh happy day, for wind orchestra
- Olas de amor, for trumpet solo and wind orchestra
- Original Circus, for wind orchestra
- Piña Colada, for wind orchestra
- Pulsions, for 13 brass players and 4 percussionists
- Rock Number One, for wind orchestra
- Russian Overture, for wind orchestra
- Sax de voyage, for soprano saxophone (or tenor saxophone) and wind orchestra
- Sentimental Bossa, for wind orchestra
- Skyline, voor harmonie- of fanfareorkest of brassband
- Turbulences, for wind orchestra
- Une comédie slave, for wind orchestra
- Val Rock, for wind orchestra
- Valsissimo, for four bassoons and wind orchestra
- Vaya Chicos, for wind band, fanfare orchestra or brass band
- Vent d'Est, for wind band or fanfare orchestra
- Vibrations, for wind orchestra
- Vienna By Night, for wind orchestra
- Why not?, for wind orchestra

=== Vocal music ===
==== Works for choir ====
- La machine (en location), for voice and mixed choir

=== Chamber music ===
- 1984 Labyrinthe, for seven brass players (2 trumpets, 2 horns, 2 trombones, tuba) and percussion
- 1988 Cocktail, for trumpet ensemble
- 1988 Patchwork, for saxophone quartet
- 1989 Images, for seven brass players and 3 percussionists
- 1989 Mise à Sax, for saxophone quintet t
- 1992 L'homme aux 3 visages, for nine horns, trombone solo; transverse flute; 2 oboes; 2 clarinets; 2 bassoons and horn in F)
- 2002 Alma Latina, for transverse flute and piano
- 12 petites pièces variés, for euphonium and tuba
- A fa feutrés, for trombone and piano
- Arthur, for trompet and piano
- Au fond des bois, for euphonium and tuba
- Au Tyrol, for clarinet and piano
- Audrey... de ma blonde, for trombone and piano
- Basse température, for double bass and piano
- Blanches d'hautbois, for oboe and piano
- Brisamar, for cello and piano
- Brumes, for horn and piano
- Caprichos, for transverse flute and piano
- Ce Matin-la, for alto saxophone and piano
- Ce soir là, for cello and piano
- Conte d'antan, for clarinet and piano
- Cool trombone, album for trombone and piano
- Couleur du temps, for violin and piano
- Daminou, for trumpet and piano
- Dérapages, for four trombones and marimba
- Destination, for flute ensemble (with Alain Bodenes)
- Deux si deux la, for transverse flute and piano
- Douze duos variés, for two clarinets
- Échappée clandestine, for violin and piano
- Écrin de rosée, for alto saxophone and piano
- Empreintes, for trombone and piano
- En quête du temps perdu, for clarinet and piano
- En revenant de Nohant, for transverse flute and piano
- Escapades, for trumpet ensemble (10 trumpeters).
- Filés de sol, for violin and piano
- Fulgurans, for trumpet ensemble
- Gentleman charmeur, for tuba and piano
- Grave décision, for double bass and piano
- Heureux comme un basson sur l'eau, for bassoon and piano
- Hier et aujourd'hui, for trombone and piano
- Influences, for 2 trumpets, 2 horns, 2 trombones and tuba
- Irish Coffee, for clarinet and piano
- Jazz Suite, version for 2 trumpets, 2 horns, 2 trombones tuba and percussion
- Jeu Totem, for horn and piano
- Juste un rêve, for violin and piano
- Kansax-city, for alto saxophone and piano
- La Basse du roi, for double bass and piano
- La Cabane d'Hippolyte, for cello and piano
- La Canne de Provence, for clarinet and piano
- La Corde rêve, for double bass and piano
- La fille des sables, for alto saxophone and piano
- La petite sirène, for transverse flute and piano
- La Place Rouge, for trumpet and piano
- La Toupie, for xylophone and piano
- La-Mi calmant, for viola and piano
- Lady Pily, for clarinet and piano
- Latin District, for 6 trombones and 2 bass trombones
- L'Étrange Napolitaine, for trombone and piano
- Le Baladin, for horn and piano
- Le Jardin sur la lagune, for horn and piano
- Le Piège de Calpe, for trombone and piano
- Le tabou'ré, for bassoon and piano
- Les Balanciers, for horn and piano
- Les Humeurs de Pierrot, for transverse flute and piano
- Let's Bone March, for 7 trombones
- Ma première romance, for violin and piano
- Marie-Caramel, for alto or tenor saxophone and piano
- Menu à la quarte, for trombone and piano
- Message secret, for clarinet and piano
- Nara, for transverse flute and piano
- Natalina, for clarinet and piano
- Neige sur la Forêt Noire, for clarinet and piano
- Noctavia, for bassoon and piano
- Nuit Cosaque, for trombone and piano
- Oasis, for clarinet and pinao
- Obsessions 6, for 5 brass players and 4 percussionists
- One Bone Show, for trombone and piano
- Opéracor, for horn and piano
- Pain d'épice, for alto or tenor saxophone and piano
- Paseando, for trombone and piano
- Pastel, for trombone and piano
- Petit navire, for viola and piano
- Petit Train, for trumpet (or clarinet) and piano
- Petite Suite Latine, for alto saxophone and piano
- Petites ondes, for alto saxophone and piano
- Popbone, for trombone and piano
- Premier regard, for clarinet and piano
- Prise de bec, for clarinet and piano
- Promenade lyonnaise, for trumpet and piano
- P'tit Jules, for trumpet and piano
- Quatre à quatre, for trombone and piano
- Regard dore, for trumpet and piano
- Rock à Charnay, for trumpet and piano
- Safari, for trombone and piano
- Sax symbole, for alto saxophone and piano
- Sax trotter, for saxophone and piano
- Soirée d'été, for violin and piano
- Souviens toi, for oboe and piano
- Steph et Lisa, for alto saxophone and piano
- Sur le chemin du clair matin, for transverse flute and piano
- Sur le ton de la confidence, for vioa and piano
- Tapas nocturnes, for alto saxophone and piano
- Toquades, for clarinet quartet and drum kit.
- Triangle Austral, for 8 brass players and percussion
- Un instant d'égarement, for trumpet and piano
- Un jour à Saint Flour, for trombone and piano
- Un matin de Printemps, for trumpet and piano
- Va-et-vient, for percussion and piano
- Vacances aux Antilles, for trombone and piano
- Vacances en Bourgogne, for alto or tenor saxophone and piano
- Vertiges, for brass quintet.
- Via Mexico, for trumpet and piano
- Zazou dans le tortillard, for trumpet and piano
- Zoom, for brass quintet

=== Works for piano ===
- 12 recreations pour jeunes pianistes
- Au Pays Celte
- Aventure Nocturne
- Manolo
- Nino
- Nostalgia
- Petit Démon
- Rêverie d'un soir
- Sahara
- Scotty
