= Patrice Fontanarosa =

French violinist (b.1942)

Patrice Fontanarosa (born 4 September 1942 in Paris) is a French classical violinist.

== Early life ==
Fontanarosa is the elder son of the painters Lucien Fontanarosa (1912-1975) and Annette Faive-Fontanarosa (1911-1988).

== Education ==
In 1959, Fontanarosa earned a music diploma with first prize in violin from Conservatoire de Paris.

== Career ==
- Solo violin of I Virtuosi di Roma
- 1976 to 1985, concertmaster of the Orchestre national de France
- Music director of the Orchestre des Pays de Savoie when it was created in 1984
- Violinist of the Fontanarosa

Fontanarosa formed the famous Fontanarosa Trio with his sister Frédérique Fontanarosa, pianist, and their brother Renaud Fontanarosa, cellist.

== Teaching ==
- Academic at the Conservatoire de Paris
- Academic at the Schola Cantorum de Paris

== International prizes and awards ==
- Villa Lobos in Rio de Janeiro
- Enesco in Bucarest
- Kreisler in Liège
- 1965: 6th prize of the Long-Thibaud-Crespin Competition in Paris
- Ginette Neveu competition in Paris
- 1967: 3rd prize of the Paganini Competition in Genoa
- 1995: Victoire de la musique; best Instrumental soloist for the CD Le Violon de l'Opéra

== Actor ==
Cinema

- 1971: Jo by Jean Girault as the violinist

Television

- 1975: Les Compagnons d'Eleusis by Claude Grinberg

== Personal life ==
Fontanarosa is married to harpist Marielle Nordmann.
