= Arnauld Pontier =

French writer

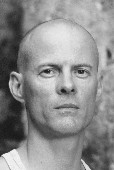
:Arnauld Pontier, juillet 2001

Arnauld Pontier is a French writer.

He was born in Valenciennes and spent his childhood and adolescence in Laos and in Algeria. A fan of comic books and science fiction as a child, he started writing poetry at the age of 14. He has mentioned his admiration for sci-fi writers such as Sturgeon and Asimov, as well as 19th century greats like Zola, Balzac and Flaubert.

Influenced by the latter, he engaged with the historical novel in his early work. The Thirteenth Target (Actes Sud) won the Marguerite Yourcenar prize in 2004; the author has stated that this work was partially autobiographical. He has since written several works of science fiction; his work also reflects his fascination with pulp and pop culture.
