= Jacques Drillon =

French journalist and writer (1954–2021)

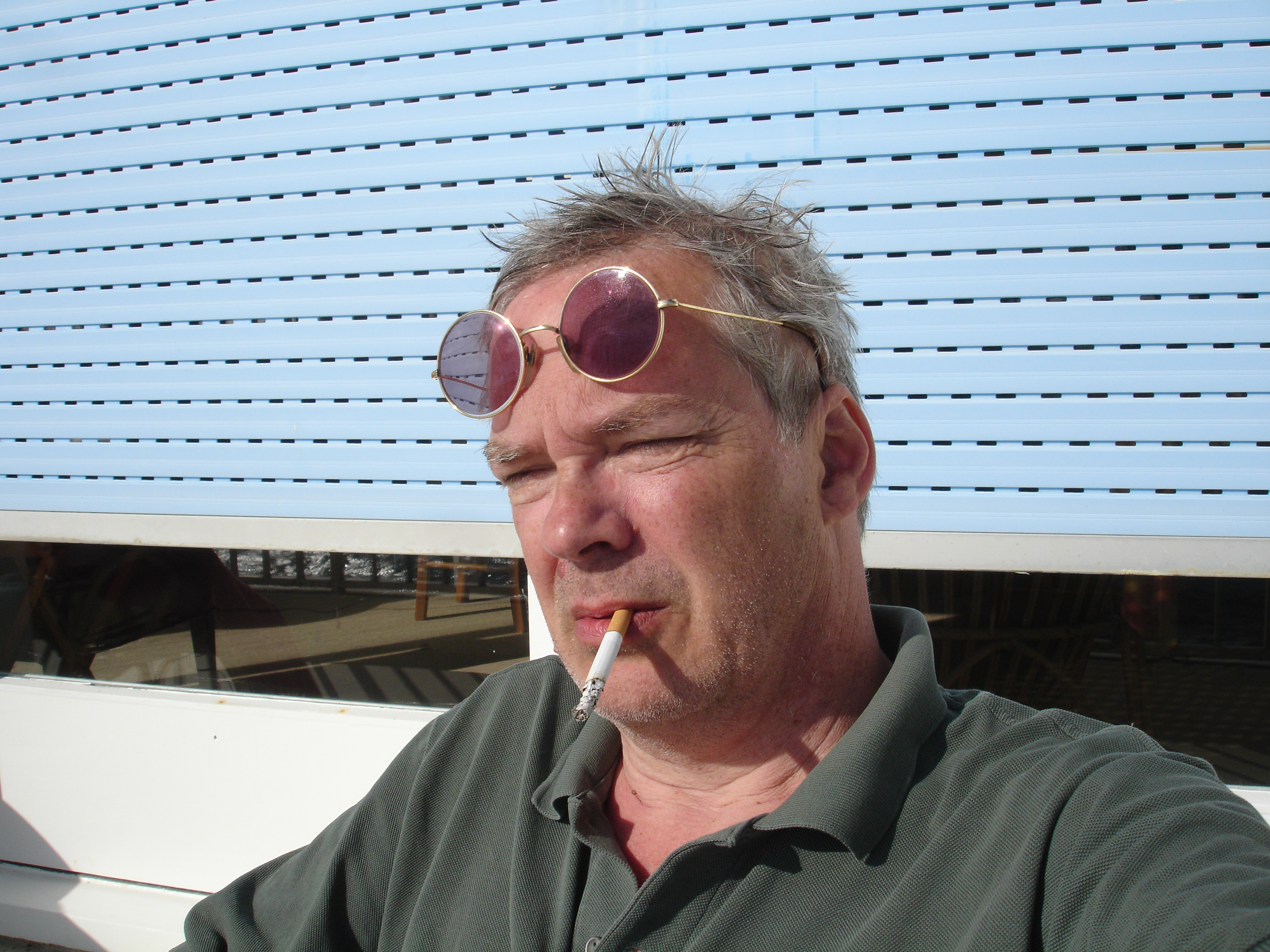
- Drillon in 2021
- Born: 25 June 1954; 15th arrondissement of Paris, France
- Died: 25 December 2021 (aged 67)
- Occupations: Journalist; Writer

Jacques Drillon (25 June 1954 – 25 December 2021) was a French journalist and writer. He studied literature and cinema in Nancy and Metz and earned a doctorate in linguistics in 1993 with the thesis La loi formelle et son influence sur la création artistique et littéraire. From 1997 to 1999, he taught linguistics at Cergy-Pontoise University, stylistics at Paris 8 University Vincennes-Saint-Denis, and gave conferences at the École Polytechnique.

== Life and career ==
From 1973 to 1975, Drillon published his first series of film critiques in a local newspaper, L'Écran lorrain. In 1975, he moved to Paris and became a producer at France Musique. He earned a sound engineering internship with the Institut national de l'audiovisuel and resigned from France Musique in 1977. In 1978, he joined the newly formed Monde de la musique monthly magazine. From 1982 to 1984, he served as its head of service. In 1981, he took over the classical music section of Le Nouvel Observateur from Maurice Fleuret. From 1983 to 1985, he wrote a musical column in the monthly magazine Tintam'arts, run by TF1. In 1995, he founded the monthly magazine Symphonia and served as its director until 1997.

Drillon contributed to various notable newspapers across France, such as Le Figaro, Le Monde, Libération, and others. In 2003, he took over the crossword section of Le Nouvel Observateur, previously run by Robert Scipion. On 17 August 2016, he published Vingt-sept cartes postales à Alain Cavalier on BibliObs, the online edition of Le Nouvel Observateur, now called L'Obs. On 1 March 2017, he announced his departure from L'Obs, which came into effect two months later.

He died of an oligodendroglioma on 25 December 2021, at the age of 67.

== Publications ==
- Le veilleur (1984)
- Notes de passage (1986)
- Liszt transcripteur ou La charité bien ordonnée (1986)
- Le livre des regrets (1987)
- Schubert et l'infini : à l'horizon le désert (1988)
- Traité de la ponctuation française (1991)
- Charles d'Orléans ou Le génie mélancolique (1993)
- Eurêka, généalogie et sémantique du verbe « trouver » (1995)
- Tombeau de Verlaine (1996)
- Children's corner (1997)
- De la musique (1998)
- Propos sur l’imparfait (1999)
- Les gisants (2001)
- Le quiz de l’Obs (2001)
- Face à face (2003)
- Liszt transcripteur ou la charité bien ordonnée suivi de Schubert et l'infini : à l'horizon, le désert (2005)
- Mort de Louis XIV (2006)
- Sur Leonhardt (2009)
- Six érotiques plus un (2012)
- Les mots croisés de l'Obs (2012)
- Les fausses dents de Berlusconi (2014)
- Mots croisés diaboliques (2015)
- Théorie des mots croisés (2015)
- Nouveaux mots croisés diaboliques (2017)
- Cadence (2018)
- La musique comme paradis (2018)
- Le cul rose d'Awa (2020)
- Derniers mots croisés diaboliques (2021)
- Gide et la crapette (2021)
