= Bernard Tétu =

French choir and orchestra conductor (born 1944)

Bernard Tétu (born 1944) is a French choir and orchestra conductor. He regularly conducts numerous symphony orchestra and ensembles of contemporary and early music: the Orchestre de Bordeaux, the Orchestre National de Lyon, the Orchestras of Auvergne, Brittany and Provence-Côte d'Azur, La Grande Écurie et la Chambre du Roy, the Orchestra of the Opéra national de Lorraine, the Philharmonie de Lorraine... He has also conducted orchestras abroad.

In 1979, he founded the Chorus of the Orchestre national de Lyon and conducted the professional vocal ensemble Les Solistes de Lyon. He has also conducted several important French choirs (Chœur de Radio France, Groupe vocal de France…).

He has recorded more than thirty-five CDs and in particular made the world's first recordings of Gabriel Fauré's La Naissance de Vénus, and Felix Mendelssohn's Athalie.

Tétu has brought to light many unpublished works of early and contemporary music. After the first auditions of Purcell's King Arthur and of the Llibre Vermell de Montserrat, he is responsible for the restitution and first recordings of works by Marc-Antoine Charpentier and Marc'Antonio Ingegneri, as well as the premieres of works by Antoine Duhamel, Gilbert Amy, Mauricio Kagel, Maurice Ohana, Jean Françaix, Philippe Hersant…

He regularly participates in international competition juries. At the Conservatoire national supérieur de musique et de danse de Lyon he has created the first class in France for the training of professional choral conductors: about sixty choral conductors from his class are currently posted in France or abroad.

Tétu is Commandeur of the Ordre des Arts et des Lettres, a member of the Academy of Sciences, Humanities and Arts of Lyon.
