= Benoît Menut =

French composer

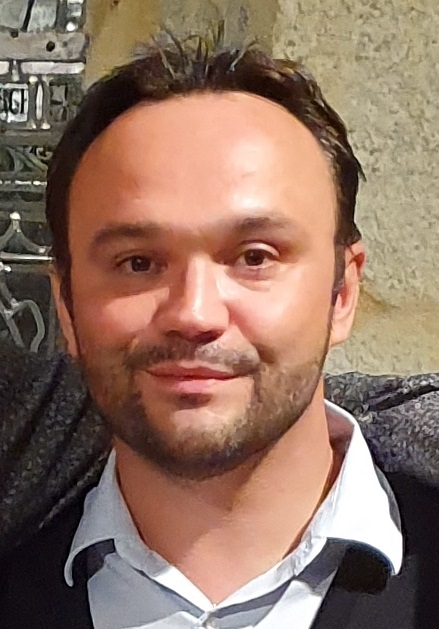
Benoît Menut

Benoît Menut born in Brest (1977) is a French composer of contemporary music.

== Publications ==
- Joseph-Guy Ropartz, with Mathieu Ferey, 2005, Éditions Papillon ISBN 2-940310-25-4

== Discography ==
- Monologue(s): Trio In memoriam Olivier Greif; Le baiser de marbre noir; Le monologue d'Anna - Ensemble Accroche Note (March 2012, Sonogramme) OCLC 858154527
