= La Lettre du musicien =

French music magazine

La Lettre du musicien is a periodical music magazine published in Paris, France, fifteen times a year for music professionals. Created in 1984, it is devoted to classical and electroacoustic music and reports on current musical events in France in this field as well as on pedagogy. Once a year, it publishes a special edition dedicated to the piano.
