= Luis Fernando Rizo-Salom =

- Born: Luis Fernando Rizo Salom; December 6, 1971; Cali, Valle del Cauca, Colombia
- Died: 21 July 2013 (aged 41); Chartres, France
- Education: Conservatoire de Paris, Pontifical Xavierian University
- Occupations: Composer, hang glider

Luis Fernando Rizo-Salom (6 December 1971 – 21 July 2013) was a Colombian composer of contemporary classical music who lived and worked in Paris since 1999. He was also a high performance athlete, member of the French hang gliding team.

== Biography ==
Rizo-Salom obtained a master of composition at the Javeriana University in Bogotá in 1998. In 1999, he decided to come to France to continue his studies with Emmanuel Nunes at the Conservatoire de Paris. Interested in computer music and new technologies, he followed the curriculum composition and computer music at IRCAM in 2005 where he made Big Bang for viola and electronics.

Between 2005 and 2007 he was composer in residence at the Casa de Velázquez in Madrid. He also received support from institutions such as the Nadia and Lili Boulanger Foundation, the Colombian government, the Academy Villecroze, foundations Meyer, Tarrazi, Legs St. Paul, and the Georges Wildenstein (Academy of Fine Arts). His works were commissioned by the Concert Hall Shizuoka (Japan), the French ministry for culture, the Orchestre national d'Île-de-France, the Festival du Larzac, the SACEM, the IRCAM, Radio France and Steirisches Kammermusik Festival (Austria).

He received awards from the Salabert Prize Foundation in 2004, the Prix International Forum for Young Composers in 2002 (Canada), the Prize of the University of Évry, Premio Paso al Arte (Colombia).

His work included chamber works, orchestral and electroacoustic compositions played in several contemporary music festivals in Colombia, France, England, Russia, Austria, Italy, Portugal, Spain, Germany and Canada, and broadcast by national radio Canadian, French and Colombian. His work was interpreted by leading ensembles and soloists such as Ensemble Intercontemporain, ensemble Court-Circuit, Ensemble l'Itinéraire, Ensemble 2e2m, Nouvel Ensemble Modern, New Music Studio (Russia), Remix (Portugal), the Orchestre national d'Île-de-France and Christophe Desjardins, Peter Rundel, Mark Foster, Lorraine Vaillancourt, Jean Deroyer, Pascal Rophé, Susanna Mälkki, and Pierre Roullier.

In 2013 a monographic CD with his works of chamber music was released, produced and financed by the Luis Angel Arango Concert Hall in Bogotá, with the support of the Bank of the Republic (Colombia).

Rizo-Salom died in a hang-gliding accident, a sport in which he was champion of France in 2011.

== Selected compositions ==
Year	Work	Composed for	Duration (in minutes)	Publisher
1994	Dos miniaturas	flute solo		unpublished
1995	Fonodia	piano solo		unpublished
1997	Ritual	brass and percussion,		unpublished
1997	Sombra	soprano, flute, clarinet, bassoon and percussion	8	unpublished
1997	Variaciones	percussion and piano		unpublished
1998	Metamorfosis	orchestre	9	unpublished
2000	Glide	electroacoustic	6	unpublished
2001	Cumulus	flute, violin, cello and piano	10'59	unpublished
2002	Al umbral del abismo	piano and ensemble	17'35	unpublished
2003	Invenciones invisibles	piano solo	11'04	BabelScores
2004	3-D	grand ensemble	10	unpublished
2004	Fabulas	electroacoustic	1.30	unpublished
2004	Torrente	bass and ensemble	~9	unpublished
2005	Big Bang	viola and live electroacoustics	10	unpublished
2005	Fabrica de fabulas	orchestra		unpublished
2005	Red Snow	electroacoustic	4	unpublished
2006	Fabulas sobre fabrica de fabulas	orchestra	~11	unpublished
2006	La ventana de quimeras	violin, viola, cello and piano	6'08	Le Chant du Monde
2007	El laberinto de minotauro 2	ensemble	10'30	unpublished
2007	El laberinto de minotauro	ensemble	6	unpublished
2009	Trois manifestes	electronic ensemble	27	unpublished
2010	[K]nock [O]ut	ensemble	14'20	Le Chant du Monde
2011	El Juego	bass flute, percussion, piano, viola and cello	12'14	Le Chant du Monde
2011	Fluxus	baritone saxophone solo	5'16	BabelScores
2012	In/Out	bass flute solo	6	Le Chant du Monde
2013	Quatre pantomimes pour six	flute, clarinet, horn, violin, viola and cello	12	Le Chant du Monde
2013	Rhizomes	percussion	unfinished	unpublished
