= Lii Tedre =

Estonian actress (born 1944)

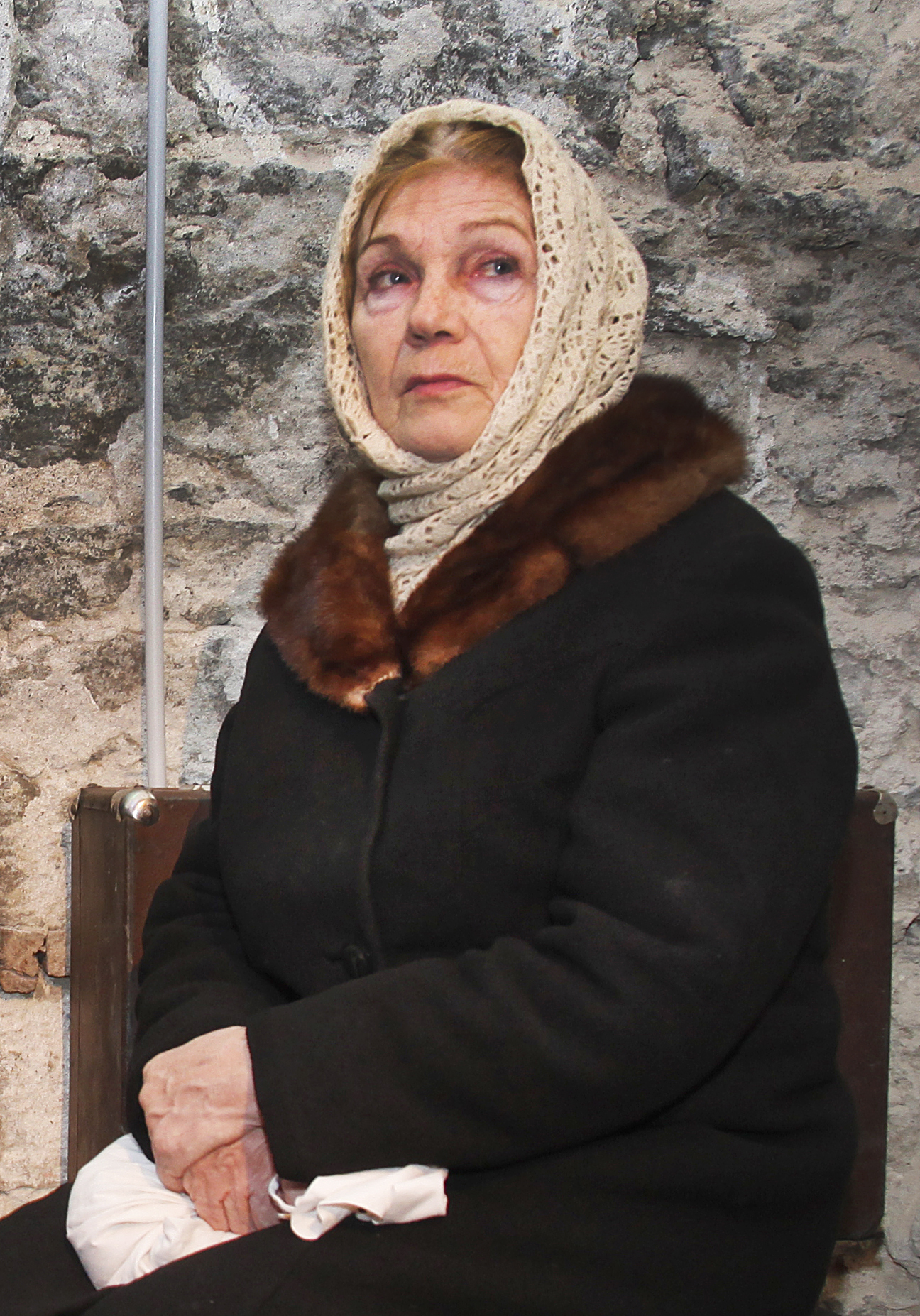
- Tedre in 2014
- Born: Lii Mander; 10 October 1944 (age 81); Tallinn, then part of Estonian SSR, Soviet Union
- Other name: Ly Tedre
- Citizenship: Estonian
- Occupation: Actress
- Years active: 1968–present
- Spouse: Peeter Tedre (m. 1971; died 2020)

Lii Tedre (born Lii Mander; 10 October 1944) is an Estonian stage, television, and film actress. Tedre began her career with an engagement at the Endla Theatre in 1968, before leaving in 2010 to become a freelance actress.

== Early life and education ==
Lii Tedre was born Tallinn during World War II, shortly after the Soviet reoccupation of Estonia. Her father was a driver and her mother was a manual labourer. She attended schools in Tallinn, graduating from Tallinn 8th Secondary School in 1964. Afterward, she enrolled at the ESSR Theatre Association Performing Arts Studio in Tartu, graduating in 1969. Her diploma production roles include Vera in Maxim Gorky's The Last Ones and Murike in Egon Rannet's Kriminal Tango and Very Decent People.

== Career ==
=== Theatre ===
In 1968, Tedre began an engagement as an actress at the Endla Theatre in Pärnu that would last forty-two years, before departing to become a freelance actress in 2010. Tedre has, however, returned to the stage of the Endla Theatre frequently since departing as a guest actress. Notable performances throughout her career with the Endla Theatre have included roles in works by such varied international authors and playwrights as: Astrid Lindgren, Agnieszka Osiecka, Alexander Ostrovsky, Brecht and Weill, Shakespeare, Thornton Wilder, Lope de Vega, Daphne du Maurier, Leo Tolstoy, György Spiró, Joseph Stein, Carl Erik Soya, Michel Tremblay, Jerome Kern, Selma Lagerlöf, Charles De Coster, Ernest Thompson, Wendy Kesselman, Molière, Inga Ābele, Shelagh Stephenson, John Millington Synge, Kenneth Lonergan, Jon Fosse, Eric-Emmanuel Schmitt, Kaite O'Reilly, Ronald Harwood, Patrick Hamilton, Sławomir Mrożek, and Israel Horovitz. Among his more memorable performances in roles by Estonian playwrights and authors include those of: August Kitzberg, Ott Kool, Oskar Luts, Hella Wuolijoki, Rein Saluri, Olaf Kopvillem, August Gailit, Martin Algus, and Heidi Sarapuu.

Additionally, Tedre performed in variety theatre at the Hermes restaurant in Pärnu between 1972 and 1984 and the Varius Theatre in Tallinn.

Tedre has been a member of the Estonian Theater Association since 1971. Since 1993, she has been a member of the Actors' Union since 1993, and an honorary member since 2014.

=== Film and television ===
Since the 1970s, Tedre has frequently appeared in television films and series. In 1976, she made her television debut in a small part in the Virve Aruoja-directed Tallinnfilm television comedy film Minu naine sai vanaemaks, based on the 1975 Erni Krusten-penned novel Vastsündinu. In 1982, she appeared as Dudkina in the Ingo Normet-directed television comedy film Puhkepäev. In 1991, she appeared as the character Eeva Almar in the Ingo Normet-directed television film Otto Almari nägemus, based on the 1907 story Uurimisel, by A. H. Tammsaare.

Since the 2000s. Tedre has made a number of appearances as a guest actress on several Estonian television series, most notably: the long-running Eesti Televisioon (ETV) drama series Õnne 13 in 2001, the ETV crime series Ohtlik lend in 2006, the Kanal 2 crimes eries Siberi võmm in 2017, the TV3 crime series Lõks in 2018, and between 2015 and 2018, several roles on the TV3 comedy-crime series Kättemaksukontor.

Tedre's first major role in a motion picture was that of Mother in the 1992 Mati Põldre-directed historical drama Need vanad armastuskirjad, which chronicles the life of Estonian musician and composer Raimond Valgre. In 2012, she appeared as the mother of actress Evelin Võigemast's character in the Ain Mäeots-directed drama Deemonid.

== Personal life ==
In 1971, Lii Mander married actor and businessman Peeter Tedre. The couple lived in Tallinn, with a summer home in Pärnu until his death on 18 March 2020.

== Acknowledgements ==
Tedre has won an Estonian Theatre Association award on five occasions and has been chosen as the audience favorite of Endla Theatre several times during her career with the theatre. In 2006, she was awarded the annual prize of the Estonian Actors' Union and the same year also awarded the Johann Voldemar Jannsen Award by the city of Pärnu for her long-term contribution to Pärnu's cultural life. In August 2019, Minister of Culture Tõnis Lukas presented Tedre with a letter of thanks and a gift of €1,000 in appreciation of Tedre's contribution to national culture.
