= Asagiri Station =

Asagiri Station may refer to:

- Asagiri Station (Hyōgo) on the Sanyo Main Line
- Asagiri Station (Kumamoto) on the Kumagawa Railroad Yunomae Line
