= Oscar Strasnoy =

French-Argentine composer, conductor and pianist

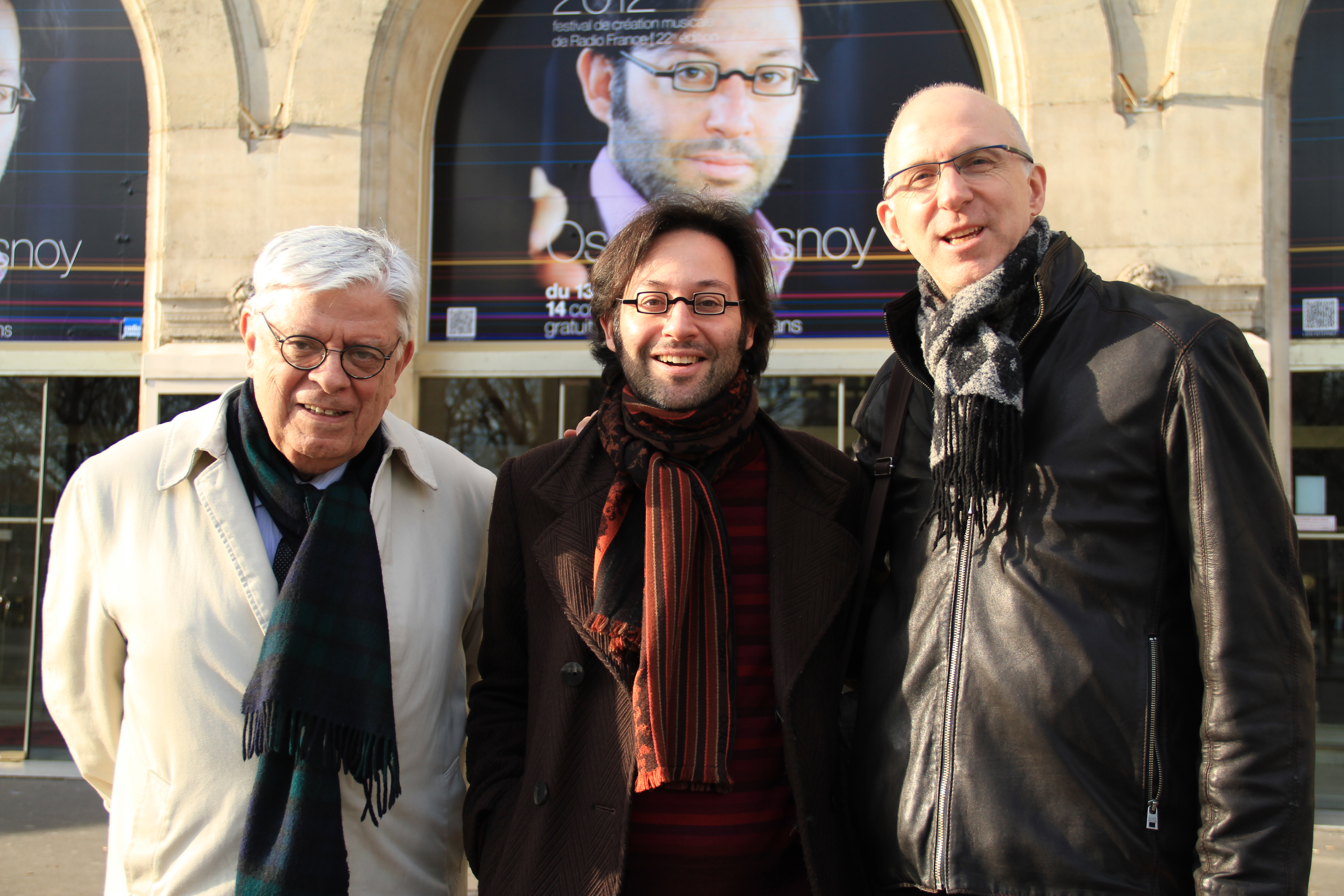
Hermenegildo Sábat, Oscar Strasnoy, Matthew Jocelyn (2012)

Oscar Strasnoy (born November 12, 1970) is a French-Argentine composer, conductor and pianist. Although primarily known for his stage works, the first of which Midea (2) premiered in Spoleto in 2000, his principal compositions also include two secular cantatas and several song cycles.

== Career ==
Oscar Strasnoy was born in Buenos Aires and studied piano, conducting and composition there at the Conservatorio Nacional Superior de Música (with Aldo Antognazzi and Guillermo Scarabino), at the Conservatoire de Paris (with Guy Reibel, Michaël Levinas and Gérard Grisey), where he won in 1996 a Premier Prix à l’Unanimité (first prize) and the Hochschule für Musik, Frankfurt (with Hans Zender). He was the music director of the Orchestre du Crous de Paris (1996–1998). He was one of the founding recipients of the Grüneisen Foundation (Mozarteum Argentino) conducting scholarship, and of the French Government Scholarship. In 1999 he was invited by Peter Eötvös to Herrenhaus-Edenkoben in Germany.

Luciano Berio awarded him the 2000 Orpheus Prize for his chamber opera Midea (2) produced at the Teatro Caio Melisso in Spoleto in 2000 and at the Rome Opera in 2001. He was also artist in residence at the Akademie Schloss Solitude in Stuttgart, in 2003 at the Villa Kujoyama in Kyoto (Institut français), and in 2006 at the Civitella Ranieri Foundation in Umbria, Italy. In 2007 he received a John Simon Guggenheim Memorial Foundation Fellowship for Music Composition. Radio France, in association with the parisian Théâtre du Châtelet, featured Strasnoy as the main composer of the Festival Présences 2012, a retrospective of most of his works in 14 concerts in January 2012.

== Compositions ==
Oscar Strasnoy has composed twelve stage works, including operas performed at Spoleto, Rome, Paris (Opéra Comique, Théâtre du Châtelet), Hamburg, Bordeaux, Aix-en-Provence Festival, Teatro Colón of Buenos Aires), Berlin State Opera; a live-accompanied silent film score for Anthony Asquith's Underground which premiered at the Louvre in 2004 and was subsequently played at the Cine Doré in Madrid, the Mozarteum Argentino, Kyoto, and Tokyo) and a secular cantata, Hochzeitsvorbereitungen (mit B und K). He also composed several pieces of chamber, vocal and orchestral music, including his song cycle Six Songs for the Unquiet Traveller which premiered in 2004 performed by the Nash Ensemble and Ann Murray in a concert to inaugurate the newly refurbished Wigmore Hall in London.

In January 2012 a retrospective of his work in 14 concerts has been presented at the Théâtre du Châtelet in Paris as part of the Festival Présences of Radio France. Strasnoy's works are primarily published by Universal Edition (Vienna) Chant du Monde (Paris) and Billaudot (Paris). His opera Midea is published by Ricordi (Milan).

=== Operas and music theatre ===
- 1996-1999: "Midea (2)" chamber opera. Libretto (in Italian) by Irina Possamai. Premièred at the Teatro Caio Melisso, Spoleto, Italy, 8 September 2000 directed by Hennig Brockhaus, conducted by Andrea Molino.
- 2002: "Opérette". Libretto (in French) by Witold Gombrowicz. Premièred at the Grand Théâtre of Reims, France, 10 January 2003 directed by Christian Gangneron.
- 2003: "Geschichte", operetta a cappella. Libretto (in German) by Galin Stoev and Oscar Strasnoy based on Witold Gombrowicz's play, premièred at Theaterhaus Stuttgart, 31 March 2004, directed by Galin Stoev. Second production in 2011 directed by Titus Selge. Third production at the Berlin Staatsoper, Sept.-Oct. 2015, directed by Isabel Ostermann.
- 2005: "Fabula", pocket-opera. Libretto (in Spanish and Yiddish) by Alejandro Tantanian. Premièred at Teatro San Martín, Buenos Aires, 29 November 2005, directed by Renate Ackermann.
- 2000-2006: "L'instant", children opera in one act. Libretto (in French) by Alejandro Tantanian. Premièred at Maison des Arts de Créteil, Paris, 2008 (concert version), conducted by Oscar Strasnoy.
- 2008-2009: "Le Bal" opera in one act based on Irène Némirovsky's novelette The Ball, libretto (in French) by Matthew Jocelyn, premièred in Hamburg Opera-House, 7 March 2010, directed by Matthew Jocelyn, conducted by Simone Young. Second production: Théâtre du Châtelet, Paris, January 2012, directed (semi-staged) by Matthew Jocelyn, conducted by Anu Tali. Third production: Prinzregententheater of Munich, November 2012, directed by Karsten Wiegand, conducted by Ulf Schirmer.
- 2009-2010: "Un Retour", chamber opera in one act, Libretto (in Spanish, French and Latin) by Alberto Manguel based on his novel El Regreso, premièred at Festival d'Aix en Provence, France, 5 July 2010)
- 2010: "Cachafaz" opera in two acts. Libretto (in Spanish) by Copi based on dis play, premièred at Théâtre de Cornouaille, Quimper, France, Nov. 2010), directed by Benjamin Lazar, conducted by Geoffroy Jourdain. Second production: Teatro San Martín of Buenos Aires, Nov. 2012, directed by Pablo Maritano and conducted by Pierre Roullier.
- 2011-2012: "Случай" (Slutchai, Incidents), chamber opera in two acts. Libretto (in Russian) by Christine Dormoy based on Daniil Kharms writings. Premiered at Bordeaux Opera House, 26 November 2012, directed by Christine Dormoy, conducted by Oscar Strasnoy. Second Production, new version ("Fälle" in German) at Zürich Opera House, premiere on 8 May 2015, directed by Jan Eßinger, conducted by Carrie-Ann Matheson.
- 2012-2014: "Requiem", opéra in two acts. Libretto (in English and Latin) by Matthew Jocelyn based on the novel Requiem for a nun by William Faulkner, premièred at Teatro Colón of Buenos Aires, 10 June 2014, directed by Matthew Jocelyn, conducted by Christian Baldini.
- 2015-2016: "Comeback", chamber opera. Libretto (in German) by Christoph Hein, based on "Tilla" and "Jannings" by Christoph Hein. Première: Staatsoper Berlin, 30 September 2016.
- 2017: "Luther", opera/oatorio. Libretto (in German) by Christoph Hein. Première: Halle, Germany, 2017
- 2022-2023: "Robinson". Libretto (in German) by Sigrid Behrens. Première: Staatsoper Berlin, Halle, 25 February 2023. (Universal Edition)
- 2023-2025: "Dementia". Libretto (in Spanish and French) by Ariana Harwicz. Première: Teatro Colón of Buenos Aires, May 2026. (Universal Edition)

=== Concert works (selection) ===
- 1992: Piano 1: Incognito (Ed. Billaudot, Paris)
- 1995: Piano 2: Britannicus
- 1995: Naipes, for Pierrot-Lunaire-type quintet (Ed. Le Chant du Monde/Wise Music)
- 1997: Piano 3: à Corinthe (Ed. Billaudot, Paris)
- 1999: Piano 4: 5 pièces (Ed. Billaudot, Paris)
- 1999: Two tangos (Ed. Lemoine, Paris)
- 2000: Bloc-notes d'Ephemera (1) for ensemble
- 2000: Bloc-notes d'Ephemera (2) for two pianos (Ed. Le Chant du Monde/Wise Music)
- 2002: Piano 5: Exercices de Latinité (Ed. Billaudot, Paris)
- 2000-(rev. 2005): Hochzeitsvorbereitungen (mit B und K) (cantata) (Ed. Le Chant du Monde/Wise Music)
- 2004: Underground, music for the 1928 silent film by Anthony Asquith.
- 2004: Six Songs for the Unquiet Traveller (on texts by Alberto Manguel) (Ed. Le Chant du Monde/Wise Music)
- 2005: Scherzo (Sum nº 3) for orchestra (Ed. Le Chant du Monde/Wise Music)
- 2006: The End (Sum nº 4) for orchestra (Ed. Le Chant du Monde/Wise Music)
- 2008: Quodlibet, song cycle, premièred in Stuttgart, 2008.
- 2010: "Heine", song cycle on poems by Heinrich Heine (Ed. Billaudot, Paris)
- 2009-2011: Incipit (Sum nº 1), for orchestra (Ed. Billaudot, Paris)
- 2009-2011: Y (Sum nº 2, for orchestra) (Ed. Billaudot, Paris)
- 2012: Odyssée, cantata (libretto: Alberto Manguel), for 12 vocal soloists, 5 choirs and three instrumental groups (Ed. Billaudot, Paris)
- 2013: Vague-Requiem, for Cello Octet (Ed. Billaudot, Paris)
- 2014: Müller, song-cycle on poems by Wilhelm Müller, Heiner Müller and Herta Müller for Tenor and piano.
- 2015: Double Ostinato, for solo accordion.
- 2016: Ghost Stories, for string quartet and 33 rpm record (Ed. Billaudot, Paris)
- 2016: Automaton, for violin and chamber orchestra (Ed. Billaudot, Paris)
- 2017: Kuleshov, for piano and chamber orchestra (Ed. Billaudot, Paris)
- 2017: Ittingen-Concerto, for chamber orchestra (Ed. Billaudot, Paris)
- 2017: 2. Juni (from "Tage-Buch"), for violin, horn and 33 rpm record.
- 2017: 4. Juni, (from "Tage-Buch") for solo violin and 33 rpm record.
- 2017: 5. Juni, (from "Tage-Buch") for violin and tenor.
- 2017: Flashbacks, for 10 instruments. Première: 8 DEC 2017 by the Ensemble Modern Frankfurt, in Munich. Ed. Billaudot.
- 2018: d'Amore, for viola d'amore and ensemble. Première: 20 OCT 2018 by Garth Knox and the Ensemble Modern, in Donaueschingen. Ed. Billaudot.
- 2019: Trí Amhrán Ghaelacha (Three Irish Songs) for tenor and piano.
- 2019: Chanzuns Popularas Rumanchas (Rhaetian Folk Songs) for female singer and ensemble. Première: 29 MAY 2019, La-Chaux-de-Fonds, Switzerland Universal Edition
- 2019: Zaunkönig und -gäste, for orchestra. Première: 1 JUL 2019 by the Musikalische Akademie des Nationaltheater-Orchesters Mannheim conducted by Alexander Soddy. Ed. Billaudot
- 2019: Verschiedene Canones - Neue Auflösungen (nach J.S. Bachs Canones, BWV 1087) for baroque orchestra and percussion. Première: 19 OCT 2019 in Berlin, Akademie für Alte Musik Berlin (Universal Edition)
- 2019: Für Felice for vocal ensemble (12 voices) and instrument ad libitum. Commissioned by the Ensemble Musicatreize (Universal Edition)
- 2020: Three Kamasutra Etudes, for vocal ensemble (12 voices). (Universal Edition)
- 2020: Partita I for solo violin (for Isabelle Faust)
- 2020: 24 Preludes for piano (for Alexandre Tharaud)
- 2022: Partita II for harp.
- 2022: Tombeau de Monjeau for piano. (Universal Edition)
- 2025: Sinfonia Concertante for piano, violoncello and orchestra. (Universal Edition)
- 2026: Bazaar for ensemble and analog electronics. (Universal Edition)
- 2026: Payada for cello and guitar.

=== Transcriptions and Arrangements ===
- 2010: La Forza del Destino, Overture by Giuseppe Verdi, for ensemble.
- 2011: Trois caprices de Paganini, for violin and orchestra.
- 2011: "Dido and Aeneas" chamber opera based on Henry Purcell's opera), for seven singers, two pianos, two brass instruments and two percussion players. Premièred in Paris, Théâtre du Châtelet, January 2012 (concert version) conducted by Roland Hayrabedian.
- 2017 Two Schubert Menuets (from "Fünf Menuette mit sechs Trios"), Nº 3 and Nº 5 for octet (like Schubert's Octet).
- 2019: Romanze Op. 118, Nº 5 (by Johannes Brahms), arrangement for violin and orchestra. Première: 25 APR 2019 at the Elbphiharmonie Hamburg, Isabelle Faust, NDR Elbphilharmonie-Orchester, cond. Antonello Manacorda.
- 2020: Saint François d'Assise, opera by Olivier Messiaen (re-orchestration for reduced (à 2) orchestra). Première: 15 OCT 2020 at Theater Basel, Switzerland.

== Discography ==
2025: Cadenza, to the Ligeti Violin Concerto. Isabelle Faust, Les Siècles, François-Xavier Roth CD Harmonia Mundi.

2022: Tombeau de Monjeau, for piano. Mara Dobresco CD La Scala.

2022: Chanzuns Popularas Rumanchas, for female voice and ensemble. Sarah Maria Sun and Ensemble SONGS CD SONGS OO1.

2020: Kuleshov, Piano Concerto. Alexandre Tharaud, Les Violons du Roy conducted by Mathieu Lussier CD Erato/Warner Classics.

2018: Two Schubert Menuets (from "Fünf Menuette mit sechs Trios"), nº 3 and nº 5, arrangement for octet, Isabelle Faust & Friends. CD Harmonia Mundi.

2017: Berceuse (from "Five Little Pieces for Piano", ed. Billaudot), Mara Dobresco, piano. CD Paraty 107159.

2016: Hanokh, by Erwan Keravec, bagpipe, Donatienne Michel-Dansac, soprano and Vincent Bouchot, baritone, CD Vox.

2014: An Island Far, Ensemble 2e2m, dir. Pierre Roullier, CD Le Chant du Monde.

2013: Orchestral works, Orchestre Philharmonique de Radio France conducted by Dima Slobodeniouk and Susanna Mälkki CD Aeon

2013: Geschichte (fragment), CD du Festival d'Automne de Varsovie. Neue Vocalsolisten Stuttgart.

2010: Un retour, Ensemble Musicatreize, dir. Roland Hayrabedian

2007: Hochzeitsvorbereitungen (mit B und K) CD Chant du Monde, Ensemble 2e2m, dir. Pierre Roullier

2000: Two tangos ("Derrumbe" and "Mano Brava") Paris-Buenos Aires, CD Bis records

1998: Bloc-notes de Midea (5), CD Hochschule für Musik Köln/Conservatoire de Paris, cond. Peter Eötvös

== Bibliography ==
2009 La stratification de la mémoire Colection 2e2m

2010 Un retour Livre-CD Actes-Sud

2017 Automaton, Monroe-Books, Berlin

== Awards ==
- 2025: Award of the National Academy of Fine Arts, Argentina.
- 2019: Konex Award.
- 2013: Prix de composition "Francis et Mica Salabert" SACEM, France.
- 2011: Prix Nouveau Talent Musique SACD, France.
- 2010: Grand Prix de la Musique Symphonique, SACEM.
- 2007: Guggenheim Fellowship
- 2007: Prix de l'Académie du Disque Lyrique.
- 2003: Prix "Georges Enesco", SACEM.
- 1999: Premio "Orpheus", Spoleto, Italy, for "Midea".

== Sources ==
- Associated Press (9 March 2000). "Young Argentinean composer wins Italian opera prize" (subscription required)
- de la Fuente, Sandra (28 July 2010). "Oscar Strasnoy: «La música pura ya no es suficiente»" (interview with Oscar Strasnoy). Clarín (in Spanish)
- France Today (5 July 2010). "Live from Aix: World premiere of Un Retour"
- France Musique (16 February 2011) Concert du soir (in French)
- La Nación (9 August 2008). "Muchos compositores son ignorantes" (interview with Oscar Strasnoy) (in Spanish)
- Mudge, Stephen J. (March 2011). "Cachafaz, Paris, Opéra Comique, 12/13/10". Opera News, Vol. 75, No. 9
- Service, Tom (12 October 2004). "Review: Nash/Kildea, Wigmore Hall, London". The Guardian
- John Simon Guggenheim Memorial Foundation (2008) Reports of the president and of the treasurer
