= Redstone 4 =

Redstone 4 may refer to:

- Mercury-Redstone 4, a 1961 spaceflight
- Redstone 4, codename for Windows 10 April 2018 Update, released on 30 April 2018.
