= Christian Baldini =

American-Italian conductor

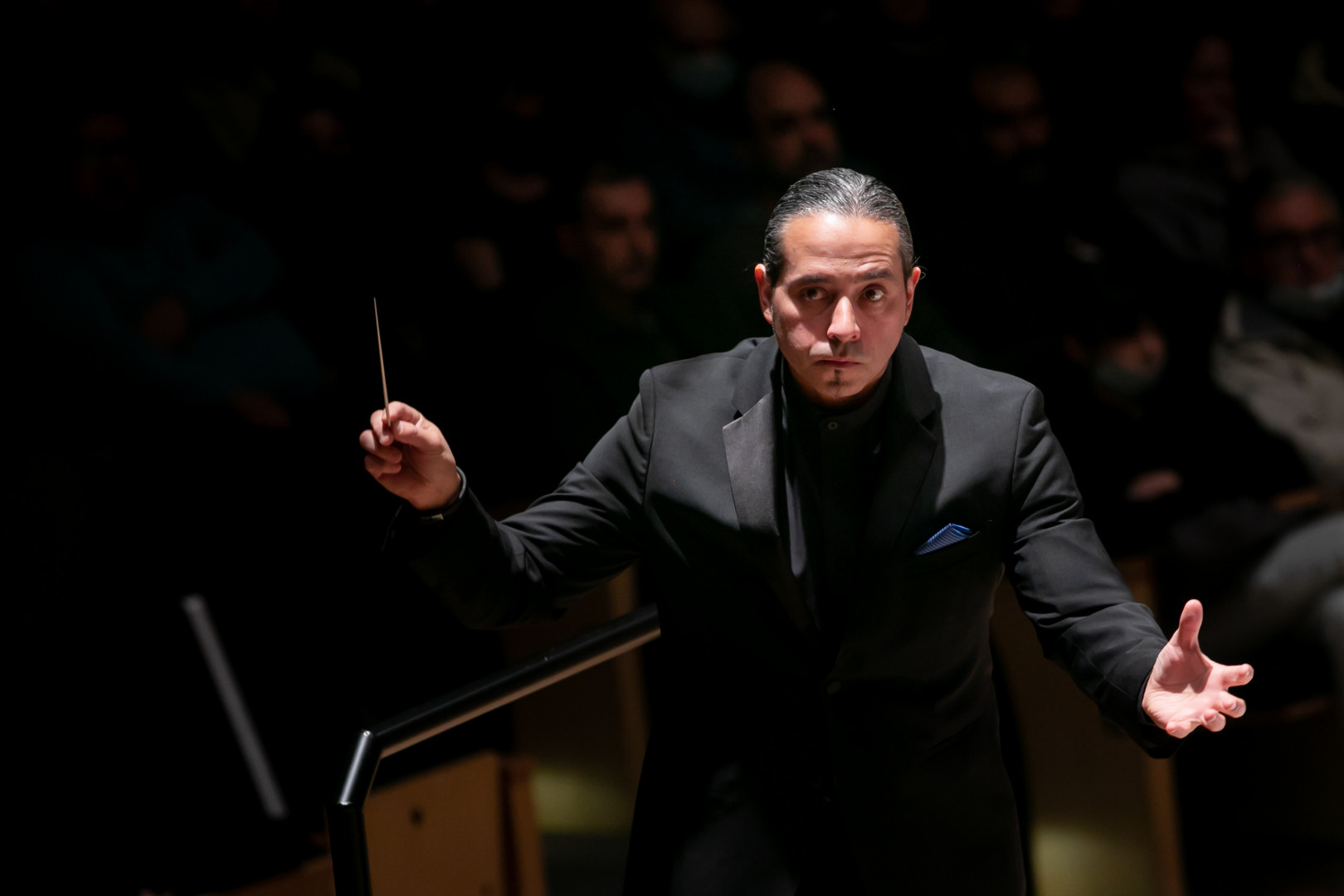
Christian Baldini

Christian Baldini is an American, Italian and Argentine opera and orchestra conductor and composer.

== Biography ==
He was born in Mar del Plata (Argentina) on August 25, 1978. His CD "Mozart Arias and Overtures" conducting the Scottish Chamber Orchestra with soprano Elizabeth Watts was chosen as "Recording of the Month" by the BBC Music Magazine and MusicWeb International, CD of the Week by Classic FM, and received critical acclaim with 4- and 5-star reviews on Gramophone, Sinfini, The Guardian and Opera News.

Baldini served as an assistant conductor with the BBC Symphony Orchestra in London, and as a cover conductor for Michael Tilson Thomas and the San Francisco Symphony. In 2015, invited by Michael Tilson Thomas, Baldini conducted the first ever performance of a work by John Luther Adams with the San Francisco Symphony. Baldini has conducted opera for the Aldeburgh Festival (founded by Benjamin Britten), the Teatro Colón of Buenos Aires (Dallapiccola's Il prigioniero and Volo di notte, and the world première of Oscar Strasnoy's opera Requiem). He has been the conductor of the Mondavi Center's yearly Rising Stars of Opera program since 2009, featuring wonderful operatic young talent from the San Francisco Opera Ader Fellows Program, including many winners of international competitions such as Brian Jagde, Pene Pati, David Lomelí, Nadine Sierra, Sean Pannikar, and Leah Crocetto.
