= Ensemble 2e2m =

The Ensemble 2e2m is a French musical ensemble specializing in the interpretation of works of the twentieth and twenty-first centuries.

== History ==
The Ensemble 2e2m was founded by Paul Méfano in 1972. 2e2m means études et expressions des modes musicaux (Studies and expressions of musical modes). It is one of the oldest ensembles devoted to contemporary classical music.

== Repertoire ==
The repertoire of the Ensemble 2e2m is essentially oriented towards contemporary music and the creation of new works. Over 600 scores have been created by the ensemble since its founding.

== Music directors ==
- 1971–2003: Paul Méfano
- 1982–1985: Costin Miereanu (artistic co-director)
- 2003–2018: Pierre Roullier
- 2019–2021: Fernando Fiszbein
- Since 2022: Léo Margue
