= Akashi pedestrian bridge accident =

2001 human crush in Akashi, Hyōgo, Japan

Coordinates: 34°38′38″N 135°01′03″E

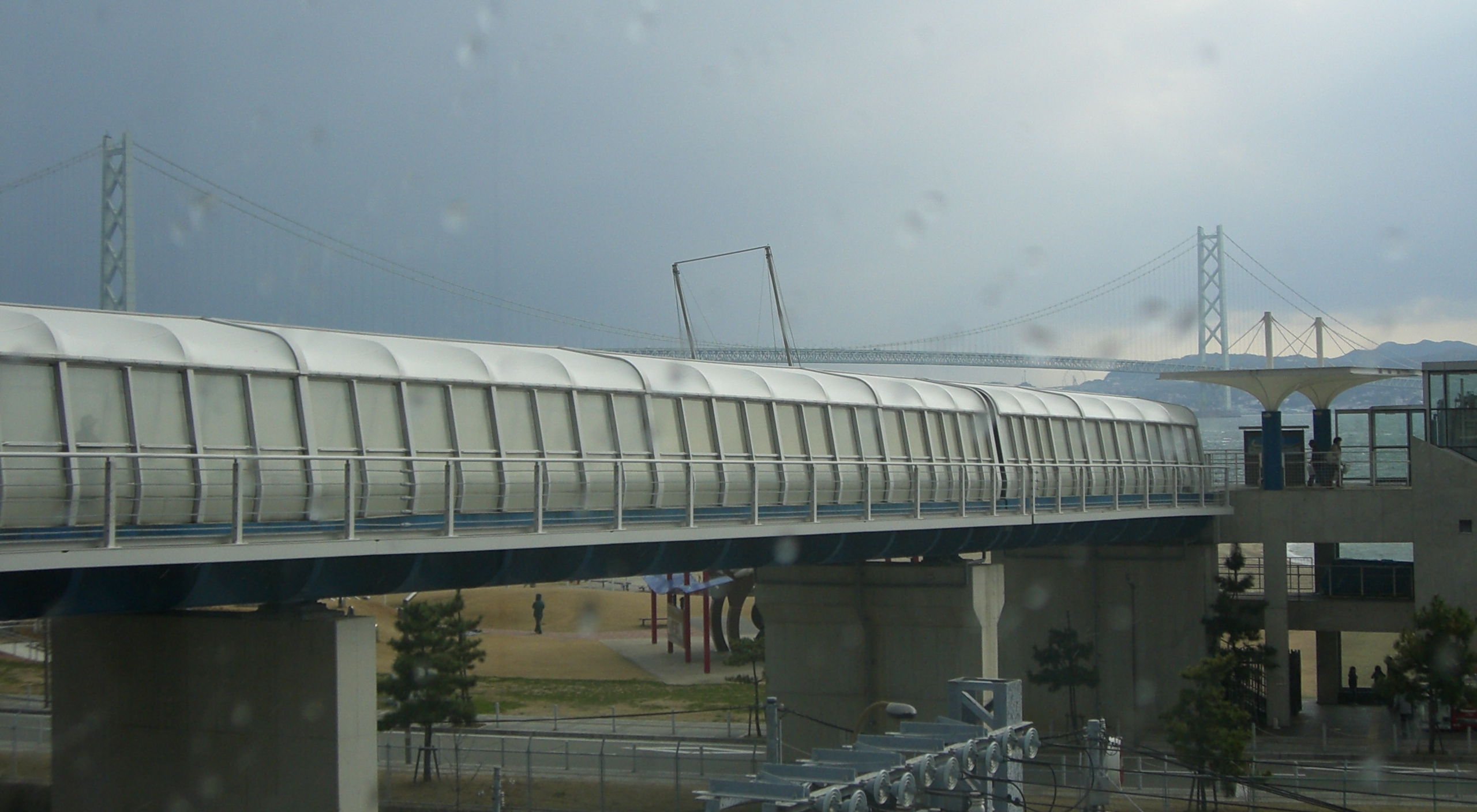
The pedestrian bridge leading to Asagiri Station in which the crush occurred

The Akashi pedestrian bridge accident (明石歩道橋事故, Akashi hodōkyō jiko) was a human crush that occurred on 21 July 2001 in Akashi, Hyōgo, Japan. In the incident, a large crowd of people packed into a partially enclosed pedestrian overpass leading to Asagiri Station after a fireworks show. The resulting crush killed 11 people, including two adults and nine children, and injured 183 others. Five civic and security officials were later convicted of professional negligence for not preventing the disaster.
