= Mercury-Redstone 4 =

1961 American crewed sub-orbital spaceflight

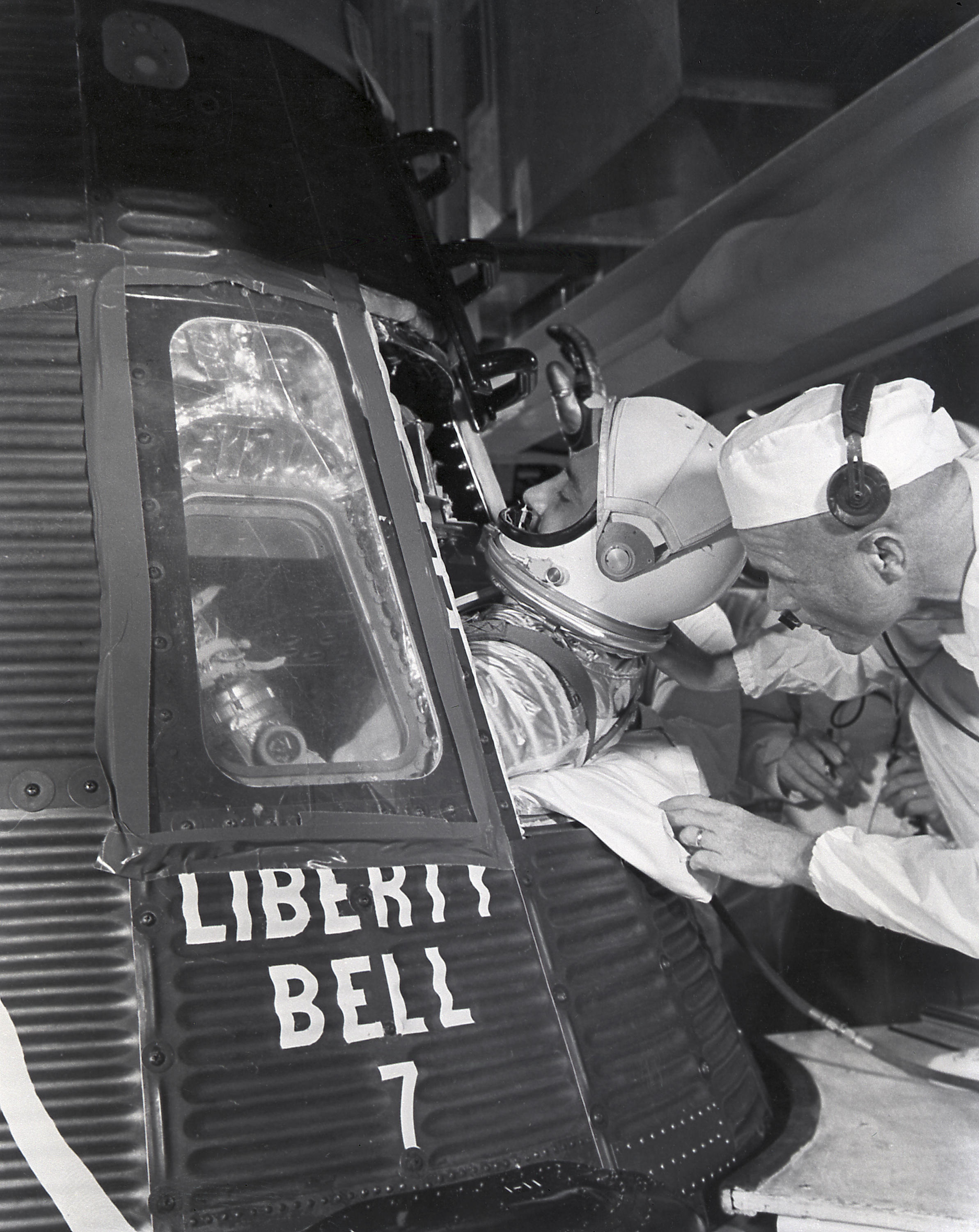
- Astronaut Gus Grissom climbs into Liberty Bell 7
- Mission type: Test flight
- Operator: NASA
- Mission duration: 15 minutes, 37 seconds
- Range: 262.50 nautical miles (486.15 km)
- Apogee: 102.76 nautical miles (190.31 km)

Spacecraft properties
- Spacecraft: Mercury No.11
- Manufacturer: McDonnell Aircraft
- Launch mass: 2,835 pounds (1,286 kg)

Crew
- Crew size: 1
- Members: Virgil I. Grissom
- Callsign: Liberty Bell 7

Start of mission
- Launch date: July 21, 1961, 12:20:36 UTC
- Rocket: Redstone MRLV MR-8
- Launch site: Cape Canaveral LC-5

End of mission
- Recovered by: USS Randolph
- Landing date: July 21, 1961, 12:36:13 UTC
- Landing site: North Atlantic Ocean; 27°32′9″N 75°45′57″W
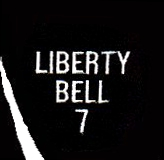
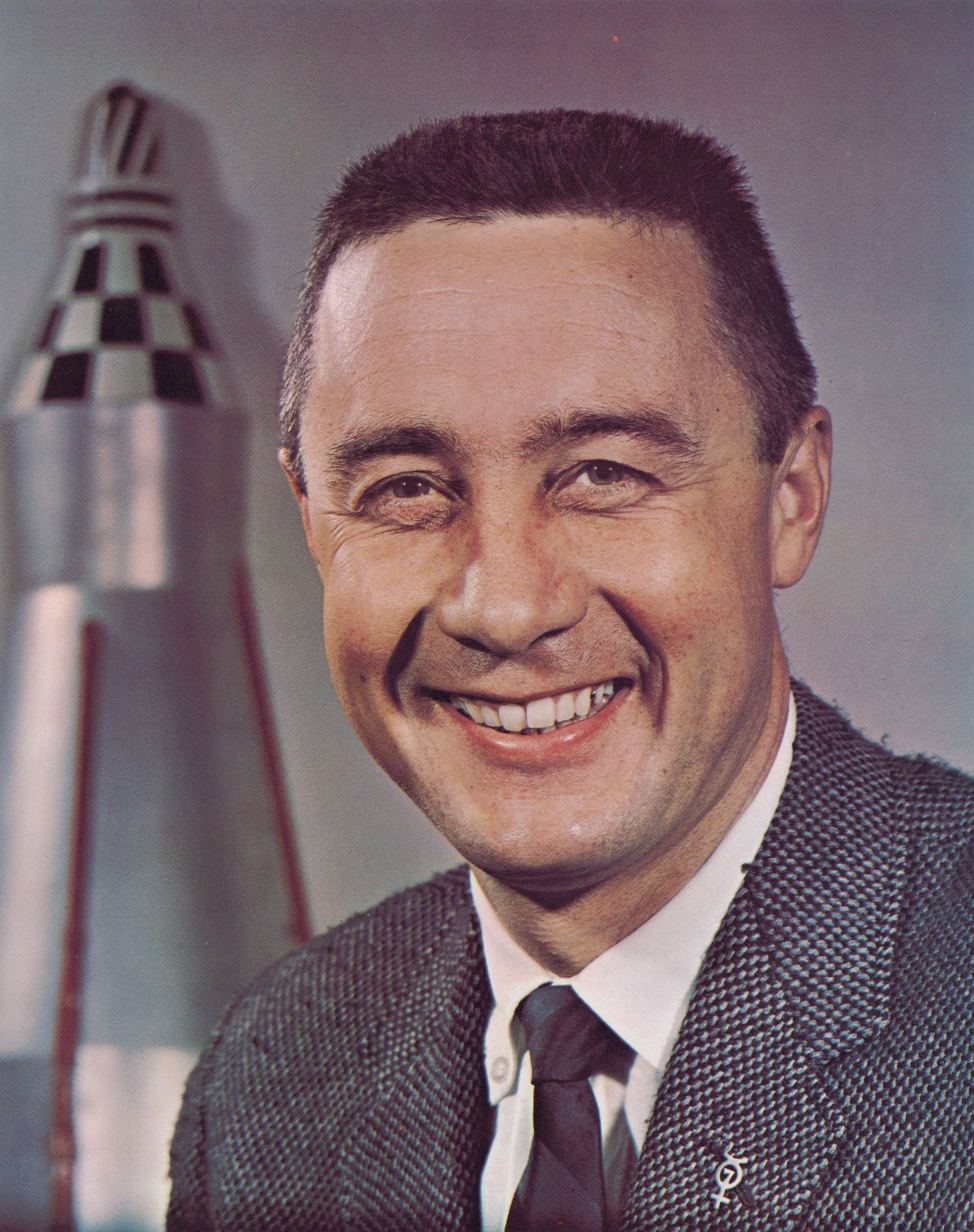
- Spacecraft name as painted on capsule side, with a "crack" Virgil Ivan "Gus" Grissom Project Mercury; Crewed missions

Mercury-Redstone 4 was the second United States human spaceflight, on July 21, 1961. The suborbital Project Mercury flight was launched with a Mercury-Redstone Launch Vehicle, MRLV-8. The spacecraft, Mercury capsule #11, was nicknamed Liberty Bell 7. It was piloted by astronaut Virgil "Gus" Grissom.

The spaceflight lasted 15 minutes 30 seconds, reached an altitude of more than 102.8 nautical miles (190.4 km), and flew 262.5 nautical miles (486.2 km) downrange, landing in the Atlantic Ocean. The flight went as expected until just after splashdown, when the hatch cover, designed to release explosively in the event of an emergency, accidentally blew. Grissom was at risk of drowning, but was recovered safely via a U.S. Navy helicopter. The spacecraft sank into the Atlantic and was not recovered until 1999.

== Mission parameters ==
- Mass: 1 286 kg
- Maximum altitude: 190.39 km
- Range: 486.15 km
- Launch vehicle: Redstone rocket

== Spacecraft ==
The MR-4 spacecraft, Mercury capsule #11, was designated to fly the second crewed suborbital flight in October 1960. It came off McDonnell's St. Louis production line in May 1960. Capsule #11 was the first Mercury operational spacecraft with a centerline window instead of two portholes. It was closer to the final orbital version than was Alan Shepard's Freedom 7. Dubbed Liberty Bell 7 by its pilot, it featured a white, diagonal, irregular paint stripe starting at the base of the capsule and extending about two-thirds toward the nose, emulating the crack in the famed Liberty Bell in Philadelphia, Pennsylvania.

=== Explosive hatch ===
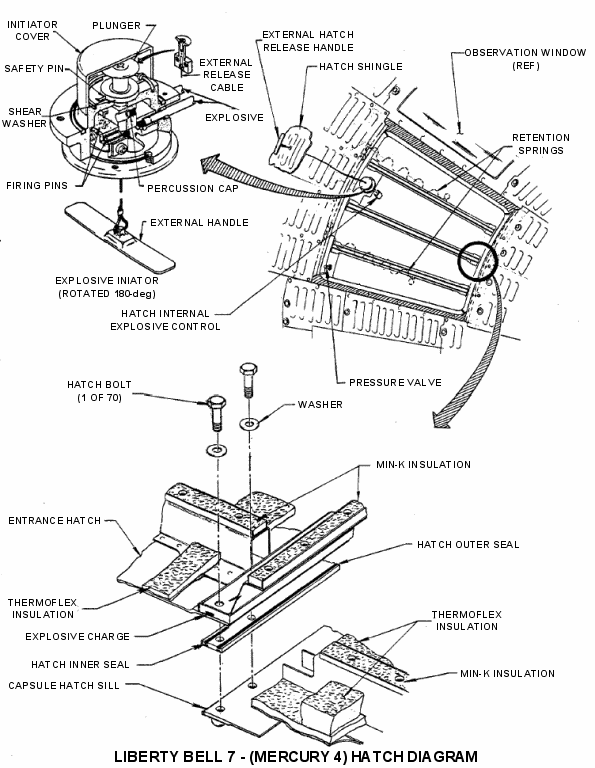
MR-4 Explosive Hatch Diagram (NASA)

Liberty Bell 7 also had a new explosive hatch release. This would allow an astronaut to exit the spacecraft quickly in the event of an emergency. Emergency personnel could also trigger the explosive hatch from outside the spacecraft by pulling on an external lanyard. Both the pop-off hatch and the lanyard are standard features of ejection seats used in military aircraft, but in the Mercury design, the pilot still had to exit the craft himself, or be removed by emergency personnel. The original exit procedure was to climb out through the antenna compartment, after removing a small pressure bulkhead. This was a difficult and slow procedure. Removal of an injured or unconscious astronaut through the top hatch would be nearly impossible. The original side hatch was bolted shut with 70 bolts and covered with several spacecraft shingles, making it a slow process to open the original hatch.

McDonnell Aircraft engineers devised two different quick-release hatches for the Mercury spacecraft. The first had a latch, and was used on the chimpanzee Ham's MR-2 and Shepard's MR-3 missions. The second design was an explosive release hatch. The quick release latching hatch weighed 69 lb (31 kg), too much of a weight addition to use on the orbital version of the spacecraft. The explosive hatch design used the 70 bolts of the original design, but each quarter-inch (6.35 mm) titanium bolt had a 0.06 in (1.5 mm) hole bored into it to provide a weak point. A mild detonating fuse (MDF) was installed in a channel between the inner and outer seal around the periphery of the hatch. When the MDF was ignited, the resulting gas pressure between the inner and outer seal would cause the bolts to fail in tension.

There were two ways to fire the explosive hatch during recovery. On the inside of the hatch was a knobbed plunger. The pilot could remove a pin and press the plunger with a force of 5 or 6 lb_{f} (25 N). This would detonate the explosive charge, which would shear off the 70 bolts and propel the hatch 25 ft (7.6 m) away in one second. If the pin was left in place, a force of 40 lb_{f} (180 N) was required to detonate the bolts. An outside rescuer could blow open the hatch by removing a small panel near the hatch and pulling a lanyard. The explosive hatch weighed 23 lb (10 kg).

=== Window ===
The new trapezoidal window on Liberty Bell 7 replaced the two 10 in (250 mm) side portholes that were on Freedom 7. The Corning Glass Works of Corning, New York designed and developed the multilayered panes that comprised the new window. The outer pane was 0.35 in (8.9 mm) thick Vycor glass. It could withstand temperatures of 1,500 to 1,800 °F (820 to 980 °C). The inner pane was made of three inner glass panels bonded to form a single inner pane. One panel was a 0.17 in (4.3 mm) thick sheet of Vycor, while the others were tempered glass. This new window assembly was as strong as any part of the spacecraft pressure vessel.

=== Controls ===
The manual controls of Liberty Bell 7 incorporated a new rate stabilization control system. This allowed fine control of spacecraft attitude movements by small turns of the hand controller. Previously a lot of jockeying of the device was needed to maintain the desired attitude. This rate damping, or rate augmentation system, gave finer and easier handling qualities and a redundant means of firing the pitch, yaw, and roll thrusters.

Before the Mercury-Redstone 4 mission, Lewis Research Center and Space Task Group engineers had determined that firing the posigrade rockets into the booster-spacecraft adapter, rather than in the open, developed 78 percent greater thrust. This achieved a greater spacecraft-booster separation through a kind of "pop-gun" effect. By using this technique, the spacecraft separated at velocity of about 28.1 ft/s (8.6 m/s) rather than 15 ft/s (4.6 m/s) using the old procedure. The Mercury-Redstone 4/Liberty Bell 7 mission would take advantage of this new procedure.

Additional hardware changes to Liberty Bell 7 were a redesigned fairing for the spacecraft-Redstone adapter clamp-ring and additional foam padding added to the head area of the contour couch. The fairing changes and additional foam were used to reduce vibrations the pilot experienced during the boost phase of flight. The spacecraft instrument panel was rearranged to provide a better eye scan pattern.

== Naming ==
Captain Grissom dubbed his capsule "Liberty Bell 7", the seven in honor of the seven original astronauts selected for Mercury, a tradition inadvertently started by prior Mercury pilot, Alan Shepard, who incorporated the seven in "Freedom 7" as his spacecraft was factory model no. 7. The other astronauts liked the symbolism, and so each appended 7 to their spacecraft names as well. Grissom chose "Liberty Bell" due to the capsule's resemblance to a bell, and because it evoked the iconic Liberty Bell. Grissom went as far as having the Liberty Bell on the spacecraft complete with the crack that characterizes the real bell. This detail motivated a degree of teasing of Grissom after the spacecraft sank in the ocean at the end of its mission.

== Mission description ==
In January 1961, NASA's Director of the Space Task Group, Robert Gilruth, told Gus Grissom that he would be the primary pilot for Mercury-Redstone 4. John Glenn was the backup pilot for the mission.

Redstone launch vehicle MRLV-8 arrived at Cape Canaveral on June 8, 1961. A mission review on July 15, 1961, pronounced Redstone MRLV-8 and Mercury spacecraft #11 ready to go for the Mercury-Redstone 4 mission.

The Mercury 4 mission was planned as a repeat of MR-3. It was to reach an apogee of 116 mi (187 km). The planned range was 299 mi (481 km). Grissom would experience a maximum acceleration of 6.33 g (62 m/s^{2}) and deceleration of 10.96 g (107 m/s^{2}).

The launch of Liberty Bell 7 was first planned for July 16. The cloud cover was too thick and the launch was postponed until July 18. On July 18, it was again postponed due to weather. Both times, the pilot had not yet boarded the spacecraft. On July 19, 1961, Grissom was on board when the flight was delayed again due to weather. At that point, it had just 10 minutes 30 seconds to go before launch.

On the morning of July 21, 1961, Gus Grissom entered the Liberty Bell 7 at 8:58 UTC and the 70 hatch bolts were put in place. At 45 minutes prior to the scheduled launch, a pad technician discovered that one of the hatch bolts was misaligned. During a 30-minute hold that was called, McDonnell and NASA Space Task Group engineers decided that the 69 remaining bolts should be sufficient to hold the hatch in place and blow it at the appropriate time. The misaligned bolt was not replaced.

Liberty Bell 7 was launched at 12:20:36 UTC, July 21, 1961.

=== Launch ===
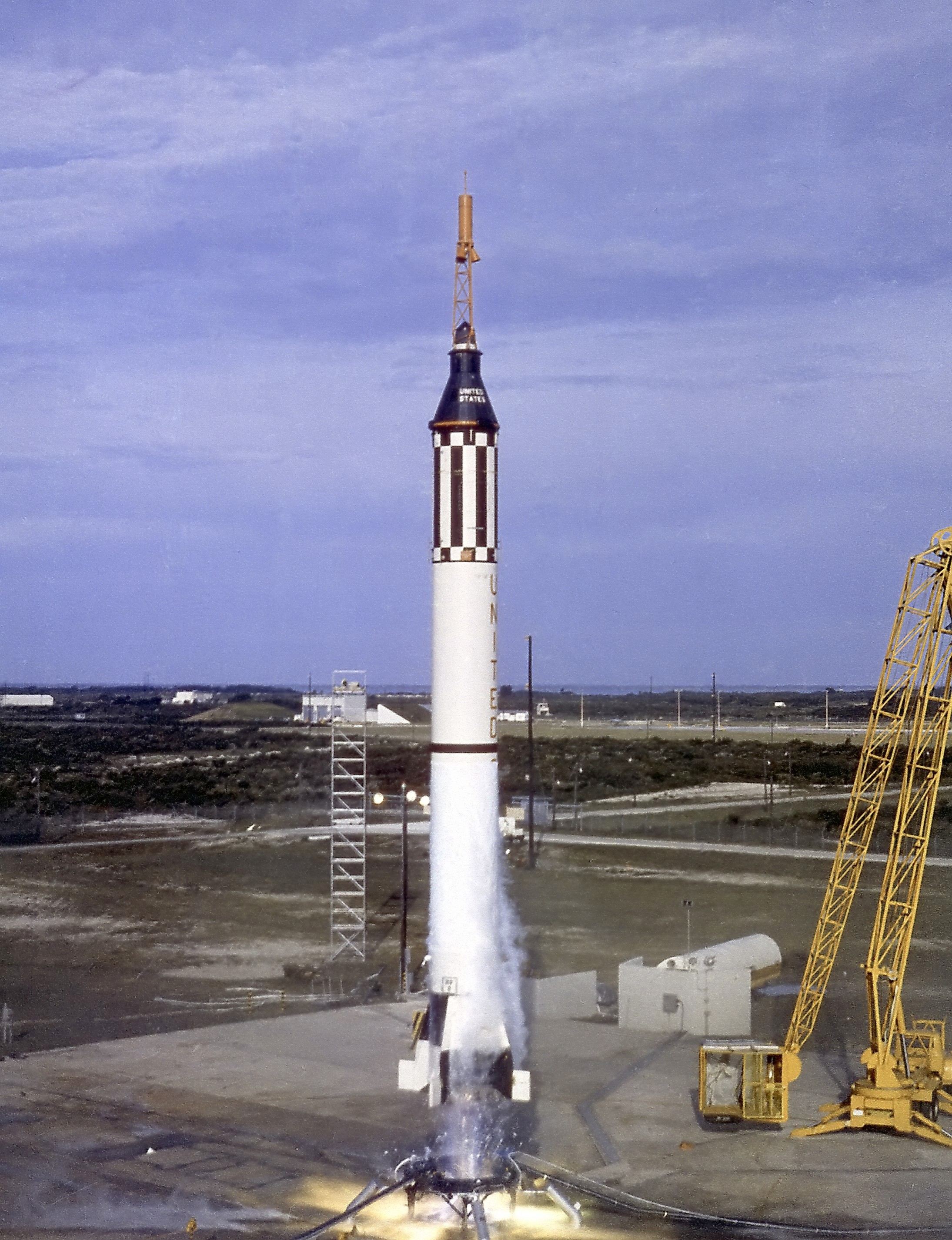
Launch of Mercury-Redstone 4 at Cape Canaveral Air Force Station Launch Complex 5

Grissom later admitted at the postflight debriefing that he was "a bit scared" at liftoff, but he added that he soon gained confidence along with the acceleration increase. Hearing the engine roar at the pedestal, he thought that his elapsed-time clock had started late. Like Shepard, he was amazed at the smooth quality of the liftoff, but then he noticed gradually more severe vibrations. These were never violent enough to impair his vision.

Grissom's cabin pressure sealed off at the proper altitude, about 27,000 ft (8.2 km), and he felt elated that the environmental control system was in good working order. The cabin and suit temperatures, respectively about 57.5 and 97 °F (14.2 and 36.1 °C) were quite comfortable. Watching his instruments for the pitch rate of the Redstone, Grissom saw it follow directions as programmed, tilting over at about one deg/s.

During a 3 g (29 m/s^{2}) acceleration on the up-leg of his flight, Grissom noticed a sudden change in the color of the horizon from light blue to jet black. His attention was distracted by the noise of the tower-jettison rocket firing on schedule. Grissom felt the separation, and he watched the tower through the window as it drifted off, trailing smoke, to his right. At two minutes and 22 seconds after launch, the Redstone's Rocketdyne engine cut off after building a speed of 6,561 ft/s (2,000 m/s). Grissom had a strong sensation of tumbling during the transition from high to zero acceleration, and, while he had become familiar with this sensation in centrifuge training, for a moment he lost his bearings.

The Redstone coasted for 10 seconds after its engine cut off; then a sharp report signaled that the posigrade rockets were popping the spacecraft loose from the booster. Although Grissom peered out his window throughout his ship's turnaround maneuver, he never caught sight of his booster.

=== Ballistic flight ===
With turnaround accomplished, the Air Force jet pilot for the first time became a space pilot, assuming manual-proportional control. A constant urge to look out the window made concentrating on his control tasks difficult. He told Shepard back in Mercury Control that the panorama of Earth's horizon, presenting an 800 mi (1,300 km) arc at peak altitude, was fascinating. His instruments rated a poor second to the spectacle below.

Turning reluctantly to his dials and control stick, Grissom made a pitch movement change, but was past his desired mark. He jockeyed the handcontroller stick for position, trying to damp out all oscillations, then made a yaw movement and went too far in that direction. By the time the proper attitude was attained, the short time allocated for these maneuvers had been used, so he omitted the roll movement altogether. Grissom found the manual controls very sluggish when compared to the Mercury procedures trainer. He then switched to the new rate command control system and found perfect response, although fuel consumption was high.

After the pitch and yaw maneuvers, Grissom made a roll-over movement so he could see the ground from his window. Some land beneath the clouds (later determined to be western Florida around the Apalachicola area) appeared in the hazy distance, but the pilot was unable to identify it. Suddenly Cape Canaveral came into view so clearly that Grissom found it hard to believe that his slant-range was over 150 mi (240 km).

He saw Merritt Island, the Banana River, the Indian River, and what appeared to be a large airport runway. South of Cape Canaveral, he saw what he believed to be West Palm Beach.

=== Reentry ===
With Liberty Bell 7 at an altitude of 118.26 mi (190.32 km), it was now time to position the spacecraft in its reentry attitude. Grissom had initiated the retrorocket sequence and the spacecraft was arcing downward. His pulse reached 171 beats per minute. Retrofire gave him the distinct and peculiar feeling that he had reversed his backward flight through space and was actually moving face forward. As he plummeted downward, he saw what appeared to be two of the spent retrorockets pass across the periscope view after the retrorocket package had been jettisoned.

Pitching the spacecraft over into a reentry attitude of 14 degrees from Earth-vertical, the pilot tried to see the stars out his observation window. Instead the glare of sunlight filled his cabin, making it difficult to read the panel dials, particularly those with blue lights. Grissom thought that he would not have noticed the 0.05 g (0.5 m/s^{2}) light if he had not known it was about to flash on.

Reentry presented no problem. Grissom could not feel the oscillations following the acceleration buildup; he could only read them on the rate indicators. Meanwhile, he continued to report to the Mercury Control Center on his electric current reading, fuel quantity, acceleration, and other instrument indications. Condensation and smoke trailed off the heatshield at about 65,000 ft (20 km) as Liberty Bell 7 plunged back into the atmosphere.

The drogue parachute deployed on schedule at 21,000 ft (6.4 km). Grissom said he saw the deployment and felt some resulting pulsating motion, but not enough to worry him. Main parachute deployment occurred at 12,300 ft (3.7 km), which was about 1,000 ft (300 m) higher than the design nominal altitude. Watching the main chute unfurl, Grissom spotted a 6 in (150 mm) L-shaped tear and another 2 in (51 mm) puncture in the canopy. Although he worried about them, the holes grew no bigger and his rate of descent soon slowed to about 28 ft/s (8.5 m/s). Dumping his peroxide control fuel, the pilot began transmitting his panel readings.

=== Splashdown ===
A "clunk" confirmed that the landing bag had dropped in preparation for impact. Grissom then removed his oxygen hose and opened his visor, but deliberately left the suit ventilation hose attached. Impact was milder than he had expected, although the spacecraft heeled over in the water until Grissom was lying on his left side. He thought he was facing downward. The spacecraft gradually righted itself, and, as the window cleared the water, Grissom jettisoned the reserve parachute and activated the rescue aids switch. Liberty Bell 7 still appeared to be watertight, although it was rolling badly with the swells.

Preparing for recovery, he disconnected his helmet and checked himself for debarkation. The neck dam did not unroll easily; Grissom tinkered with his suit collar to ensure his buoyancy in the event that he had to get out of the spacecraft quickly. When the recovery helicopters, which had taken to the air at launch time and visually followed the contrails and parachute descent, were still about 2 mi (3.2 km) from the impact point, which was only 3 mi (4.8 km) beyond the bullseye, Lieutenant James L. Lewis, the pilot of the primary recovery helicopter, radioed Grissom to ask if he was ready for pickup. He replied that he wanted them to wait five minutes while he recorded his cockpit panel data. Using a grease pencil with the pressure suit gloves was awkward, and several times the suit ventilation caused the neck dam to balloon, but Grissom simply placed his finger between neck and dam to allow the air to escape.

==== Hatch blows open ====
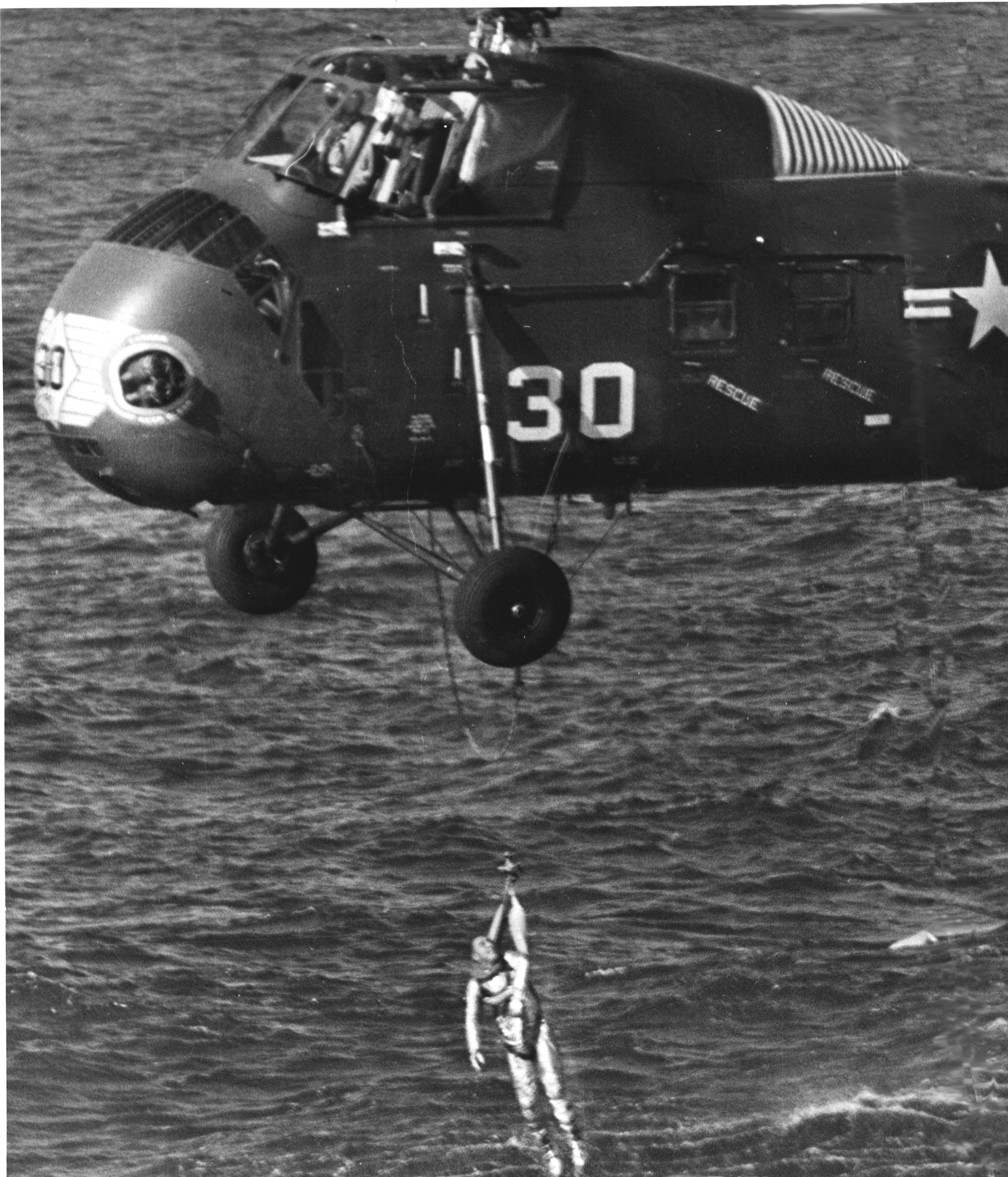
Grissom is hoisted to safety following the sinking of Liberty Bell 7

After logging the panel data, Grissom asked the helicopters to begin the approach for pickup. He removed the pin from the hatch-cover detonator and lay back in the couch. "I was lying there, minding my own business," he said afterward, "when I heard a dull thud." The hatch cover blew away, and salt water splashed into the spacecraft as it bobbed in the ocean. The capsule began taking on water and started to sink.

Grissom had difficulty recollecting his actions at this point, but he was certain that he had not touched the hatch-activation plunger. He had earlier unbuckled himself from most of his harness; he now removed his helmet, grasped the instrument panel with his right hand, and climbed though the hatchway.

The copilot of the nearest recovery helicopter said that as he was preparing, per procedure, to cut off the spacecraft's antenna whip with a squib-actuated cutter at the end of a pole, the hatch cover flew off, struck the water about 5 ft (1.5 m) away, then skipped over the waves. Next he saw Grissom climb through the hatch and swim away.

==== Failed spacecraft recovery ====
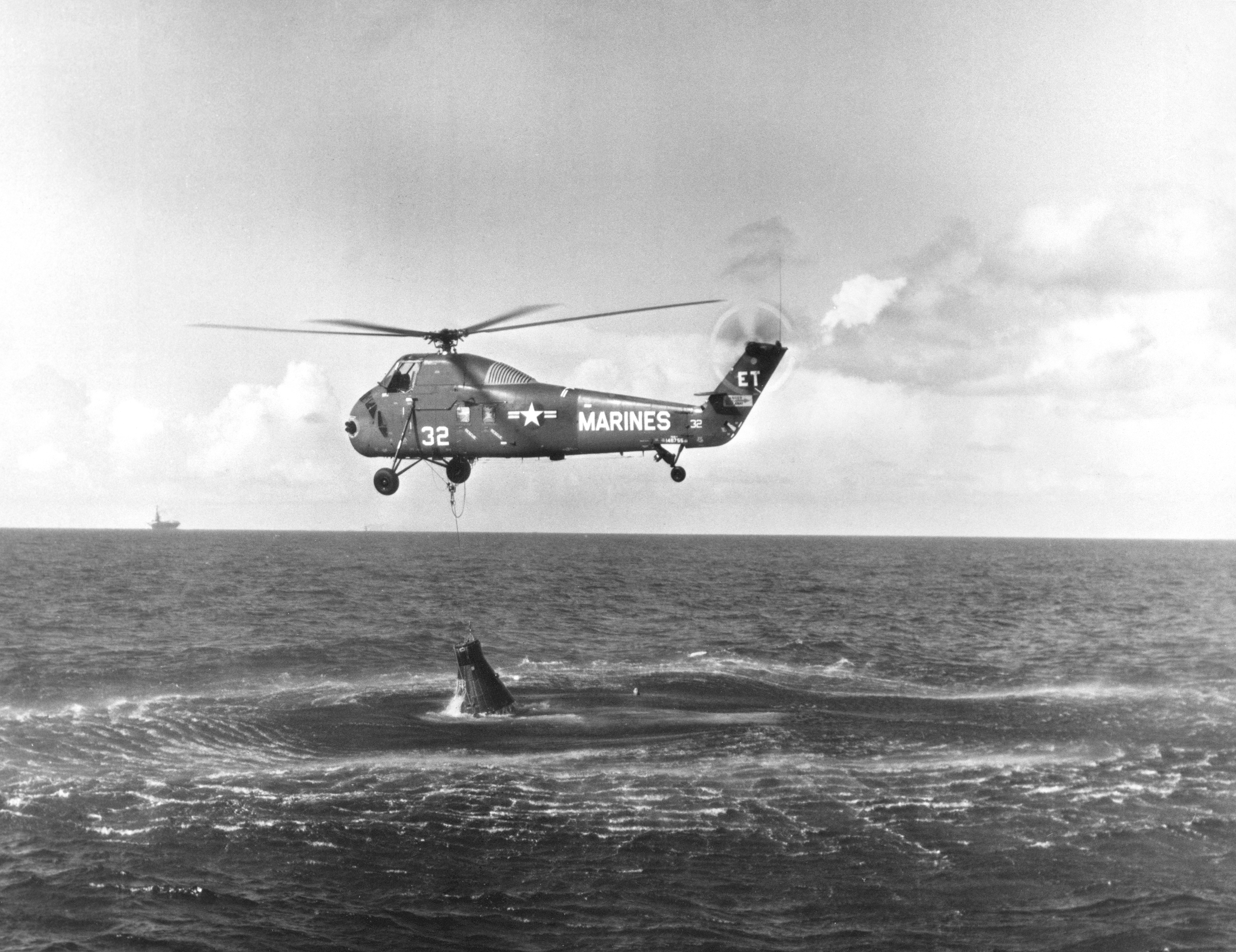
HUS-1 helicopter attempting to recover the Liberty Bell 7 spacecraft. The recovery ship USS Randolph is visible in the distance.

Leaving aside the swimming astronaut, Lewis completed his approach to the sinking spacecraft, as both he and co-pilot John Reinhard were intent on spacecraft recovery. This action was a conditioned reflex based on past training experience. While training off the Virginia beaches the helicopter pilots had noted that the astronauts seemed at home in and to enjoy the water. So Reinhard quickly cut the high-frequency antenna as soon as the helicopter reached Liberty Bell 7. Throwing aside the antenna cutting device, Reinhard picked up the shepherd's-hook recovery pole and carefully threaded the crook through the recovery loop on top of the spacecraft. By this time Lewis had lowered the helicopter to assist Reinhard in his task to a point that the helicopter's three wheels were in the water. The capsule sank out of sight, but the pickup pole twanged as the attached cable went taut, indicating to the helicopter pilots that they had made the catch.

Reinhard immediately prepared to pass the floating astronaut the personnel hoist, but at that moment Lewis called a warning that a detector light had flashed on the instrument panel, indicating that metal chips were in the oil sump because of engine strain. Considering the implication of impending engine failure, Lewis told Reinhard to retract the personnel hoist while he called the second helicopter to retrieve Grissom.

Meanwhile, Grissom, having made certain that he was not snared by any lines, noticed that the primary helicopter was having trouble raising the submerged spacecraft. He swam back to the spacecraft to see if he could assist, but found the cable properly attached. When he looked up for the personnel line, he saw the helicopter start to move away.

Suddenly, Grissom realized that he was not riding as high in the water as he had been. All the time he had been in the water he kept feeling air escape through the neck dam. The more air he lost, the less buoyancy he had. Moreover, he had forgotten to secure his suit inlet valve. Swimming was becoming difficult, and now with the second helicopter moving in he found the rotor wash between the two aircraft was making swimming more difficult. Bobbing under the waves, Grissom was scared, angry, and looking for a swimmer from one of the helicopters to help him tread water. Then he caught sight of a familiar face, that of George Cox, aboard the second helicopter. Cox was the copilot who had retrieved both the chimpanzee Ham and Shepard on the first Mercury flight. With his head barely above water, Grissom found the sight of Cox heartening.

Cox tossed the "horse-collar" lifeline straight to Grissom, who immediately wrapped himself into the sling backwards. Lack of orthodoxy mattered little to Grissom now, for he was on his way to the safety of the helicopter, even though swells dunked him twice more before he got aboard. His first thought was to get a life preserver on. Grissom had been either swimming or floating for a period of only four or five minutes, "although it seemed like an eternity to me," as he said afterward.

As the first helicopter moved away from Grissom, it struggled to raise the spacecraft high enough to drain the water from the impact bag. At one point the spacecraft was almost clear of the water, but like an anchor it prevented the helicopter from moving forward. The flooded capsule weighed over 5,000 pounds (2,300 kg), 1,000 lb (450 kg) beyond the helicopter's lifting capacity. The pilot, watching his insistent red warning light, decided not to chance losing two craft in one day. He finally cast loose, allowing the spacecraft to sink swiftly. Martin Byrnes, aboard the carrier, suggested that a marker be placed at the point so that the spacecraft might be recovered later. Rear Admiral J. E. Clark advised Byrnes that in that area the depth was about 2,800 fathoms (5.1 km; 16,800 ft; 3.2 mi).

==== Aftermath ====
Grissom stated that he did not blow the hatch. However a rumor started circulating that Grissom had intentionally blown the hatch prematurely. An independent technical review of the incident between August and October 1961 raised doubts regarding the theory that Grissom had blown the hatch and was responsible for the loss of the spacecraft. The Astronaut Office likely believed Grissom, since it maintained Grissom in the prime rotation spot for future flights, for example as the commander of the first Gemini flight, and the first planned Apollo flight.

Three Mercury flights later, Astronaut Wally Schirra manually blew Sigma 7's hatch after recovery when his spacecraft was on the deck of the recovery ship, in a deliberate attempt to dispel the rumor that Grissom might have blown the capsule's hatch deliberately. As anticipated, the kickback from the manual trigger left Schirra with a visible injury to his right hand. Grissom was uninjured when he exited the spacecraft, as documented by his postflight physical. This strongly supports his assertion that he did not accidentally hit the trigger, since in that case he would have been even more likely to injure himself.

In a 1965 interview, Grissom said that he believed the external release lanyard came loose, triggering the hatch release. On the Liberty Bell 7, this release lanyard was held in place by only one screw. This theory was accepted by Guenter Wendt, the Pad Leader for most early American crewed spaceflights.

During a launch simulation on Apollo 1 in 1967, the combination of a cabin fire and an inward-opening hatch contributed to the death of Grissom, as well as that of the astronauts Ed White and Roger B. Chaffee in a launch-pad fire. Use of an explosive hatch had been rejected following the discovery by engineers that an explosive egress system on a spacecraft could inadvertently fire without being triggered. Following the Apollo fire, Block II Apollo spacecraft were equipped with rapid-opening systems.

In 2021, analysis of video of the recovery suggested that static electricity may have caused the premature detonation of the hatch bolts. Helicopters are known to build up a charge of static electricity due to the rotors moving through the air. Marine Corps Lt. John Reinhard, the crewman aboard the helicopter who used a set of shears containing explosive charges to snip off the antenna on the floating spacecraft (to allow the helicopter to go lower) reported that "when I touched the antenna there was an arc, and both cutters fired. At the same time, the hatch came off. It could be that some static charge set [the hatch] off."

== Recovery of Liberty Bell 7 ==
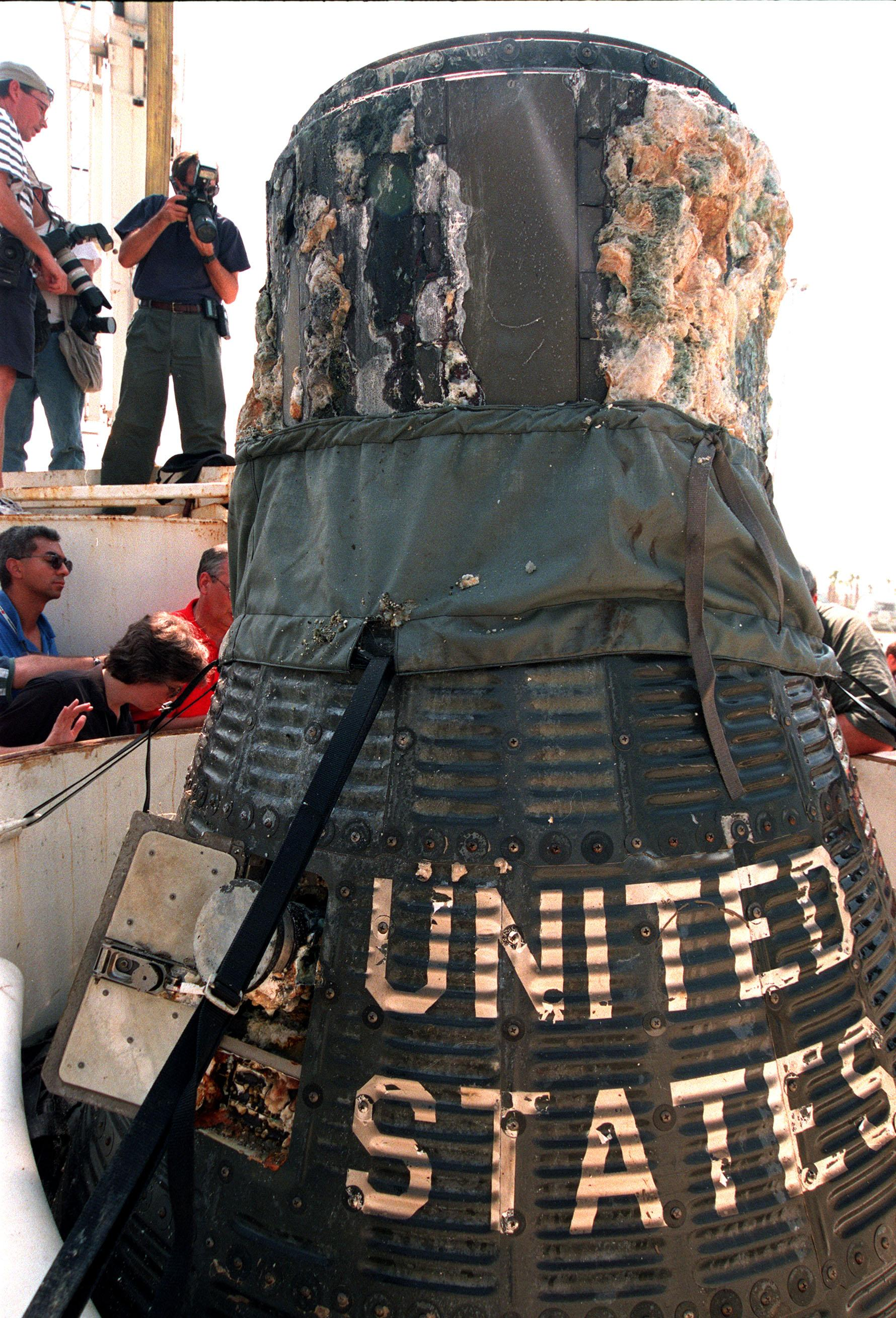
Liberty Bell 7 was recovered in 1999

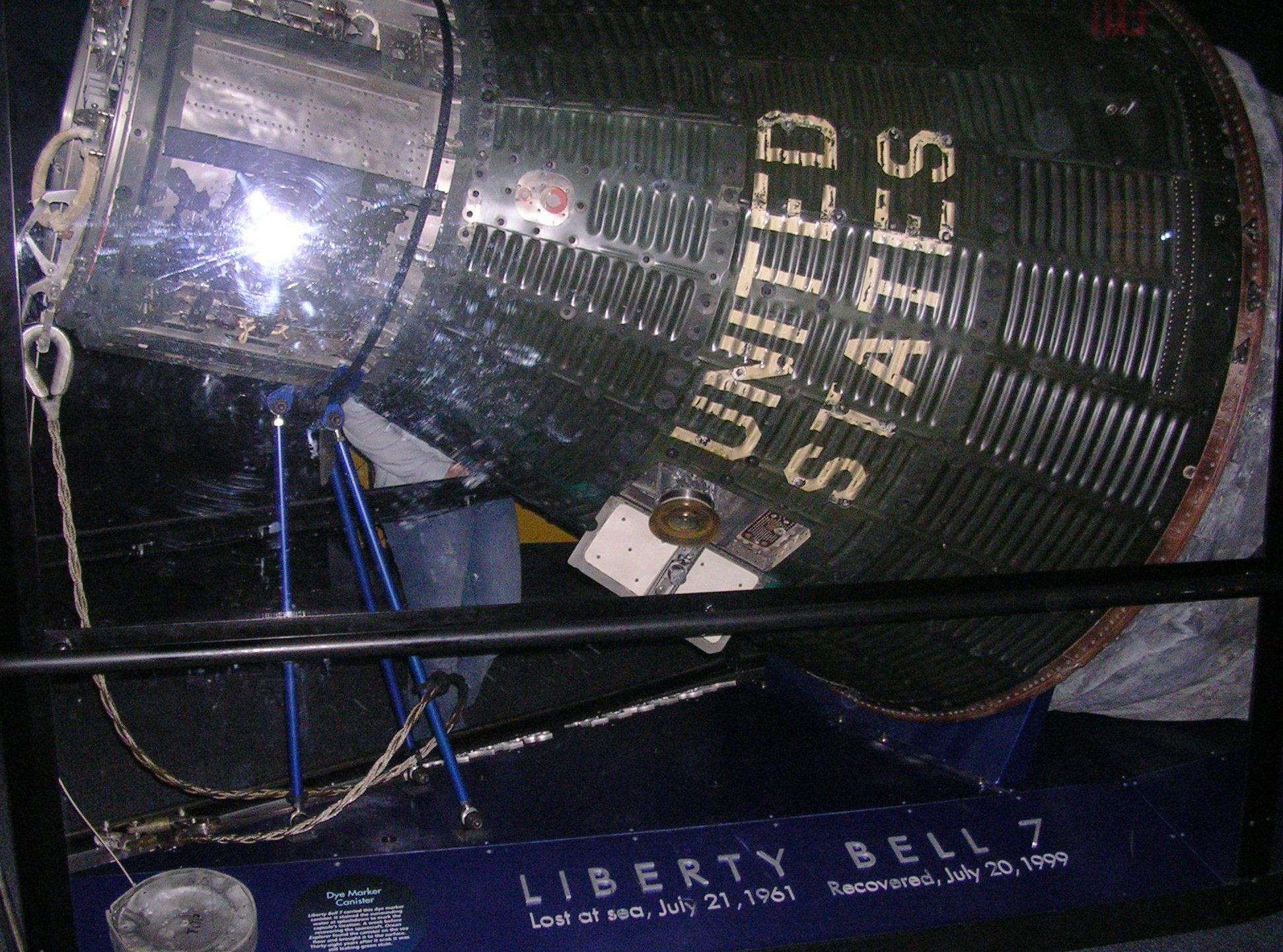
The restored spacecraft is currently displayed at the Cosmosphere in Hutchinson, Kansas.

After several unsuccessful attempts in 1992 and 1993, Oceaneering International, Inc. lifted the Liberty Bell 7 off the floor of the Atlantic Ocean and onto the deck of a recovery ship on July 20, 1999, the 30th anniversary of the Apollo 11 lunar landing and a day shy of the 38th anniversary of the loss of the Mercury capsule. The team was led by Curt Newport and financed by the Discovery Channel. The spacecraft was found after a 14-year effort by Newport at a depth of nearly 16,000 ft (4,900 m), 300 nmi (350 mi; 560 km) east-southeast of Cape Canaveral. Among the items found within were part of the flight gear and 35 Mercury dimes which had been taken to space to be souvenirs of the flight.

After Liberty Bell 7 was secured on the deck of the recovery ship, the "Ocean Project", experts removed and disposed of an explosive location device (SOFAR bomb) that was supposed to detonate in the event of the spacecraft's sinking, in order to pinpoint its position, but which had failed to explode. The spacecraft was then placed in a container filled with seawater to prevent further corrosion. The capsule's condition was consistent with what would have been expected from 38 years of lying in deep ocean water; the titanium hull and plastic components, all unaffected by salt water, survived basically intact while aluminum and steel components were extensively corroded and in some cases completely disintegrated—this included the steel instrument panels which were almost totally eroded away and their gauges and controls found lying in the astronaut's couch still attached to the wiring harnesses. Grissom's camera and its film rolls were recovered; the film was in poor condition and had no useable imagery in it. Also recovered were the astronaut's logbook, flashlight, survival knife, and 35 Mercury dimes. The Cosmosphere, in Hutchinson, Kansas, disassembled and cleaned the spacecraft, and it was released for a national tour through September 15, 2006. The spacecraft was then returned to the Cosmosphere where it is on permanent display. In 2016, it was temporarily lent to The Children's Museum of Indianapolis.

== Dramatization in film ==
Philip Kaufman's 1983 film The Right Stuff includes a dramatization of the Liberty Bell 7 mission in which Fred Ward played Gus Grissom. Additional fictional representations also occur in HBO's 1998 From the Earth to the Moon with Mark Rolston as Gus Grissom and 2016's Hidden Figures movie with Devin McGee as Gus Grissom.

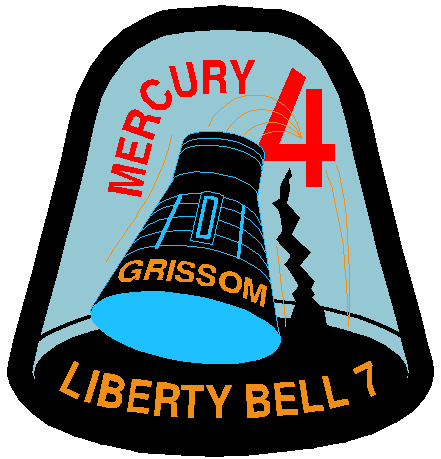
Mission insignia

== Timeline ==
T+ Time	Event	Description
T+00:00:00	Liftoff	Mercury-Redstone lifts off, onboard clock starts.
T+00:00:16	Pitch program	Booster (Redstone) begins pitching over at 2 deg/s from 90 deg to 45 deg.
T+00:00:40	End pitch program	Booster reaches 45 deg pitch.
T+00:01:24	Max Q	Maximum dynamic pressure ~575 lb_{f}/ft² (28 kPa).
T+00:02:20	BECO	Booster engine cutoff. Velocity 5,200 mph (2.3 km/s).
T+00:02:22	Tower jettison	Escape tower jettison, no longer needed.
T+00:02:24	Spacecraft separation	Posigrade rockets fire for 1 s giving 15 ft/s (4.6 m/s) separation.
T+00:02:35	Turnaround maneuver	ASCS (Automatic Stabilization and Control System) system rotates spacecraft 180 deg, to heat shield forward attitude. Nose is pitched down 34 deg to retro fire position.
T+00:05:00	Apogee	Apogee of about 115 mi (185 km) reached, about 150 mi (240 km) downrange from launch site.
T+00:05:15	Retrofire	Three retro rockets fire for 10 s each. They are started at 5 s intervals, firing overlaps. Delta-V of 550 ft/s (170 m/s) is taken off forward velocity.
T+00:05:45	Retract periscope	Periscope is automatically retracted in preparation for reentry.
T+00:06:15	Retro pack jettison	One minute after retrofire retro pack is jettisoned, leaving heatshield clear.
T+00:06:20	Retro attitude maneuver	ASCS orients spacecraft in 34 deg nose down pitch, 0 deg roll, 0 deg yaw.
T+00:07:15	.05 g maneuver	ASCS detects beginning of reentry and rolls spacecraft at 10 deg/s to stabilize spacecraft during reentry.
T+00:09:38	Drogue parachute deploy	Drogue parachute deployed at 22,000 ft (6.7 km) slowing descent to 365 ft/s (111 m/s) and stabilizing spacecraft.
T+00:09:45	Snorkel deploy	Fresh air snorkel deploys at 20,000 ft (6.1 km). Environmental control system switches to emergency oxygen rate to cool cabin.
T+00:10:15	Main parachute deploy	Main parachute deploys at 10,000 ft (3.0 km). Descent rate slows to 30 ft/s (9.1 m/s)
T+00:10:20	Landing bag deploy	Landing bag deploys, dropping heat shield down 4 ft (1.2 m).
T+00:10:20	Fuel dump	Remaining hydrogen peroxide fuel automatically dumped.
T+00:15:30	Splashdown	Spacecraft lands in water about 300 mi (480 km) downrange from launch site.
T+00:15:30	Rescue aids deploy	Rescue aid package deployed. The package includes green dye marker, recovery radio beacon and whip antenna.

== Cancellation of further suborbital missions ==
The original plan for Project Mercury was to fly four additional suborbital missions with the Redstone booster, numbered MR-5 through MR-8. John Glenn was tentatively assigned to fly MR-5. However, by the time of Grissom's flight, Project Mercury had fallen behind the original program timeline. Subsequently, NASA decided that it had accomplished all that could be accomplished with the suborbital flights, and there was also concern about falling behind the Soviet program. On August 18, NASA announced the cancellation of the remaining Mercury-Redstone flights, clearing the way for Glenn to fly a Mercury-Atlas mission as the first American to orbit the Earth.
