= Asagiri Station (Hyōgo) =

Railway station in Akashi, Hyōgo Prefecture, Japan

Asagiri Station 朝霧駅
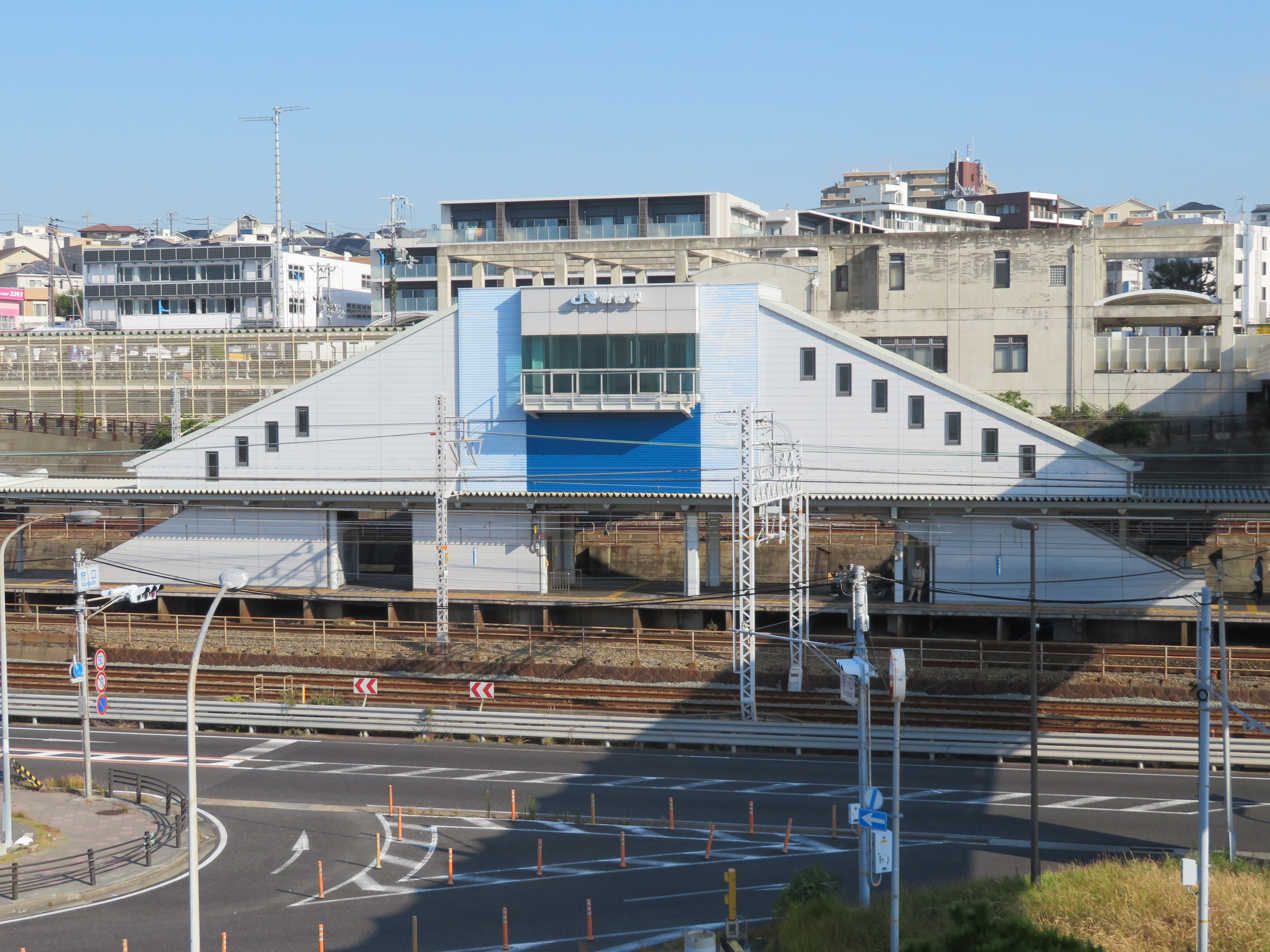
- Asagiri Station viewed south, November 2023

General information
- Location: 238 Ōkuradanikariguchi, Akashi-shi, Hyōgo-ken 673-0870; Japan
- Coordinates: 34°38′40″N 135°01′03″E
- Owner: West Japan Railway Company
- Operator: West Japan Railway Company
- Line: San'yō Main Line
- Distance: 17.0 km (10.6 miles) from Kobe
- Platforms: 1 island platform
- Tracks: 2
- Connections: Bus stop

Construction
- Structure type: Elevated
- Accessible: Yes

Other information
- Status: Staffed (Midori no Madoguchi)
- Station code: JR-A72
- Website: Official website

History
- Opened: 20 June 1968

Passengers
- FY2019: 16,069 daily
Location
- Location within Hyōgo Prefecture Location within Japan

Asagiri Station (朝霧駅, Asagiri-eki) is a passenger railway station located in the city of Akashi, Hyōgo Prefecture, Japan, operated by the West Japan Railway Company (JR West).

== Lines ==
Asagiri Station is served by the JR San'yō Main Line (also referred to as the JR Kobe Line), and is located 17.0 kilometers from the terminus of the line at Kobe and 50.1 kilometers from Osaka.

== Station layout ==
The station consists of one island platform and two tracks. It also features two additional bypass tracks which are normally utilized by Special Rapid train service. The station has a Midori no Madoguchi staffed ticket office.

=== Platforms ===
1	■ JR Kobe Line	for Sannomiya, Amagasaki, and Osaka
2	■ JR Kobe Line	for Nishi-Akashi and Himeji

== Adjacent stations ==
«	Service	»
JR West
Sanyō Main Line (JR Kobe Line)
Maiko	Local	Akashi
Limited Express Super Hakuto: Does not stop at this station
Limited Express Hamakaze: Does not stop at this station
Commuter Limited Express Rakuraku Harima: Does not stop at this station
Special Rapid: Does not stop at this station
Rapid: Does not stop at this station

== History ==
Asagiri Station opened on 20 June 1968. With the privatization of the Japan National Railways (JNR) on 1 April 1987, the station came under the aegis of the West Japan Railway Company.

Eleven people were killed and 247 injured in the Akashi pedestrian bridge accident that occurred on a pedestrian bridge leading to the station on 21 July 2001.

Station numbering was introduced in March 2018 with Asagiri being assigned station number JR-A72.

== Passenger statistics ==
In fiscal 2019, the station was used by an average of 16,069 passengers daily

== Surrounding area ==
- National Route 2
- National Route 28

== See also ==
- List of railway stations in Japan
