= Olaf Kopvillem =

Estonian singer

Olaf Kopvillem (1 November 1926 – 23 July 1997) was a prominent Estonian World War II refugee. Having settled in Canada, he engaged in the organisation of Estonian exile activities there, and is known for his numerous humorous covers of well-known songs.

Kopvillem was born in Kiviõli, Estonia. As a high school student, he joined Eesti Omakaitse and was recruited in the German army, come World War II. In 1944, he emigrated to Germany and later to Canada, where he graduated from Sir George Williams University majoring in chemistry.

Kopvillem headed Montreal Estonian female choir, and was for almost 20 years the leader of Montreal Estonian mixed choir. He also taught at Vikerlased, a folk music group.

He died in Burlington, Ontario, Canada or 23 July 1997 in Toronto, Ontario, Canada, of Parkinson's disease.

== Awards ==
In 1996, Olaf Kopvillem was awarded the Meie Mats.

== Reuse ==
A number of Kopvillem's melodies and lyrics have been covered in couplet songs by Talong.

== Discography ==
- Vindilised viisid

1. Pastoraal
2. Puhkus
3. Eluloolised märkmed
4. Nii me elame
5. Tsivillisatsioon
6. Immigrant Austriast
7. Jõulud
8. Võta käru ja käruta
9. Sauna taga, tiigi ääres

- Viise ja vinte

1. Videvik
2. Arm küll polnud see
3. Romanss
4. Sügisüksildus
5. September
6. Cachita
7. Sularaha eest
8. Rio Grand
9. Koduigatsus
10. Klunker

- Lenda, lenda, lepalind

1. Lenda, lenda, lepalind
2. Rannal
3. Rohutirts
4. Kevadtuul ja sina
5. Ball
6. Sügis
7. Igatsus
8. Sigarett
9. Üks naljakas laul
