= Pierre Roullier =

French flautist and conductor

Pierre Roullier (born 16 February 1954 in Rabat), is a French flautist and conductor.

== Biography ==
Roullier first studied mathematics and philosophy. He obtained the first prize for flute unanimously at the Conservatoire de Paris, in Jean-Pierre Rampal's class. He was also first prize in chamber music, and took advanced courses in this discipline.

He was laureate of the International competition of Munich, Gaudeamus competition (Amsterdam) for contemporary classical music, and that of Martigny.

He was soloist flautist of the Orchestre de chambre de Paris from 1979 to 1988.

Since 1988, he has been leading a conductor's activity where he covers a broad repertoire ranging from operetta to contemporary creation in places as diverse as the Opéra-Comique, the Wiener Festwochen (Austria), Radio France, the Festival d’Avignon, the Kunsthalle Bremen.

Invited by the Opéra de Nice, the Sofia Philharmonic Orchestra and the Osaka Philharmonic Orchestra, he performed in the most important venues. He conducted the Orchestre national des Pays de la Loire, the Orchestre national d'Île-de-France and premiered Jean-Pierre Drouet's opera Vertiges at the Grand Théâtre de Bordeaux. He has performed at the Angers-Nantes Opéra and the Grand Théâtre de Tours. He premiered and recorded Paul Méfano's opera Micromégas at the Festival de Radio France and Montpellier, Régis Campo's opera Hatim le Généreux at the Opéra de Besançon and Bruno Mantovani's Cantata n° 1 based on poems by Rainer Maria Rilke at the Musica Festival of Strasbourg.

His recordings cover a vast repertoire ranging from Johann Sebastian Bach to Tôru Takemitsu, from Beethoven to Dusapin and Strasnoy. They have received critical acclaim and prestigious awards: Académie du disque français, Académie Charles-Cros, Académie du disque lyrique.
