= Albert Mannheimer =

American screenwriter

Albert Mannheimer (9 March 1913, in New York City, New York – 19 March 1972, in Los Angeles County, California) was an American writer, principally of screenplays, including the Academy Award-nominated screenplay for Born Yesterday, which screenplay also received the Writers Guild of America award for Best Written American Comedy Award.

He was a protégé of philosopher-novelist Ayn Rand in the late 1940s and early 1950s. His relationship with Rand is covered in two recent (as of 2010) books - Ayn Rand and the World She Made by Anne C. Heller and Goddess of the Market by Jennifer Burns.

== Selected work ==
- Broadway Melody of 1940 - uncredited work
- Song of the Open Road
- Three Daring Daughters
- Born Yesterday
- Bloodhounds of Broadway
- Gidget (television series)
- Love on a Rooftop
