= Léo Chauliac =

French jazz pianist and composer

Léo Chauliac, né Léon Chauliac (6 February 1913 – 27 October 1977), was a French jazz pianist, composer and conductor.

A jazz pianist in the 1930s, Léo Chauliac was the accompanist of Charles Trenet from 1941 to 1943, a singer for whom he composed many popular songs. He rubbed shoulders and played with the greatest musicians of the time: Hubert Rostaing, Aimé Barelli, Alix Combelle and Henri Crolla. For a while, as conductor of the orchestra of the famous restaurant Maxim's, he will be the companion for some records by André Claveau and Jacqueline Danno. But it was above all with Jean-Claude Pascal that he wove a long musical career in the 1960s, orchestrating among other things Nous les amoureux, winner of the 1961 Eurovision Song Contest.

== Career ==
Born in 1913 in Marseille, Chauliac began his piano studies at the Conservatoire de Marseille where he won a first prize after two years. Then, he came to Paris where he worked with José Iturbi and especially his sister Amparo Iturbi and followed the courses of the Conservatoire de Paris. On November 15, 1930, he was admitted to Santiago Riera's piano class, which he followed until 1935. In 1931 he obtained the 2nd Medal of Solfeggio, in 1932 the 2nd Piano Prize and in 1933, the 1st Piano Prize. During his musical studies at the Conservatoire de Paris, he was in the same class as Maurice Baquet, Henri Betti, Paul Bonneau, Henri Dutilleux, Pierre Spiers and Raymond Trouard.

He started playing jazz and then played in a Parisian club, Le Fétiche. In 1934–1935, he was a pianist in the "Grégor et ses Grégoriens" orchestra. He then toured with commercial orchestras such as that of Eddie Foy Sr. With the latter, he performed at the end of 1936 at "Le Bœuf sur le toit". In 1937, he played at the "Swing Time" in André Ekyans orchestra.

In 1938, he met Charles Trenet and worked with him until 1943 as an accompanist pianist and composed songs. In 1939, he participated in the elaboration of the melody of La Mer, but, absent on the day of the presentation at the Raoul Breton publishing house, it was Albert Lasry, pianist of the editions who co-wrote with Charles Trenet the music for this future international success. Among the songs written by Chauliac, notably for Charles Trenet, are Marie Marie, La Romance de Paris, Douce France and Que reste-t-il de nos amours ?. In February 1941, he was part of the Quintette du Hot Club de France that accompanied Charles Trenet on a recording.

At the Liberation of France, Léo Chauliac was part of the Schubert orchestra with André Ekyan, Emmanuel Soudieux, Pierre Fouad and Henri Crolla. He also performed in the formation of Alix Combelle. In 1945, he was also to become Claude Bolling's teacher. In the 1940s, he gave jazz concerts in Salle Gaveau and at the École normale de musique de Paris, notably with Emmanuel Soudieux and Pierre Fouad. He performed in trio in 1946 at Carrere Records and the Palm Beach in Cannes.

He died on 27 October 1977 at his home in rue de Constantinople and is buried at cimetière des Batignolles (17th division).

== Bibliography ==
- Boris Vian, Écrits sur le jazz, Le Livre de Poche, 1999, ISBN 2253168939, 978-2253168935: Vian interviews Chauliac, November 1946 on Google Livres
