= Violin Sonata (Poulenc) =

Chamber music by Francis Poulenc

Sonate pour violon et piano Violin Sonata
- Chamber music by Francis Poulenc
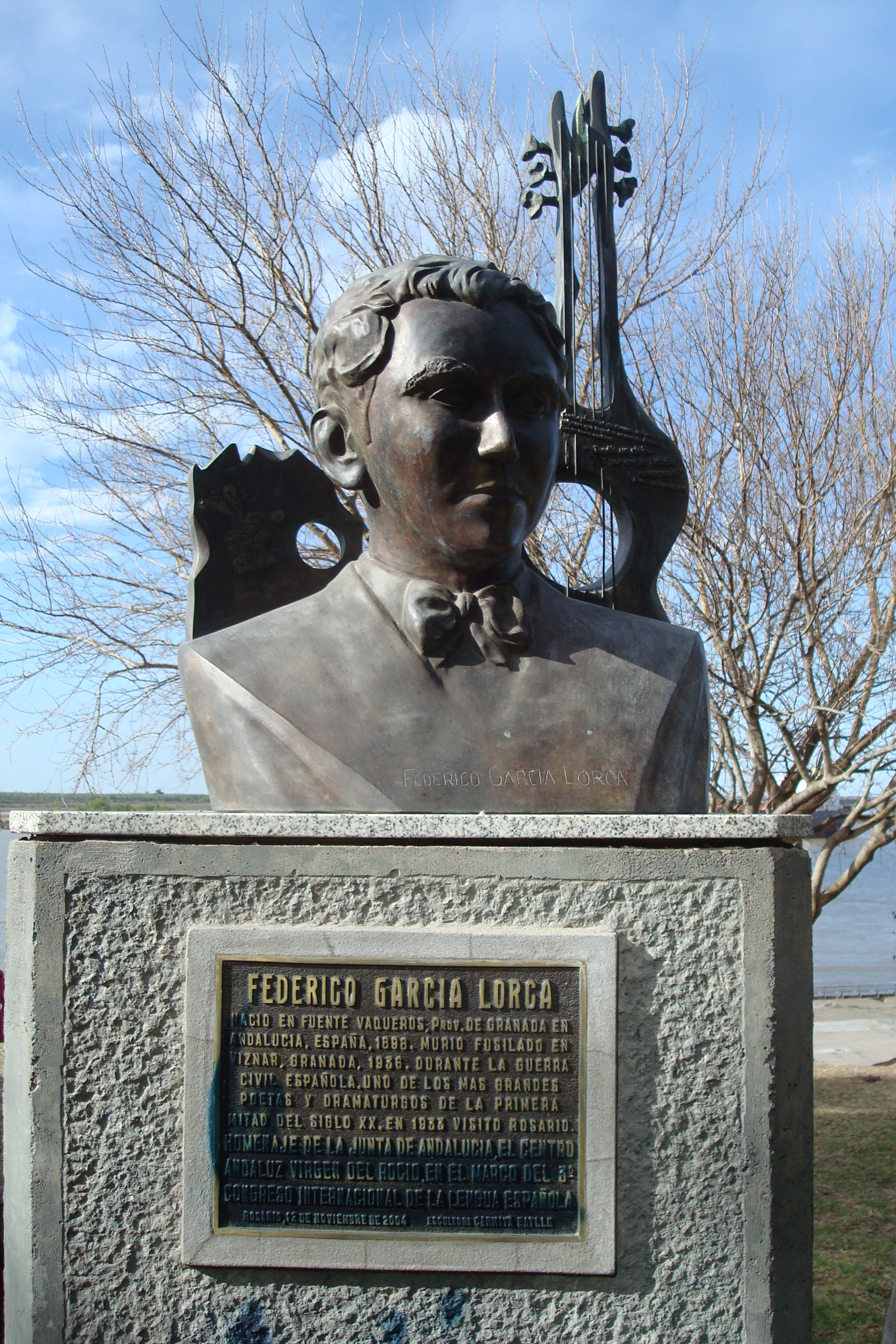
- Bust of the poet Federico García Lorca, in whose memory the sonata was written
- Catalogue: FP 119
- Composed: 1942–1943
- Dedication: In memory of Federico García Lorca
- Performed: 21 June 1943: Paris
- Published: 1944
- Movements: Three
- Scoring: Violin and piano

The Sonate pour violon et piano (Violin Sonata), FP 119, by Francis Poulenc was written between the summer of 1942 and Easter 1943 and is dedicated to the memory of the Spanish poet Federico García Lorca, who was shot at the beginning of the Spanish Civil War. It was at least the fourth violin sonata Poulenc had begun since 1918 and the only one he preserved. Ginette Neveu, who had asked him for the work and advised him on the violin writing, gave the first performance with the composer at the piano on 21 June 1943 at the Salle Gaveau in Paris.

The three movements, Allegro con fuoco, Intermezzo and Presto tragico, last about 15 to 18 minutes in performance. Poulenc thought the result was not among his best music, and its critical reception has been largely unfavourable, although the sonata has been recorded many times.

== Background ==
Poulenc, the youngest of the composers known as Les Six, wrote about ten chamber works over the course of his career, most of them for wind instruments, for which he composed a trio in 1926 and a sextet completed in 1940. Only two of his sonatas are for a string instrument, and both date from the war years: the Cello Sonata, sketched in 1940 and taken up again in 1948 at the request of Pierre Fournier, and the violin sonata.

The sonata of 1942–43 was at least Poulenc's fourth attempt at the combination of violin and piano. In 1918 he wrote a sonata in three movements, Prélude, Air and Final, for the violinist Hélène Jourdan-Morhange; it was first played that December at a concert of the Lyre et Palette series, with Marcel Meyer at the piano, and in March 1919 Poulenc announced that he had destroyed it. A second sonata, intended for Jelly d'Arányi, the dedicatee of Ravel's Tzigane, occupied him from 1925. He told Stravinsky in September of that year that it would have four movements, a Largo, an Allegro, a Romance and a Gigue, and he reported to Paul Collaer in November 1926 that the Largo and the Romance were finished, adding "How difficult music is!" By 1929 the plan had grown to five linked movements, and in a letter to André Schaeffner of 11 November he gave himself the choice of losing everything or hitting the target; the sonata went on the fire. A third attempt followed: in September 1933 he told Henri Sauguet that he was finishing a violin sonata begun eighteen months earlier, and in December 1936 he sent the publisher Jacques Lerolle four bars of the theme of its Interlude and promised the work before the year was out. None of the three survives.

=== Composition ===
Poulenc named Brahms and Debussy as the only composers since the classical period to have solved what he called the arduous problem of balance between violin and piano. In October 1942 he told Schaeffner that "the monster is finished", the name he had given the sketch, and that the work was very different from the perpetual violin-and-melody line of the French sonatas of the nineteenth century; the violin as a prima donna over piano arpeggios, he added, made him sick.

The sonata was written at Noizay, near Amboise in Touraine, where Poulenc had bought a property in 1927 and fitted out a music room with two pianos. The work was written at the request of Ginette Neveu, then at the beginning of her career. Poulenc met her several times to ask about the technical possibilities and the sound of the violin, and he credited her with the score's violinistic details. He told the critic Claude Rostand that he did not like the violin "in the singular", but that he could not resist a suggestion from Neveu.

Poulenc had long wanted to write something in memory of the Spanish poet Federico García Lorca, who was shot at the beginning of the Spanish Civil War in 1936. García Lorca had been drawn to the guitar from childhood, studied piano and harmony, and in 1922 organised with Manuel de Falla a competition of traditional cante jondo song. Poulenc took his starting point from a line of García Lorca's poem "Las seis cuerdas" of 1921, which in French reads "La guitare fait pleurer les songes" (the guitar makes dreams weep) and stands at the head of the second movement. He composed that movement first, as a vaguely Spanish andante cantilena, then the Presto tragico finale, whose momentum is broken by a slow coda, and last the opening movement, which was to set the mood. Dissatisfied with the finale, he rewrote it in 1949.

=== Premiere ===
Neveu and Poulenc gave the first performance on 21 June 1943 at the Salle Gaveau in Paris, in one of the Concerts de la Pléiade founded by Gaston Gallimard; the concert was held for the benefit of imprisoned writers and musicians. Lemaître describes the reception as a resounding success owed chiefly to the violinist, and the notes to the RCA recording of Poulenc's complete chamber music likewise record that Neveu's playing was appreciated while the work itself was criticised. Neveu played the sonata again some time later with her brother Jean at the piano.

=== Manuscript and publication ===
The autograph is in the music department of the Bibliothèque nationale de France in Paris, carrying a Sacem stamp dated 20 December 1943. It forms part of a bound volume of more than eighty pages measuring 34 by 26.5 cm, of which the sonata, written in blue ink, occupies 38. The second, unpaginated leaf carries the dedication of the work to the memory of García Lorca, whose year of birth is given there as 1899, together with an inscription of the manuscript to Poulenc's niece Brigitte Manceaux, dated Le Tremblay, August 1946, in which he tells her that it is not from the best of himself. The last page gives the place and dates of composition as Noizay, summer 1942 and Easter 1943. Twenty-two blank leaves follow the sonata, the first of them inscribed as a title page for a sonata for piano and cello in memory of Claude Debussy, dated 1943.

Max Eschig published the first edition in 1944 and a corrected edition in 1949 that substituted the rewritten third movement for the original. Durand published a new edition in 2021.

== Music ==
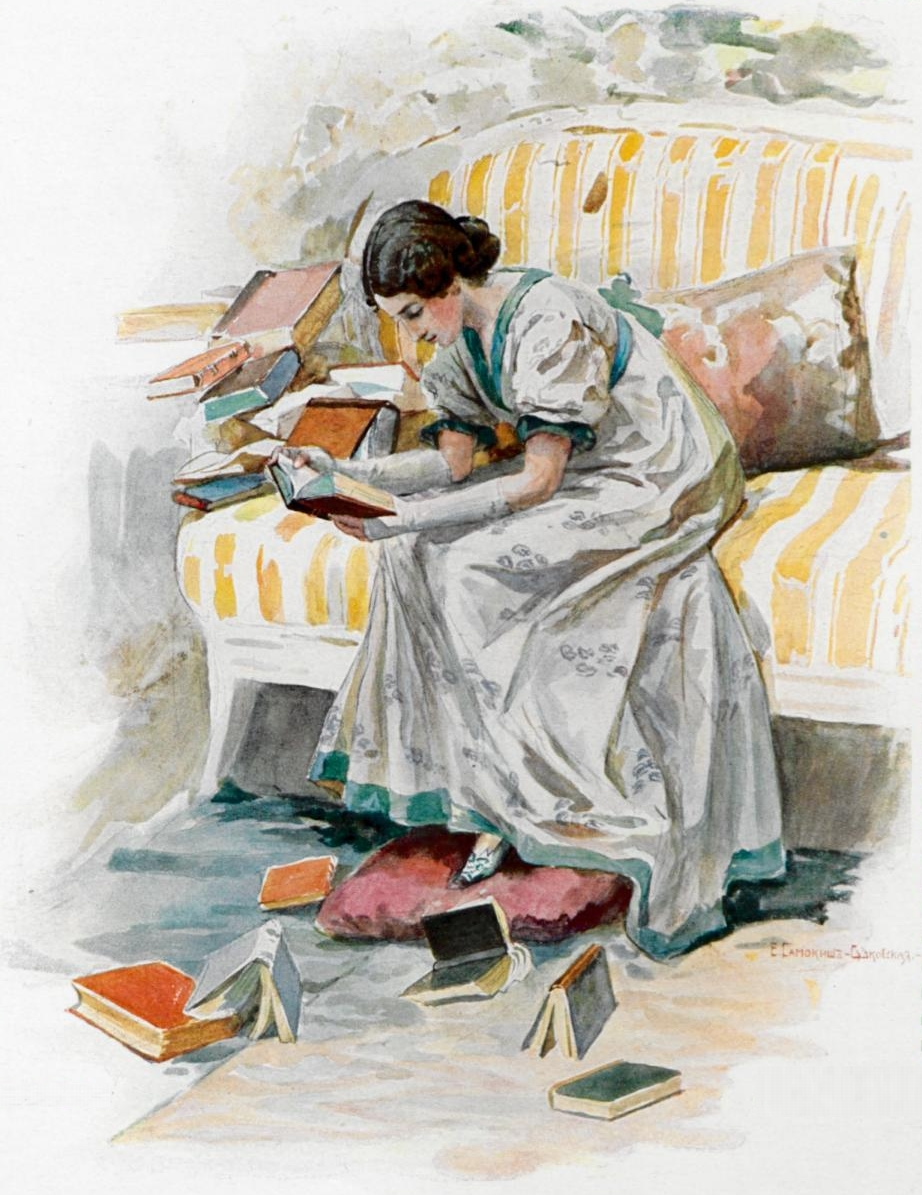
Tatiana, from Eugen Onegin by Elena Samokysh-Sudkovskaya, 1899

Like most of the composer's chamber works, the sonata adopts a fast–slow–fast three-movement plan and lasts 15 to 18 minutes, each movement running about five to six minutes:

1. Allegro con fuoco
2. Intermezzo
3. Presto tragico

The work uses borrowings, among them self-citations. The first movement quotes the first of the Trois poèmes de Louise Lalanne, and Poulenc takes up one of the oboe themes of the letter scene from Eugene Onegin by Pyotr Ilyich Tchaikovsky; the RCA notes also hear the thematic influence of Sergei Rachmaninoff. The violinist Noah Bendix-Balgley identifies the theme that enters in the third bar, alternating F natural and F sharp, as a distorted version of "Tea for Two", and observes that it returns in all three movements.

=== I. Allegro con fuoco ===
The first movement opens with loud pizzicato chords marked très sec (very dry) and très violent (very violent) over continuous semiquavers in the piano, and it closes with the same pizzicato gesture, which Bendix-Balgley compares to a gunshot. Lyrical material marked très doux (very sweet) interrupts the driving sections. At rehearsal figure 7 the piano march is marked f and violent while the violin plays pp, a disparity Bendix-Balgley reads as shadowing rather than accompaniment. After the climax comes a slow march he likens to Prokofiev, and the violin's entry in bar 133 anticipates the melody of the second movement.

=== II. Intermezzo ===
The Intermezzo is headed by the line from García Lorca, and the violin's pizzicato writing evokes the guitar; one passage is to be played sur la touche (on the fingerboard). The modulation to D major at figure 2 carries the instructions tendre et doux (tender and sweet), très expressif (very expressive) and très doux (very sweet), and the undulating motif in sixths from the first movement returns in the melody. A slow march in parallel intervals closes the movement, ending with a pizzicato and glissando over a sustained piano pedal. The RCA notes call the central passage in thirds for the violin the summit of the work and describe this movement as the furthest from the composer's usual harmonic language.

=== III. Presto tragico ===
The finale returns to the violence of the opening movement, with a brusque theme marked très violent and passages in alternating metres of 7/8, 5/8 and 3/8. A lighter melody with left-hand pizzicato in the violin follows, and at figure 15 the violin restates the first theme of the first movement in thirds. At figure 17 the piano falls to the bottom of its register and the violin plays a recitative marked fff and très violent et libre (very violent and free). Bendix-Balgley relates the harmony of the slow coda to that of Olivier Messiaen and, of the three pizzicato chords that end the work, asks whether they represent the shot that killed García Lorca or a bell rung in his memory, leaving the choice to the performer.

== Reception ==
In Journal de mes mélodies Poulenc wrote that he was struggling to bear musical witness to his passion for García Lorca and that the sonata dedicated to the poet's memory was "alas not the best Poulenc". The work was judged harshly by critics. Adélaïde de Place wrote in the Guide de la musique de chambre that it is "a little disappointing". The Poulenc biographer Henri Hell held that its only merit is to have been written in memory of García Lorca, and that Poulenc "is no longer quite Poulenc when he writes for the violin". Bendix-Balgley describes the sonata as dramatic and haunting, alternating rhythmic drive, lyricism and dance music.

== Selected recordings ==
- Yehudi Menuhin and Jacques Février
- Josef Suk and Jan Panenka, 1967
- Dan Almgren and Stefan Bojsten. Recorded by SVT in 1985
- Detlef Hahn and Simon Parkin. Recorded in 2000

== Bibliography ==
- Hell, Henri (1978). Francis Poulenc (in French). Paris: Fayard. ISBN 2-213-00670-9.
- Machart, Renaud (1995). Poulenc (in French). Paris: Éditions du Seuil. ISBN 2-02-013695-3.
- Place, Adélaïde de (1989). "Francis Poulenc". In Tranchefort, François-René (ed.). Guide de la musique de chambre. Les Indispensables de la musique (in French). Paris: Fayard. ISBN 2-213-02403-0.
- Poulenc, Francis (1993). Journal de mes mélodies (in French). Paris: Cicéro Éditeurs, Salabert. ISBN 2-908369-10-9.
- Schmidt, Carl B. (1995). The Music of Francis Poulenc (1899–1963): A Catalogue (in English and French). Oxford: Clarendon Press. ISBN 978-0-19-158516-6.
- Lemaître, Edmond (2021). "How difficult music is". Sonate pour violon et piano. By Poulenc, Francis. Musique française. Translated by Anthony Marks. Paris: Durand. pp. VIII–IX. ISMN 979-0-044-09521-6.
- Bendix-Balgley, Noah (2021). "Notes on interpretation". Sonate pour violon et piano. By Poulenc, Francis. Musique française. Paris: Durand. pp. X–XI. ISMN 979-0-044-09521-6.
- "Sonates . Violon, piano. FP 119" (in French). BNF.
- Francis Poulenc – Intégrale Musique de chambre. RCA Red Seal. pp. 4–5.
- Catalog of Francis Poulenc's works. Éditions Salabert.
