= Cello Sonata (Poulenc) =

Sonate pour violoncelle et piano Cello Sonata
- Chamber music by Francis Poulenc
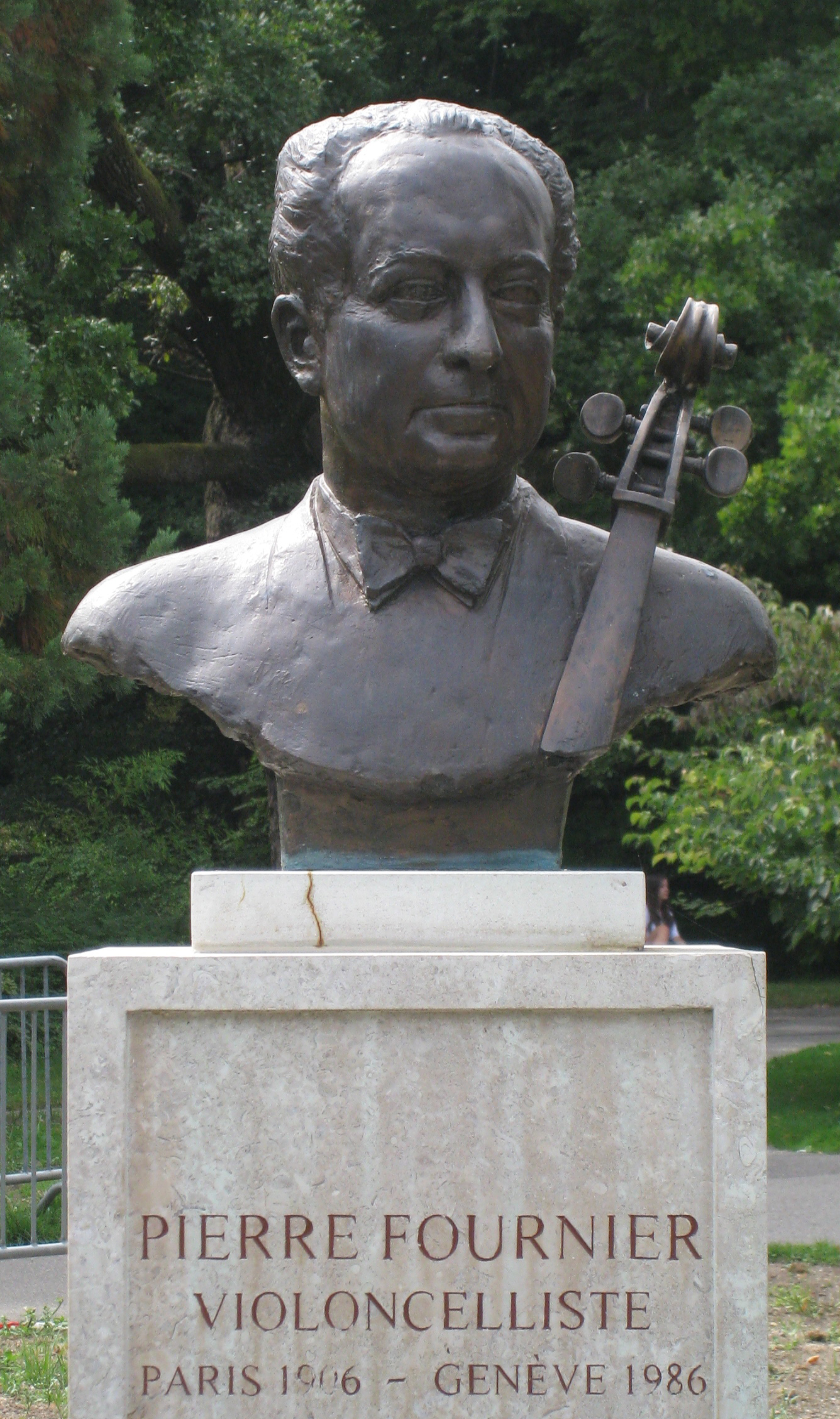
- Pierre Fournier, the dedicatee and cellist of the premiere
- Catalogue: FP 143
- Composed: 1940–1948
- Dedication: Pierre Fournier
- Performed: 18 May 1949: Paris

Francis Poulenc completed his Sonate pour violoncelle et piano (Cello Sonata), FP 143, in 1948. He first sketched it in 1940. It was dedicated to the French cellist Pierre Fournier, who had helped with the technical aspects of the cello part. The work was published by Heugel in Paris.

== Genesis ==
When World War II broke out, general mobilization was decreed in France in August 1939. Poulenc lived then in Noizay and worked on the re-writing of his Sextet and the instrumentation of the Cocardes as well as Fiançailles pour rire. As of 2 June 1940, he was assigned to Bordeaux and composed a few bars during a short stay in Cahors. From 18 July 1940, he was demobilized after the armistice, joined a friend in Brive-la-Gaillarde and sketched the cello sonata as well as L'Histoire de Babar, le petit éléphant and Les Animaux modèles.

After World War II, Poulenc wrote several works including a major one, the Figure humaine cantata and Calligrammes, completed at the end of 1948. He resumed the draft of the cello sonata at the request of its dedicatee Pierre Fournier but he was not inspired to writing for the cello, nor for the violin. His Violin Sonata had been a failure, judged by some critics as weak and mediocre. Fournier helped with technical aspects of the cello part, as the composer was unfamiliar with the instrument. Poulenc finally completed the cello sonata in 1948. It was premiered at salle Gaveau in Paris on 18 May 1949 by Fournier and Poulenc as the pianist.

== Reception and legacy ==
Although the sonata was regarded as "pleasant but no more" ("agréable sans plus"), it was played more than the Violin Sonata. Reviewer Renaud Machart found the Cavatine "severe but beautiful" and the Finale "very successful" but deplored the lack of character of the first movement, while biographer Henri Hell commented that "in spite of a very pretty Cavatine, it has little interest". Adélaïde de Place noted in her entry for Poulenc in the Guide de la musique chambre published by Fayard that the two sonatas were "not among their author's best pages".

== Music ==
Some authors compare the sonata of Poulenc to the style of Vincent d'Indy or Albéric Magnard. Some of his themes recall Les Animaux modèles, a work the composer completed at the time of the sketches of this sonata.

The sonata is in four movements:

1. Allegro – Tempo di Marcia
2. Cavatine
3. Ballabile
4. Finale

Each movement is in ternary form, having a contrasting middle section. The piece makes much use of neo-Baroque and neo-classical styles.

== Selected discography ==
- Pierre Fournier (cello), Jacques Février (piano): Francis Poulenc – Musique de chambre Vol. 1 – EMI
- François Salque (cello), Éric Le Sage (piano) : Francis Poulenc – Intégrale Musique de chambre – RCA Red Seal
- Daniel Müller-Schott (cello), Robert Kulek (piano): Debussy - Poulenc - Franck - Ravel - EMI/Warner
