= Trouard =

Trouard is a French surname. Notable people with the surname include:

- Andy Trouard (born 1994), American runner
- Louis-François Trouard (1729–1804), French architect
- Raymond Trouard (1916–2008), French pianist
