= Ginette Neveu =

French classical violinist (1919–1949)

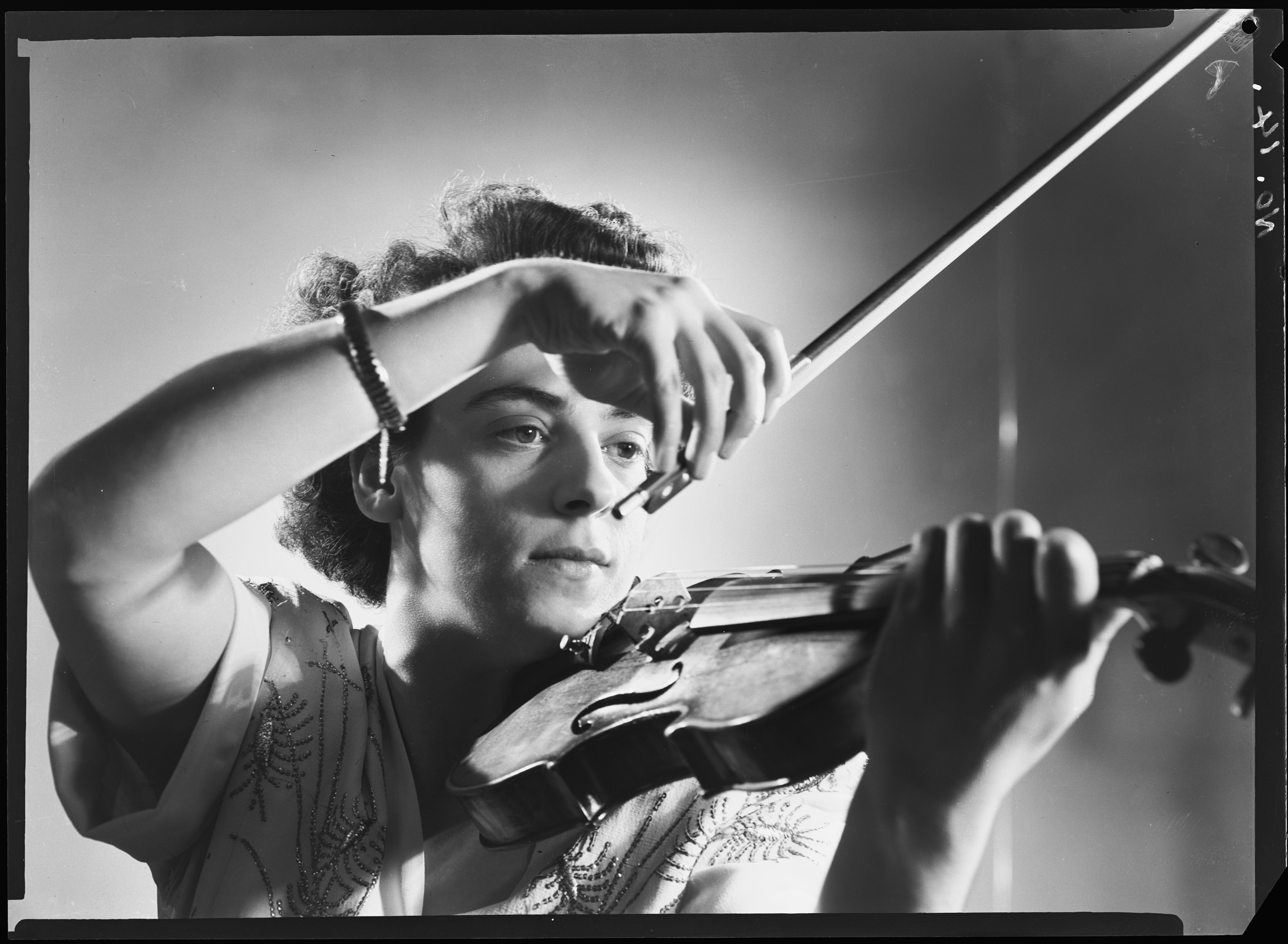
- Ginette Neveu, Sydney, July 1948
- Born: Ginette Neveu; 11 August 1919; Paris, France
- Died: 28 October 1949 (aged 30); São Miguel Island, Azores
- Education: Conservatoire de Paris
- Occupation: Classical violinist

Ginette Neveu (11 August 1919 – 28 October 1949) was a French violinist. At the age of 15, she beat David Oistrakh to win the Polish Henryk Wieniawski Violin Competition. She made several concert tours and was considered to be 'one of the finest violinists of her generation'. Following an interruption to her career during the Second World War she resumed playing concerts more widely and made a small number of recordings. She died in the 1949 Air France Lockheed Constellation crash on São Miguel Island, in the Azores at the age of 30.

== Early life ==
Neveu was born in Paris on 11 August 1919 into a musical family. Neveu's father Maurice Alcide Auguste Neveu was a stockbroker, while her mother, Marie Jeanne Ronze-Neveu, an accomplished violinist, was her first teacher. The composer and organist Charles-Marie Widor was her great-uncle, and her younger brother Jean-Paul became a classical pianist, and her eventual accompanist.

Neveu made her solo debut at the age of seven with Bruch's Violin Concerto No. 1 at the Salle Gaveau in Paris. In the same year she performed Mendelssohn's Violin Concerto in E minor with the Colonne Orchestra under Gabriel Pierné. Her parents then decided to send her to study under Line Talluel. Aged nine, she won first prize at the École Supérieure de Musique and the City of Paris Prix d'Honneur. After further studies with Jules Boucherit at the Conservatoire de Paris, she completed her training with instruction from George Enescu (who had been Yehudi Menuhin's teacher), Nadia Boulanger and Carl Flesch. Flesch offered to teach her without charge after hearing her in the Vienna International Violin Competition, at which, aged 12, she was placed fourth out of 250 entrants. The Vienna Neues Tageblatt wrote, "If you close your eyes, you think you are listening to the vigorous playing of a man and not that of a little girl in a white frock."

== Career ==
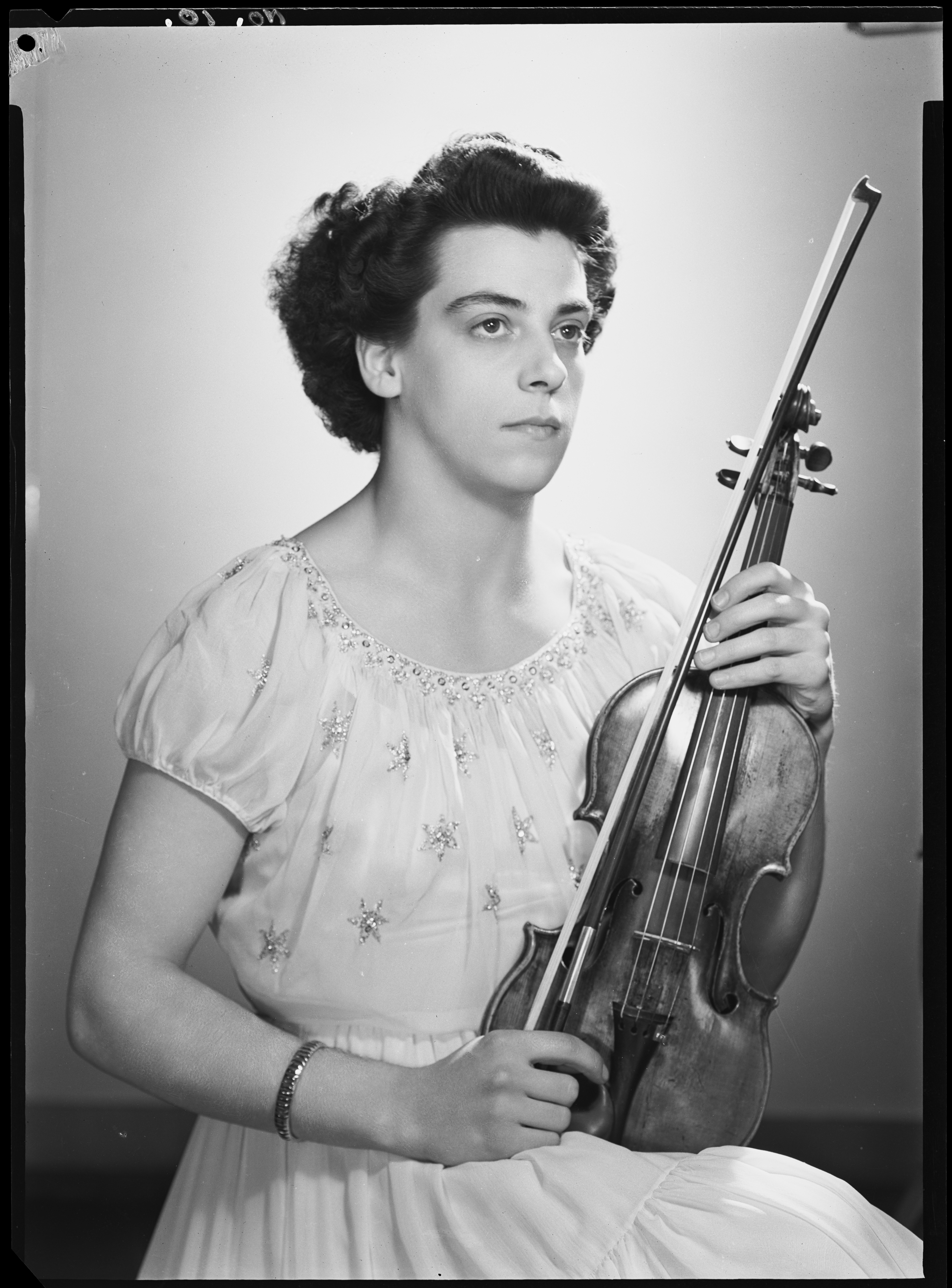
Violinist Ginette Neveu, Sydney, July 1948

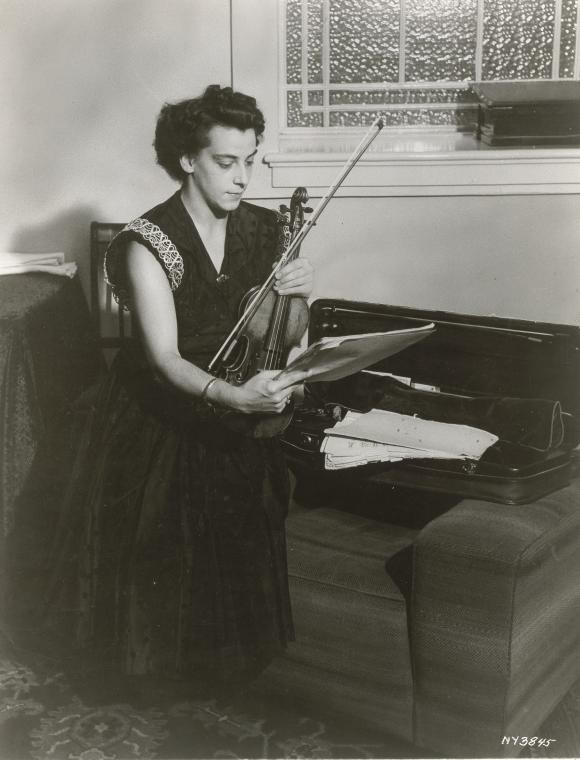
Ginette Neveu ca. 1945

In 1935, aged 15, Neveu achieved worldwide celebrity status when she won the Henryk Wieniawski Violin Competition. Unable to afford the cost of travel to Warsaw, the family was helped by Flesch, who paid for the trip. In the preliminary round (of 180 competitors) Neveu was placed first, 26 points ahead of David Oistrakh, and in the final again she came in first. She was 15, Oistrakh 27 at the time. Henri Temianka was placed third. Neveu was immediately signed to an extensive touring contract which over the next two years saw her give solo performances at the leading concert halls of Germany, Poland, the Soviet Union, the United States and Canada.

Neveu's international career was interrupted by World War II, during which she gave few concerts, nearly all in France. Many invitations to play in Germany were turned down, and she played almost exclusively in small halls in the zone libre. She was finally able to make her London debut in 1946. She recorded Sibelius's Violin Concerto at Abbey Road Studios in the same year.

Her brother Jean-Paul usually accompanied her on piano, and the two toured postwar Europe extensively, appearing at the Prague Spring International Music Festival as well as visiting Australia and South America. They also played return engagements at major venues in the United States. At one concert in the Royal Albert Hall, Queen Elizabeth was so moved by the Beethoven Concerto that she invited Neveu up to the royal box for the second half. 'On the platform,' wrote the critic of the New York newspaper, the World-Telegram, 'Ginette Neveu is an impressive figure – tall, dark, and with an imposing manner. Whenever there is a rest for the violin she stands like an acolyte robed in white, her eyes fixed on the conductor ... it is fascinating.'

Neveu made few commercial recordings, but all of them remain available. She recorded the Brahms and Sibelius Concertos, Ravel's Tzigane, Chausson's Poème, the Debussy Sonata (with her brother) and a handful of shorter pieces. There are also two recordings of her Beethoven Concerto (with Hans Rosbaud and Willem van Otterloo conducting) and two other recordings of her Brahms (with Antal Dorati and Hans Schmidt-Isserstedt) from non-commercial sources. Most highly praised, and most revelatory, was her Sibelius (with the Philharmonia Orchestra and Walter Susskind). Of it, the composer wrote, 'I particularly wish to speak of my feeling of profound gratitude when I think of the inspired and extremely sensitive performance of my Violin Concerto which Ginette Neveu rendered unforgettable.' She loved the Concerto, but, as she said, 'Ils ne le connaissent en France, et ils ne veulent pas le connaitre!' (They don't know it in France, and they don't want to know it!). Perhaps she was thinking of that difficult concerto when she wrote, 'As far as I am concerned, the truly technical problems which are the most disconcerting and the most fruitful are those posed by composers who have a strong personality and pursue the essence of their musical idea to its logical conclusion without wasting too much sympathy on the performer.'

== Plane crash and death ==
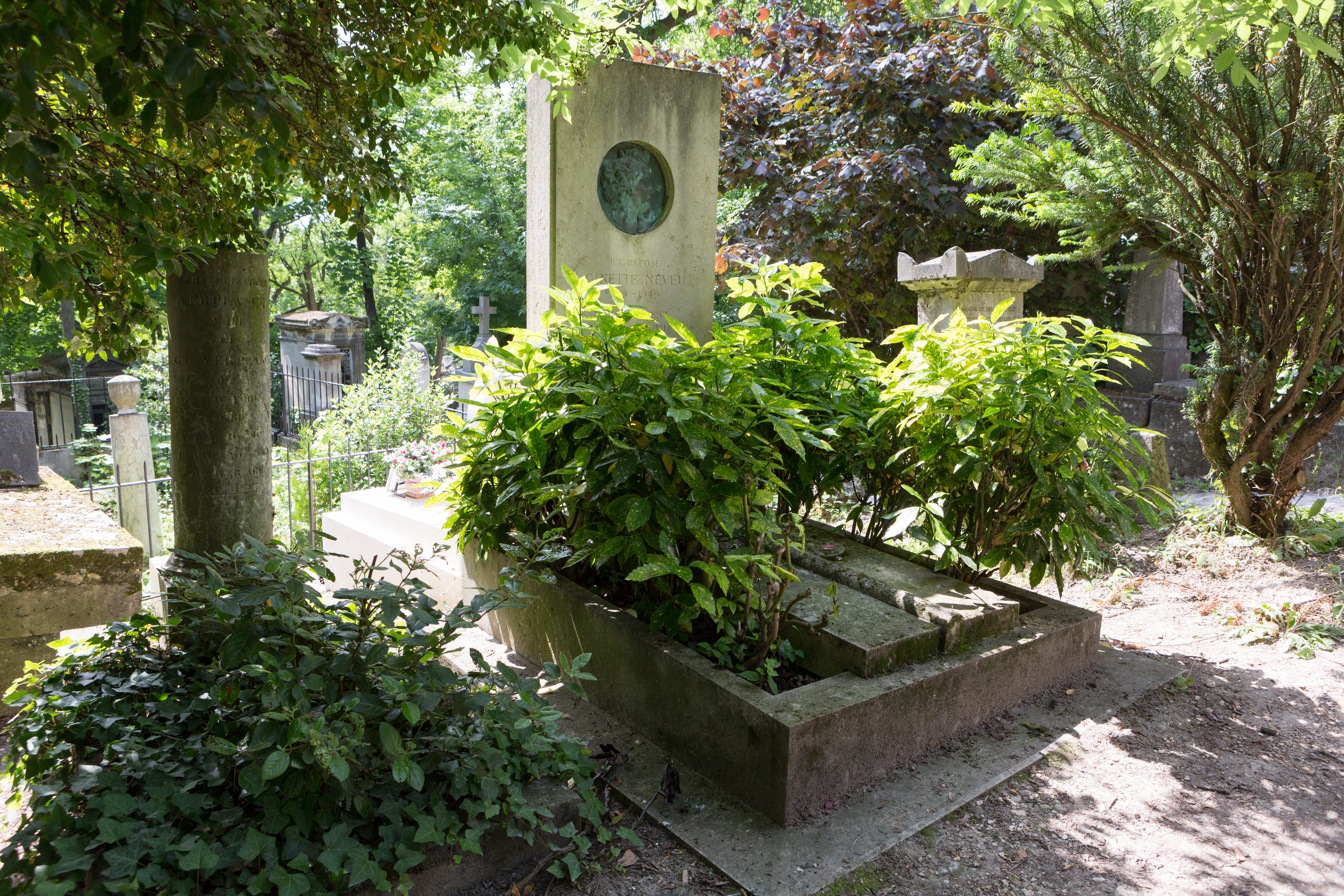
Neveu's grave at the Père Lachaise Cemetery, Paris.

Neveu gave her last concert in Paris on 20 October 1949. On 28 October, she was on board an Air France flight from Paris to New York when it crashed on a mountain after two failed attempts to make a landing at the Santa Maria Airport in the Azores. All 48 people on board the flight died, including Ginette, her brother Jean-Paul Neveu, and the French former boxing champion Marcel Cerdan. Her violin, made by Omobono Stradivari in 1730, was also lost.

During the return of the bodies to France, Neveu's coffin was confused with that of another victim, Amélie Ringler, whose funeral took place before the error was discovered. On 28 November, Neveu's brother-in-law identified her remains in the coffin disinterred from the graveyard in Bantzenheim. Neveu now lies in Père Lachaise Cemetery in Paris, close to the grave of Frédéric Chopin.

== Legacy ==
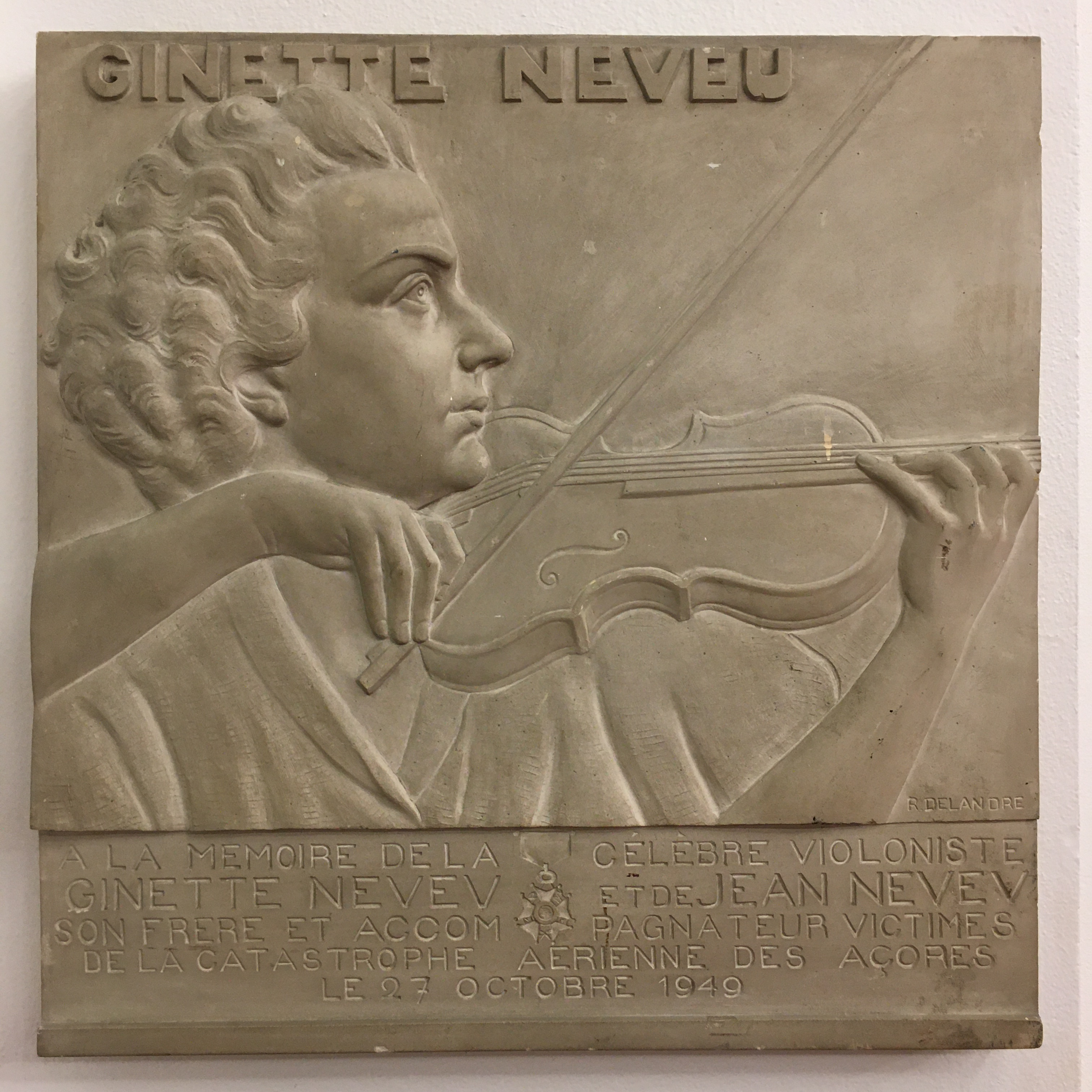
Plaque in honour of Neveu at the Salle Pleyel.

After Neveu's death, tributes poured in. Queen Elisabeth of Belgium visited the grieving family, who had lost a son and a daughter. The composer Francis Poulenc, whose Violin Sonata Neveu had premiered (and parts of which she had contributed), wrote, 'I am haunted by the memory of Ginette Neveu. I had the greatest admiration for her and I loved her dearly.' For Pablo Casals, 'Her playing was one of the greatest revelations, both instrumental and musical.' Charles Munch, newly installed conductor of the Boston Symphony Orchestra, who had often worked with her, wrote 'Dear Ginette, the memory of you will never cease to haunt us, and each time that by the grace of God we are able to make music really well, we shall feel you very close to us.' Jacques Thibaud, the great French violinist (who would himself die in a plane crash shortly afterward), wrote, 'Why was it that at the dawn of her days an unjust and relentless stroke of fate should come and cut off a life which was bringing to the world nothing but beauty and joy? But in spite of the sternness of destiny, in the hearts of her friends and of the whole world Ginette is unforgettable. The memory of her will never die.'

Neveu was posthumously awarded the Cross of the Legion d'Honneur. A street is named in her memory in the Montmartre region of Paris.
