= Born Yesterday (1950 film) =

1950 film by George Cukor

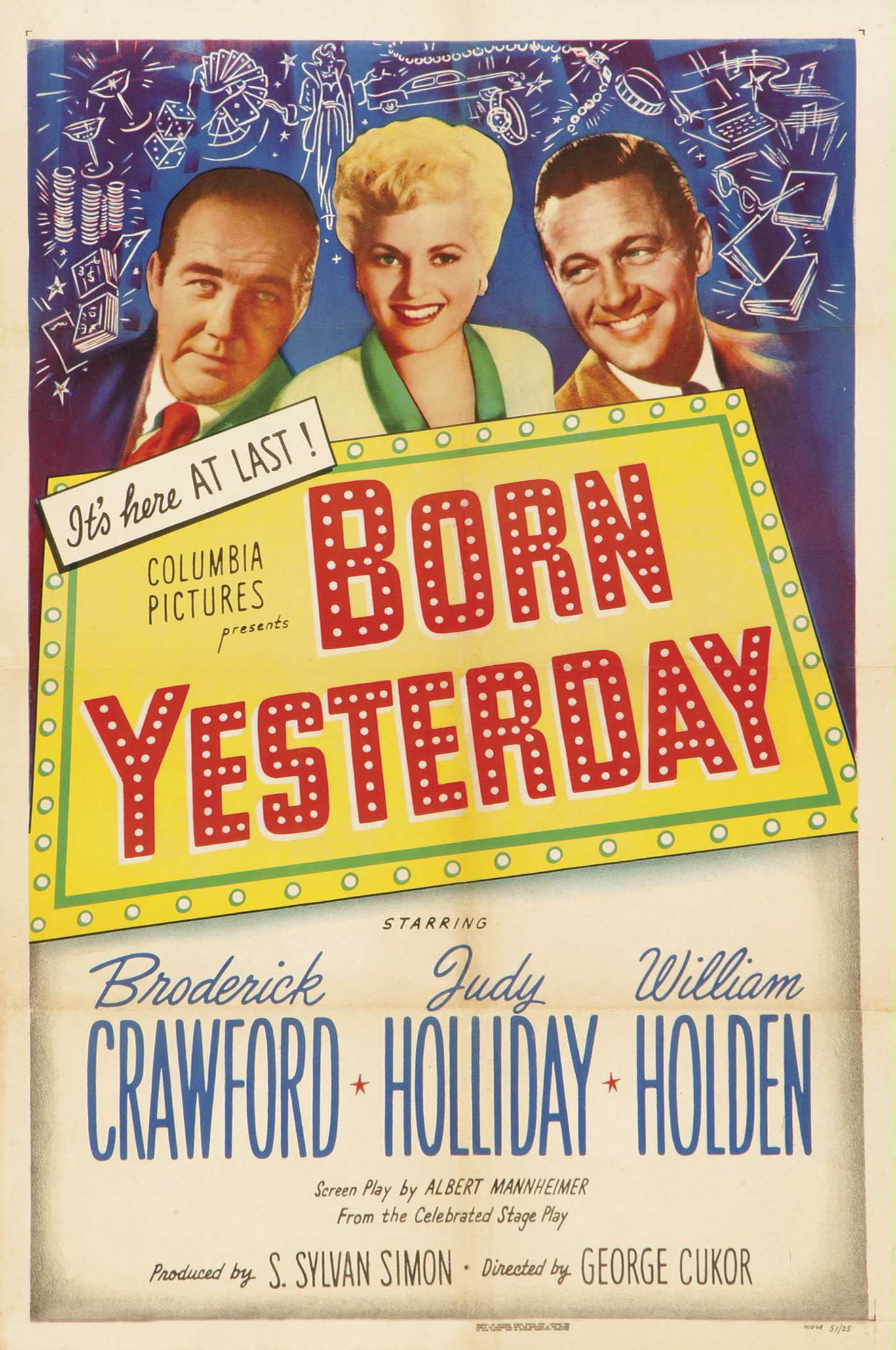
- Theatrical release poster
- Directed by: George Cukor
- Screenplay by: Albert Mannheimer; Garson Kanin (uncredited)
- Based on: Born Yesterday by Garson Kanin
- Produced by: S. Sylvan Simon
- Starring: Judy Holliday; Broderick Crawford; William Holden
- Cinematography: Joseph Walker
- Edited by: Charles Nelson
- Music by: Frederick Hollander
- Production company: Columbia Pictures
- Distributed by: Columbia Pictures
- Release date: December 25, 1950
- Running time: 102 minutes
- Country: United States
- Language: English
- Box office: $4.15 million (US and Canada rentals)

Born Yesterday is a 1950 American romantic comedy-drama film directed by George Cukor, based on the 1946 stage play of the same name by Garson Kanin. The screenplay was credited to Albert Mannheimer. According to Kanin's autobiography, Cukor did not like Mannheimer's work, believing it lacked much of the play's value, so he approached Kanin about adapting a screenplay from his own play. Because of legal entanglements, Kanin did not receive screen credit.

The film tells the story of an uneducated young woman, Billie Dawn (played by Judy Holliday, in an Oscar-winning performance), and an uncouth, older, wealthy junkyard tycoon, Harry Brock (Broderick Crawford) who comes to Washington, D.C., to try to "buy" a congressman. When Billie embarrasses him socially, Harry hires journalist Paul Verrall (William Holden) to educate her. In the process, Billie learns how corrupt Harry is, and eventually falls in love with Paul.

The film was produced and released by Columbia Pictures. Kanin frequently stated that Harry Brock was modeled on Columbia production chief Harry Cohn, with whom Kanin had a long and testy relationship. According to Cohn biographer Bob Thomas, Cohn knew of Kanin's attribution but didn't care about it. In 2012, Born Yesterday was deemed "culturally, historically, or aesthetically significant" by the United States Library of Congress and selected for preservation in the National Film Registry.

== Plot ==
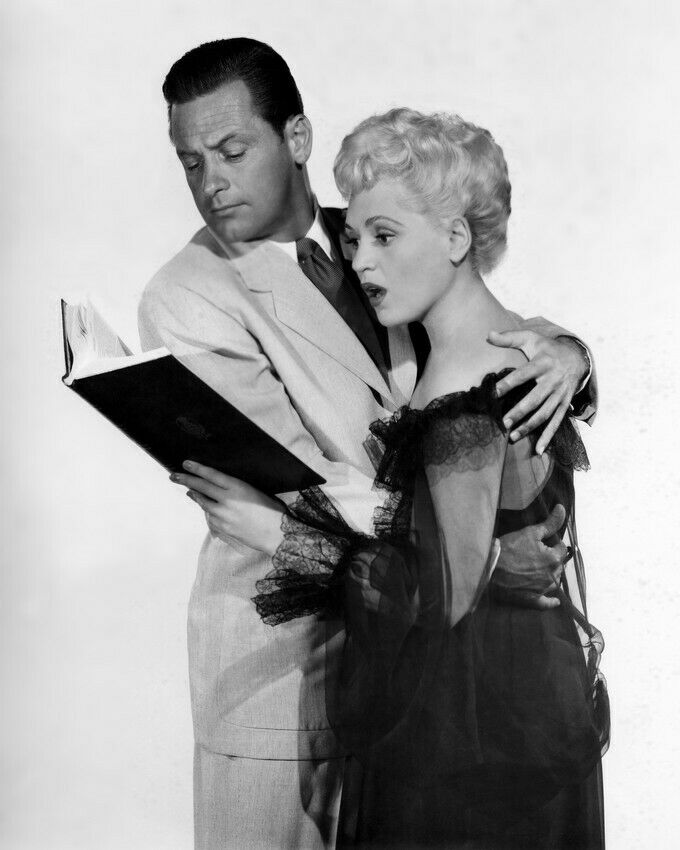
William Holden and Judy Holliday in a promotional still for Born Yesterday

Bullying, uncouth junkyard tycoon Harry Brock checks into a hotel suite in Washington, D.C., with his brassy girlfriend, former showgirl Emma "Billie" Dawn, and his crooked lawyer, Jim Devery, to "influence" a politician or two. As a legal precaution, Devery presses Harry to marry Billie, as a wife cannot be forced to testify against her husband. To hide and safeguard Harry's assets from the government, Devery persuades Harry to sign over many of his assets to the reliably docile and unquestionably obedient Billie.

With aspirations to become a power broker among D.C. dignitaries, Harry likes to exert dominance over political figures he pays off, sometimes humiliating them when they are not sufficiently compliant. Though his own behavior is much worse, Harry is embarrassed by Billie's oblivious behavior with a prominent congressman's wife, disgusted with Billie's ignorance and lack of manners, which he believes reflect badly on him. When journalist Paul Verrall comes to interview him, Harry is impressed by his unintimidated and spirited demeanor. Offering Paul a hefty fee as a way of exerting dominance over a better-educated but underpaid member of the Fourth Estate, Harry hires Paul to educate Billie and give her some culture.

Paul soon finds that Billie has a limited vocabulary and is completely uninterested in areas of common knowledge outside of her sphere. Attracted to Paul, Billie suggests they have a fling, reassuring him that Harry has always remained unaware because he does not pay attention to anything outside of his business interests. Paul demurs politely but shows Billie respect and patience, using her attraction to him to stimulate her interest in world affairs. Starting with reading the daily newspaper, Paul encourages Billie to circle items she does not understand. Initially, Billie circles every article she attempts to read and complains that she has to look up nearly every word. They discuss the related issues and vocabulary. Blossoming under Paul's encouragement and her own hard work, Billie learns about literature, history, politics and the law; she turns out to be much smarter than she or anyone else knew.

Billie starts thinking for herself and applying her learning to her situation. She also falls in love with Paul, who begins to appreciate her intellectual development and reciprocate her feelings. When Billie begins to read the documents that Harry has her sign for businesses under her name, she disapproves of a crooked deal and refuses to sign. Harry reacts violently, striking her and forcing her to sign the contracts related to his crooked deal. After consulting a dictionary during the heat of the argument, Billie calls him a "fascist"; missing the mark, the increasingly out-of-his-depth Harry counters that he does not belong to any organized religion. Tension grows in Billie and Harry's relationship as he deals with her newfound inquisitiveness and independence. Growing wary, Harry tries to intimidate her into signing his assets back to him.

With Paul's help, gathering evidence against Harry in a safe place as a precaution, Billie uses her leverage to escape from Harry's domination. She promises to give Harry back his property little by little as long as he "behaves" in his business dealings and leaves them alone.

Later, when Paul and Billie are driving out of D.C., they are stopped for speeding by a traffic policeman who asks Paul for his "license"; Paul hands over their marriage license and the sympathetic officer lets them go. When Billie comments that their marriage was "predestination", the officer says that he does not know what that means, and Billie—the advocate for expanding vocabulary—responds, "Look it up."

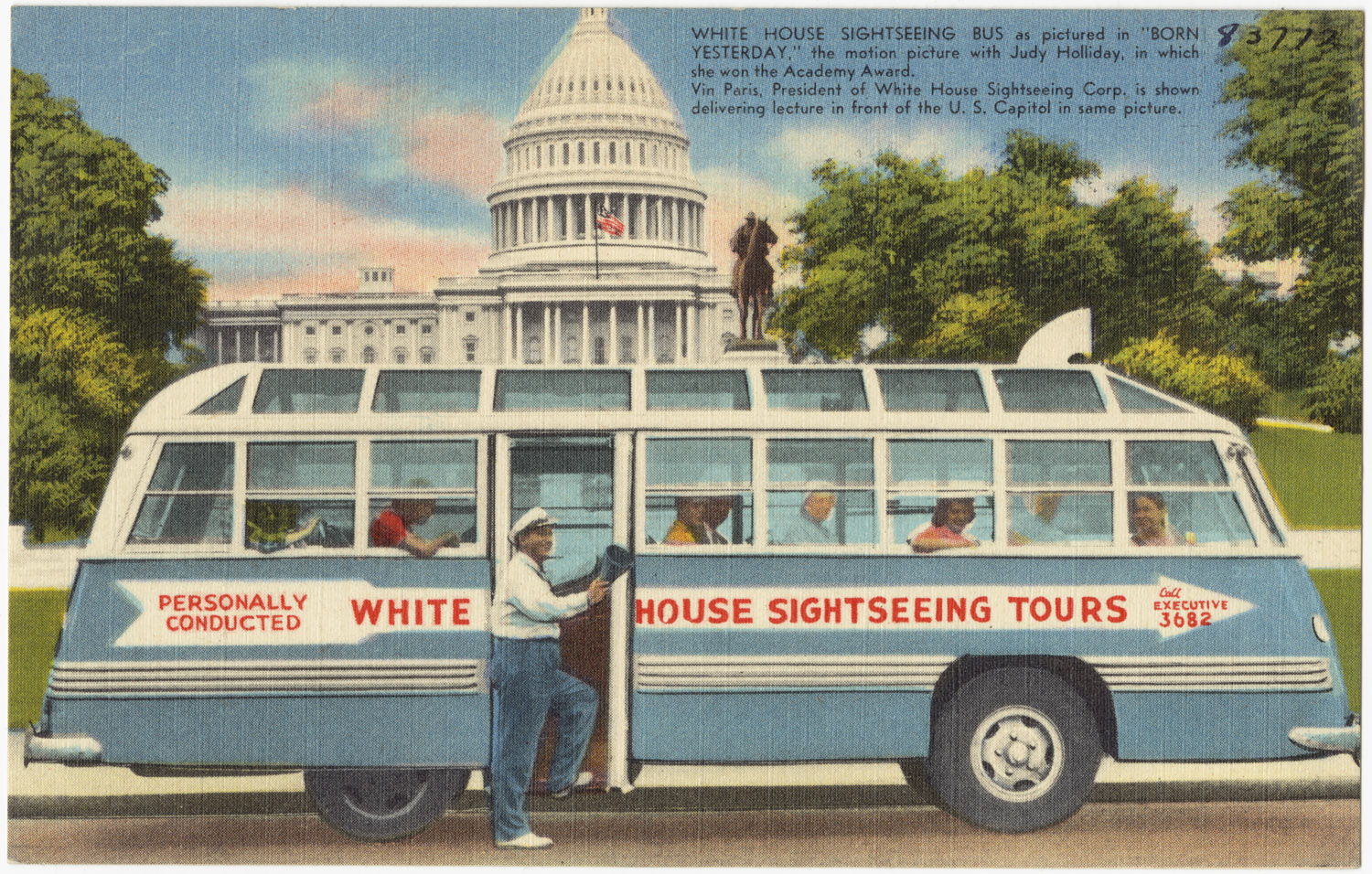
White House Sightseeing bus as pictured in the film.

== Cast ==
- Judy Holliday as Billie Dawn
- Broderick Crawford as Harry Brock
- William Holden as Paul Verrall
- Howard St. John as Jim Devery
- Frank Otto as Eddie, Harry's servant
- Larry Oliver as Congressman Norval Hedges
- Barbara Brown as Mrs. Anna Hedges
- Grandon Rhodes as Sanborn, hotel manager
- Claire Carleton as Helen, the maid

== Production ==
=== Pre-production ===
Though all the major Hollywood studios wanted to film Garson Kanin's Broadway play Born Yesterday, Columbia Studios purchased the rights for $750,000 plus a percentage of the profits in 1947, the second most paid for screen rights to a play at the time behind the $1 million paid for Harvey. However, the project was put on the shelf for months because of casting problems. In April 1950, Columbia head Harry Cohn assigned George Cukor to direct the film, though Cukor was not the studio's first choice.

Cukor's preparatory work for Born Yesterday was quite innovative. The actors rehearsed the screenplay for two weeks, then performed it before an audience drawn from studio employees. Cukor's idea was to give the actors a chance to develop "dimensional characters", and clock laugh values from audience reaction before the cameras began rolling. Cukor held that if a scene is funny, there is no need to play about with it. When people complained, "that laugh overrode the line, I did not hear the next line," Cukor's answer remained the same, "Go and see the movie again." But he did make some changes—when the laughter was long and loud, he added some visual detail.

=== Casting ===
According to a Hollywood Reporter news item, Holliday initially refused to reprise her popular Broadway role for the film. In September 1947, Rita Hayworth was reported to be in line for the role, but in late April 1949, it was reported that Gloria Grahame was to be borrowed from RKO for the lead, and that Jean Arthur and Lana Turner had also been considered for the part. An October 16, 1947, Hollywood Reporter news item stated that Columbia was negotiating with Paul Douglas to reprise his Broadway role.

According to modern sources, Kanin convinced Cohn to cast Holliday by co-writing—with wife Ruth Gordon—a part specifically for her in the 1949 MGM film Adam's Rib. Holliday's performance in the film garnered her critical acclaim and convinced Cohn of her comedic abilities. Larry Oliver and Frank Otto also reprised their Broadway roles. A September 20, 1950, article in the Los Angeles Daily News reported that before filming began, the cast perfected their comic timing during six performances in front of live audiences of studio employees.

=== Costumes ===
In the stage production, Holliday's character Billie Dawn wore only five costumes, but in the film, costume designer Jean Louis designed thirteen elaborate creations. Cukor asked Louis to "characterize" the clothes, with obviously expensive and ornate clothes at the beginning, when Billie is ignorant and self-centered. However, as she acquires culture, her wardrobe becomes simpler and more elegant.

=== Locations ===
To increase the film's authenticity, Cukor went to Washington, D.C., for locations, and the city became a dramatic personage in the story. Six named Washington, D.C., locations (Jefferson Memorial, Library of Congress, National Gallery of Art, Statler Hotel, United States Capitol and the Watergate Steps, where Dawn and Verrall attend a then-regular outdoor summer concert of the National Symphony Orchestra) were included in the shoot. Observing tourists at the Lincoln Memorial, Cukor noticed that sightseers would chew gum and give works of art a cursory glance, if any at all. But in Hollywood movies, sightseers invariably were shown standing in rapt attention. Avoiding these cliches, Cukor considered the outdoor scenes among his best efforts.

== Release ==
The Hollywood premiere of Born Yesterday was attended by many celebrities and the film was met with enthusiastic applause. Jan Sterling and Paul Douglas, who had played the two leading roles on stage, attended the premiere.

== Reception ==
=== Critical response ===
In a review published the day after the film's premiere, Bosley Crowther of The New York Times wrote, "Just in time to make itself evident as one of the best pictures of this fading year is Columbia's trenchant screen version of the stage play, Born Yesterday ... On the strength of this one appearance, there is no doubt that Miss Holliday will leap into popularity as a leading American movie star." Variety stated, "Columbia has a promising box-office offering in its screen version of the Broadway hit play, Born Yesterday. The bright, biting comedy of the Garson Kanin legit piece adapts easily to film and there is every indication that key-city audiences will give it a hearty ticket play." Richard L. Coe of The Washington Post called it "an even more beguiling comedy than it was on the stage, and Judy Holliday's even funnier ... It's one of the few I'd like to see twice." A review in Harrison's Reports declared, "An excellent adult comedy ... What really puts the picture over is the brilliant performance of Judy Holliday as the beautiful but dizzy 'girl-friend' of an unscrupulous, uncouth multi-millionaire junk dealer, whose downfall is brought about when he makes the mistake of deciding that she needs an education. One has to see and hear Miss Holliday to fully appreciate the superb delivery of her lines and the fine shadings of her artful mannerisms." The Monthly Film Bulletin stated, "Garson Kanin's comedy is a pleasing lesson in the virtues of democracy, enlivened by smart, sometimes witty, dialogue and by characterisation which, if broad and simple, is always lively."

Pauline Kael praised Judy Holiday's performance saying "you'll remember the early, acquisitive Billie with her truculent voice and glassy eyes..." but said "The second half is pretty dreary like the Garson Kanin hit play that it's based on" and called George Cukor's direction "visually dead."

Syndicated Catholic columnist William H. Mooring decried the film as "clever film satire strictly from [Karl] Marx." In 1951, the film was picketed by the Anti-Communist Committee of the Catholic War Veterans because Holliday and Kanin were affiliated with organizations on the U.S. attorney general's list of subversive groups.

Supporters of the film included columnist Louella Parsons, reviewer William R. Weaver of the Motion Picture Herald and Kenneth Clark of the MPAA, who stated "we feel very deeply and sincerely the picture gives warmth and positive support to the democratic ideals, principles and institutions of America."

On the review aggregator website Rotten Tomatoes, 95% of 82 critics' reviews are positive. The website's consensus reads: "Marrying screwball romance with political satire, Born Yesterday is a substantive romp with a ferociously smart performance by Judy Holliday as an uncouth bombshell."

=== Accolades ===
In late 1950, many critics predicted that the Academy Award for Best Actress would be given to Gloria Swanson for Sunset Boulevard or Bette Davis for All About Eve and were surprised that the recipient was newcomer Judy Holliday for this film. Davis believed that her and Swanson's comparable characters effectively "cancelled each other out", allowing Holliday to win, a theory also invoked to explain Marisa Tomei's "dark horse" Best Supporting Actress win over Miranda Richardson and Vanessa Redgrave for the 1992 Joe Pesci vehicle My Cousin Vinny. Swanson recalled the press's reaction following Holliday's win: "It slowly dawned on me that they were unconsciously asking for a larger-than-life scene, or better still, a mad scene. More accurately, they were trying to flush out Norma Desmond."

Award	Category	Recipient(s)	Result	Ref.
Academy Awards	Best Motion Picture	Columbia Pictures	Nominated	
Academy Awards	Best Director	George Cukor	Nominated	
Academy Awards	Best Actress	Judy Holliday	Won	
Academy Awards	Best Screenplay	Albert Mannheimer	Nominated	
Academy Awards	Best Costume Design – Black and White	Jean Louis	Nominated	
Golden Globe Awards	Best Motion Picture – Drama	Born Yesterday	Nominated	
Golden Globe Awards	Best Actress in a Motion Picture – Drama	Judy Holliday	Nominated	
Golden Globe Awards	Best Actress in a Motion Picture – Musical or Comedy	Judy Holliday	Won	
Golden Globe Awards	Best Director – Motion Picture	George Cukor	Nominated	
Jussi Awards	Best Foreign Actress	Judy Holliday	Won	
National Film Preservation Board	National Film Registry	Born Yesterday	Inducted	
New York Film Critics Circle Awards	Best Actress	Judy Holliday	Nominated	
Venice International Film Festival	Golden Lion	George Cukor	Nominated	
Writers Guild of America Awards	Best Written American Comedy	Albert Mannheimer	Nominated	

The British film magazine Picturegoer awarded the film its Seal of Merit, but warned its readers that Holliday's character is "from New York's East Side, and speaks in a baby Bronx voice that is like the tinkling of many tiny, tuneless cymbals." The magazine admired Holliday's performance and spoke of her in the same breath as Carole Lombard.

The film is recognized by American Film Institute in the following list:

- 2000: AFI's 100 Years... 100 Laughs – No. 24

=== Censorship ===
Although the film was clearly written for a mature audience, Kanin and Cukor were forced to amend the film to appease censors. Cukor explained, "It seems ludicrous now, but twenty years ago you couldn't have a character say, 'I love that broad,' you couldn't even say 'broad.' And the nonsense that went on to get over the fact that Judy Holliday and Broderick Crawford lived together! It required the greatest skill and some new business that Garson invented, like Billie Dawn always creeping into the apartment the back way. We managed to keep it amusing, I think, but it was so unnecessary."

However, the censors thought the scrutiny was necessary, and Cukor was urged to use caution when filming Holliday's dresses. At that time, it was mandatory for intimate body areas, especially breasts, to be completely covered. The censors also requested that Cukor avoid any suggestion that Billie was trying to get Paul into bed. Billie's line "Are you one of those talkers, or would you be interested in a little action?" was deemed offensive. However, Cukor stood his ground, and the line made it into the final cut.

== Remake ==
Throughout the 1970s and '80s, Kanin reportedly pursued plans for an updated remake, possibly starring Bette Midler, Barbra Streisand or Whoopi Goldberg, as well as a musical version that might star Bernadette Peters or Dolly Parton, with Frank Sinatra as Harry Brock, but neither of these projects came to fruition. The remake was finally made in 1993, directed by Luis Mandoki and starring Melanie Griffith, Don Johnson and John Goodman.
