= Air France Flight 009 =

1949 aviation accident

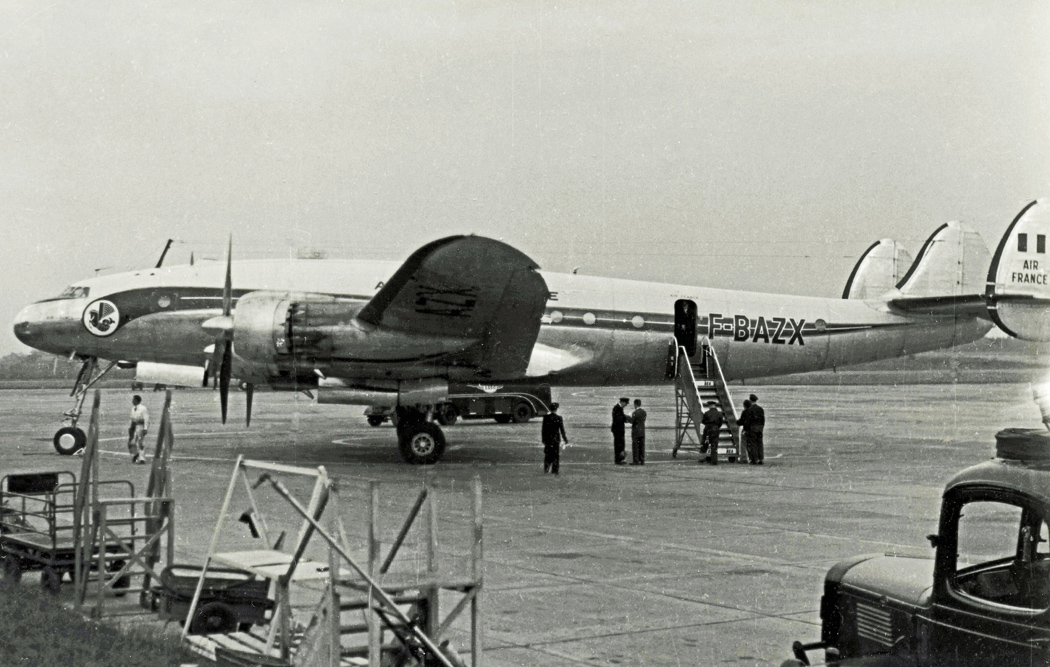
- A Lockheed Constellation of Air France similar to the accident aircraft

Accident
- Date: 28 October 1949
- Summary: Controlled flight into terrain due to pilot error
- Site: Pico da Vara, São Miguel Island, Azores

Aircraft
- Aircraft type: Lockheed L-749-79-46 Constellation
- Operator: Air France
- Registration: F-BAZN
- Flight origin: Paris-Orly Airport, France
- Stopover: Santa Maria Airport, Azores, Portugal
- Destination: New York City, United States
- Occupants: 48
- Passengers: 37
- Crew: 11
- Fatalities: 48
- Survivors: 0

Air France Flight 009 was a scheduled international flight that crashed into a mountain while attempting to land at Santa Maria Airport, Azores, on 28 October 1949, on a stopover during a scheduled international passenger flight from Paris-Orly Airport to New York City. All 48 people on board were killed.

== Accident ==
The aircraft was operating a scheduled international passenger flight from Paris-Orly Airport, France to New York City, with a stopover at Santa Maria Airport, Azores. There were 11 crew and 37 passengers on board. The flight departed from Orly at 20:05 on 27 October. (Note: Times quoted in this article are local time, per sources used. Paris times are thus Central European Time (CET). Azores times are Greenwich Mean Time, which is one hour behind CET.)

At 02:51 on 28 October, the pilot reported he was at a height of 3,000 feet (910 m) and had the airport in sight. After no further communications were received from the aircraft, a search was initiated, involving eight aircraft and several ships. The aircraft was found to have crashed into a ridge between Pico da Vara and Pico Redondo on São Miguel Island, 60 miles (97 km) from the airport. All 48 people on board were killed in the crash and subsequent fire. The wreckage was spread over an area of 30,000 square metres (36,000 square yards). The bodies of the victims were recovered and initially taken to the church in Algarvia before they were repatriated. At the time, the accident was the deadliest to have occurred in Portugal and also the deadliest involving the Lockheed Constellation. A memorial to the victims was erected on Pico da Vara at 37°48′N 25°12′W.

== Aircraft ==
The aircraft involved was a Lockheed L-749A-79-46 Constellation F-BAZN, msn 2546, built in 1947.

== Investigation ==
The accident was investigated by the French government's Bureau d'Enquêtes et d'Analyses pour la Sécurité de l'Aviation Civile. The investigation found that the cause of the accident was controlled flight into terrain due to inadequate navigation by the pilot whilst operating under VFR conditions. It was found that the pilot had sent inaccurate position reports and that he had failed to identify the airport.

== Victims ==
Among the victims were French former middleweight boxing world champion Marcel Cerdan, who was on his way to New York to meet French singer Edith Piaf, with whom he was having an affair. Other victims included French violinist Ginette Neveu, artist Bernard Boutet de Monvel, and American Walt Disney Company merchandising executive Kay Kamen. Neveu's Stradivarius violin was destroyed.
