= Victor Staub =

French pianist and composer (1872–1953)

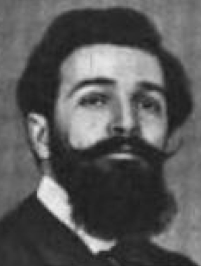
Victor Staub, c. 1900

Victor (Henri) Staub (16 October 1872 – 4 February 1953) was a French pianist and composer.

== Life ==
Born in Lima, Peru, to Swiss-French parents, Staub exhibited an early aptitude for the piano. He studied at the Paris Conservatoire with Antoine Marmontel and Louis Diémer, gaining a first prize in piano in 1888.

Staub competed in the Anton Rubinstein prize in Berlin in 1895. He and Josef Lhévinne both played Beethoven's Hammerklavier Sonata, Op. 106. In the first round of voting, Staub and Lhévinne obtained the same number of votes, but Lhévinne was ultimately awarded the 5,000 franc first prize after a second round of voting.

Staub taught for five years at the Cologne conservatory. He left Cologne in 1902 and returned to Paris.

He became a professor at the Paris Conservatoire on 21 October 1909, in succession to Edouard Risler. Upon the death of Elie Delaborde in 1914, Gabriel Fauré chose Staub over Marguerite Long to head the Classe Supérieure for women. Staub's female pupils included Germaine Devèze, Madeleine Giraudeau, Jacqueline Pangnier (Robin), Hélène Pignari, and Rita Savard. He also taught José Iturbi, Ernest Hoffzimmer, and Raymond Trouard. Staub retired from the Conservatoire on 15 January 1941 and was succeeded by Armand Ferté.

Victor Staub recorded Chopin's Waltz in F, Op. 34, No. 3; Debussy's Ménéstrels; and Schumann's Des Abends.

He composed numerous piano pieces, including most notably "Sous bois" (1902) and "Boléro" (1924), as well as his piano arrangement of the Sorcerer's Apprentice by Paul Dukas. He also authored pedagogical works.

Raymond Trouard recalled that:

Staub could play like no one else. One morning (I had come in a little early), I saw him arrive calmly, sit down at the keyboard and perform, for himself, without any warning, Liszt's "Feux-Follets" impeccably! Staub had memorized the Etudes Transcendantes, Chopin's op. 10 and 25 Etudes, as well as most of the difficult works of the repertoire. Only a handful of pianists could boast of being able to do the same."

== Personal life ==
The son of Henri Staub (Zurich 1845 - Paris 1906) and Isabelle Merey (1847–1907), Victor Staub had three sisters: Emma, Béatrice, and Mercedes. His marriage to Blanche Marie de Orelly (1882–1906) produced no children, but with his second wife Marie Marguerite Emilie Baneux (1882–1958) he had a daughter, Odette Blanche Staub (the pianist Diana Staub, 1908–2000). Odette was the mother of actor Jean Claudio.

Victor Staub lived at 27 rue Fourcroy, in Paris, where he also gave private lessons for "professionals, amateurs, and children". He died in Paris.

== Works ==
Solo piano

Opus	Title	Year
6	Sous bois	1902
11	Aubade - impromptu	1907
13	Gaiement	1908
15	Scintillements - arabesque	1908
18	En Valsant - Valse Mignonne	
22	Chanson gaie	1909
27	Pasquinade	1912
28	Sérénade Italienne	1911
29	La ronde des follets	
38	Sérénade espagnole	
40	Rêverie	
44	Sérénade française	
46	Humoresque	1912
	Les deux compères	1905
	Les matines	1919
	Boléro	1924
	Les chasseurs	1930
	Pantomime	1930
	Bab-el-oued	
	Chanson arabe	
	Conchita	
	Danse napolitaine	
	Le chant du muletier	
	Les jongleurs	
	Li-o-ting	
	Mazurka	
	Paysage ensoleillé	
	Pepita - pièce espagnole - boléro	
	Rêverie hindoue	
	Saboulah - pièce orientale	
	Sérénade valse	
	Simple conte	
50	Tango	191?
	Valse ballet	
	Valse lente	

Piano 4-hands

- Trois Pièces: En trottinant, Marche; En dansant, Valse; En chantant, Sérénade (1909)

Opérette

- Les Quatre fils Aymon, one act (performed at the Cercle des Joyeux, 19 December 1888)

Chansons

- L'Heure délicieuse (Lucien Marotte), 1910
- L'Heure silencieuse (Lucien Marotte), 1910
