= Three Daring Daughters =

1948 film by Fred M. Wilcox

- VHS cover
- Directed by: Fred M. Wilcox
- Written by: Albert Mannheimer; Frederick Kohner; Sonya Levien; John Meehan
- Produced by: Joe Pasternak
- Starring: Jeanette MacDonald; José Iturbi; Jane Powell; Edward Arnold; Harry Davenport
- Cinematography: Ray June
- Edited by: Adrienne Fazan
- Music by: Herbert Stothart; Lothar Perl
- Production company: Metro-Goldwyn-Mayer
- Distributed by: Loew's Inc.
- Release date: March 5, 1948
- Running time: 115 minutes
- Country: United States
- Language: English
- Budget: $2,538,000
- Box office: $2,659,000 (Domestic earnings) $1,351,000 (Foreign earnings)

Three Daring Daughters (UK title: The Birds and the Bees) is a 1948 American Technicolor musical film directed by Fred M. Wilcox and starring Jeanette MacDonald, Jane Powell and Edward Arnold. It was produced and released by Metro-Goldwyn-Mayer. The screenplay was written by Albert Mannheimer, Frederick Kohner, Sonya Levien and John Meehan.

== Plot ==
It's Tess's graduation day from Miss Drake's School for Girls. During the choir's performance at the ceremony, Tess notices that her beautiful divorcée mother, Louise Rayton Morgan, isn't there. Louise, an editor for Modern Design magazine, is in Dr. Cannon's office after fainting due to being overworked and stressed.

At home after the graduation ceremony, Dr. Cannon has a talk with Louise's three daughters, Tess, Ilka and Alix. He tells them that their mother needs a vacation badly, but the only way she can relax is if she goes without the girls. Louise is reluctant, but the girls convince her to go. They see their mother off on a one-month Cuban cruise. The girls then discuss whether they could bring their father back home and make their mom happy and healthy again.

In reality, Louise has kept the truth about their father from them. He was actually a very uncaring man, who left Louise to raise the girls on her own. They go to see their father's boss, Robert Nelson, to locate their father. Meanwhile, on Louise's cruise, she meets famed pianist and conductor José Iturbi. José is immediately taken by Louise, but she plays hard to get, while having the time of her life. When Louise finally returns home, she has a secret to tell the girls.

== Cast ==
- Jeanette MacDonald as Louise Rayton Morgan
- José Iturbi as Himself
- Jane Powell as Tess Morgan
- Edward Arnold as Robert Nelson
- Harry Davenport as Dr. Cannon
- Moyna Macgill as Mrs. Smith
- Elinor Donahue as Alix Morgan
- Ann E. Todd as Ilka Morgan
- Tom Helmore as Michael Pemberton
- Kathryn Card as Jonesy
- Dick Simmons as Mr. Hollow, Nelson's Secretary
- Larry Adler as himself (Harmonica Player)
- Amparo Iturbi as herself

== Reception ==
The film earned $4,010,000 at the box office.
