= Ayn Rand and the World She Made =

2009 biography

- First edition cover
- Author: Anne Conover Heller
- Language: English
- Subject: Ayn Rand
- Publisher: Nan A. Talese
- Publication date: 2009
- Publication place: United States
- Media type: Print
- Pages: 567 (first edition)
- ISBN: 978-0-385-51399-9
- OCLC: 229027437

Ayn Rand and the World She Made is a 2009 biography of Russian-American philosopher Ayn Rand by Anne C. Heller.

== Background ==
Heller was a journalist who first heard of Rand while working as a magazine editor. Writer Suze Orman gave Heller a copy of an excerpt from Rand's novel Atlas Shrugged in which a character explains Rand's views on money. Heller's interest was piqued by Rand's unusual viewpoint, and she subsequently read extensively from Rand's other writings.

As research for the book, Heller interviewed a number of Rand's former associates and listened to unreleased recordings of interviews conducted by others. They included extensive interviews that Barbara Branden conducted with Rand in the 1960s as preparation for Branden's biographical essay in Who Is Ayn Rand? Heller also hired a Russian research team to find archival material related to Rand's early life in Russia. However, she was not granted access to the archives of the Ayn Rand Institute, which has numerous documents from Rand's estate.

== Contents ==
The book is a chronological biography of Rand. Each chapter covers a specific period of time indicated as part of the chapter title. An "Afterword" briefly describes what some of her former associates have done since her death. Although there are no footnotes in the main text, the book has a "Notes" section that explains the sources for passages.

== Reception ==
The book received overall positive reviews upon publication. Library Journal included it among its "Best Books 2009", and The New York Times Book Review named it one of their "100 Notable Books of 2009". In a review for Liberty, Stephen Cox called the book "engrossing" and "objective", although he disagreed with Heller's interpretations in some areas. In New York magazine, reviewer Sam Anderson said, "A truly neutral biography seems impossible (as) anyone deep enough to be an authority is probably either a true believer or a heretic. But Heller manages to find a nice middle ground; she seems equally happy exposing admirable and ugly secrets. Occasionally her tone seems a bit too casually reverential [...] Overall, though, Heller does a remarkable job with a subject who was almost cripplingly complex."

Several of the reviews compared the book with another biography of Rand, Goddess of the Market by Jennifer Burns, which focuses on Rand's intellectual development and influence on the libertarian and conservative movements, as opposed to Heller's focus on the details of Rand's life. In a review for The New York Times, Janet Maslin said the two books "make many of the same points and touch on many of the same biographical details", although Maslin prefers Heller's book for its greater detail. The two books were also reviewed jointly in The New Republic and Time.

== See also ==
- Objectivist movement
