= Goddess of the Market =

Non-fiction book by Jennifer Burns

- Cover of the first edition
- Author: Jennifer Burns
- Language: English
- Subject: Ayn Rand
- Publisher: Oxford University Press
- Publication date: 2009
- Publication place: United States
- Media type: Print
- Pages: 369
- ISBN: 978-0-19-532487-7
- OCLC: 313665028

Goddess of the Market: Ayn Rand and the American Right is a 2009 biography of Ayn Rand by historian Jennifer Burns. The author explores Rand's intellectual development and her relationship to the conservative and libertarian movements. The writing of Rand's books and the development of her philosophy of Objectivism are also covered.

== Background and publication history ==
Burns spent eight years working on the book, which began as a dissertation for her doctoral degree from the University of California at Berkeley. In the process of writing the book, Burns became the first independent historian given access to the Ayn Rand Archives, a collection of Rand's personal papers hosted by the Ayn Rand Institute. When the book was published by Oxford University Press in September 2009, Burns was an assistant professor of history at the University of Virginia. A paperback edition of the book was released in August 2011.

== Contents ==
The book is divided into four main sections. The first, titled "The Education of Ayn Rand, 1905–1943", covers Rand's life and intellectual development from birth until the publication of her novel The Fountainhead. The second, "From Novelist to Philosopher, 1944–1957" covers the period in which she wrote her last novel, Atlas Shrugged. The third section, "Who Is John Galt? 1957–1968", discusses the growth of the Objectivist movement based on Rand's philosophy, and her relationship and eventual break with her protégé Nathaniel Branden. The final section, "Legacies", covers the final years of Rand's life and the continuing reaction to her after her death. Burns also includes an "Essay on Sources" describing the scholarship about Rand and her own use of the Ayn Rand Archives.

== Reception ==
The book has received generally positive reviews. Booklist described it as a "thoroughly engaging biography" and "eminently readable". In a review for The Washington Times, libertarian journalist Brian Doherty said that the book provides "a proper sense of where Rand really stands in American ideological history." However, he says Burns is "less convincing" in showing "the connections between Rand and the American right wing" as indicated in the book's subtitle. A review by Nick Gillespie in The Wilson Quarterly said, "Burns is particularly sharp at analyzing how Cold War conservatives such as Buckley rejected Rand’s rationalism but eventually benefited from her popularity with college students during the 1960s." A brief review from Publishers Weekly was mixed, calling the book "exasperatingly detailed and slow-going at times", but complimenting Burns for her ability to "explicate the evolution of Rand's individualist worldview".

Several reviews compared the book with another biography of Rand, Ayn Rand and the World She Made by Anne Heller, which was also released in 2009. Heller's book focuses on the details of Rand's life, in contrast to the intellectual history focused on by Burns. In a review for The New York Times, Janet Maslin said the two books "make many of the same points and touch on many of the same biographical details", although Maslin prefers Heller's book for its greater detail. The two books were also reviewed jointly in The New Republic and Time.

On October 15, 2009, Burns was interviewed about the book on The Daily Show. Host Jon Stewart said it was "incredible timing" for the book to be released at a time when Rand was experiencing a "resurgence ... in the culture", a reference to the popularity of Rand's writing among contemporary conservatives, including the Tea Party movement.

== See also ==
- Objectivism and libertarianism
