= José Iturbi =

Spanish musician (1895–1980)

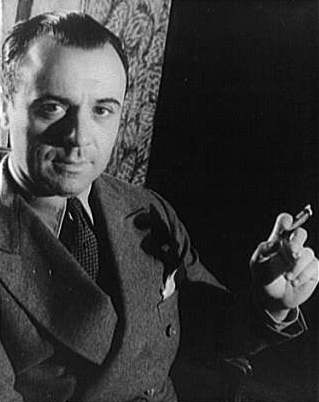
- Photo by Carl Van Vechten, 1933

Background information
- Born: José Iturbi Báguena; 28 November 1895; Valencia, Spain
- Died: 28 June 1980 (aged 84) Los Angeles, California, U.S.
- Genres: Classical
- Occupations: Conductor, pianist
- Instrument: Piano
- Formerly of: Rochester Philharmonic

José Iturbi Báguena (28 November 1895 – 28 June 1980) was a Spanish conductor, pianist, harpsichordist and actor.

He also appeared in several Metro-Goldwyn-Mayer musical films including Thousands Cheer (1943), Music for Millions (1944), Anchors Aweigh (1945), That Midnight Kiss (1949), and Three Daring Daughters (1948), his only leading role.

== Biography ==
Born in Valencia, Spain, Iturbi showed a talent for classical music at an early age, and began musical studies there. He later moved to Paris in order to proceed with his studies with Victor Staub at the Paris Conservatory on a scholarship from the Diputació de Valencia. At this time, he also undertook studies in keyboard technique and interpretation with the harpsichordist Wanda Landowska. His worldwide concert tours, beginning around 1912, were very successful. He made his American debut in New York City in 1929.

Between 1911 and 1937, Iturbi was the frequent accompanist to the Spanish violinist Manuel Quiroga on his international tours. On June 8, 1937, Iturbi had just said goodbye to the violinist after accompanying him at a concert in New York City when Quiroga was struck and severely injured by a truck in Times Square, which led to the premature end of his career.

In 1933, Iturbi made his first appearance as a conductor in Mexico City when presented by impresario Ernesto de Quesada from Conciertos Daniel. In April 1936, Iturbi was injured in the crash and sinking of Pan American Airways' Puerto Rican Clipper in Port-of-Spain, Trinidad. After the incident, he said he would not be able to play "for some time", and "I may not be able to conduct again." Later that year, he was named conductor of the Rochester Philharmonic Orchestra in Rochester, New York, serving until 1944. He also led the Valencia Symphony Orchestra for many years.

Iturbi often appeared in concert with his sister, Amparo, also a renowned pianist. The liner notes to the two-record box set of Gershwin: Rhapsody in Blue (two-piano arrangements by José and Amparo Iturbi) read:

Arranged by José and Amparo Iturbi with the former conducting the RCA Victor Symphony Orchestra as well as playing one of the two solo parts ... The arrangers use the two pianos to thicken resonances and to invigorate what was purely orchestral tissue with the bony brittleness of the piano. ... The Iturbis perform this spirited work in a brilliant virtuoso fashion ...

Iturbi was also a noted harpsichordist and made several short instructional films using the re-emergent early 20th-century French Pleyel et Cie pedaled metal-framed harpsichord made famous by Wanda Landowska.

I feel that classical music should be a more recognizable part of everyone's entertainment. It has been my hope that through live concerts, motion pictures, recordings, international competitions, and interesting public forums, a larger group of people will learn to love classical music and attend live concert performances.

— José Iturbi, 1950

External audio
- You may hear José Iturbi performing and conducting Piano Concerto No. 1 in E-flat major, S. 124 by Franz Liszt with the RCA Victor Symphony Orchestra in 1953 Here on archive.org

Iturbi appeared as an actor-performer in several Metro-Goldwyn-Mayer film musicals beginning with Thousands Cheer (1943) with Judy Garland and in Three Daring Daughters (1948) starring Jeanette MacDonald. He usually appeared as himself in these films. He was also featured in Anchors Aweigh, starring Gene Kelly, Frank Sinatra and Kathryn Grayson, as well as in several other MGM pictures. In the biopic about Frédéric Chopin, A Song to Remember, Iturbi's playing was used in the soundtrack in scenes where Cornel Wilde, as Chopin, was playing the piano. In close-up shots, the hands of Ervin Nyiregyházi were shown rather than Iturbi's.

== Personal life ==
Iturbi married María Giner de los Santos in 1916; she died in 1928. They had one child, María. In 1936 Iturbi's daughter married Stephan Hero, an American concert violinist who had been one of her father's protégés. They had two daughters, Maria Antonia and Maria Theresa, then separated in 1939. María Hero had obtained legal custody of the children in her 1941 divorce; her former husband had them for three months of each year.

In 1943, Iturbi took his daughter to court for custody of the girls, calling her unfit, according to The New York Times. In 1946, at age 28, Iturbi's daughter died by suicide. Hero absconded with his daughters while Iturbi was on a European concert tour in 1947. After a court battle of several months, Iturbi and his former son-in-law ultimately resolved their differences, and the girls remained with their father.

Iturbi's companion for many years was Marion Seabury, his secretary, who survived him and founded the José Iturbi Foundation after his death.

== Death ==
José Iturbi continued his public performances until March, 1980 when he was ordered by his doctors to take a sabbatical for health reasons. Five days after being admitted to Cedars-Sinai Hospital for heart problems, he died on June 28, 1980, aged 84, five months shy of his 85th birthday.

== Legacy ==
External audio
- You may hear José Iturbi conducting Symphony No. 9 in E minor, Op.95 (From the New World) Op. 95 by Antonin Dvorak with the Rochester Philharmonic Orchestra in 1941 Here on archive.org
- José Iturbi conducting and performing Franz Liszt's Piano Concerto No. 1 in E-flat major, S124 with the RCA Victor Orchestra in 1953 here on archive.org

Two music competitions have been established in Iturbi's name:

- the Valencia International Piano Competition Prize Iturbi commenced in 1981 and is often known as the José Iturbi International Piano Competition.
- the José Iturbi International Music Competition commenced in 2007 and awards prizes for pianists and opera singers.

The Philharmonic Concert Hall in Valencia is named after Jose Iturbi.

== In popular culture ==
Iturbi is referenced in Philip Roth's bestselling Portnoy's Complaint, where the women in Portnoy's neighborhood call a talented young pianist "José Iturbi the Second". The pianist kills himself because of his overpowering mother and thus becomes a memento to the protagonist, who also has to deal with a dominant mother.

Cormac McCarthy honored Iturbi with a moment of colloquial humor in Suttree, his semi-autobiographical novel published in 1979. Conversing with his Aunt Martha on the topic of dogs once owned between himself and his ancestors, he proclaimed "We had one named Jose Iturbi. Because it was the peeinest dog."

One episode of the 1940s radio sitcom Amos 'n' Andy featured Iturbi unexpectedly getting a piano lesson from Andy Brown (who received a certificate from a correspondence school) and George "Kingfish" Stevens.
