= Amparo Iturbi =

Spanish pianist

Amparo Iturbi Báguena (12 March 1898 – 22 April 1969) was a Spanish pianist.

== Early career ==
Amparo Iturbi Báguena was born in Valencia, Spain, one of four children of Ricardo Iturbi (a piano tuner) and Teresa (Baguena) Iturbi.

The younger sister of José Iturbi, she gave her debut concert at age 15 in Barcelona. In 1925, she gave her first important concert outside Spain. She played in Paris, at the Salle Gaveau.

This was followed by dual piano recitals with José, touring Italy, Switzerland, Belgium, the Netherlands, and England. She accompanied the famous Catalan soprano Maria Barrientos. It was not until 1937 that she first played in the United States. She had one daughter, also named Amparo, by a brief marriage. The younger Amparo led an internationally renowned flamenco troupe and taught dance. Amparo Iturbi was a pioneer of the Spanish piano repertoire in the U.S., until the arrival of Alicia de Larrocha in 1965.

== Film career ==
She had guest roles, playing herself, alongside her brother in the following MGM musicals:

- Two Girls and a Sailor (1944)
- Holiday in Mexico (1946)
- Three Daring Daughters (1948)
- That Midnight Kiss (1949)

She was on the soundtrack of Three Daring Daughters (1948). Ámparo Iturbi appeared in films only long enough to play the piano with her brother. Known for their twin piano-playing, the pair appeared on The Jimmy Durante Show in 1955 and on The Bell Telephone Hour in 1962. There were many recordings released as a duo and singly. A CD, "Celebrated Artistry-Mozart/José & Ámparo Iturbi", was released in 1999.

== Damehood ==
She was named a Dame of the Cross of the Order of Isabella the Catholic in 1958 in Spain.

== Honorary scholarships ==
- At California State University (Fresno), a special scholarship is available in Ámparo Iturbi's name.
- José Iturbi established a scholarship fund in memory of his sister, whom he outlived by more than a decade, for music majors, particularly those specializing in piano at Loyola Marymount University.
  She had regular piano recitals at her home for the more advanced students and her brother would sometimes attend. Her rate was $25 per hour in the early 1950s, but she showed kindness and generosity to beginner students by offering them her "scholarship" for good achievement, whereby one free lesson was given for each one paid. Her students loved her dearly and some would invite her to dinner at their homes on a regular basis.

== Death ==
Ámparo Iturbi died on 22 April 1969 in Beverly Hills, California, from a brain tumor, aged 71.
