= Henri Hell =

Henri Hell (30 October 1916 – 6 April 1991), pseudonym for José Enrique Lasry, was a French art, music and literary critic, as well as a musicologist.

As a literary critic, Henri Hell collaborated with Fontaine, Combat, la Table Ronde, l'Express, Nouvel Observateur, Le Monde, the Nouvelle Revue Française. He assisted Max-Pol Fouchet in the management of the magazine Fontaine. He was a music critic at la Revue Musicale, Nouveau Candide, la Table Ronde, the Gazette de Lausanne, Mercure de France. He directed the Fayard publishing house. Finally, he published a reference book on Francis Poulenc at the same house. He was also an art columnist.

== Bibliography ==
- 1944: La France au cœur : Chroniques de la servitude et de la libération, juin 1940–juin 1943, foreword to the work by Max-Pol Fouchet
- 1956: L'amour vagabond, contribution to the novel by André Fraigneau, Paris, Plon
- 1957: Les Élus du Seigneur, French translation of Go Tell It on the Mountain by James Baldwin
- 1958: Francis Poulenc, musicien français, Plon, Fayard, 1978. Read online in English
- 1962: L'univers romanesque de Marguerite Duras
- 1990: Un regard, preface of the work by Stephen Spender
- Correspondence with René Étiemble
- Correspondence with François Nourissier
- Correspondence with Francis Poulenc, 1951
