= Jennifer Burns (historian) =

American historian (born 1975)

Jennifer Burns (born 1975) is an American historian serving as the Edgar E. Robinson Professor in United States History at Stanford University and as a research fellow at the Hoover Institution. She previously served as assistant professor of history at the University of Virginia from 2007 to 2012. Her research focuses on 20th-century U.S. political and cultural history, including the history of markets, capitalism, and economic ideas.

Burns has published major intellectual biographies of American political-economic thinkers, notably Goddess of the Market (2009) and Milton Friedman: The Last Conservative (2023). Goddess of the Market was reviewed in outlets such as Booklist, The Washington Times, and The New York Times, generally receiving a favorable reception.

== Early life and education ==
Burns grew up in Connecticut. She received her bachelor's degree in history from Harvard University in 1998 and her MA and PhD in history from the University of California, Berkeley.

== Works ==
=== Goddess of the Market: Ayn Rand and the American Right ===
Burns' 2009 book, Goddess of the Market: Ayn Rand and the American Right, examines Ayn Rand's intellectual and political influence, as well as her complex personal life. Burns received access to Rand's personal archives, the Ayn Rand Papers, which helped her provide a detailed account of Rand's rise to prominence, particularly her development of Objectivist philosophy and its enduring impact on American conservatism. Burns highlights Rand's important relationships, including her affair with Nathaniel Branden, who played a significant role in her intellectual circle. Rand's contentious relationship with religious conservatism and her evolving views on libertarianism are also explored. Burns shows why Rand's philosophy continues to resonate and how her life and reputation diverged from the ideals she championed.

As part of the promotion of the book, Burns was interviewed by Jon Stewart on The Daily Show.

=== Milton Friedman: The Last Conservative ===
Burns' 2023 book, Milton Friedman: The Last Conservative, explores the life and ideas of Milton Friedman, an important figure in 20th-century economics. Burns delves into Friedman's role in shaping modern economic thought, his contributions to the understanding of inflation, and the evolution of economics as a profession. Burns portrays Friedman not just as an economist but as a public intellectual whose advocacy for personal freedom and critique of government intervention left a lasting impact on American conservatism. Burns traces Friedman's career from his early days in the era before mathematical modeling dominated economics, describing his ability to voice complex ideas to a broader audience. The book also examines Friedman's willingness to collaborate with female economists, as well as his openness to promoting ideas that were initially out of favor. Burns situates Friedman alongside Rand, noting the parallel tracks through which both figures advanced libertarian ideas, contributing to the conservative shift in American political ideology in the late 20th century. Burn's choice to label Friedman a conservative was criticized by David R. Henderson of the Cato Institute. Henderson states that Friedman would be more accurately described as a classical liberal due to some of his social views.

== Honors and awards ==
In 1998, Burns was awarded the Thomas T. Hoopes Prize by Harvard University. In 2010, she was named Top Young Historian by the History News Network. For the 2017–2018 years, she was honoured with the Fellowship for University Professors by the National Endowment for the Humanities. In 2025, Burns was the recipient of the Reagan Foundation's "Age of Reagan Conference Book Prize" for her 2023 biography of Milton Friedman.
