= Raymond Trouard =

French classical pianist (1916–2008)

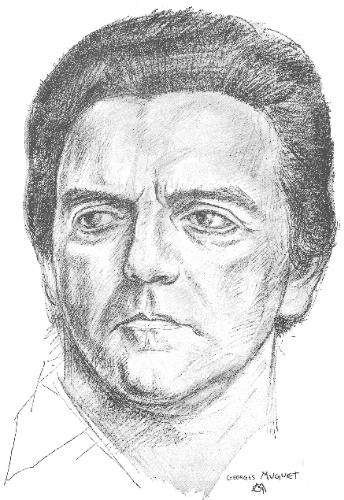
Raymond Trouard (drawing by Georges Muguet)

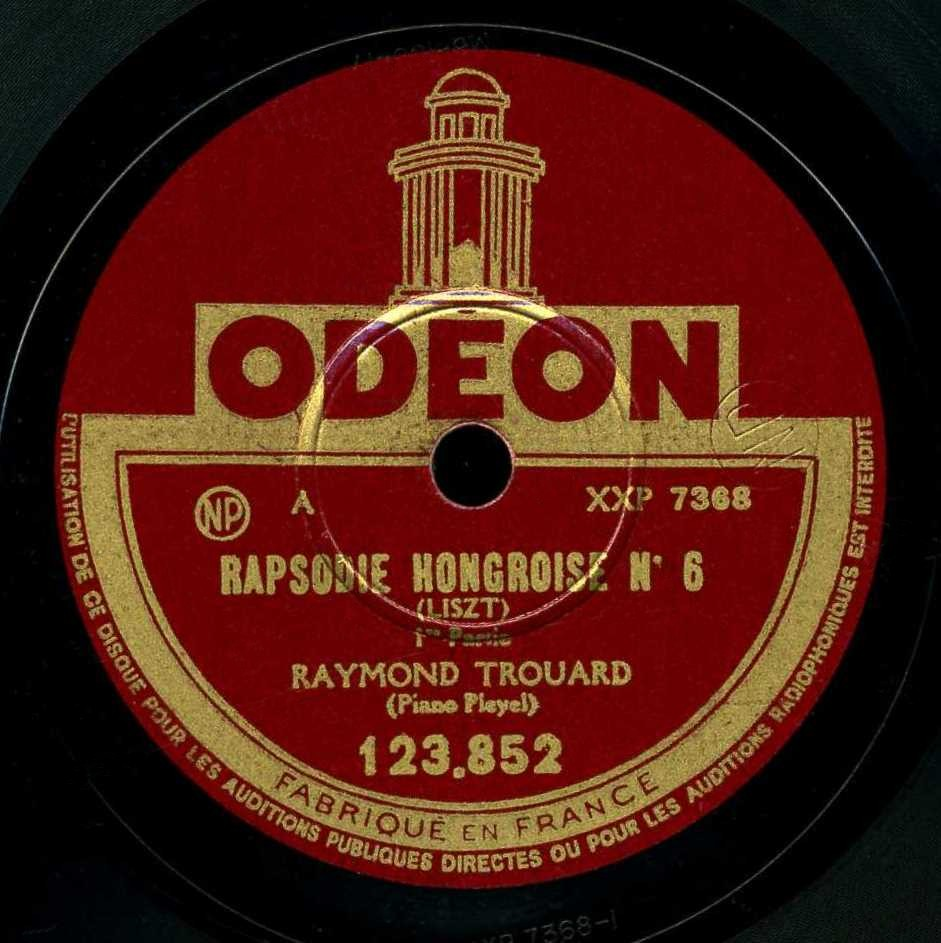
78rpm by Raymond Trouard - Liszt

Raymond Trouard (9 August 1916 – 17 December 2008) was a French classical pianist.

== Life ==
Born in Étampes, Trouard had André Bloch, Joseph Morpain, Victor Staub, Emil von Sauer, Marcel Dupré, Paul Dukas, Philippe Gaubert and Bruno Walter as teachers at the Conservatoire de Paris. His classmates included Maurice Baquet, Henri Betti, Paul Bonneau, Léo Chauliac, Henri Dutilleux, Louiguy and Pierre Spiers. He won his First Prize in piano in 1933 and a Second Prize in directing in 1937. He perfected his musical studies with Yves Nat, Sergueï Rachmaninov, Manuel Infante, and Maurice Ravel.

Trouard gave his first piano recital in 1935. He won the 1st Louis Diémer Grand Prix in 1939. This was the beginning of a great international career that would take him all over the world: in France of course, but all over Europe. He also played in South and North Americas. He played in recital and with orchestra under the direction of the greatest conductors: Philippe Gaubert, Pierre Monteux, Eugène Bigot, André Cluytens, Pierre Dervaux, Richard Beck, Carl Schuricht. His repertoire was vast, from Bach to Dutilleux. He excelled in Liszt whose technique and spirit he possessed through his relationship with Emil von Sauer.

Trouard was one of the great interpreters of Frédéric Chopin. On the disc, he gave a reference version of the 14 waltzes. He made numerous recordings for Odeon, then CBS, and EMI. These recordings have been remastered, and have been re-released (May 2008) in an 11-CD box set by the Sony firm, a box set entitled " Raymond Trouard : Une vie pour le piano ".

In 1953, he took part in the short film Trois hommes et un piano by André Berthomieu, in which he played three pieces of classical music as well as C'est si bon with Henri Betti and Léo Chauliac.

Trouard had many students such as Michel Dalberto, Jean-Gabriel Ferlan, Eric Ferrer and Marc-Henri Lamande, at the Conservatoire de Paris where he was a teacher from 1969 until 1985.

Trouard died in Paris at the age of 92.

== Recordings ==
LPs

- Beethoven, Piano Sonatas 8, 14 and 23 (1962, LP Odeon XOC 813 / Senator WSR-814 / CBS 51013)
- Chopin, Recital (LP Odéon ODX 143)
- Chopin, "Récital Chopin au Palais de Chaillot" (LP Odéon XOC 810)
- Chopin, Valses (1965, LP Odéon XOC 803 / CBS 51003)
- Liszt, Piano Concertos - Raymond Trouard, piano; Orchestre Colonne, Eugène Bigot conducting, Odeon Records XOC 808 / CBS 51008)
- Liszt, Liebesträume, La campanella, Rhapsodies hongroises 2, 6 and 15. (LP Odéon XOC 806 / CBS 51006)
- Liszt, Sonata in B minor, Funérailles, Légendes (LP CBS 51086)

CDs

- "Raymond Trouard, une vie pour le piano" (1948–1965, 11CD Sony 88697 318462) OCLC 658359800
