= Salle Gaveau =

Classical venue in Paris

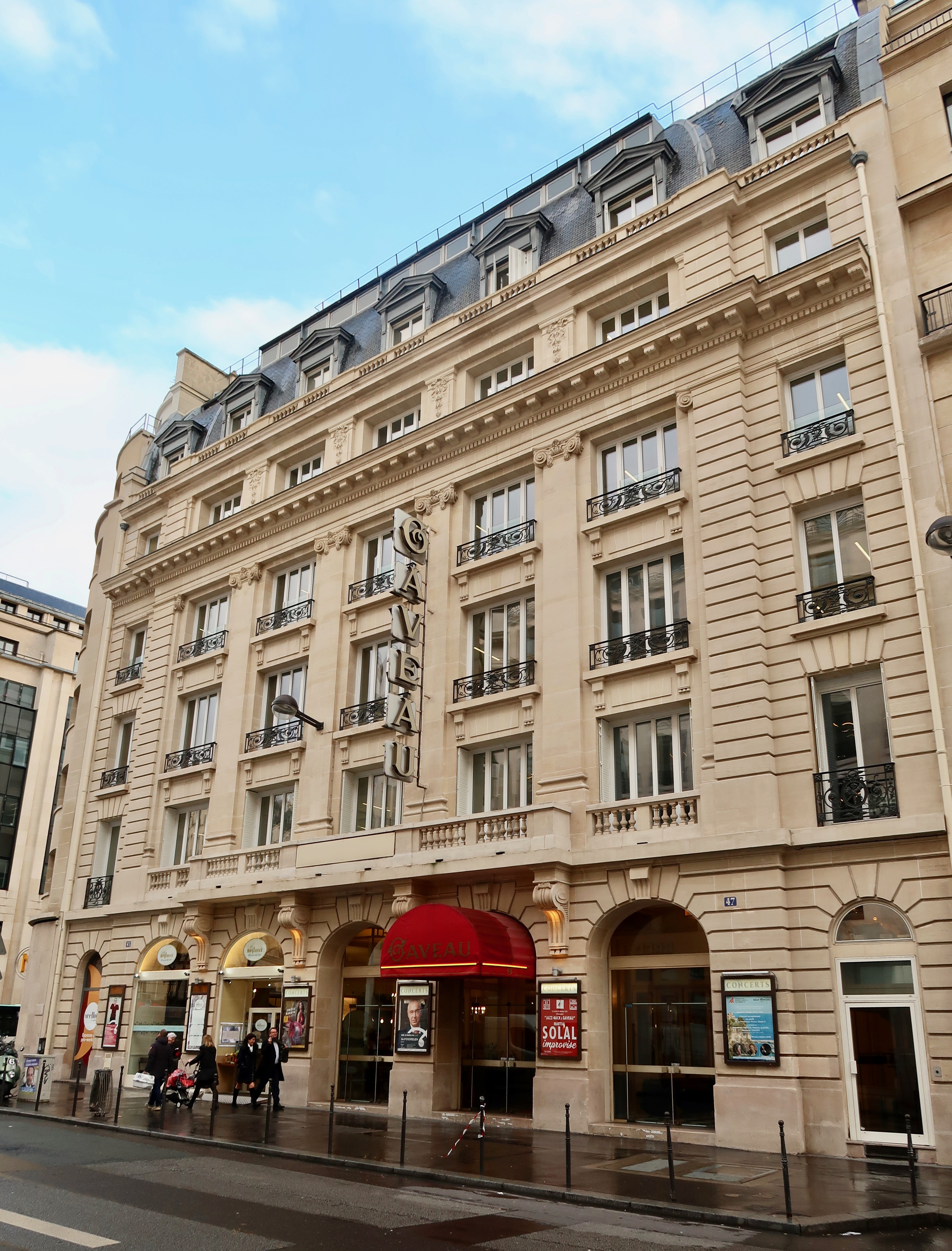
- Interactive map of Salle Gaveau
- Address: 47 rue La Boétie; Paris; France
- Coordinates: 48°52′24″N 2°18′51″E
- Type: Performing arts center
- Current use: Concert hall

Construction
- Opened: 1907
- Architect: Jacques Hermant

Website
- www.sallegaveau.com

The Salle Gaveau (French pronunciation: [sal ɡavo]), named after the French piano maker Gaveau, is a classical concert hall in Paris, located at 45-47 rue La Boétie, in the 8th arrondissement of Paris. It is particularly intended for chamber music.

== Construction ==
The plans for the hall were drawn up by Jacques Hermant in 1905, the year the land was acquired. The construction of the Gaveau building took place from 1906 to 1907. The vocation of this hall was chamber music from the beginning, and its seating capacity was a thousand, just as it is today. The hall was home to a large organ built in 1900 by the Cavaillé-Coll firm. This instrument with 39 stops (8 on the positif expressif, 10 on the récit expressif, 12 on the grand-orgue organ and 7 on the pedal) was subsequently installed in 1957 in the commune of Saint-Saëns in Normandy. The hall is a concert venue renowned for its exceptional acoustics.

== Beginnings ==
The hall opened its doors on 3 October 1907 for the concert of the Lehrergesangverein (Teachers' Choir of the city of Bremen with one hundred and forty performers). It immediately became a prestigious hall. Camille Saint-Saëns' concert in the Salle Gaveau [audience and orchestra from the stage]; then other famous musicians gave concerts there from the first months after the opening. The concerts Lamoureux, conducted by Camille Chevillard, Vincent d'Indy and André Messager, moved to Gaveau. On 5, 8 and 12 November 1907, Alfred Cortot, Jacques Thibaud and Pablo Casals performed the complete trios by Beethoven. In the following years, the Salle Gaveau hosted Eugène Ysaÿe (21 January 1908), Lazare-Lévy (27 January 1909), Marguerite Long (11 December 1911), Georges Enesco (8 February 1912), Fritz Kreisler (21 and 28 April 1912), Wilhelm Backhaus (15 May 1912), Claude Debussy (5 May 1917).

== World Wars ==
During the First World War, the Salle Gaveau was used to give shows to soldiers and victims. However, it continued its original activity. During the interwar period, the hall hosted Charles Munch (28 October 1933), Wanda Landowska (7 November 1933), Rudolf Serkin (2 December 1933), and Yves Nat in 1934. The Lamoureux concerts continued to be held there.

The same scenario occurred during the Second World War, when Gaveau was once again used as a gala venue, while hosting famous musicians such as Jacques Février, Pierre Fournier, Samson François, Paul Tortelier, and Raymond Trouard. The concert season continued after the war. In 1955, for example, the hall welcomed Reine Flachot, Pierre Bernac, Francis Poulenc, and Alexandre Lagoya.

== Purchase by the Fournier couple ==
In 1963, Gaveau went bankrupt. This led to the sale of the Gaveau building to an insurance company, and it was destined to be destroyed for the construction of a car park. Chantal and Jean-Marie Fournier, a couple of passionate musicians, bought the hall in 1976.

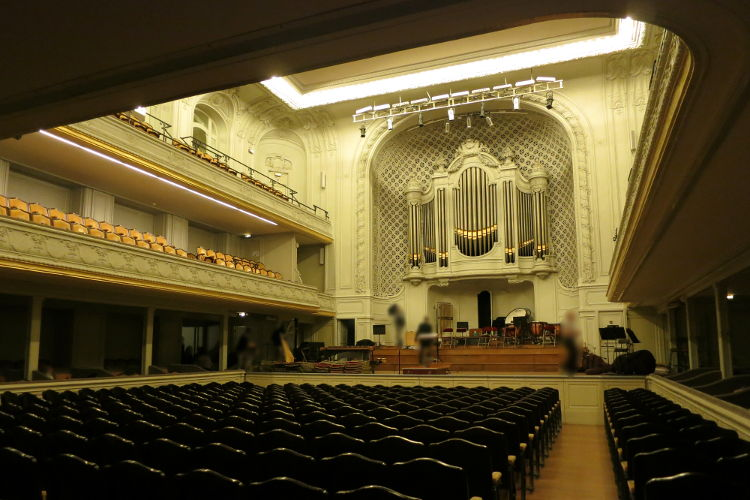
View of the interior of the Salle Gaveau in 2013

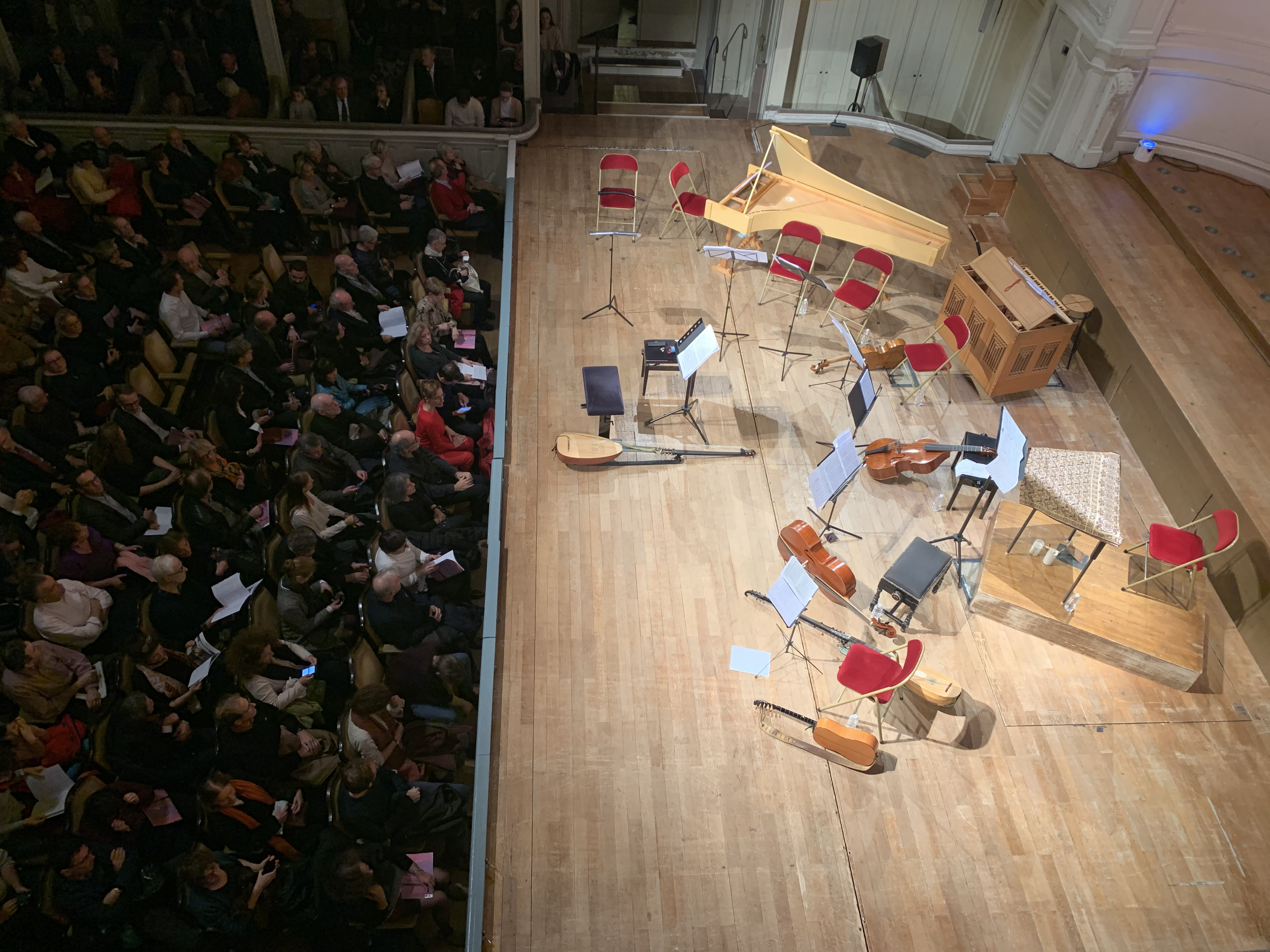
Stage of the Salle Gaveau seen from above during a concert in 2019

In 1982, the house was listed in the inventory and then classified as a Historic Monument in 1992. Chantal and Jean-Marie Fournier then sought to have it restored, the condition of the venue gradually declining. Subsidies were obtained, and the work was carried out by Alain-Charles Perrot the chief architect of the Monuments Historiques. The hall reopened on 8 January 2001. It was restored in a more sober way than before, i.e. by seeking to recover the colours and ornaments of 1907.

In October 2024 it was announced that the concert hall had been bought for 8 million euros by Jean-Marc Dumontet, a businessman and arts promoter at the time owner of six venues in Paris (Bobino, le Théâtre Antoine, le Théâtre Libre, la Scène Libre, Le Grand Point-Virgule et Le Point-Virgule).

== Works premiered at Salle Gaveau ==
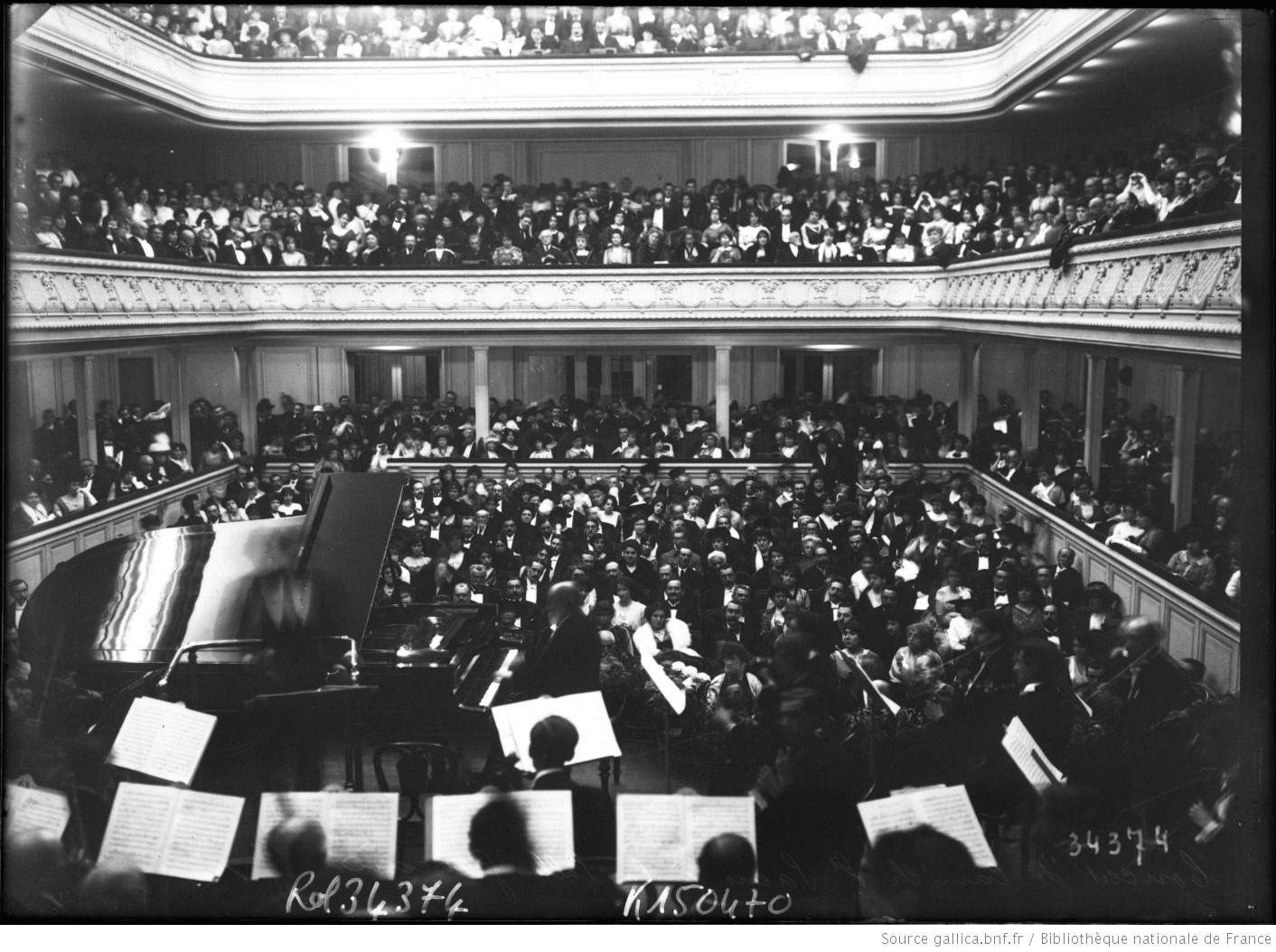
Camille Saint-Saëns at Salle Gaveau in 1913 with Pierre Monteux

- Ravel: Valses Nobles et Sentimentales for piano, in 1911
- Vierne: Troisième Symphonie (with Marcel Dupré organ), in 1912
- Ravel: Piano Trio, in 1915
- Debussy: Sonate pour violon et piano, with Gaston Poulet, in 1917
- Ravel: Le Tombeau de Couperin, by Marguerite Long, 11 April 1919
- Albert Roussel: Le Marchand de Sable qui passe, stage music, in 1919
- Augustin Barié: Symphonie pour orgue, by André Marchal, in 1922
- Georges Enescu: String Quartet No. 1, French premiere 18 October 1921
- Schönberg: Pierrot lunaire, French premiere; conductor Darius Milhaud, vocalist Marya Freund, organizer Jean Wiéner, and translator Jacques Benoist-Méchin; 12 January 1922
- Schönberg: Herzgewächse, world premiere; conductor Darius Milhaud, soprano Mathilde Veille-Lavallée or Renée Valnay (sources differ), Francis Poulenc on celesta, and concert organizer Jean Wiéner on harmonium; 30 March 1922
- Arthur Honegger: Roi David, French premiere 15 March 1924
- Vierne: Pièces de Fantaisie by Marcel Dupré in 1926
- Guy Ropartz: Troisième Sonate pour violon et piano, French premiere by Georges Enescu violin and Marcel Ciampi piano, 21 April 1928
- Enescu: Troisième Sonate pour violon et piano dans le caractère populaire roumain, French premiere with Nicolae Caravia piano, 28 March 1927
- Stravinsky: Concerto pour deux pianos solos, with the composer and his son Sviatoslav Soulima, 1935
- Francis Poulenc: Telle Jour, telle Nuit song cycle based on poems by Paul Éluard, by Pierre Bernac, 3 February 1937
- Enescu: Troisième Sonate pour piano, by Marcel Ciampi, 6 December 1938
- Messiaen: Vingt Regards sur l'enfant-Jésus, by Yvonne Loriod piano, 26 March 1944
- Duruflé: Requiem, by the Orchestre National de France directed by Roger Désormière with Camille Maurane and Hélène Bouvier, in 1947
- Poulenc: Sonate pour violoncelle et piano, in 1949
- Pierre Schaeffer: Étude aux Objets, 30 June 1959
- Jacques Castérède: Sonate pour piano, by Françoise Thinat, in 1967
- Laurent Petitgirard: Quintette avec piano, in 1977
- Rodion Shchedrin: Bribes Russes for cello (commissioned by the international Mstislav Rostropovitch competition), in 1990
- Bruno Mantovani: Appel d'Air for flute and piano (commissioned by the international Jean-Pierre Rampal competition), in 2001
- Philippe Hersant: Concerto pour harpe et orchestre (Le Tombeau de Virgile) by Isabelle Moretti, in 2006
- Thierry Pécou: Concerto pour piano et orchestre (L'Oiseau Innumérable), by Alexandre Tharaud, in 2006
- Oliver Twist, le musical after the novel by Charles Dickens, in 2016

== See also ==
- Salle Pleyel
