= Éliane Richepin =

French classical pianist

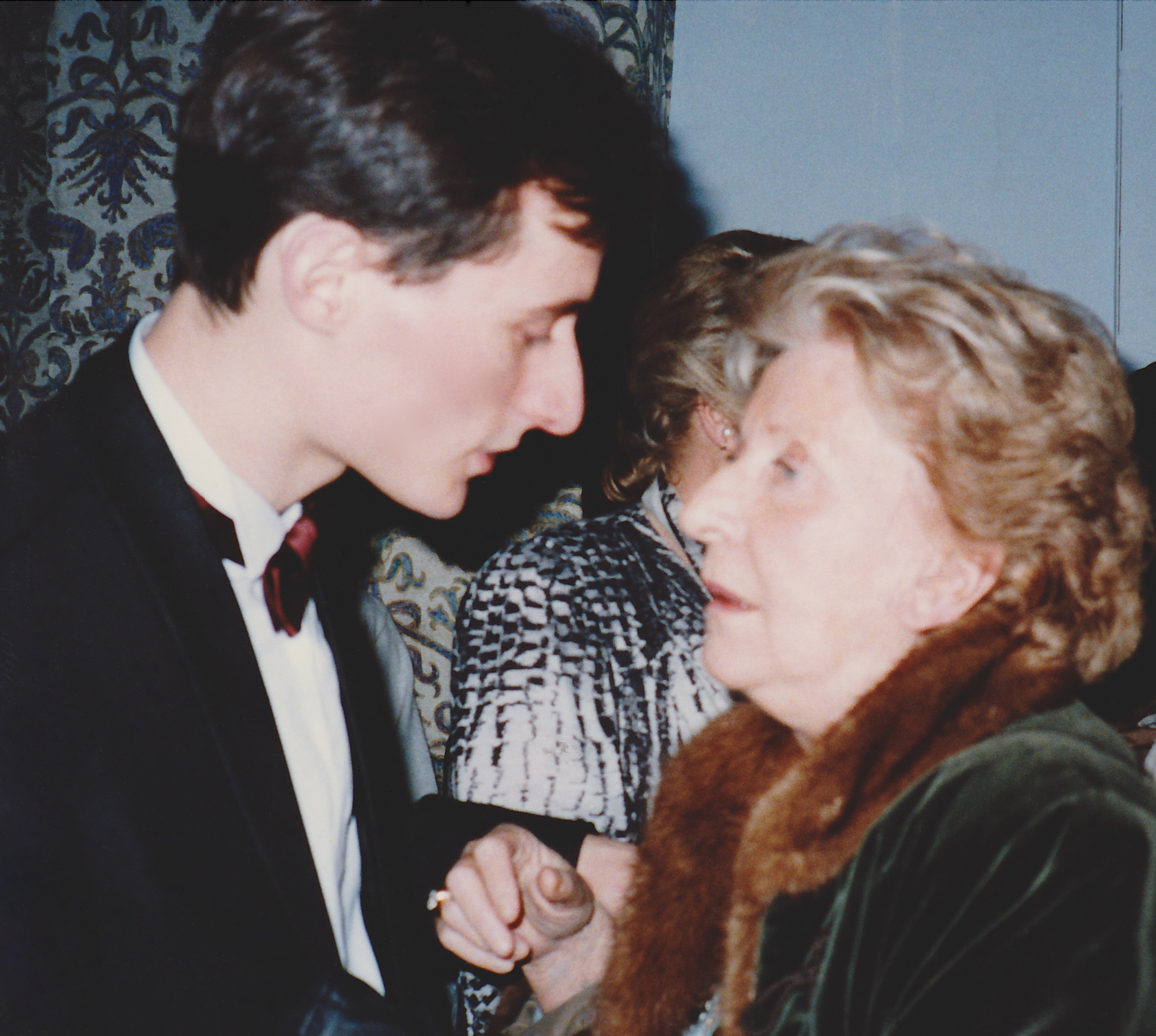
- Eliane Richepin after a concert by one of her students at Salle Gaveau in Paris (1989)

Background information
- Birth name: Éliane Anaïse Adrienne Pradelle
- Born: 23 November 1910; Paris, France
- Died: 9 March 1999 (aged 88); Paris, France
- Genres: Classical
- Instrument: Piano
- Spouse: Tristan Richepin

Éliane Richepin (23 November 1910 – 9 March 1999) was a French classical pianist.

== Biography ==
Richepin studied music at the Conservatoire de Paris where she received several first prizes: piano, harmony, fugue, counterpoint and musical composition. She was a pupil of Georges Falkenberg, Marguerite Long, Alfred Cortot and Yves Nat for the piano, Paul Fauchet and Noël Gallon for harmony, fugue and counterpoint and Henri Büsser for composition. Logiste at the Prix de Rome in 1938, École des Beaux-Arts Prize in 1943 for her work Fantaisie pour piano et orchestre which she premiered with the Pasdeloup Orchestra under the direction of French conductor and composer Albert Wolff, her international career grew considerably.

A member of the jury at the Conservatoire de Paris, she was invited to major international competitions such as the Long-Thibaud-Crespin Competition, the Busoni, Vercelli, Buenos-Aires, Porto, Rio de Janeiro, Maria Canals (Barcelona) competitions, and the prestigious International Chopin Piano Competition. The Philadelphia Orchestra named her an honorary member at the end of one of the concerts she gave during a tour in the USA. Since the beginning of her career in 1946, Richepin gave more than 1.200 recitals and 700 concerts with orchestra under the direction of the greatest conductors of the moment.

Not only being an accomplished pianist, she devoted part of her activities to the organization of important cultural and artistic events. She is the founder and president of the Montevideo International Piano Competition, part of the world federation of international competitions and who, back in France in the early 1970s, founded and presided over the Annecy International Music Centre, which offers a choice teaching provided by leading figures in French pedagogy such as Joseph Calvet, Reine Flachot, Roger Bourdin, Daniel Deffayet and Michèle Auclair.

At the same time, she founded the Université Musicale Internationale de Paris (UMIP), bringing together a large number of her artistic friends, eminent teachers such as Livia Rev, Miłosz Magin, Julien Falk, Anne-Marie Mangeot, Devy Erlih, Oscar Caceres, Isabelle Nef, Annie Challan. Invited all over the world to give masterclasses in piano pedagogic centers (Tokyo, Moscow, Sofia, Osaka, Berlin, Warsaw, London, Athens), Richepin was particularly attached to the discovery and support of young pianists during her long teaching career. Grand officer of the Légion d'honneur, she rests in the cemetery of Auvers-sur-Oise near the church and the Festival she loved so much.

== Pupils ==
Among her pupils were Carlos Cebro, Jacques Delannoy, Pascal Escande, (founder of the Auvers-sur-Oise Festival Pascal Gallet, Matthieu Gonet, Pascal Jourdan, Jean-Pascal Meyer, Florence Millet, Roger Muraro, Julia Tamamdjieva, Demis Visvikis, François Weigel.

== Homage ==
Richepin died in Paris on 9 March 1999.

"One of the greatest interpreters of our time" - Detroit Times.

"How did she play? Eliane Richepin was not a wild virtuoso and her playing owed nothing to Marguerite Long's overarticulated piano. Eliane Richepin's deep sonority, imaginative phrasing, sometimes daring rubato owed much to Alfred Cortot and her own conception of Chopin, Ravel and Debussy of which she was a remarkable performer. If Éliane Richepin did not externalize a "pianism" that she exclusively put at the service of music, she did not lack means. At the age of seventy-five, she still played Chopin's twenty-four Preludes which, in many respects, remain the pantheon of piano technique".

— Alain Lompech, Le Monde 15 March 1999.

== Selected discography ==
- Chopin: 24 Préludes Op. 28 - Disque Variance (33 Tours Mono-Stéréo) (1973) - Référence VR 33531 (D).
- Chopin: 4 Ballades et 4 Mazurkas Op. 30 - Disque REM - Référence 10183 XT
