= Pascal Gallet =

French pianist

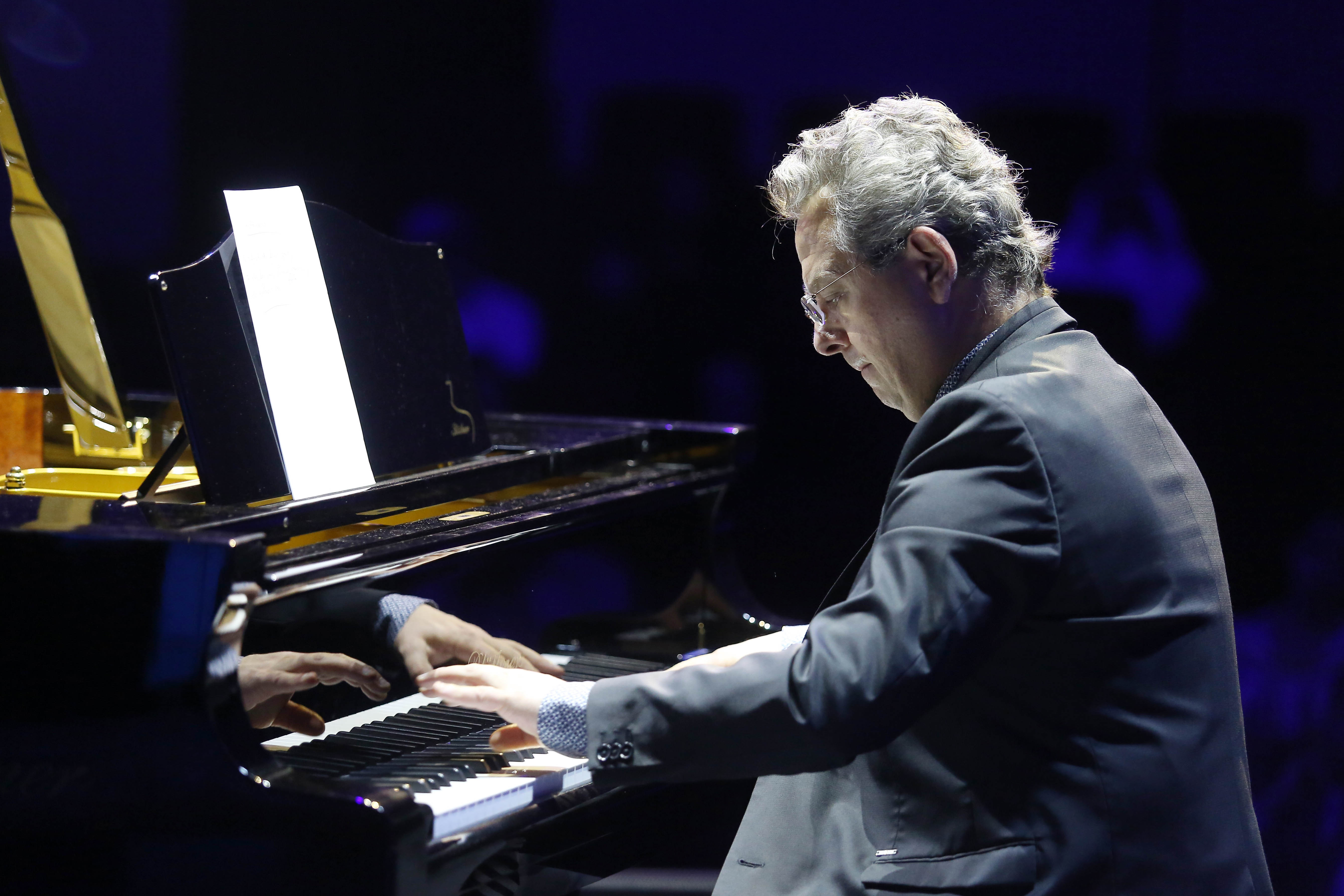
Pascal Gallet, Dubai recital

Pascal Gallet is a French classical pianist.

== Biography ==
His first television appearance at the age of 10 encouraged Gallet in the pianistic path. He entered the Conservatoire de Paris at a very young age and followed Pierre Sancan's, then Yvonne Loriod's and Éliane Richepin's classes.

In 1987, he was unanimously awarded a 1st prize and followed the advanced training cycle. He remains a disciple of Teresa Llacuna. He has won the Viotti-Valsesia, Porto, Trapani, Menuhin Foundation international competitions.

He is in the line of pianists who had the privilege of meeting Olivier Messiaen very closely at a very young age. The French composer dedicated two excerpts from his Catalogue d'oiseaux to him.

Gallet then began a solo career first in France, then internationally (Calgary Philharmonic Orchestra, UNAM Mexico Philharmonic Orchestra, Duisburg Philharmonic conducted by Jonathan Darlington, Winnipeg Philharmonic Orchestra). He then toured extensively in Canada, the United States (New York), Mexico, Italy, Spain, Switzerland, Serbia, China, Taiwan and Japan. He performed at Salle Gaveau, Théâtre du Châtelet, Salle Molière and Opéra Nouvel in Lyon and played in chamber music ensembles with Marielle Nordmann, François-René Duchable, Renaud Capuçon, the Enesco Quartet, Joseph Silverstein.

He added to his repertoire many contemporary premieres such as those of Thierry Pécou and Jörg Widmann.

Pascal Gallet is the only pianist in the world to have recorded André Jolivet's complete works for piano. He was the only one to record live Jolivet's only concerto (1951) (with the Duisburg Philharmonic).

On the radio, he was welcomed by Radio Classique, France Musique, France Culture, France Inter and, on his native lands, Radio Aix-les-Bains. On television, he was invited on France 2, Arte, Mezzo with Laure Mezan, François Hudry, Anne-Charlotte Reymond, Cécille Gilly Frédéric Lodéon and Ève Ruggiéri.

Musical critic Alain Lompech, wrote "Let's not doubt it: Pascal Gallet's interpretation of Chopin's 2nd sonata is worthy of the greatest, Alfred Cortot, Nelson Freire, Martha Argerich. We are in the presence of one of the greatest pianists of this generation" (Diapason 2006).

For 12 years, Gallet directed the Piano Festivals in Fontmorigny abbey and "Nuits au château du Cingle".

He was awarded the Béatrice de Savoie prize in July 2014. In May 2014, Gallet was appointed professor at the Conservatoire de Marseille. Two recordings were released this year 2014. An album dedicated to Henri Collet and another "classical cinema" recording, alternating the classical repertoire and the film music repertoire.

Since then, Pascal Gallet has travelled the world, notably regularly in Brazil – invited this year to the 2016 CIVEBRA International Festival – and in China, pianist selected at the Shanghai Spring Festival as well as at the New Easan Music Festival in Guangxi where he gave a world premiere of several Chinese works for piano. A record at (www.maguelone.fr) came to concretize this collaboration.

In 2016, Pascal Gallet was hired by Sud Radio as musical chronicler for the Tout est classique program.

== Discography ==
- Turina's works for piano
- Grieg's Sonata, scènes de la vie populaire
- André Jolivet's complete works for piano
- Jolivet's Music for piano volume 1
- Jolivet's Music for piano volume 2
- Jolivet's Music for piano volume 3 and live recording of concerto for piano and orchestra
- Jevtić: Album Que le jour est beau (Éric Aubier, Snezana Savicić, Vertige Quintet)
- Chopin's Piano Sonata No. 2, Nocturnes, Scherzo, Polonaises
- Shostakovich's Piano quintet
- Liszt Immortal
- Henri Collet's works for piano
- Classique Cinéma Musiques de films retranscrites pour le piano
- Road to Europe: Chinese piano solo and chamber music works
