= Giovanni Bellucci =

Italian pianist (born 1965)

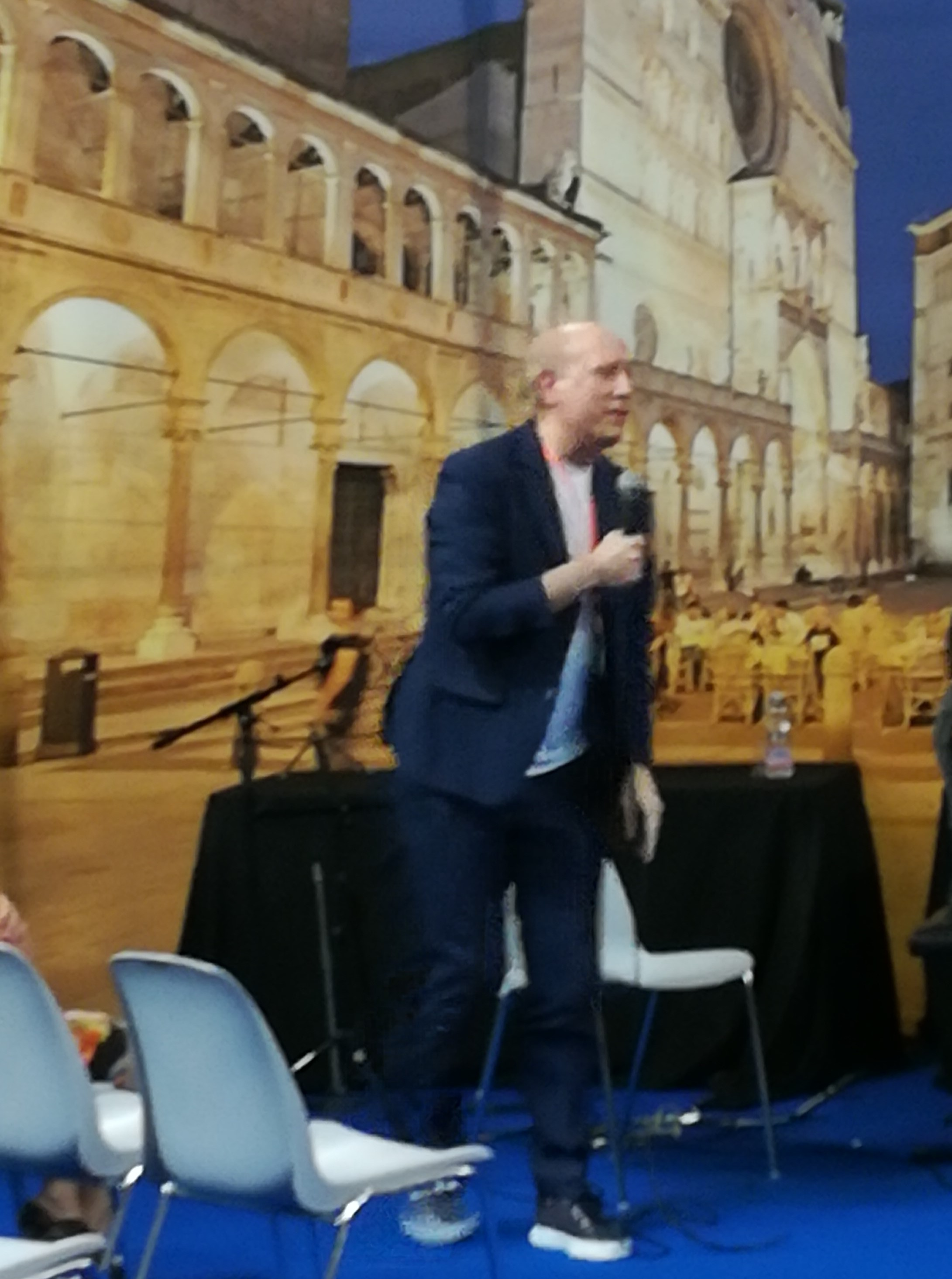
Bellucci in 2018

Giovanni Bellucci (born Rome, 31 August 1965) is an Italian pianist.

After having inadvertently discovered the piano when he was already fourteen, he started studying at the Santa Cecilia Conservatory in Rome under the direction of Franco Medori. After earning his degree "summa cum laude" and with an honourable mention, he was awarded a "Master" at the Accademia Pianistica in Imola. As a result, he could subsequently claim amongst his contacts artists of the stature of Paul Badura-Skoda, Alfred Brendel, Murray Perahia, and Maurizio Pollini.

His recording of Franz Liszt's Paraphrases of Verdi and Bellini operas was included in Diapason magazine's selection of the all-time top 10 Liszt recordings. Apart from Bellucci, the music critic Alain Lompech only took into consideration artists such as Martha Argerich, Claudio Arrau, Aldo Ciccolini, Gyorgy Cziffra, Wilhelm Kempff, and Krystian Zimerman. For the British magazine Gramophone, Bellucci is an artist born into the great Italian tradition and brought up to it – a tradition historically represented by Busoni, Zecchi, Michelangeli, Ciani, Pollini.

"He takes us back to the golden age of the piano", declared the daily Le Monde in highlighting Bellucci's success in the World Piano Masters Competition in Montecarlo 1996 – the last in a lengthy series of successes in international competitions (from the Queen Elisabeth in Brussels to the "Prague Spring", from the RAI "Casella" to the "C. Kahn" in Paris, from the "Busoni" to the "Franz Liszt"). In 2005, he received the award "Recital of the year" after his first concert tour in Australia.

All his CDs, published by Decca, Warner Classics, Accord-Universal, Opus 106, Assai, and Danacord, have been awarded by specialist publications: "Choc de l'année" by the Classical magazine Répertoire and "CHOC" of Le Monde de la musique in France, UK Gramophone's "Editor's choice", "5 Stars" from Musica, "5 stars" from the BBC Music Magazine, "Cd exceptionnel" from Répertoire, "ffff" from Télérama, "Best Cd" from the magazine Suono, etc.

The recording company Universal has published the complete Hungarian Rhapsodies S. 244 by Franz Liszt (with a double CD including a rare work, such as the Romanian Rhapsody S. 242) and the CD Chopin Métamorphoses, where Bellucci played some works as world premiere, like the Concerto No. 1 by Chopin/Tausig and the Polonaise, Op. 53 "Heroic" by Chopin/Busoni.

== Discography ==
- Beethoven: Complete Piano Sonatas Vol. I, 2017, Brilliant Classics
- Franz Liszt: Les 19 Rhapsodies Hongroises – Rhapsodie Roumaine, 2011, Accord Universal
- Chopin Métamorphoses, 2010, Accord Universal
- Olivier Greif: Works, 2010, Accord Universal
- Rarities of Piano Music, from the Husum Festival, Works by Busoni, 2010, Danacord
- Franz Liszt: Paraphrases d'opéras de Bellini e Verdi, 2009, Warner Classics
- Beethoven Klaviersonaten und Symphonien Vol. I, 2009, Warner Classics
- Beethoven Klaviersonaten und Symphonien Vol. II, 2009, Warner Classics
- Beethoven Klaviersonaten und Symphonien Vol. III, 2009, Warner Classics
- 60 years of the International Competition Prague Spring, 2008, Ceski Rozhlas
- Hector Berlioz Symphonie Fantastique Piano transcription by Franz Liszt, 2006, Decca
- Franz Liszt. Oeuvres pour piano et orchestre et pour piano solo, 2006, Accord Universal
- Rarities of Piano Music, from the Husum Festival, Works by Liszt and Gottschalk , 2002, Danacord
- Editor's choice. The 10 best CDs of the month, 2000, Gramophone
- Franz Liszt/Ferruccio Busoni: Fantaisie et fugue Ad nos ad salutarem undam – Beethoven Sonate n. 29 Hammerklavier, 1999, Assai
- Tchaikowski Piano Concerto n.1, 1995, RGIP
- Concorso Opera Prima Philips, 1991, Philips
