= Enesco Quartet =

French string quartet

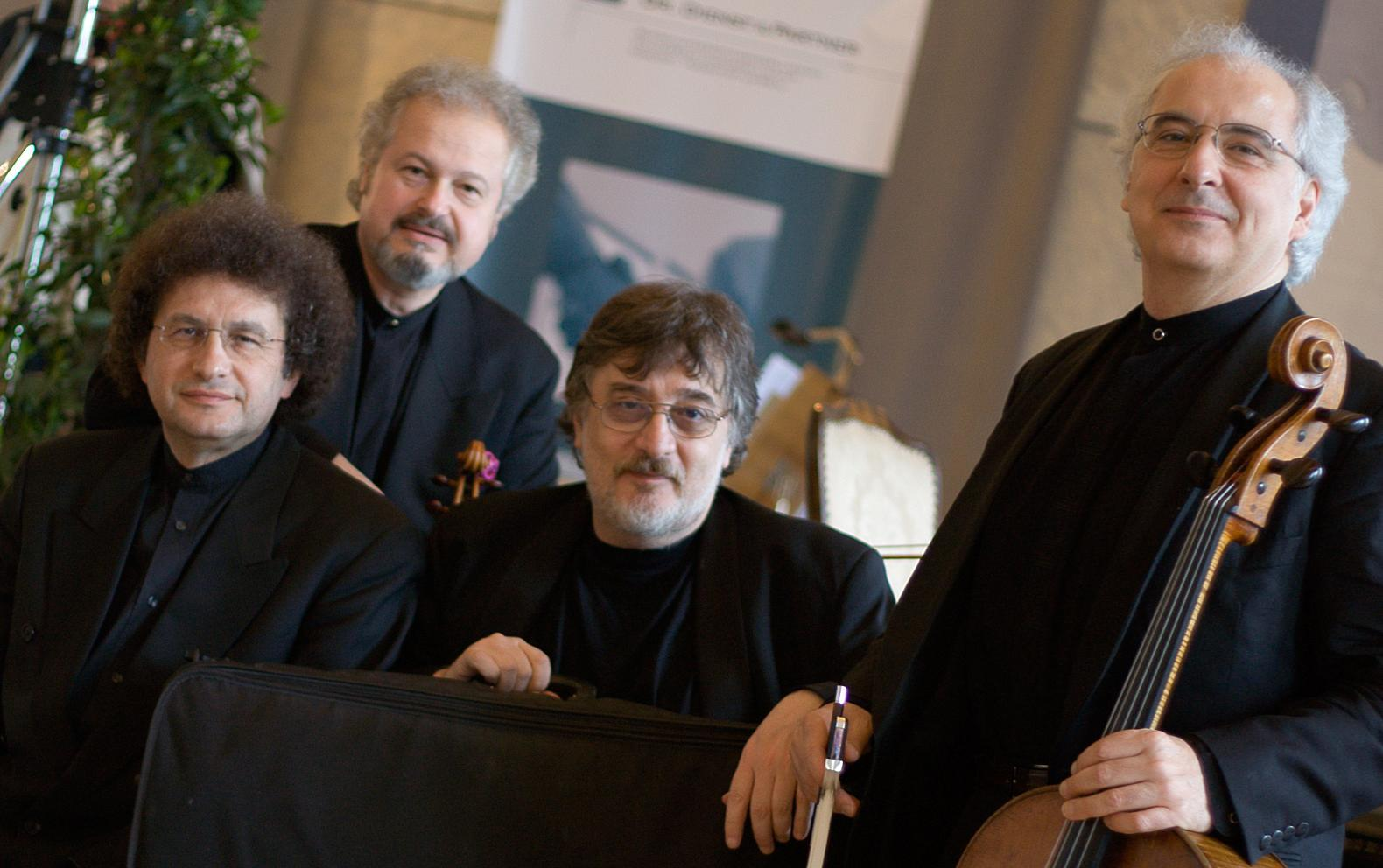
Enesco Quartet

The Enesco Quartet is a French string quartet based in Paris.

== History ==
The Enesco Quartet was formed in 1979. Wishing to honour the memory of the illustrious Georges Enesco (1881-1955), their founders gave his name to the Quartet. Their meeting with the famous musicians Sándor Végh, Norbert Brainin and Sergiu Celibidache was of the utmost importance: the Enesco Quartet established itself internationally from the very beginning of their studies with these great artists with whom they maintained privileged relations.

Their repertoire is distinguished by a very large number of quartets, as well as numerous works ranging from the quintet to the octet, including classical and romantic pages from the 18th, 19th, and 20th century, which occupies an important place in their programmes. They have performed a large number of contemporary works for string quartets composed by Philippe Hersant, Serge Nigg, Henri Sauguet, Jean-Jacques Werner, Pierre-Max Dubois, Nicolas Bacri, Nicolas Philippot, Jesús Guridi, Xavier Montsalvatge, José Peris Lacasa, Carmelo Bernaola, Josep Soler i Sardà and José García Román. Many of them have written works especially for the Enesco Quartet.

They are regularly invited to the main festivals : Besançon International Music Festival, Pablo Casals Festival, Festival de musique de La Chaise-Dieu, Festival de Radio France et Montpellier, Paris, Cannes Santander Granada, Stavelot, Echternach, Kuhmo, Guildford, Bâle, Bucharest and they have played with artists such as Olivier Charlier, Lluís Claret, Jean-Philippe Collard, Patrice Fontanarosa, Youri Egorov, Pascal Gallet, Ivry Gitlis, Michel Lethiec, Roberte Mamou, Paul Meyer, Aurèle Nicolet, Marielle Nordmann, Régis Pasquier, Jean-Pierre Rampal, Mstislav Rostropovich, Michel Strauss, Gabriel Tacchino, Haruko Ueda, Jean-Claude Vanden Eynden, Narciso Yepes, Roland Dyens etc.

The Enesco Quartet has performed in the most prestigious halls in the world, including the Salle Gaveau, the Salle Pleyel and the Théâtre des Champs-Élysées in Paris, the Teatro Real and the National Auditorium of Music in Madrid, the Gulbenkian Foundation in Lisbon, the Royal Concertgebouw in Amsterdam, the Wigmore Hall in London, and the Library of Congress in Washington.

Every year, the Quartet is invited for masterclasses in the most important music venues in France, as well as in Belgium, Spain, Switzerland and Finland.

Their discography includes numerous recordings for French record companies Arion, Pierre Verany, Forlane, Rem, as well as Claves (Spain), Novalis (Switzerland) and CPO (Germany), with works by Schubert, Schumann, Dvořák, Boccherini, Cherubini, Debussy, Ravel, Franck, Chausson, Vierne, Enesco, Janacek, Bartok, Shostakovich, Guridi. For the recording of Franck and Chausson, with the pianist Gabriel Tacchino, they were awarded the Diapason d'Or, and for the CD comprising three quartets of French contemporary music by Nigg, Hersant, and Philippot, they were awarded the Grand Prix de l'Académie française du disque. In Spain, their recording of Guridi's two quartets was voted Best Record of the Year.

Pierre Petit, the famous music critic, in an article in Le Figaro, called them "messengers of poetry", and speaking of their "warmth and virtuosity", he concluded: "decidedly, the Enesco quartet is a very great quartet".

The Enesco Quartet has celebrated its 40 years of artistic activity in 2019.

In the last two seasons, the Quartet has played several concerts at the Royal Palace in Madrid with the quartet of Stradivarius instruments belonging to the Palacio Real, precious instruments that the Enesco Quartet has been playing regularly for 30 years.

In Paris, the Enesco Quartet performed the world premiere of the first quartet by composer Fabrice Gregorutti, followed in March by the CD recording of the work. They then performed the world premiere of the second quartet with soprano, and the third quartet by the same composer.

After concerts and masterclasses in France, they played several concerts in two tours in Germany, as well as participating in the festivals of Koblenz and Osnabrück. In May, they performed "Kuhmo in Paris", and then in July at the Kuhmo Chamber Music Festival in Finland, where they return for the tenth consecutive year. On this occasion, they met the composer Krzysztof Penderecki and performed his second string quartet, as well as Magnus Lindberg's piano quintet, in the presence of the composer.

Last recordings :

After its prestigious Grand Prix du Disque, the quartet continued its recording cycles. Currently, the Quartet has released a Shostakovich record (1st and 7th quartets and the piano quintet), as well as the premiere of the latest quartets by José Peris Lacasa, Postnuclear Winter Scenario by Jacob ter Veldhuis, Tenebrae and Last round by Osvaldo Golijov.

The world premiere performance of Vladimir Mendelssohn's Fantasy for Quartet was a great success in South Korea and Scandinavia.

Projects for 2017 and 2018 included Ravel's quartet in his city of residence (Montfort-l'Amaury), the "Musique et Passions" cycle in Paris, concerts at the Palazzo Contarini Dal Zaffo in Venice, and a day of concerts in Antwerp dedicated to the composer Georges Enesco, including works for quartet, piano quartet and octet.

The Enesco Quartet been invited for the 25th consecutive year in the prestigious chamber music series of the "Ramón Areces Foundation" in Madrid.

== Members ==
=== First violin ===
- Constantin Bogdanas. First Prize at the National Superior Conservatory of Bucharest, Bogdanas moved to Paris in 1979. He was concertmaster of the Orchestre philharmonique de Radio France and later became concertmaster of the Concerts Colonne. First Grand Prize winner of the Paris International Chamber Music Competition, laureate of the Tibor Varga International Competition, he leads a career as a soloist and chamber musician, notably as a founding member of the Enesco Quartet. Professor at the Francis Poulenc Conservatory in Paris and assistant professor at the Conservatoire de Paris, Bogdanas is a member of numerous juries and participates in a large number of master classes in France, the United States, Spain, Belgium, Germany and Finland. With the Enesco Quartet, he is invited to play in the world's greatest concert halls such as Carnegie Hall, Wigmore Hall, Salle Pleyel, Salle Gaveau, Library of Congress... His recordings with the Enesco Quartet have earned him major awards: "Grand Prix du Disque de l'Académie Française du Disque, Diapason d'Or, Choc de la Musique".

=== Second violin ===
- Florin Szigeti Born into a family with a musical tradition, Szigeti brilliantly completed his studies, winning the "First Prize for Violin" and chamber music at the Conservatoire de Paris and the "Grand Prize of the National Violin Competition" in Bucharest. Szigeti is a founding member of the prestigious "Enesco Quartet" with which he settled in France in 1979. With the quartet, he won the Premier Grand Prix of the Concours International de Musique de chambre de Paris, and the Grand Prix du Disque de l'Académie Française du Disque followed by several Diapasons d'Or and Chocs de la Musique for the recordings with the Enesco Quartet. He is regularly invited with the Quartet to play in the most important festivals and on the most prestigious stages around the world. Szigeti teaches violin at the Conservatoire à rayonnement régional de Paris (CRR) and at the Conservatoire de Paris (CNSM), thus combining a rich artistic and educational career. Recitals and concerts as a soloist, four decades as the concertmaster of several chamber and philharmonic orchestras, and more than two thousand quartet concerts mark Florin Szigeti's musical career. A highly recognised teacher, Szigeti is regularly invited to give violin and chamber music juries and master classes in the most important music centres in France, Germany, Belgium, Spain and Finland, in the company of the greatest names in music.

=== Alto ===
Vladimir Mendelssohn was born into a family with a long musical tradition in Romania, and studied viola and composition in Bucharest. He is very much in demand as a chamber musician, and he regularly plays in many international festivals with the biggest names in music. With the Enesco Quartet, he is invited to play all over the world, on the most prestigious stages. He has also given solo concerts and made numerous recordings for various record companies. Mendelssohn is a prolific composer, writing works for solo instruments, mixed choir, chamber and symphony orchestras. He has also written chamber music, ballet, incidental music, and film music. He is currently professor of chamber music at the Conservatoire de Paris, and also teaches in The Hague, Essen and Bologna, and regularly gives master classes all over the world. Since autumn 2005, Mendelssohn has been the artistic director of the Kuhmo Chamber Music Festival in Finland.

Dan Iarca is one of the founding members of the Athenaeum Enesco Quartet. He was a member of this ensemble from its creation in 1979 to 1980 and from 1989 to 2002, the year of his death.

Liviu Stanese was a member of the Enesco Quartet from March 1981 to February 1989.

=== Violoncello ===
- Dorel Fodoreanu is First Prize of the National Superior Conservatory of Music in Bucharest. He was principal cello in the Georges Enesco Philharmonic Orchestra. He continued his career as a soloist, having at the same time a rich chamber music activity. A founding member of the Enesco Quartet, he moved to Paris in 1979. Fodoreanu was one of the first artists of Romanian origin to be invited as a soloist by the Georges Enesco Philharmonic Orchestra after the Romanian Revolution. First Prize at the Paris Chamber Music Competition and Grand Prix du Disque of the Académie Française du Disque with the Enesco Quartet. He was also awarded the Mihail Jora Prize in 1990. Fodoreanu has been invited for concerts and master classes by the University of Central Florida (Orlando), the Fletcher Foundation of Durham (North Carolina), in Great Britain, Palacio Real in Madrid and at the request of the Government of Aragon, in Albaracin, Alcaniz and Burgos. He has played as principal cello in the Barcelona Orchestra and the Arturo Toscanini Filarmonica of Parma. Fodoreanu is a regular guest on international juries: Paris, St. Petersburg (Tchaikovsky Junior), the Conservatories of Pari, Lyon, and Marseille.

== Recordings ==
- César Franck: Quintet for piano & strings; Ernest Chausson: Quartet Op. 35 Inachevé - Gabriel Tacchino, piano (Arion / Pierre Verany PV 792032) — Diapason d'Or
- Antonín Dvořák: Quintet for piano & strings, Op. 81; Quartet Op. 96 "American" - Gabriel Tacchino, piano (Arion / Pierre Verany PV 795011)
- Robert Schumann: Quintet for piano op.44; Quartet Op. 41 N 1 - Gabriel Tacchino, piano (Arion / Pierre Verany PV 797081)
- Louis Vierne: Quintet with piano Op. 42; String Quartet Op. 12 - Gabriel Tacchino, piano (Arion / Pierre Verany PV 700011)
- Franz Schubert: Quartet D.810 (posthumous opus) Death and the Maiden; Quartet D703 (posthumous opus) Quartettsatz (Forlane 16764)
- Béla Bartók: Quartet N 4, Quartet N 6 (Arion / Pierre Verany PV 799022)
- Georges Enesco: Quartet Op. 22 N 1 and 2 (CPO LC.8492)
- Dmitri Shostakovich: Quartet N 1 op.49, Quartet N 7, Op. 108, Piano Quintet Op. 53 (Pascal Gallet piano (Fontmorigny 0602)
- Claude Debussy: Quartet Op. 10; Maurice Ravel: Quartet in F (Forlane UCD 16521
- Leoš Janáček, Quartet n° 2 "Lettres intimes"; Enesco: Quartet Op. 22 N 2, Antonín Dvořák, Quatuor Op. 96 "American" (Forlane UCD 16538)
- Boccherini: Quintets with flute; Joseph Martin Kraus : Quintet with flute (Aurèle Nicolet, flute) (Novalis 150082-2)
- Serge Nigg: Quartet; Michel Philippot, Quartet N 2; Philippe Hersant, Quartet N 1 (REM) — Grand prix du disque
- Max d'Ollone: Piano Trio in A minor, Piano Quartet in E minor, Quartet in D major (Arion/Pierre Verany PV 799061)
- Jesús Guridi: Quartet N 1, N 2 (June 1986, Ensayo ENY-CD-3450) OCLC 53207220
- Antonio Soler: Quartet N 3; Martinez: Quartet N. 1, N. 2; Roger: Blanca Quartet (Ensayo ENY-CD-2206)
- Charles Chaynes: String Quartet (Musique Française d’Aujourd’hui series, Radio-France/MFA 216024)
- Roland Dyens: Variations sur cinq thèmes de Georges Brassens pour guitare et quatuor à cordes (Auvidis AV 4731).
