= François Weigel =

French pianist, conductor and composer

- Born: 1964 (age 61–62); Trier, West Germany
- Education: Hochschule für Musik und Tanz Köln; Conservatoire National Supérieur de Musique de Paris (CNSM); Ecole Normale de Musique de Paris – Alfred Cortot (ENM)
- Occupations: Pianist, composer, conductor
- Website: francoisweigel.com

François Weigel (born 1964, Trier, West Germany) is a French pianist, conductor and composer.

== Biography ==
François Weigel began piano lessons at the age four with a former student of Alfred Cortot in Trier, Germany, where he spend his childhood. By age twelve, he was playing the organ and performing concertos with orchestras, as well as conducting a choir that performed his own compositions.

In 1979, at fifteen, he gained admission to the Hochschule für Musik und Tanz Köln to study composition, entering via a competitive audition with a special waiver. The following year, he was accepted into Yvonne Loriod's class at the Conservatoire National Supérieur de Musique de Paris, where he won several first prizes in piano, chamber music, analysis and orchestration (while simultaneous studying for his baccalaureate as an independent candidate). He subsequently honed his skills under Alexis Weissenberg. and later studied orchestral conducting at the École Normale de Musique de Paris

During a 1989 recital at the Salle Gaveau in Paris, he caught the attention of the impresario Michel Glotz who signed him to his agency (Musicaglotz) the day after the concert.

== Solo career ==
He has appeared as soloist with the Hamburg Philharmonic Orchestra, the Saint Petersburg Philharmonic Orchestra, the Warsaw Philharmonic Orchestra, the Polish National Radio Symphony Orchestra, the Serbian National Radio Orchestra, the Estonian National Symphony Orchestra, the Belgrade Philharmonic Orchestra, the Sofia Philharmonic Orchestra, the Orchestre philharmonique de Radio France, the Orchestre national de Lille, the Orchestre national d'Île-de-France, the Orchestre National de Lorraine, the Montpellier Opera Orchestra, the Nouvel Orchestre de Saint-Etienne, the Mulhouse Symphony Orchestra, the Orchestre de la Suisse Romande, the Ankara Bilkent Symphony Orchestra, the Cairo Symphony Orchestra, the Mexico National University Philharmonic Orchestra.

He has given recitals in Vienna, Salzburg, Graz, Klagenfurt, Eisenstadt, Bonn, Brussels, Geneva, Oslo, Bergen, Stavanger, Riga, Ljubljana, Verona, Fort Worth, Buenos Aires, Avignon's Opera (broadcast on France Musique). Around thirty recitals in Paris - Salle Gaveau (where he performed the complete Études by Chopin, the complete Hungarian Rhapsodies by Liszt, the complete Suites by Bach), the Théâtre du Châtelet, the Salle Pleyel, the Musée d'Orsay and the Musée du Louvre (concerts broadcast on Radio Classique). About ten recitals at the Théâtre Impérial de Compiègne, and performances at international festivals including La Roque d'Anthéron (recorded by France Musique), The Flâneries musicales de Reims (in which he participated for over fifteen years, performing 33 different programs), the Stresa Festival, Ravello, Mexico City (Sala Nezahualcóyotl), Evian (La Grange au Lac), the Radio France Montpellier Festival (Le Corum) broadcast on France Musique.

François Weigel has collaborated with conductors Nicolai Alexeev, Gisèle Ben-Dor, Roger Boutry, Peter Burian, Enrique Diemecke, Patrick Fournillier, Marek Janowski, Daniel Klajner, Jacques Mercier, Ingo Metzmacher, Marc Piollet, Paul Polivnick, Carlos Miguel Prieto, Pinchas Steinberg, Emil Tabakov, Antoni Wit.

== Conducting ==
He has conducting the Bilkent Symphony Orchestra, the Bratislava Chamber Orchestra, the Lithuanian Chamber Orchestra, the Zagreb Chamber Orchestra for which he transcribed all of Franz Liszt's concertante works for piano and string orchestra. He founded the Romantic Chamber Orchestra in Paris which specializes in a Viennese repertoire comprising Hungarian Rhapsodies and Csárdas. His achievements include the transcription, adaptation and translation of over under works for choir ans orchestra intended for high school students.

He served as vocal coach for the Paris Bastille Opera choruses on productions of Olivier Messiaen's Saint François d'Assise, Kaija Saariaho's Adriana Mater, as well as on major works from the German repertoire : Alban Berg's Wozzeck, Richard Wagner's Tannhäuser, Richard Strauss's Die Frau ohne Schatten.

== Chamber Music ==
His chamber music partners have included the Belvedere Trio (comprising members of the Vienna Philharmonic), the Amarcord Quartet (Berlin Philharmonic), the Manfred Quartet (first-prize winner at the Banff and Evian international competitions), the Bernède Quartet (an ensemble that recorded with Samson François, violinists James Ehnes, Shunsuke Sato, and Sacha Rozhdestvensky, violists Toby Hoffman, and Vladimir Mendelssohn (a member of the Enesco Quartet), cellists Jean Ferry (Paris National Opera Orchestra), and Robert Nagy (Vienna Philharmonic), clarinetists Jean-Marc Fessard, Pierre Génisson, and Florent Héau, rare instrument player Thomas Bloch, American pianist Frederic Chiu, and jazz pianist Pierre de Bethmann in improvisation duo.

In 1993, he founded the Strauss Quartet with Jacques Saint-Yves, Françoise Gneri, and Jean Ferry (members of the Paris Opera Orchestra), which performed at the Théâtre du Châtelet and for Radio France.

As part of the CIC's corporate sponsorship program, Renaud Capuçon asked him in 2017 to mentor a young string quartet. composed of students from the CNSM for the Aix-en-Provence Easter Festival

== Lyrical Accompaniment ==
Many opera singers have engaged him to accompany them in recitals including Julie Fuchs, Katarina Jovanovic (Opéra de Toulon, Opéra de Nice, Opéra de Marseille), Magali Léger (Flâneries de Reims), Nathalie Manfrino (Palais des Congrès de Dijon), Inva Mula (Opéra de Paris, Salle Gaveau, France Inter), Albane Carrère (France Télévision), Sophie Koch (Flâneries de Reims), Clémentine Margaine, Qiulin Zhang (Opéra de Tours), Laurence Dale (Salle Gaveau, Opéra de Marseille, France Musique, Opéra de Montpellier, Buenos Aire Museum), Mark Milhofer (Opéra de Nice), Alexandre Duhamel, Manfred Hemm (France Musique, Martin Snell (France Television), Florian Sempey (Opéra de Nice), Ferruccio Furlanetto (Stresa International Festival).

In 2010, Patrick de Carolis, the CEO of France Television, enlisted his services for the filming of Le Grand Tour featuring Ruggero Raimondi. This marks the beginning of a long-standing collaboration with the internationally renowned baritone Salle Gaveau, Opéra de Monaco, Radio Classique, France Television.

== Recordings and Broadcasts ==
Many recitals have been broadcast live on France Musique : Festival de La Roque-d'Anthéron, Opéra d'Avignon, Festival Radio France Occitanie Montpellier, Maison de Radio France on Radio Classique : Louvre Museum, Orsay Museum.

His recording of Olivier Messiaen' Turangalîla-Symphonie with the Polish National Radio Symphony Orchestra (for the Naxos label) has been broadcast repeatedly by national stations such as Deutschlandfunk, Deutsche Welle, Polskie Radio, and Radio France.

In other media, Weigel began a collaboration in 2010 with the journalist and writer Alain Duault for concerts in the French operas presenting the movies On the Steps of the Great Composers, and Musical Promenades in European Music Cities. He appears regularly on radio and television programmes across Europe, such as Le Fou du Roi with Stéphane Bern, Carrefour de Lodéon with Frédéric Lodéon on France Inter, Fauteuils d'Orchestre with Anne Sinclair, Le Monde est à Vous with Jacques Martin on Antenne 2, Le Grand Tour with Patrick de Carolis on France Télévisions.

== Quotes ==
- "François Weigel at the Salle Gaveau : a wonderful, consummate artist - pianist, composer, and conductor all in one. Irresistible." - Le Figaro (January 23, 2008)
- "Velvety playing, exquisite sensitivity, a touch that speaks to the soul..." - Ouest-France (November 12, 1999)
- "A splendi soloist, as technically secure and musically accomplished as any. An incredible delight" - BBC Music Magazine, (December 2000)

== Awards and Distinctions ==
- 1985: First Prize of the Conservatoire national supérieur de musique de Paris - CNSM
- 1992 : Yehudi Menuhin Foundation Prize Winner
- 1998 : Yves Saint-Laurent Foundation Prize Winner
- 2002 : Midem Classical Music Award
- 2009 : Sacem member
- 2006 : French Ordre des Palmes académiques

== Recordings ==
- Olivier Messiaen : Turangalîla-Symphonie with the Polish National Radio Symphony Orchestra(8.554478-79)
- Naxos Classical Heat 2002 (Naxos 8.520102 - 0730099121026)
- Hans Werner Henze : original soundtrack to the film Swann in Love by Volker Schlöndorff (Label Mila - A240)

== Film and Theatre ==
- Swann in Love (1984) : a film by Volker Schlöndorff, starring Ornella Muti, Jeremy Irons, Alain Delon
- Film score for Olivier Meyrou's film about the hearing-impaired community
- Aristophane : The Birds at the Théâtre du Rond-Point, starring Jean-Louis Barrault
- Les Briques Rouges de Varsovie by Robert Badinter starring Charles Berling
