= Louis Dandrel =

French sound designer and musician (1939–2021)

- Born: 11 January 1939; Nogent-le-Rotrou, France
- Died: 22 January 2021 (aged 82)
- Occupations: Sound Designer; Musician

Louis Dandrel (11 January 1939 – 22 January 2021) was a French sound designer, composer, musician, and journalist. He was in charge of the sound design unit at IRCAM, as well as the studio he created, Diasonic. He was the husband of Fabienne Pascaud, who was managing editor at Télérama.

== Biography ==
Dandrel studied music at the Conservatoire de Paris and literary studies at Sorbonne University. He worked as a journalist and musical critic for Le Monde from 1965 to 1980, then became director of France Musique. He was one of the founders of Le Monde de la musique and Radio Classique. In 1980, he opened a sound design studio that would later become incorporated into IRCAM.

Dandrel composed many musical works which he called "gardens", such as the "Jardin des voix" in Osaka, the "Jardin des sons" in Hong Kong, and "La Clepsydre" in Paris. He designed Le Métaphone in Oignies. He created sound scenography exhibitions for the SNCF from 1994 to 2004. He organized a "tv shots" exhibition at the Passage du Désir in November 2008 using photographs taken by Harry Gruyaert. From 2009 to 2013, he worked on sensory design for the Tours tramway alongside Daniel Buren and Roger Tallon.

Louis Dandrel died on 22 January 2021 at the age of 82.
