= Roger Muraro =

French classical pianist (born 1959)

Roger César Muraro (born 13 May 1959) is a French classical pianist, known especially for his recordings of the music of Olivier Messiaen.

== Career ==
Muraro was born in Lyon, France, in 1959, to parents who came from the Veneto region of Northeast Italy.

He grew up in a village in the Lyon region. Because there was no place for him in the local football club, his parents enrolled him in the local band, where he learned the saxophone. He entered the Conservatoire de Lyon at the age of 11, initially studying the saxophone. He began to teach himself the piano, and when this came to the attention of his saxophone professor, the latter enrolled him in the piano classes of Suzy Bossard.

At 17, Muraro auditioned to enter the Paris Conservatoire. Although unsuccessful, he caught the attention of Yvonne Loriod, wife and privileged interpreter of the composer Olivier Messiaen. He joined her class in 1978. He obtained first prizes in chamber music in 1980 and in piano in 1981, and was a saxophone teacher at the music school of Mâcon in the early '80s.

Muraro also studied with Éliane Richepin, who helped him prepare for the Tchaikovsky Competition, where he took fourth prize in 1986. He was awarded Victoire de la Musique in the category of instrumental soloist.

== Repertoire and recordings ==
Muraro achieved early recognition as an interpreter of Messiaen's piano works. Messiaen congratulated him personally after a performance of Vingt Regards sur l'Enfant-Jesus, praising «sa technique éblouissante, sa maîtrise, ses qualités sonores, son émotion, et j’oserai dire sa Foi !… » ("his dazzling technique, his mastery, the quality of his tone, his emotion and, I would dare to say, his faith"). He went on to record Messiaen's complete piano works. These recordings received numerous critics' awards, including a Diapason d'Or and the highest critical ratings from Le Monde de la musique and Telérama.

Muraro has also recorded the complete piano works of Ravel. These were among the many works plagiarised and issued under the name of Joyce Hatto. Reviewing them in these plagiarised recordings, Jed Distler wrote "Time and again an unusually turned phrase, unexpected accent, or seemingly strange voicing sent me running to the score, only to discover that the alleged transgressions in fact correspond to Ravel's markings. And without violating the letter, Hatto somehow always manages to leave a fresh, individual imprint upon everything she touches."

Muraro continues to record and give concerts around the world.

== Sources ==
- Muraro's website
- Muraro's biography on Caecilia
