= Goldberg Magazine =

- Executive Editor: Javier Rozas Ado
- Categories: Early Music
- Frequency: bimonthly (6 issues per year)
- Publisher: Goldberg Ediciones S.L; Goldberg Publications Ltd.
- First issue: 1997
- Final issue: November 2008
- Country: Spain
- Language: English, French, Spanish
- ISSN: 1138-1531
- OCLC: 750481690

Goldberg Magazine was a Spanish-based bimonthly magazine devoted to early music and Baroque music.

== History and profile ==
Goldberg Magazine was started in 1997. The magazine was initially published in bilingual English/Spanish and English/French versions. Starting September 2003, the magazine published three separate editions in English, French and Spanish and in 2004 it went from four to six issues per year.

Goldberg Magazine launched a website called GoldbergWeb.com -- "the early-music portal"—to diversify communication channels for lovers of early music.

On 21 November 2008 Goldberg Ediciones announced that it was suspending publication of the magazine due to financial difficulties. Then it folded on the same date. The website was also shut down.

== See also ==
- List of magazines in Spain
- Roger Tellart (1932–2013), French musicologist, occasional contributor to the magazine
