= Jonathan Darlington =

British conductor (born 1956)

Jonathan Philip Darlington (born 1956 in Lapworth, England) is a British conductor, music director emeritus of the Vancouver Opera and the former music director of the Duisburg Philharmonic Orchestra. He is known for his broad repertoire of both opera and symphonic music and appears regularly with major orchestras and opera houses, most notably the Paris Opera, Vienna State Opera, Frankfurt Oper, Orchestre National de France, Prague Radio Symphony Orchestra, the Swedish Chamber Orchestra, Orchestra Sinfonica del San Carlo di Napoli, the Orchestre Philharmonique de Strasbourg, the National Orchestra of Taiwan, the BBC Symphony Orchestra, English National Opera and Opera Australia.

== Education and early career ==
Jonathan Darlington was educated at The King's School, Worcester. He graduated in 1978 with a music degree from Durham University, where he was a member of Hatfield College. He subsequently studied at the Royal Academy of Music. Early in his career he had worked with Pierre Boulez, Riccardo Muti and Olivier Messiaen. He made his conducting debut in 1984 at the Théâtre des Champs Elysées in Paris with Francesco Cavalli's Ormindo. In 1991 he was appointed deputy to the music director Myung-Whun Chung at the Opéra de la Bastille in Paris, where he made his house debut with Le nozze di Figaro. He is the brother of conductor CBE Stephen Darlington.

== Career ==
From 2002 to 2011, Darlington was Generalmusikdirektor of the Duisburg Philharmonic. Until 2018, he was musical director at the Vancouver Opera in Canada. In 2022, Darlington was presented as new Generalmusikdirektor of the Nuremberg Symphony Orchestra and received a contract for five years.

== Recent performances ==
Recent performances include Verdi's Otello (January 2020), Puccini's Madama Butterfly (October 2019), Rossini's L'Elisir d'Amore and Verdi's Don Carlos (September 2019) at the Vienna State Opera, Gounod's Faust at Vancouver Opera (May 2019), Puccini's La Bohème at the Royal Swedish Opera in Stockholm (February 2019) and Beethoven's Fidelio. at the Semperoper Dresden (October 2018).

In 2008 he led the world premiere of Manfred Trojahn's La Grande Magia with the Staatskapelle Dresden (May 2008).

Thanks to his background as a harpsichordist, he also has considerable experiences conducting historically informed performances of Mozart, Rossini, Cavalli's L'Ormindo), Tritto (Il Convitato di Pietra o Don Giovanni) and Gustave Charpentier's Louise with the Deutsche Oper am Rhein and the Duisburg Philharmonic (October 2008),

He appeared as a guest conductor with the Orchestre de Paris, the Strasbourg Philharmonic, the Philharmonisches Orchester Freiburg, the Nürnberger Symphoniker, the Duisburg Philharmonic and the Berlin Konzerthaus Orchestra. As well as the Orchestra of the 18th Century.

In the near future, Jonathan Darlington will conduct Offenbach's Grande Duchesse Gerolstein at the Dresden Semperoper, Henze's Prinz von Homburg at the Frankfurt Oper and Die Fledermaus at the Staatsoper Hamburg.

== Awards ==
Darlington was appointed a Chevalier des Arts et des Lettres as well as Fellow (FRAM) of the Royal Academy of Music, London.

- 2010 Echo Klassik

== Recordings ==
=== Discography ===
With the Orchestre National de France:

- Guillaume Connesson: Athanor, Supernova. Orchestre National de France; Radio France Chorus; Virginie Pesch, soprano; Nigel Smith, baritone; Jonathan Darlington, Muhai Tang, conductors. Radio France/ Naïve, 2004 (2007).

With the Luxembourg Philharmonic Orchestra:

- Poulenc: Les Animaux Modèles, Sinfonietta. Luxembourg Philharmonic Orchestra; Jonathan Darlington, conductor. Timpani, 1998 (2008).

With the Duisburg Philharmonic Orchestra:

- Arnold Schoenberg/ Gabriel Fauré: Pélleas et Mélisande. Duisburg Philharmonic Orchestra; Jonathan Darlington, conductor. Acousence, 2009.
- Antonín Dvořák: Concerto for Piano and Orchestra G minor. Duisburg Philharmonic Orchestra; Boris Bloch, Piano; Jonathan Darlington, conductor. Acousence, 2009.
- Gustav Mahler: Symphonie Nr. 6. Duisburg Philharmonic Orchestra, Jonathan Darlington, conductor. Acousence, 2008.
- Jazz at the Philharmonic. Duisburg Philharmonic Orchestra; Jonathan Darlington conductor; Andy Miles, clarinet. Telos, 2008.
- André Jolivet: Concert for Piano and Orchestra; Maurice Ravel / Marius Constant: Gaspard de la Nuit; Claude Debussy / Bernardo Molinari: L’isle joyeuse. Duisburg Philharmonic Orchestra; Pascal Gallet, piano; Jonathan Darlington, conductor. Acousence, 2008.
- Dmitry Shostakovitch: Symphony A major op.141; Wolfgang Amadeus Mozart: Haffner-Sinfonie Nr. 35 D major KV 385. Duisburg Philharmonic Orchestra; Jonathan Darlington conductor. Acousence, 2007.
- Wagner-Gala der RuhrTriennale 2004. Duisburg Philharmonic Orchestra; Petra-Maria Schnitzer, soprano; Peter Seiffert, tenor; Jonathan Darlington, conductor. WDR/ Oehms Classics, 2004.
- Hector Berlioz: Ouverture Benvenuto Cellini; Mauricio Kagel: Broken Chords; Béla Bartók: Concert for Orchestra. Confido, 2003.

=== Videography ===
- Piotr Ilyitch Tchaikovski: Le Lac des Cygnes. Marie-Claude Pietragalla, Patrick Dupond, Ballet de l’ Opèra National de Paris, Orchestre National de Paris, Jonathan Darlington. NVC Arts, 1992.(Released on DVD in 2005, Bel Air Classiques)

== Sources ==
- IMG Artists, Biography of Jonathan Darlington
- Vancouver Opera, Biography of Jonathan Darlington
