= Swann in Love (film) =

1984 film by Volker Schlöndorff

- French theatrical release poster
- Directed by: Volker Schlöndorff
- Screenplay by: Peter Brook; Jean-Claude Carrière; Marie-Hélène Estienne; Volker Schlöndorff
- Based on: Swann's Way; 1913 novel by Marcel Proust
- Produced by: Eberhard Junkersdorf; Margaret Ménégoz
- Starring: Alain Delon; Jeremy Irons; Ornella Muti; Fanny Ardant
- Cinematography: Sven Nykvist
- Edited by: Françoise Bonnot
- Music by: Hans Werner Henze; David Graham; Gerd Kühr; Marcel Wengler
- Distributed by: Gaumont Distribution
- Release date: 1984
- Running time: 111 minutes
- Countries: France; West Germany
- Languages: French; English; German
- Box office: $6.1 million

Swann in Love (French: Un amour de Swann, German: Eine Liebe von Swann) is a 1984 Franco-German film directed by Volker Schlöndorff. It is based on Marcel Proust's seven-volume novel sequence In Search of Lost Time, specifically a self-contained section of the first volume, the title of which typically translates as Swann's Way (1913). It was nominated for 2 BAFTA Film Awards.

== Plot ==
The film's story follows an original treatment of Proust's story by theater and film director Peter Brook, who was originally going to make the movie, setting it as a day in the life of the aging and ill Charles Swann (Jeremy Irons), who looks back on his past life in flashbacks.

The young Swann is an idly wealthy eligible bachelor in the best circles of Belle Époque Paris, although he is still regarded as something of a social outsider because of his Jewish background. He has been having an affair with the Duchess de Guermantes (Fanny Ardant), but he soon becomes intrigued and then obsessed by the young courtesan Odette de Crécy (Ornella Muti).

Swann's interest in Odette is at first encouraged by Madame Verdurin (Marie-Christine Barrault), a hostess who oversees a tightly-knit, exclusive, and decadent social circle. His friend, the overtly gay Baron de Charlus (Alain Delon), helps to arrange for Swann and Odette to meet. Swann's obsessive love for Odette, however, threatens Madame Verdurin's control, so she arranges other assignations for the courtesan, inflaming Swann's jealousy. Even though Swann declares himself to believe in a kind of spiritual egalitarianism, his interest in Odette is also aesthetic, as shown in references to a copy he owns of a fresco by Botticelli and his comparisons of Odette to the painting's figure, the Biblical character Zipporah. Odette, on the other hand, considers herself free to socialise and sleep where she pleases, leading Swann to visit a prostitute who might have information about whether Odette sleeps with other women as well as men.

Odette does come to contemplate and then suggest marriage to Swann, not so much to "save" her from present life as to insure her future. The Duchess de Guermantes and her husband warn Swann that he and Odette can never be received in upper-class society again if he goes through with the marriage, but as the scene returns to the present, now a mechanized and modernized scene unlike the dreamlike milieu of the past. We see Swann again as an older man and Odette as his wife. Swann's passion has cooled, but he does not seem to reject his choices, even as he faces death soon.

== Background ==
Director Volker Schlöndorff commented later about Proust's Swann in Love as follows:

I must have been sixteen or seventeen, [...] I devoured "Un amour de Swann" in one weekend, lying appropriately under the apple trees in the garden of my boarding school. [...] Proust revealed three worlds to me: the French language, the corresponding society and the unknown regions of love and jealousy. [...] At the time, I, like Charles Swann, had only one desire: to become assimilated in France. [...] When I was offered "Un amour de Swann", I didn't hesitate for a second. I accepted without reading the book again. [...] I saw images in my mind's eye: a man wandering at night across the boulevards, from one bar to the next, in a feverish state of euphoria, searching for a woman who constantly eludes him. He knocks late at night on a window which is not hers. One afternoon, he subjects her to a long session of questioning, he tortures her with his jealousy and takes enjoyment in his own suffering. Odette and Paris: a woman, larger than life, and a city, the epitome of all cities, as well as the man who tries to possess them both - that for me is "Un amour de Swann".

== Cast ==
- Jeremy Irons as Charles Swann
- Ornella Muti as Odette de Crécy
- Alain Delon as Palamède de Guermantes, Baron de Charlus
- Fanny Ardant as Duchesse de Guermantes
- Marie-Christine Barrault as Madame Verdurin
- Anne Bennent as Chloé
- Nathalie Juvet as Madame Cottard
- Philippine Pascal as Madame Gallardon
- Charlotte de Turckheim as Madame de Cambremer
- Jean-François Balmer as Dr. Cottard
- Jacques Boudet as Duke de Guermantes
- Nicolas Baby as the young Jew
- Charlotte Kerr as sous-maîtresse
- Catherine Lachens as la tante
- Jean-Pierre Coffe as Aimé
- Jean-Louis Richard as Monsieur Verdurin
- Bruno Thost as Saniette
- Geoffroy Tory as Forcheville
- Roland Topor as Biche
- Vincent Martin as Remi
- Arc Adrian as Swann's Valet
- Pierre Celeyron as Valet Pif
- Romain Brémond as Protocole Guermantes
- Véronique Dietschy as Madame Vinteuil
- Ivry Gitlis violinist
- François Weigel pianist
- Catherine Jacob

== Reception ==
=== Critical reception ===
Roger Ebert gave the film a positive review and wrote that "Jeremy Irons is perfect as Charles Swann, pale, deep-eyed, feverish with passion." Other critics tended to praise the film's period detail and other technical aspects, but complained that the film did not—and possibly could not—do justice to Proust's literary work. Vincent Canby in the New York Times, for example, remarked that "I suspect that it's not even interesting enough to persuade people to search out the original. If you haven't read Remembrance of Things Past, it doesn't make a great deal of sense, but, if you have, it doesn't make enough."

=== Awards ===
- Nominee Best Costume Design - BAFTA (Yvonne Sassinot de Nesle)
- Nominee Best Foreign Language Film - BAFTA (Volker Schlöndorff, Magaret Menegoz)
- Winner Best Production Design - Cesar Awards (Jacques Saulnier)
- Winner Best Costume Design - Cesar Awards (Yvonne Sassinot de Nesle)
