= Paul Scheinpflug =

German conductor and composer

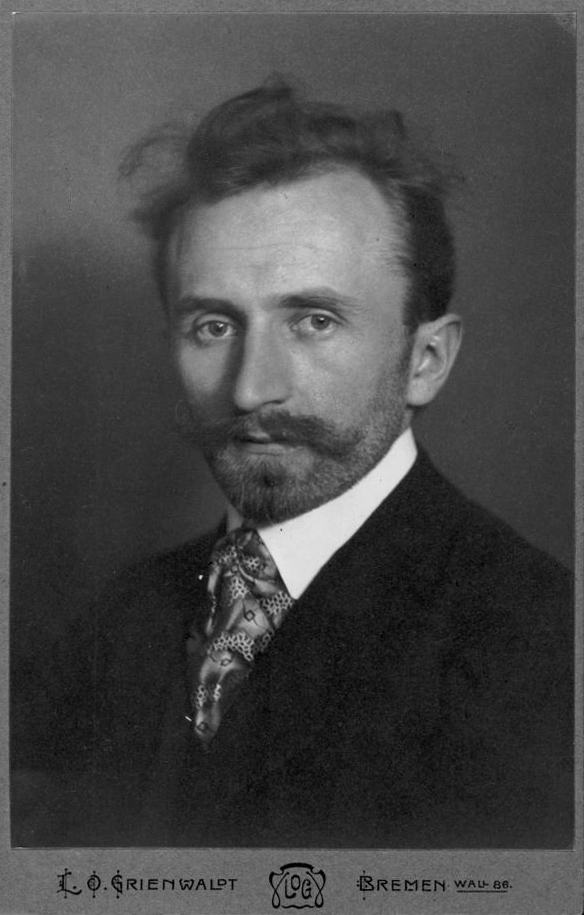
Paul Scheinpflug

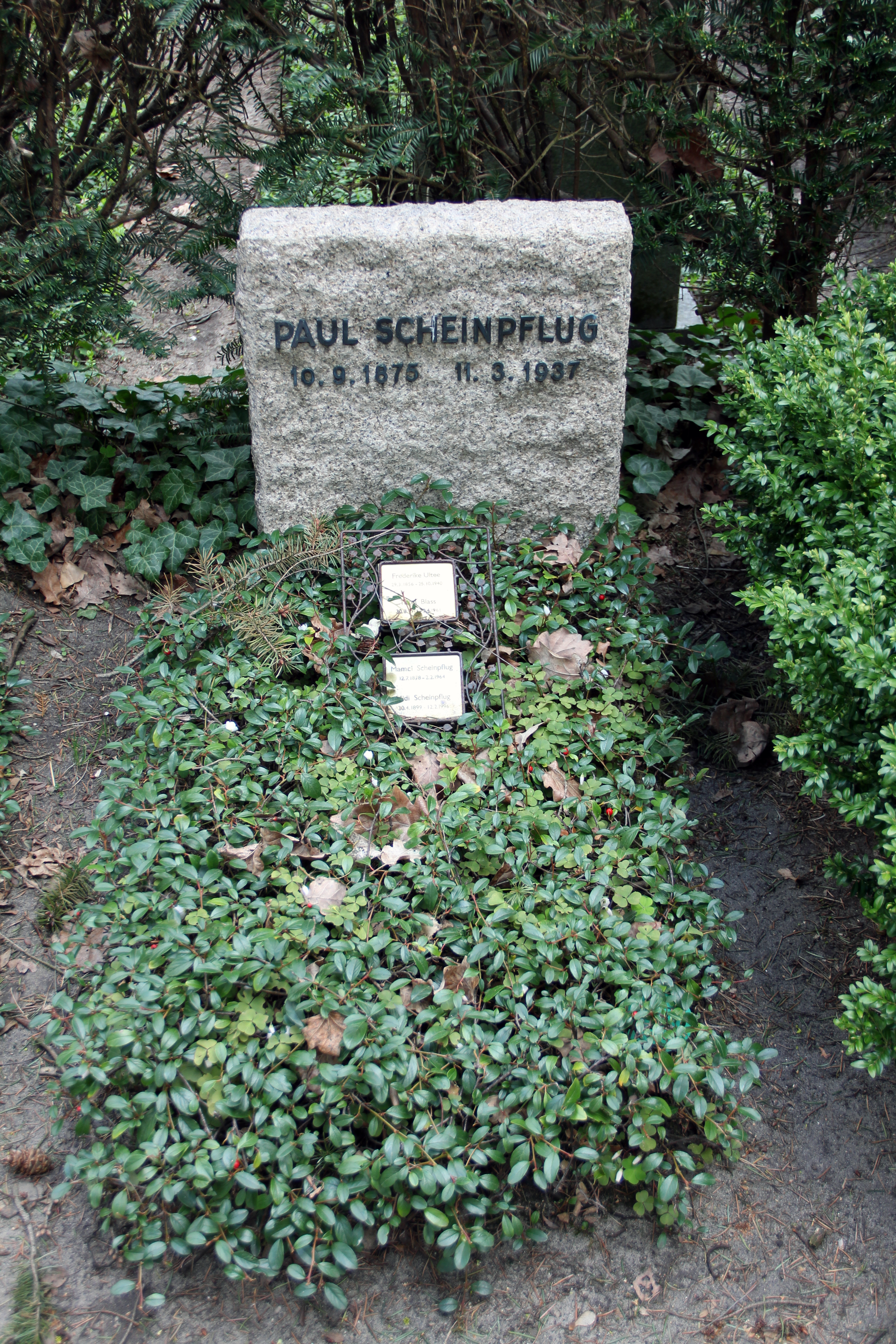
Paul Scheinpflug's grave at the Friedhof Heerstraße in Berlin-Westend

Paul Scheinpflug (10 September 1875 near Dresden – 11 March 1937) was a German conductor and composer.

Born in Loschwitz, Scheinpflug studied at the Hochschule für Musik Carl Maria von Weber Dresden from 1890 to 1894, among others with Felix Draeseke. After a short stay in 1897/1898 as a private tutor in Kiev, he moved to Bremen in 1898, where he worked as concert master of the Philharmonic Orchestra and director of several choirs. From 1909 to 1914 he was conductor of the Musikverein in Königsberg and from 1914 to 1920 conductor of the Blüthner Orchestra in Berlin. From 1920 to 1928 he was general music director of the Duisburg Philharmonic and from 1929 to 1932 chief conductor of the Dresden Philharmonic. After that he often travelled to the countries of Northern and Eastern Europe as a guest conductor.

As a conductor he preferred the composers of the late romantic period and was particularly committed to the dissemination of Richard Strauss's works. As a composer, he created chamber music, smaller orchestral works (Overture to a comedy by Shakespeare, op. 15) and the opera Das Hofkonzert, whereby in his late compositions he distanced himself from the emotional burden of his previous works.

Paul Scheinpflug fell ill during a concert tour to Lithuania, which he started at the end of February 1937. On 11 March 1937, at the age of 61, he died of pneumonia in a hospital in Memel. His grave is located at the Friedhof Heerstraße in Berlin-Westend (Grablage: 20-B-34).

His daughter Marianne (1900–1986) had been married to the composer Ernst Pepping since 1937.

== Work ==
- Trio-Suite für Klavier, Violine und Cello : op. 19
- Streich-Quartett in c-Moll für zwei Violinen, Viola und Violoncello
- Worpswede : Stimmungen aus Niedersachsen : für mittlere Singstimme, Violine, Englisch Horn (oder Viola) u. Klavier, op. 5
