= Blüthner Orchestra =

German symphony orchestra

The Blüthner Orchestra was a German symphony orchestra based in Berlin. Founded in 1907, it operated until 1925 when it was absorbed into the Berlin Symphony Orchestra.

The orchestra specialised in engaging young players. Its first leader (concertmaster) was the 21-year-old Louis Persinger, afterwards one of Yehudi Menuhin's teachers, and some years later the future conductor Eugene Ormandy (then known as Jenö Blau) held the same post at the age of 18; in 1917 he appeared with the orchestra as conductor on a tour in Hungary. Another conductor, the contemporary-music specialist Hermann Scherchen, played among the violas of the orchestra while still in his teens. The orchestra's other conductors included at various times Max von Schillings, Siegmund von Hausegger and Selmar Meyrowitz. In 1913 the orchestra gave the first performance of Sergei Bortkiewicz's first piano concerto, with Hugo van Dalen as soloist.

In the same year the orchestra was engaged by the Anker record company for the first-ever recording of a substantial extract from Richard Wagner's Ring des Nibelungen, namely about three-quarters of the first act of Die Walküre. The conductor was Edmund von Strauss, the orchestra's business manager, and the principals were Jacques Decker (Siegmund) and Erna Denera (Sieglinde).

The orchestra came under strong criticism in 1919 for playing at a memorial ceremony for the revolutionary activists Karl Liebknecht and Rosa Luxemburg; its then musical director, Paul Scheinpflug, had to issue a public apology.
