= Roger Tellart =

Roger Tellart (9 March 1932 in Paris – 22 July 2013 id.) was a French musicologist and journalist, a specialist of Claudio Monteverdi, Heinrich Schütz, the madrigal and early music on which he published several works.

He was the father of viellist Christophe Tellart (Ensemble Perceval, Hespèrion XXI, Ensemble Réal, Poème Harmonique, etc.).

== Biography ==
Tellart wrote for the daily La Croix and musical magazines Diapason and Goldberg Magazine. He also wrote for the music magazines Classica, Concertclassic.com and La Lettre du musicien.

For a while, he was a producer at Radio France, where he was also invited several times to participate in programs on Baroque music. He was a frequent contributor to Radio Suisse Romande in programs dealing with early music.

Roger Tellart held the rank of Chevalier of the ordre des Arts et des Lettres and was a member of the Académie Charles-Cros.

== Bibliography ==
- 1964: Monteverdi, Seghers
- 1968: Schütz – Musiciens de tous les temps, Seghers
- 1997: Claudio Monteverdi, Fayard, (Grand prix de la critique 1997/1998)
- 2004: Le Madrigal en son jardin, Fayard
