= Teresa Llacuna =

Teresa Llacuna i Puig (born 27 May 1935 in Igualada) is a Catalan classical pianist, the only daughter of poet Joan Llacuna.

== Biography ==
Besides recording a complete work by Manuel de Falla, Teresa Llacuna gave her name to an international piano competition and counted the pianist Pascal Gallet among her students.

== Selected discography ==
- Trois siècles de musique espagnole, Soder
- Intégrale de Falla, EMI Sony
- Récital Granados, EMI Sony
- Rondos à deux pianos, Chopin, EMI
