= Erna Denera =

German opera singer

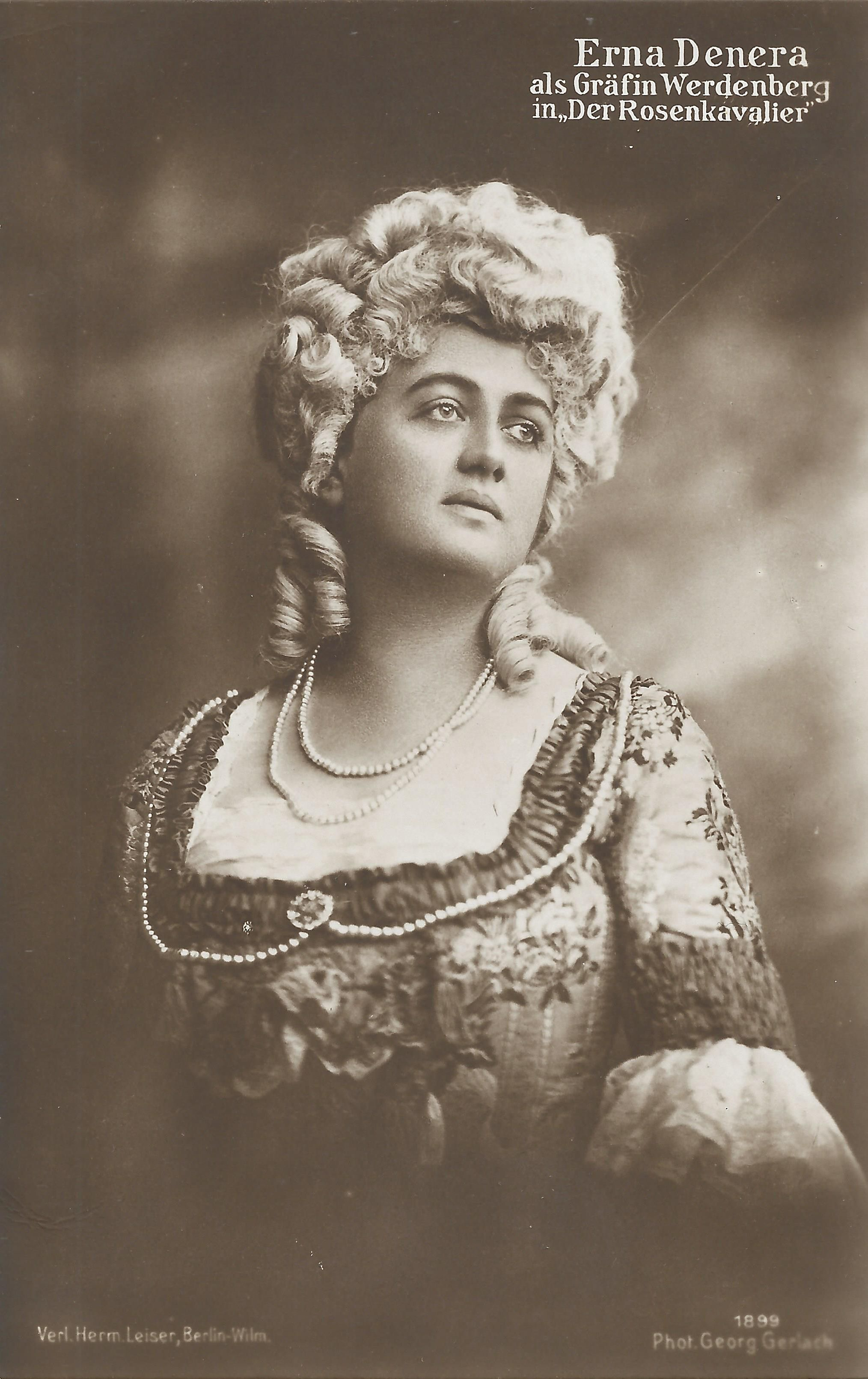

Erna Denera (4 September 1879 – 16 March 1938) was a German operatic soprano and voice teacher. She was a member of the Berliner Hofoper (Berlin Royal Opera), from 1908 to 1920 and was awarded the title Kammersängerin.

Denera was born in Murowana-Goslin, Province of Posen, Prussia (Murowana Goślina, Poland), she died in Berlin at age 58. Her body rests at the Stahnsdorf South-Western Cemetery near Berlin.

== Recordings ==
From 1909 to 1915, Denera made around one hundred recordings for the labels Odeon/Parlophone, Deutsche Grammophon, Pathé, Favorite and Anker, including singing the role of Sieglinde in the first complete recording of the first act of Wagner's Die Walküre, with the Blüthner Orchestra conducted by Edmund von Strauß.
