= Fabienne Pascaud =

French journalist (born 1955)

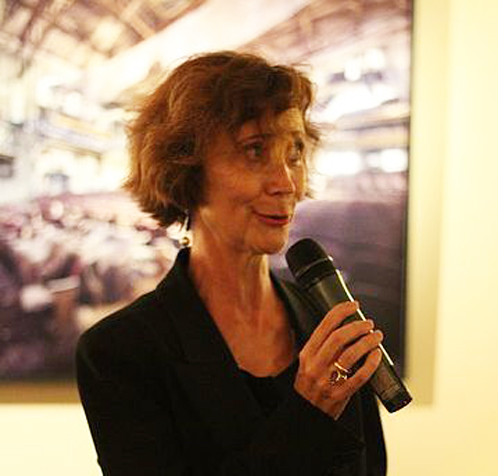
- Born: 1 July 1955 (age 70); Paris, France
- Occupation: Cultural critic

Fabienne Pascaud (born 1 July 1955) is a journalist, critic, and editor in chief for French publication Télérama. She is best known for her theater criticism.
