= Duisburg Philharmonic =

German orchestra

The Duisburg Philharmonic Orchestra (in German: Duisburger Philharmoniker) is a German orchestra based in Duisburg. The orchestra is resident at the Philharmonie Mercatorhalle Duisberg. The Duisburger Philharmoniker is the accompanying orchestra of the Duisburg Opera "Deutsche Oper am Rhein". The current Intendant (managing director) of the orchestra is Nils Szczepanski.

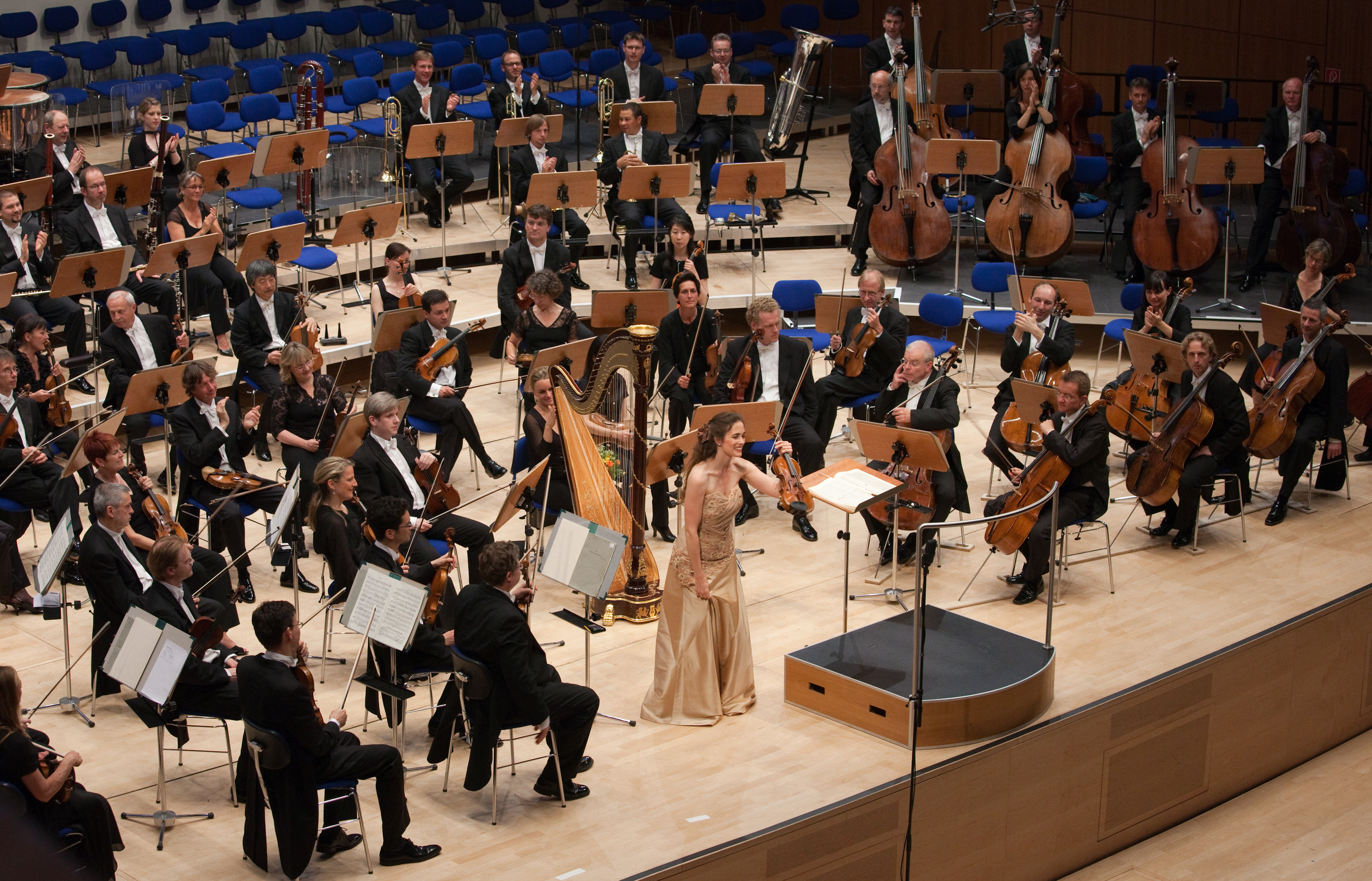
Duisburg Philharmonic Orchestra 2010

== History ==
The orchestra was founded in 1877, with Hermann Brandt as its first Generalmusikdirektor (GMD) from 1877 to 1893. His successor, Walter Josephson, who served in the post from 1899 to 1920, conducted the German premiere of Anton Bruckner's Symphony No. 9.

The orchestra regularly gave concerts in the Duisburg Mercatorhalle until its demolition in 2003. Subsequently, the orchestra performed concerts in the Duisburg Theater am Marientor. In April 2007, the new Mercatorhalle in the City Palais was completed, and the orchestra subsequently took up residence there. In August 2012, the Mercatorhalle was closed because of fire safety problems. The Duisburg Philharmonic returned to giving concerts in the Theater am Marientor from the 2012-2013 season through the 2015-2016 season. Following renovation, the Duisburg Philharmonic returned to the Philharmonie Mercatorhalle Duisberg in September 2016.

The most recent GMD of the orchestra was Axel Kober, from 2019 through the close of the 2024-2025 season. In June 2025, the orchestra announced the appointment of Stefan Blunier as its next GMD, effective with the 2026-2027 season, with an initial contract of three years.

== Awards ==
- 2013: Musikpreis der Stadt Duisburg

== General Music Directors ==
- Hermann Brandt (1877–1893)
- Walter Josephson (1899–1920)
- Paul Scheinpflug (1920–1928)
- Eugen Jochum (1930–1933)
- Otto Volkmann (1933–1944)
- Georg Ludwig Jochum (1946–1970)
- Walter Weller (1971–1972)
- Miltiades Caridis (1975–1981)
- Lawrence Foster (1982–1987)
- Alexander Lazarev (1988–1993)
- Bruno Weil (1994–2002)
- Jonathan Darlington (2002–2011)
- Giordano Bellincampi (2012–2017)
- Axel Kober (2019–2025)
- Stefan Blunier (designate, effective 2026)
