= Qiulin Zhang =

French opera singer

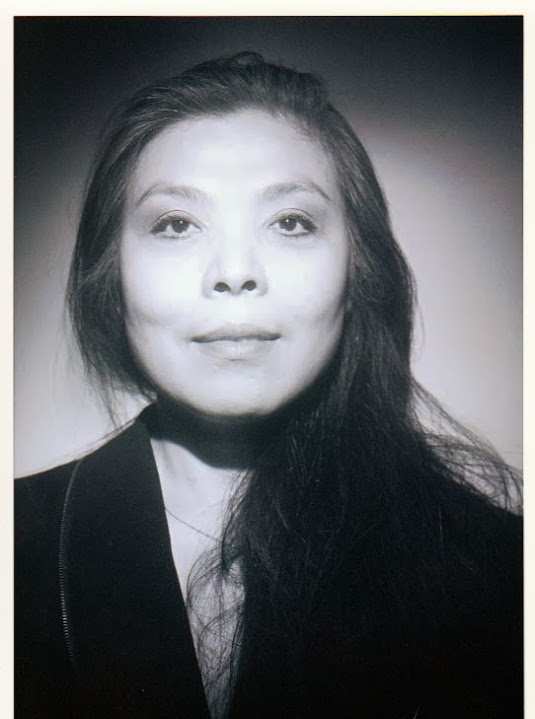
Qiulin Zhang

Qiulin Zhang (or Qiu Lin Zhang) is an opera contralto of Chinese descent. Zhang was born in 1964 into a family of traditional Chinese Opera singers. Her father was a local opera singer of Qinqiang and play writer. Zhang is the winner of the Grand Prix of the International Contest of Marmande in 1995 and winner of the Masters of French Song in Paris the same year. She appears regularly in European opera houses such as the Toulouse Théâtre du Capitole, Opéra Bastille in Paris, the Dublin Opera, and others in London, Amsterdam, and Madrid. Known for her performances in Wagner's operas, in 2010, she sang Erda (one of her signature roles) in the Paris Opera's first performance of the complete Ring Cycle in 53 years.

== Career ==
Zhang earned her first diploma from the College of Music of Xi'an, China, in 1984, and was a soloist at the Symphony Orchestra of Xi'an until 1995. Zhang began singing in France in 1989. Educated in Paris at the Schola Cantorum, and then at the Conservatoire de Toulouse she won in the 1995 Grand Prix du Concours International de Chant de Marmande and was winner of the Masters of French Chant in Paris in the same year.

She sang Maddalena in Rigoletto at the Opéra de Rennes, Sesto in La clemenza di Tito at the Opéra Saint-Étienne, Suzuki in Madama Butterfly at the Opéra Saint-Étienne, and Opéra de Marseille, Carmen at the Hong Kong Arts Festival with the Orchestre national de Lille, Ute in Die lustigen Nibelungen by Oscar Straus in Caen. At the Théâtre du Capitole in Toulouse, she was Mother Marie in Dialogues of the Carmelites, Néris in Cherubini's Médée, Third Dame in The Magic Flute, Erda and First Norn in Robert Wilson's 2005 Paris production of Der Ring des Nibelungen at the Théâtre du Châtelet, the voice of Antonia's mother in The Tales of Hoffmann, A Voice From Above in Die Frau ohne Schatten, a Theban Woman in Enescu's Œdipe. She sang Roßweiße and Schwertleite in Die Walküre at the Opera in Amsterdam and at the Teatro Nacional de São Carlos in Lisbon. With the Orchestre de Paris, she was Erda in Siegfried at the Royal Albert Hall in London and in the Escorial in Spain.

In concert, she performed Das Lied von der Erde by Mahler with the Orchestre de Paris directed by Christoph Eschenbach and the Orchestre national de Lille conducted by Jean-Claude Casadesus. She sang Verdi's Requiem with the Orchestre de Besançon, Poème de l'amour et de la mer with the Orchestra Festival Marmande, Mozart's Requiem and Mendelssohn's Elijah with Symphony Orchestra Tours, the Stabat Mater by Pergolesi and Respighi's Il Tramonto with the National Chamber Orchestra of Toulouse, Mahler's Des Knaben Wunderhorn with Opera Rouen, the Alto Rhapsody by Brahms with the Orchestre national de Lille, The Diary of One Who Disappeared by Janáček in Brussels.
