= Reine Flachot =

French cellist (1922–1998)

Reine Flachot (10 October 1922 in Santa Fe, Argentina – 29 October 1998) was a French female cellist.

== Biography ==
Reine Flachot arrived in France at the age of twelve when her French parents returned home. There, she began her studies with Jean Dumont and then, in 1935, entered the Conservatoire de Paris in the class of Gérard Hekking. At the age of fifteen or sixteen, she was awarded several prizes (1st prize of cello in 1938) and entered the concerts Colonne for which she performed the Cello Concerto by Édouard Lalo.

There followed a career that made her the ambassador of the "French school of cello for sixty years" (Christine Heurtefeux) all over the world, with a strong activity between the end of the 1950s and the beginning of the 1970s, a period from which she devoted much time to the transmission of her knowledge. During these years, she served in particular the works of Darius Milhaud (Suite Cisalpine, 1954), Charles Brown (Concerto pour violoncelle et orchestre, 1956), Pierre-Max Dubois (Concerto pour violoncelle et orchestre, 1958), Francis Miroglio (Sonate pour violoncelle et piano, 1961), Émile Mawet (Concerto pour violoncelle et orchestre, 1965), Aram Khachaturian (Concerto-Rhapsodie, 1967), André Jolivet (Concerto pour violoncelle et orchestre, 1971), Henri Sauguet (Sonate pour violoncelle, 1972...

At the same time, Reine Flachot became a pedagogue. In 1966, she joined the École normale de musique de Paris, which she left in 1970 for the Centre musical international of Annecy before the Tōhō Gakuen called her. She stayed there until 1974, when she joined the City of Basel Music Academy, while continuing her studies at the ENM in Paris and becoming the first woman named cello teacher (CNSM de Lyon). She ceased all teaching activities in 1995. That same year, she gave her last concerts in Japan, preferring to withdraw. "I prefer," she said, "to leave a beautiful picture of me and I'm tired."

She was then 73 years old and ended a career having led her to choose with restraint her discographic production (4 recordings).

During her career, Reine Flachot was distinguished by the Piatigorsky Prize (1954) and the international Orense Prize (1965).

Reine Flachot died aged 76.
