= Miłosz Magin =

Polish composer and pianist

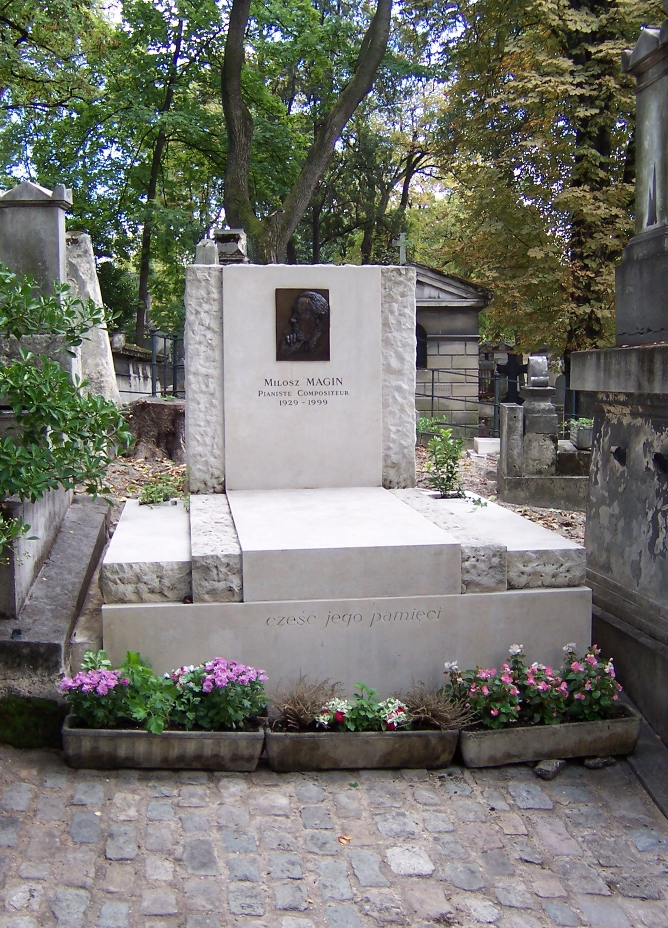
Magin's grave in Paris.

Miłosz Magin (6 July 1929 – 4 March 1999) was a Polish composer and pianist.

== Biography ==
Born in Łódź, Poland, Miłosz Magin showed considerable musical abilities from early childhood. He was a student of piano with Margerita Trombini-Kazuro and composition with both Kazimierz Sikorski and Jan Maklakiewicz; the latter he considered his spiritual father. Magin also studied violin, cello and ballet. In 1957, he completed his piano, compositional and conducting studies, graduating from the Warsaw Higher School of Music with distinction.

Miłosz Magin won prizes in several top international competitions: the V International Chopin Piano Competition in Warsaw (honorable mention), the Marguerite Long-Jacques Thibaud Competition in Paris and the Vianna da Motta Competition in Lisbon. He left his native country together with his wife Idalia Magin and stayed in Portugal, Germany, and England until finally settling in Paris in 1960.

Magin's career as an international soloist was suddenly interrupted in 1963 after his left wrist was broken in a car accident. However, he eventually regained his playing abilities, and in 1968 started recording the complete works of Chopin for Decca, which is now regarded as a reference recording (a complete reissue on CD was made by Universal in 2000).

Other recordings: Chopin, Four Ballades, IPG (Societe francaise du son) 1973 Long Playing Record.

During his years of recovery Magin went back to composition, which became one of his main priorities for the rest of his life. A prodigious piano virtuoso, he regularly gave concerts in different countries around the world, mainly performing works by Chopin, his favorite composer, but also works by Mozart and various Polish, French and Russian composers, as well as his own music.

In parallel to his career as a pianist and composer, Miłosz Magin became a popular teacher with students who came to him from all over the world, including such famous performers as Jean-Marc Luisada. According to his students, Magin was a master, not only sharing his knowledge but having the gift to inspire and tactfully advise while demanding high standards of his students.

He left a considerable body of music: piano works, including four sonatas and collections for young pianists, several concertos (four for piano, two for violin, one of each for cello and clarinet ), two symphonies, and a ballet, as well as vocal and orchestral works. Not attached to any particular musical style, Miłosz Magin's music is notable for its balance between melody, harmony and rhythmic play. He was often inspired by the rhythms of his native Poland. Appreciated by the public, his works are now recorded and published as well as featured in the repertory of great performers.

With the help of his wife Idalia, also a pianist, in 1985 Magin founded the Miłosz Magin International Piano Competition in Paris. Devoted to the discovery of young international talents and to the promotion of Polish music, this competition takes place every two years with increasing popularity.

Magin died on 4 March 1999 of a heart attack while touring with concerts in Tahiti. He was buried next to Chopin's tomb at the Père-Lachaise cemetery in Paris, France. Miłosz Magin is considered one of the greatest Polish composers of the 20th century.

== Sources ==
- Biography
