= Vladimir Mendelssohn =

Romanian composer (1949–2021)

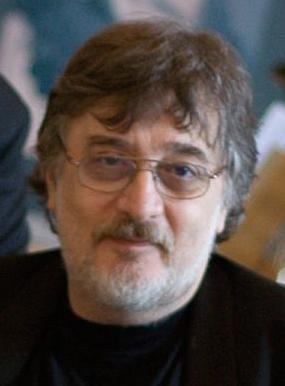
- Mendelssohn in 2007
- Born: 29 November 1949; Bucharest, Romania
- Died: 13 August 2021 (aged 71)
- Occupations: Composer; Professor

Vladimir Mendelssohn (29 November 1949 – 13 August 2021) was a Romanian composer, violist, and professor. He had served as Director of the Kuhmo Chamber Music Festival since August 2005.

== Biography ==
Mendelssohn was born into a family of musicians and attended the National University of Music Bucharest. He taught at a number of conservatories, such as the Conservatoire de Paris, where he served as a professor of chamber music. He was also a professor at the Folkwang University of the Arts and the Royal Conservatory of The Hague.

Mendelssohn composed a number of film scores, such as Darclee, which was presented at the Cannes Film Festival in 1961 and The Violin Player, shown at the 1994 Cannes Film Festival.

Mendelssohn gave master classes in Sweden, Switzerland, the Netherlands, Italy, and France and served on the juries of several international competitions. He became Director of the Kuhmo Chamber Music Festival in August 2005 and was part of the Enesco Quartet.

Vladimir Mendelssohn died on 13 August 2021 at the age of 71.
