= Kuhmo Chamber Music Festival =

Kuhmo Chamber Music Festival (Finnish: Kuhmon Kamarimusiikki) is an international chamber music festival held every July for two weeks in Kuhmo, Finland. It is the largest chamber music festival in Finland in terms of sold tickets. The festival attracts 6,000–8,000 visitors annually, with 95% of them being from Finland. The number of concerts held within the two weeks is around 70. Approximately 170 artists from Finland and abroad perform at the festival. The Kuhmo Chamber Music Festival also offers music courses, master classes and chamber music workshops that are taught by the festival artists.

== History ==
The Kuhmo Chamber Music Festival was founded by a Finnish cellist Seppo Kimanen in 1970. He and a handful of fellow students were looking for a place to arrange music courses and play chamber music. The total number of the audience in the 1970 festival was 800. In 2013, there were 72 concerts and over 36 000 tickets sold. Vladimir Mendelssohn was the Artistic Director of the festival since 2005 till his death in 2021. He is followed by the violinists Minna Pensola and Antti Tikkanen.

== Venues ==
The main venue is the Kuhmo Arts Centre. It was opened in 1993, and it is renowned for both its acoustics and design. There are two halls; Lentua, which 668 seats, and Pajakka, with 99 seats. Other venues include the Kontio School and Kuhmo Church.
