= Alain Lompech =

Alain Lompech (born 29 August 1954 in Paris) is a French journalist, music critic, writer and radio producer.

== Biography ==
After studying music (solfeggio, piano, harmony, analysis), Lompech became music critic at the monthly Diapason, of which he became responsible for the critical part of records (1977–1981).

Subsequently, he joined Le Monde de la musique where he was successively head of department and deputy editor-in-chief (1981–1988). In 1988, he went to the daily Le Monde as a music critic and journalist, then became first critic, after having been among the founding team of the supplement Arts et spectacles with Anne Rey and Olivier Schmitt.

In November 1994, Alain Lompech was appointed head of the Arts et Spectacle section In the Culture department led by Josyane Savigneau, which was thus divided into Cinéma, Arts et spectacles, Le Monde des livres and the Radio et Télévision supplement. In 2002, Jean-Marie Colombani, the director of Le Monde, asked him to deal with the strained relations between the editors of the daily and the website lemonde.fr. A year later, he joined the central editorial office of the daily newspaper, where he was the deputy editor the Monde and its various publications.

At le Monde, Alain Lompech published numerous reviews of concerts, recitals and operas, as well as a large number of surveys on French and international musical life. He also hosted the Radio-TV column and the last page of the newspaper. For more than twenty years, he also held the gardening column of the evening newspaper. From monthly, it quickly became weekly, and ended only when Alain Lompech left Le Monde in July 2011.

Since then, he has joined France Musique as program advisor. On this radio station, Alain Lompech hosted a program called Le Gai laboureur, which featured musical works related to nature, and for four years, À côté du piano, a program which, for an hour and a half, painted a portrait of pianists of yesterday and today, known or less well known.

He has been a member of the entrance and exit jury of various conservatories and music schools and of several international piano competitions (Naples, Monte Carlo, Rio de Janeiro, São Paulo).

In 2012, he published at Buchet Chastel a collection of forty-four portraits devoted to some great pianists of the twentieth century, including 12 women.
