= José García Román =

Spanish composer

José García Román (born 1945) is a Spanish symphonic composer. He is the author of more than one hundred works, including La resurrección de don Quijote, El bosque de Diana (with libretto by Antonio Muñoz Molina), Ruinas de Oradour Sur Glane, and Epur si muoeve o Paseo de los Tristes.

He lives and works in Granada, where he is director of La Academia de Bellas Artes.
