= Le Monde de la musique =

French newspaper

Le Monde de la musique was a French monthly musical magazine published from 1978 to 2009 with a circulation of 20,000 copies in 2008.

The magazine was founded in 1978 by Le Monde and Télérama at the initiative of Jean-Michel Croissandeau, in charge of editorial diversification in Le Monde with Jacques Fauvet, then director of the daily newspaper. The design of the project - dealing with all music and not just "classical" music - was developed in partnership with Télérama, with Francis Mayor as Managing Editor, with the support of an editorial board including journalists from both parent publications. The first editors of the magazine were Louis Dandrel and Anne Rey. Le Monde de la musique was then published by various companies. Its chief editorship was assured by personalities such as Anne Rey, Jacques Drillon, François Pigeaud, Alain Lompech, Thierry Beauvert and Nathalie Krafft.

In 2009, the magazine disappeared and its readership was transferred to Classica.

It ranked records according to a star system, with four stars being the highest rating. Some selected records received the CHOC symbol.
