= Marielle Nordmann =

French musician

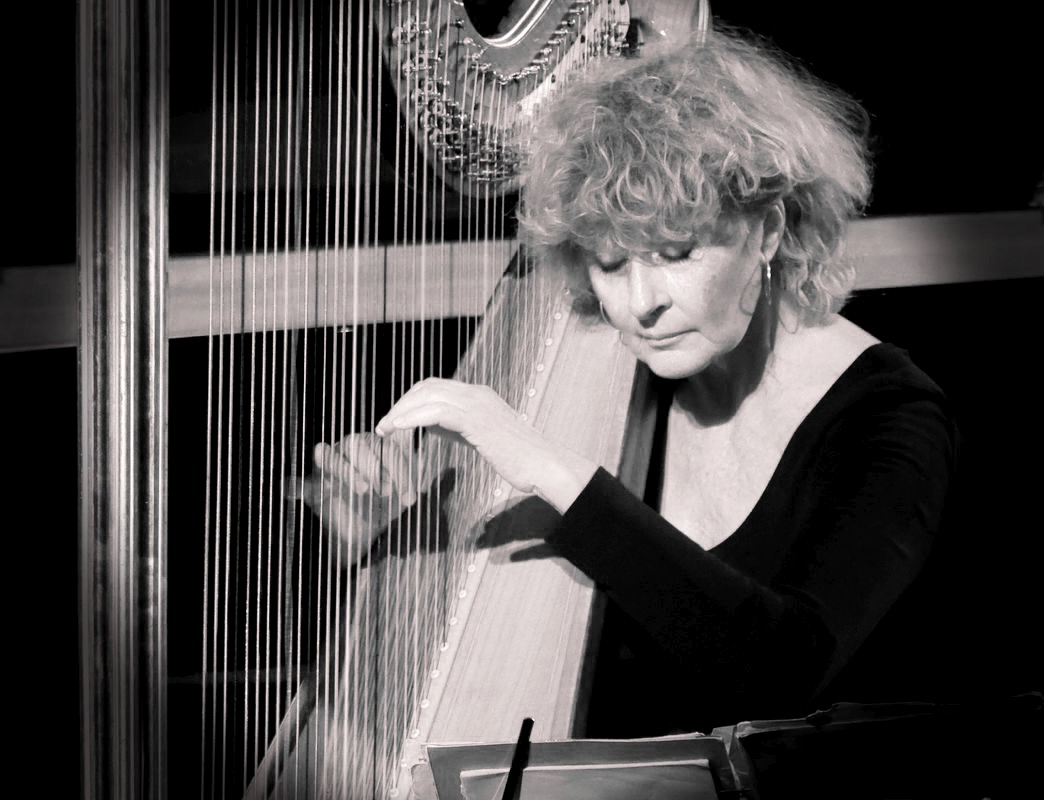
Marielle Nordmann - Harpist and creator of musical shows

Marielle Nordmann (born 24 January 1941 in Montpellier) is a French classical harpist.

== Biography ==
Marielle Nordmann was a pupil of Lily Laskine at the Conservatoire de Paris where she won a first prize in 1958. Between 1960 and 1978, she led the Nordmann Trio with flautist André Guilbert and cellist Renaud Fontanarosa.

An international soloist, Marielle Nordmann divides her time between concerts, teaching and artistic creation. She gives concerts around the world (New York, Tokyo, Moscow, Buenos Aires, São Paulo, Bangkok ...), creating shows where she likes to blend the arts (mime, dance, comedy).

She gives master classes for children, organizes competitions in France and abroad, and has created a foundation helping young musicians. She taught in Argentina from 1989 to 1999.

She co-founded the Lili Laskine competition in 1993 and the "Journées de la harpe" at Arles in 1995.

3 releases: with Nemanja Radulović (violin), Eduardo Garcia (bandoneon) and the Quatuor Debussy.

1 release: Harp concertos by Boieldieu, Parish Alvars and Viotti with Jean–Pierre Rampal and the Franz Liszt chamber orchestra.

Marielle Nordman is the author of the book Lily Laskine, Éditions Cahiers du Temps, 1999 ISBN 2-911855-15-9
