= Télérama =

Weekly French magazine

- Categories: Cultural magazine Television magazine
- Frequency: Weekly
- Publisher: Publications de la Vie Catholique
- Total circulation (2020): 480,676
- Founder: Georges Montaron
- Founded: 1947; 78 years ago
- Company: Groupe Le Monde
- Country: France
- Based in: Paris
- Language: French
- Website: telerama.fr
- ISSN: 0040-2699

Télérama is a weekly French cultural and television magazine published in Paris, France. The name is a contraction of its earlier title: Télévision-Radio-Cinéma. Fabienne Pascaud is currently managing editor. Ludovic Desautez is deputy editor for digital. Valérie Hurier is deputy editor for print.

== History and profile ==
Télérama was established in 1947. Its founder was the Christian journalist Georges Montaron. The magazine had been published by Hachette Filipacchi until 2001 when it began to be published by Quebecor World Inc.

In 1973, Télérama acquired the title and readership of La Semaine Radio Télé.

The magazine has been owned by La Vie-Le Monde since 2003. It is published on a weekly basis on Wednesdays by Publications de la Vie Catholique. The magazine had a Christianity-oriented political stance.

The headquarters of Télérama is in Paris. Its primary contents are television and radio listings, though the magazine also prints film, theatre, music and book reviews, as well as cover stories and feature articles of cultural interest. The magazine owns a radio station. Stéphane Charbonnier was among the former contributors of the magazine.

== Circulation ==
The 1990 circulation of Télérama was 515,000 copies. It was one of fifty best-selling television magazines worldwide with a circulation of 664,000 copies in 2001. The magazine sold 649,000 copies in 2005. Its circulation was 650,000 copies in 2007.

In 2010 Télérama had a circulation of 633,559 copies. Its circulation was 578,680 copies in 2014.

Year	Circulation
2002	664,008
2003	664,647
2004	658,153
2005	654,400
2006	653,156
2007	650,414
2008	650,910
2009	643,957
2010	641,255
2011	–
2012	621,417
2013	602,236
2014	586,553
2015	572,489
2016	553,592
2017	524,908
2018	503,106
