= Diapason (magazine) =

French classical music magazine

- February 2021 cover
- Editor: Emmanuel Dupuy
- Frequency: monthly
- Circulation: 35419 (as of 30 June 2008)
- First issue: 1956
- Company: Mondadori
- Country: France
- Based in: Paris
- Language: French
- Website: www.diapasonmag.fr

Diapason is a monthly magazine, published in French by Italian media group Mondadori. The magazine focuses on classical music, especially classical music recordings and hi-fi. The magazine was created by Georges Chérière in Angers, France under the title Diapason donne le ton dans l'Ouest (Tuning Fork Sets the Tone in the West) and the first issue was published in Paris, 1956.

The critics of Diapason review internationally released classical CDs and DVDs each month, and the best ten albums are awarded by the prestigious Diapason d'Or. The award is comparable with those given by the BBC Music Magazine and Gramophone.

Diapason provides information online via two websites.

The principal French language alternative to Diapason was Le Monde de la musique, but that magazine ceased publication in 2009. Much of its readership then transferred to Diapason, increasing the circulation there. That magazine's highly regarded equivalent to the Diapason d'Or was the Choc of Le Monde de la musique, often spelled CHOC.

== See also ==
- Le Monde de la musique
- International Record Review
- Roger Tellart (1932–2013), French musicologist, occasional contributor to the magazine
