= Radio in Paris =

Rad Radio transmission in Paris began in 1921, and today there are many AM and FM radio stations available to listeners in Paris and the Île-de-France region.

== History ==
The first radio broadcast in Paris aimed at the general public took place on 22 December 1921. The next year, the French government allowed the establishment of the first private radio station in Paris: Radiola.

After the Second World War, Parisian radio was nationalized, and it was not until 1981, following the election of François Mitterrand that private companies were able easily to broadcast in the Paris area. Mitterrand was attempting to permit the growth of radio stations through privatization and fewer regulations, following the Italian example (in 1977, the Italian government permitted the establishment of private stations, leading to a boom in the number of stations). In the early 1980s, there were more than 200 radio stations in Paris. These stations often overlapped, broadcast only sporadically and often low-quality content. This chaotic situation came to an end after the establishment of several regulatory agencies — first the Haute Autorité, then the CNCL, and finally the Conseil Supérieur de l'Audiovisuel which granted licences to operate on specific frequencies to certain companies.

== The first radio stations in Paris (chronological) ==
- Radio Tour Eiffel (general interest; state radio) 24 December 1921-June 1940. At the start, it broadcast only for a half-hour a day: a weather forecast, a review of the press and music. The first news broadcast took place on it 3 November 1925.
- Radiola (general interest; private) 6 November 1922 to 28 March 1924. Radiola's first trials took place on 26 June 1922 and its first regular broadcasts began on 6 November 1922. Marcel Laporte provided the most-frequently-heard voice for the station. Its first news broadcasts took place on 6 January 1923. It became Radio Paris on 29 March 1924 (general interest; private, then state-run on 17 December 1933) 29 March 1924–17 June 1940. It kept its name of Radio Paris from July 1940 until August 1944, but the station was then run by Nazis and French collaborators.
- Radio PTT (general interest; state-run) 20 January 1923 until June 1940.
- Poste Parisien (general interest; private) from 30 March 1924 to June 1940.
- Radio LL (general interest; private) from March 1926 until 28 September 1935. It became Radio Cité (general interest; private) from 29 September 1935 until June 1940.
- Radio Vitus (general interest; private) from 1 December 1926 until 14 January 1934. It became Poste de l’Ile de France (general interest; private) from 15 January 1934 until June 1940
- Radio Luxembourg (general interest, private) from 15 March 1933 until 21 September 1939, and was resurrected from 1945 to 1966, before becoming RTL (general interest) since 1966
- Radio 37 (general interest; private) from 5 September 1937 to 13 June 1940
- Poste colonial (general interest, directed towards the French colonies; state radio) from 30 April 1931 until 1 March 1938. It became Paris Mondial (general interest, directed towards French colonies, in 20 languages; state radio) from 2 March 1938 until 17 June 1940.

== From Public Service to Pirate Radio (non-exhaustive chronological list) ==
- Paris Inter, then RTF Inter (general interest, state-run) from 1947 to 1963. Became France Inter (general interest, state-run) from 1963 on.
- Europe 1 (general interest, private) from 1955 on.
- France Musique (music, public service) from 1963
- France Culture (culture, public service), since 1963
- FIP (music, public service) since 1971
- RFI (news and information, public service — similar to the BBC and NPR) since 6 January 1975
- Radio Verte (green/ecological/pirate) from 1977 until 1981
- Radio Ivre (drunk radio) (pirate) from 1979 until 1981
- Radio 7 (music, public service) from 1980 until 1987
- Ici et Maintenant (here and now) (political/socialist) from 21 June 1980 (was pirate at the start) until 5 September 1996
- Radio Carbone 14 from 1981 until 1983. It was here that Jean-Yves Lafesse and "Supernana" débuted.

== From free-form to formats (non-exhaustive chronological list) ==
- Nova (general interest, FM), from 25 May 1981 on.
- Ado FM (local, then musical) from 1981, changed to a commercial station run by Start (Vibration), and now plays R&B.
- Radio Libertaire (anarchist) since 1981.
- Radio Notre-Dame (catholic) since 1981.
- RFM (music) since May 1981, was independent, then owned by the British firm Crown, then groupe Lagardère.
- NRJ (music) since 1981.
- Radio FG (originally serving the gay community, it has now somewhat walked away from that angle. Today it is classified as a mostly techno/house radio) since 1981 (Trivia: FG stands for Fréquence Gay).
- Radio Montmartre (French music) from 1981 until 11 July 1995. Became Montmartre FM (French music) from 11 July 1995 until 1998, then became MFM (French music) since 1998.
- La voix du Lézard (modern rock) from 1982 to 1986. Became Skyrock (top 40, then top 40/rap) since 1986
- Radio Classique (classical) since January 1983.
- Nostalgie (oldies) since 1986
- France Info (news, public service) since 1 June 1987.
- Electric FM (?; owned by de Bouygues); since 1987.
- RTH (rock) from 1981 to 1987.
- Ca bouge dans ma tête (world) from 1985 to 1987. Became Ouï FM (alternative rock) SINCE 1987.
- Hit FM (?) from 1 January 1985 to 11 mars 1988. Became Europe 2 (Adult contemporary, sister station to Europe 1) from January 1987 until 12 mars 1988, at which point it became Hit FM once again).
- CFM (General interest FM, sister station of Europe 1) from 15 April 1985 to 30 May 1986. Broadcasts some news shows produced by Europe 1.
- Gilda (General interest FM) from 1981 until 1987. Became Chérie FM (Music and news; owned by NRJ) in 1987.
- Paris Jazz (jazz) since 1987. Merger of "Génération" and "Paris Jazz sur Paris".
- Pacific FM (music) from July 1987 until 13 November 1989 (became Rire et Chansons, (music and sketches; owned by NRJ) from 14 November 1989 on.
- Chic FM (music) from January 1986 until 2 September 1987 Became FUN (top 40) in 1987.
- 95.2 (music) from 1983 until 1987. Became KISS FM (General interest FM) from 30 avril 1987 until October 1990; Frequency shared since April 2001 by Ici et Maintenant and Radio Néo
- Muppies FM (children's radio) began as pirate in 1987, later became Superloustic (children's radio) from May 1987 until September 1987. Restarted in 2004 as an AM station.
- Radio Eglantine (Portuguese) from the 1980s until the 1990s.
- KWFM (rock) from September 1989 until October 1990, following California FM [not the US station from Tucson, AZ].
- Aventure FM (owned by the French Army) from December 1987 until 1989. Became Maxximum (dance; owned by RTL) from 23 October 1989 to 5 January 1992. Became M40 (top 40; owned by RTL) from 6 January 1992 until 18 January 1995. Became RTL 1 (top 40; owned by RTL) from 19 January 1995, then became RTL 2 (pop-rock; owned by RTL) from 1995 on.
- BFM (news) since 1992.
- Bizz FM (Music) from November 1992 to 31 December 1993. Station belonged to Eddie Barclay. Became Chante France (French music) since le 1 January 1994.
- Le Mouv' (soft rock, public service) since 8 December 2001.
- Radio Néo (New artists) since 2001.

Broadcasters in the banlieue

- IDFM (Val d'Oise) since 1982, initially Radio-Enghien.
- CVS (Hauts de Seine) from 1981 until September 1990. Became O'FM from September 1990 until 1998. Became Sport O’FM in 1998, then Sport FM since 2002.
- Radio Caroline, Daniel Guichard and his Radio-Bocal (both in Nanterre), and RSRM. (Rueil-Malmaison) broadcast locally a few years at the start of the 1980s.
- TSF radio du jazz (communist, then jazz) since 1981, broadcast successively from Nanterre then from Bobigny.
- MBS, Daniel Gérard, (92.8) country music and American music.

== Current radio band in Paris (FM/DAB/Internet) ==
FM stations

Frequency	Branding	Format	Notes
87,8 FM	France Inter	Generalist, public radio	
88,2 FM	Générations	Urban contemporary	
88,6 FM	Radio soleil	Multilingual, community radio	Arabic
89,0 FM	Radio France Internationale	News/Talk	
89,4 FM	Radio Libertaire	Anarchist (Left-Wing) talk	
89,9 FM	TSF Jazz	Jazz	
90,4 FM	Nostalgie	Oldies	
90,9 FM	Chante France	Chanson	
91,3 FM	Chérie FM	Adult contemporary	
91,7 FM	France Musique	Classical, Jazz	
92,6 FM	Tropiques FM	Tropical radio/Caribbean also airing music from Overseas departments and regions of France	
92,8 FM	Music Box	American rock, country	
93,1 FM	Radio pays / Aligre FM	Community radio	
93,5 FM	France Culture	Spoken word (culture, current affaires)	
93,9 FM	Radio Campus Paris / Vivre FM	Student radio	
94,3 FM	Radio Orient	Multilingual	Arabic
94,8 FM	Radio J / Judaïques FM / RCJ / Radio Shalom	Judaism	
95,2 FM	Ici et Maintenant / Radio Néo	Free-Form	
95,6 FM	Radio courtoisie	Conservative talk	
96,0 FM	Skyrock	Rhythmic contemporary (Hip-Hop, Pop)	
96,4 FM	BFM Business	Financial news	
96,9 FM	Voltage	Dance/EDM	
97,4 FM	Rire et Chansons	Comedy radio	
97,8 FM	Ado FM	Urban contemporary/Classic hip hop/Contemporary R&B	
98,2 FM	Radio FG	Dance/EDM	
98,6 FM	Radio Alfa	Multilingual	Portuguese
98,8 FM	Radio Espace FM	Tropical radio	
99,0 FM	Radio Latina	Spanish CHR	
99,5 FM	France Maghreb / AYP FM	Multilingual	Arabic, Maghrebi
99,9 FM	Sud Radio	News/Talk, Community radio, Music	
100,3 FM	NRJ	Contemporary Hit Radio	
100,7 FM	Radio Notre Dame / Fréquence protestante	Religious (Catholic, Protestant)	
101,1 FM	Radio Classique	Classical	
101,5 FM	Radio Nova	Variety	
101,9 FM	FUN Radio	Pop, Contemporary R&B, Dance/EDM	
102,3 FM	Ouï FM	Mainstream rock	
102,7 FM	MFM	Adult contemporary	
103,1 FM	RMC Info	News/Talk, Sports	
103,5 FM	Europe 2	Contemporary Hit Radio	
103,9 FM	RFM	Contemporary Hit Radio, Classic hits	
104,3 FM	RTL	News/Talk	
104,7 FM	Europe 1	News/Talk	
105,1 FM	FIP	Public radio, Music	
105,5 FM	France Info	News	
105,9 FM	RTL 2	Pop, rock	
106,3 FM	Fréquence Paris plurielle	Community radio	
106,7 FM	Beur FM	Multilingual	Arabic, Maghrebi
107,1 FM	Ici Ile de France	News, music	
107,5 FM	Africa Radio	African pop	
107,7 FM	Autoroute FM	Traffic radio	
107,9 FM	Vent d'Ouest (pirate) (not regular) / Radio Plus (pirate) (not regular)	Pirate radio	

=== DAB ===
DAB	Name	Format	Owner or parent company
6A	Ado FM	Urban contemporary/Classic hip hop/Contemporary R&B	
6A	Beur FM	Multilingual	
6A	Crooner radio	Easy listening/Adult standards	
6A	FG chic	Lounge music/Chill music/Deep house	
6A	FG dance	Dance/EDM	
6A	Radio France Internationale	News/Talk	
6A	France Maghreb 2	Multilingual	
6A	Radio Latina	Spanish CHR	
6A	Live Nation Radio	Pop/Rock/Live focused-radio	
6A	Maxximum	Club music	
6A	NRJ	Contemporary Hit Radio	
6A	Radio Orient	Multilingual	
6C	AirZen	Well-being	
6C	Chérie FM	Adult contemporary	
6C	Radio Classique	Classical	
6C	FUN Radio	Pop, Contemporary R&B, Dance/EDM	
6C	Radio Latina	Spanish CHR	
6C	MFM	Adult contemporary	
6C	Nostalgie	Oldies	
6C	NRJ	Contemporary Hit Radio	
6C	Rire et Chansons	Comedy radio	
6C	RTL	News/Talk	
6C	RTL 2	Pop, rock	
6C	Skyrock	Rhythmic contemporary (Hip-Hop, Pop)	
6C	Skyrock Klassiks	Classic hip hop	
6D	Africa Radio	African pop	
6D	Antinea radio	Smooth Jazz/Lounge	
6D	Radio Bonheur	Christian music/talk	
6D	Radio courtoisie	Conservative talk	
6D	Eu!radio	community radio	
6D	Radio Lovely	Soft adult contemporary	
6D	Radio MBS	Oldies	
6D	MCD	multilingual	
6D	MyZen radio	Well-being/relaxation music	
6D	Phare FM	Christian music/talk	
6D	Urban Hit	Urban contemporary	
6D	Virgin radio	Contemporary Hit Radio	
8C	France Inter	Generalist, public radio	
8C	France Info	News	
8C	France Culture	Spoken word (culture, current affaires)	
8C	France Musique	Classical, Jazz	
8C	FIP	Public radio, Music	
8C	Le Mouv'	Urban contemporary	
8C	BFM Radio	News/Talk	
8C	BFM Business	Financial news	
8C	Europe 1	News/Talk	
8C	Europe 2	Contemporary Hit Radio	
8C	KTO radio	Christian (Catholics)	
8C	RFM	Contemporary Hit Radio, Classic hits	
8C	RMC Info	News/Talk, Sports	
9A	Aligre FM	Community radio	
9A	AYP FM	Multilingual	
9A	Radio Campus Paris / Vivre FM	Student radio	
9A	Frequence India	South Asian music	
9A	Fréquence protestante	Religious (protestant)	
9A	Radio Fuego	Spanish CHR	
9A	Ici et Maintenant	Free-Form	
9A	Radio Mandarin d'Europe	Chinese radio	
9A	Radio Néo	Indie	
9A	Radio Ter	Community radio	
9A	World Radio Paris	Community radio/Multilingual (English)	
9B	Aasman Radio	South Asian music	
9B	Radio Alfa	Multilingual	
9B	CineMusic Radio	Soundtrack music	
9B	Hope Radio	Gospel	
9B	idFM Radio	Community radio	
9B	Radio-J	Judaism	
9B	Medi1 Radio	Moroccan news/music	
9B	Node	Experimental music	
9B	Radio Pitchoun	Children radio	
9B	PİMG Radio	Multilingual/community	
9B	Radio RCJ	Judaism	
9B	Radio Sensations (Paris)	Community	
9B	Tech Radio	Talk radio	
11A	Collector Radio	classic hits	
11A	Espace FM	Caribbean	
11A	Le Figaro Radio	News/Talk	
11A	La Grande Musique	Classical	
11A	Les Inrocks Radio	Eclectic	
11A	Radio Monaco	Pop	
11A	Radio Life	Family	
11A	Radio Paname	French music	
11A	Sanef 107.7 (Île-de-France)	Traffic radio	
11A	Séquence FM (RNT)	Soundtrack music/Talk	
11A	Soo good Radio	Variety	
11A	Trace FM	Urban contemporary	
11A	Tropiques FM	Caribbean	
11B	ici Paris Île-de-France	News, music	
11B	Chante France	Chanson	
11B	Évasion FM	CHR	
11B	Radio FG	Dance/EDM	
11B	Générations	Urban contemporary	
11B	JAZZ radio	Jazz	
11B	Melody in Paris	Chanson/Oldies	
11B	Ouï FM	Mainstream rock	
11B	Radio Notre Dame	Catholic	
11B	Radio Nova	Variety	
11B	Sud Radio	News/Talk, Community radio, Music	
11B	TSF Jazz	Jazz	
11B	Voltage	Dance/EDM	

Internet radio stations

Frequency	Name	Format	Owner or parent company
Internet only	Mouv'	Urban contemporary	Radio France

== See also ==
- Radiodiffusion-Télévision Française
- Office de Radiodiffusion Télévision Française
