= Jean Morzadec =

French singer-songwriter (1953–2020)

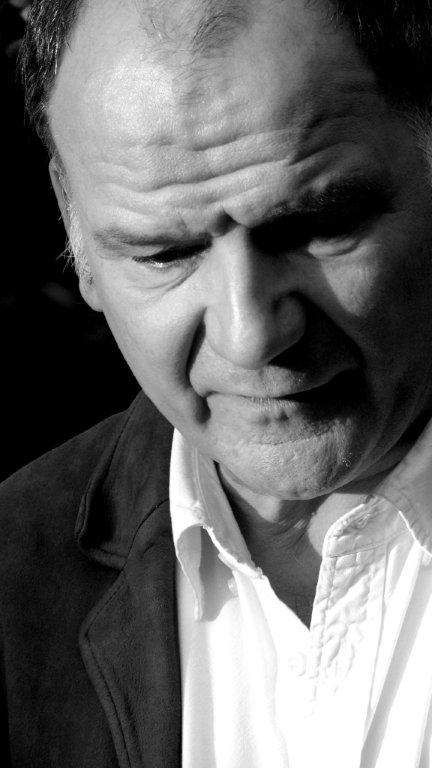
- Jean Morzadec
- Born: 25 February 1953; Saint-Martin-du-Vivier, France
- Died: 13 November 2020 (aged 67)
- Occupations: Singer-Songwriter; Writer

Jean Morzadec (25 February 1953 – 13 November 2020) was a French singer-songwriter, writer, and journalist. In 2005, he began running the website "Le Choix de Librairies" in partnership with 20 minutes, France Info, France Culture, Lire, FIP, and France 5.

== Biography ==
Morzadec lived in England, Guatemala, and Greece, surviving off of small jobs. He joined France Inter in 1975 as a director and producer, alongside Claude Sérillon, Marcel Jullian, Jacques Chancel, Stéphane Bern, and others. In 1998, he became director of 98 Radio France, which covered the 1998 FIFA World Cup, following his appointment by Michel Boyon, President of Radio France. In 1999, he was appointed director of programming for France Inter by Jean-Marie Cavada and Jean-Luc Hees. During his tenure, an increased focus on musical programming was undertaken by the radio station.

In 2006, Morzadec created the website www.lechoixdeslibraires.com, in partnership with France Inter and Le Monde. He also created the Agence audiovisuelle du livre, which created written cultural content, as well as audio and video related to the publication and selling of books. In 2011, he created an app for iOS and Android from his website, in partnership with Orange S.A.

In 2013, filmmaker Olek Yaromova encouraged Morzadec to sing his songs at the Théâtre de Nesle in Paris. The show, titled "Le Fleuve tendre", was filmed by Yaromova and accompanied by pianist Alceo Passeo and cellist Chloé Boyaud. On YouTube, Morzadec would pay tribute to his supporters and those who encouraged him to sing. On 17 March 2015, he sang and recorded a concert with the Alliance française for a CD album.

Jean Morzadec died on 13 November 2020 at the age of 67.

== Books ==
- Lettres à mon libraire (2009)
- Les écrivains préférés des libraires (2011)

== Discography ==
- Le Fleuve Tendre (2014)
