= Ici Sud Lorraine =

ici Sud Lorraine
Nancy; France
- Frequencies: 100.5 MHz (Nancy-Malzéville); 100.0 MHz (Épinal)

Programming
- Format: Generalist station
- Network: ici

Ownership
- Owner: Radio France

History
- Former names: Radio Nancy (1944–1945); Radio Lorraine (1945–1953); Radio Lorraine-Champagne (1953–1969); Inter Lorraine-Champagne Ardenne (1969–1972); Inter Nord-Est (1972–1975); FR3 Radio Nord-Est (1975–1982); Radio Nord-Est (1983–1984); Radio France Nancy (1984–1992); Radio France Nancy Lorraine (1992–2000); France Bleu Sud Lorraine (2000–2025)

Links
- Website: www.francebleu.fr/sud-lorraine

ici Sud Lorraine is a regional radio station serving Southern Lorraine from studios in Nancy. It is part of the ici network of regional radio stations in France.

== History ==
The station was founded in October 1944 following the Battle of Nancy as Radio Nancy. The station was transferred over to the Radiodiffusion française (RDF) public institution on 23 March 1945. They established 9 different regional stations, including in Lorraine, where Radio Nancy became Radio Lorraine sometime in April 1945.

Radio Nancy's first studio was set up in the attic of the Hôtel des Postes in Place Saint Jean. The station then moved to Avenue Foch. The city of Nancy offered the disused galleries of its former thermal spa, Maison de la Radio de Nancy Thermal, in order to build the new studios. They were inaugurated on 19 November 1949.

In October 1953, the inauguration of the new Nomeny transmitter (power of 100 kW) allowed Radio Lorraine to be accessible to the Champagne-Ardenne region. It also was renamed to Radio-Lorraine-Champagne. It was broadcast on frequency modulation on the France Inter network. It was renamed Radio Nord-Est in 1972.

Following the breakup of the ORTF in July 1974, the regional radio stations were integrated into the new national France Régions 3 (FR3) service. It became FR3 Radio Grand-Est on 7 April 1975.

Under the audiovisual law of 29 July 1982, regional stations passed from FR3 to Radio France on 1 January 1983. FR3 Radio Grand-Est then went through 3 different names before settling on Radio Nancy Lorraine on 6 April 1992. It took its present name with the launch of France Bleu in 2000.

Following the launch of the new France Bleu network on 4 September 2000.

France Bleu Sud Lorraine changed name is ici Sud Lorraine on 6 January 2025, it took its current name.

== Programming and broadcasting ==
The regional programs of ici Sud Lorraine are broadcast live from 6 a.m. to 1 p.m. and 2 to 7 p.m. from Monday to Friday, and from 7 a.m. to 12:30 p.m. on weekends. The national programs of the ici network are broadcast the rest of the day and at night.

The station also broadcasts sport programs specific to Meurthe-et-Moselle and the Vosges, including match commentaries of the AS Nancy Lorraine men's football and SLUC Nancy Basket basketball teams.

From 2003 to 2017, the Nancy station produced various programs also broadcast on the frequencies of France Bleu Lorraine Nord under a syndication agreement.

== Transmitters ==
In addition to two main transmitters—100.5 MHz from the Nancy-Malzéville transmitter, and 100.0 MHz from the Épinal transmitter, and in addition a network of local repeaters in the Vosges mountains.
