= Ici Breizh Izel =

French local radio station

ici Breizh Izel
Quimper; France
- Broadcast area: Lower Brittany
- Frequencies: 93.0 MHz FM (Brest); (16 total transmitters)
- RDS: ICI BZH

Programming
- Languages: French, Breton
- Format: Generalist

Ownership
- Owner: Radio France
- Sister stations: see ici

History
- First air date: 1982
- Former names: Radio Bretagne Ouest (1982–1985); Radio France Bretagne Ouest (1985–2000); France Bleu Breiz Izel (2000–2009); France Bleu Breizh Izel (2009–2025)

Links
- Website: www.francebleu.fr/breizh-izel

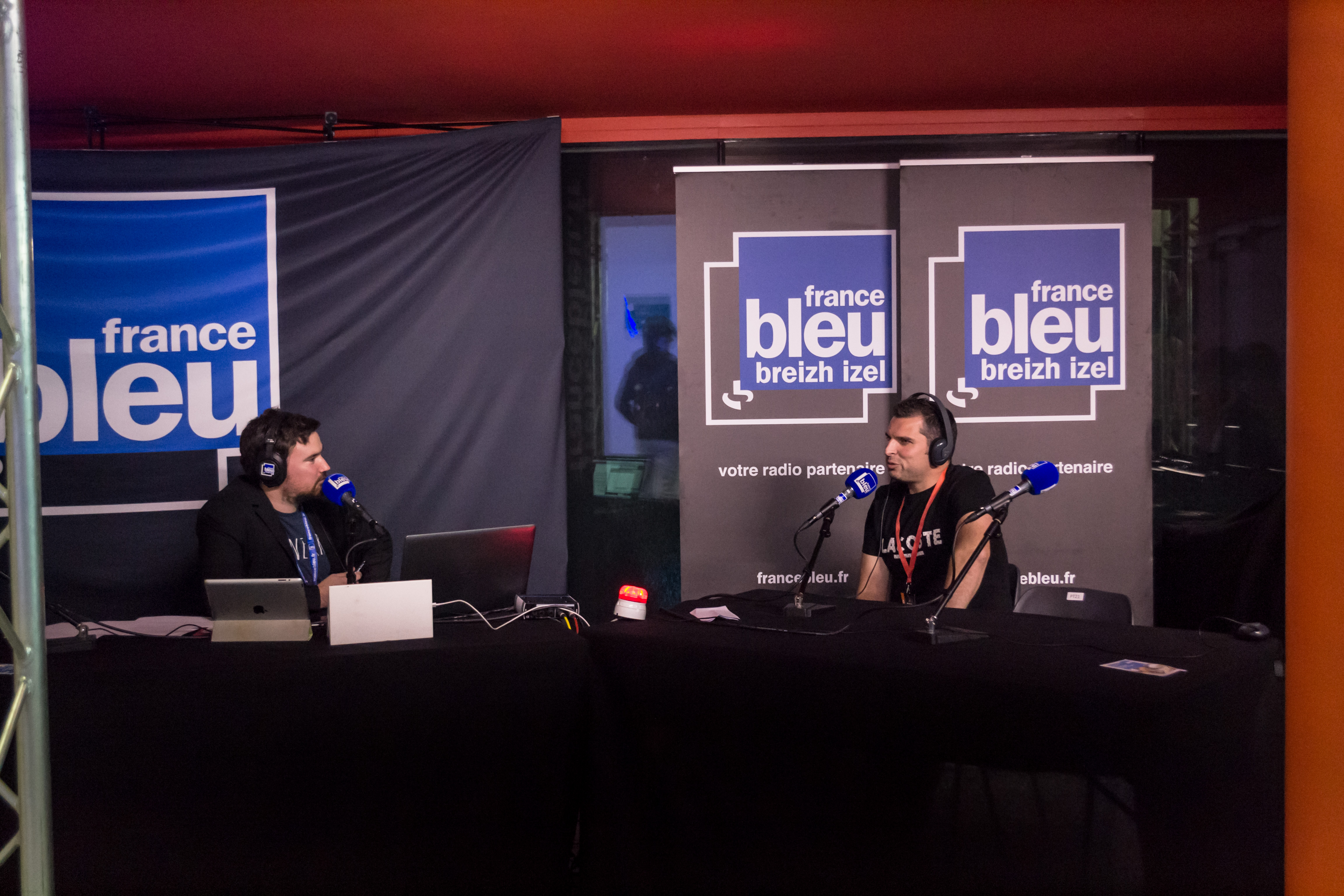
France Bleu Breizh Izel studio at the Brest Challenger, 2016

France Bleu Breizh Izel, also known as ici Lower Brittany and ici Breizh Izel, is a public service generalist radio station located in Lower Brittany, where Breton is traditionally spoken. The station broadcasts in Finistère, parts of western Côtes-d'Armor and western Morbihan. It was established on 3 August 1982 under the name Radio Bretagne Ouest.

== History ==
The history of decentralised public radio in Lower Brittany has its origins in 1946 with the construction of the Quimerc'h radio transmitter. This transmitter broadcast national programs of the French Radiodiffusion, the program developed by the regional station of Rennes, but also programs specific to Lower Brittany in French and Breton. The station was initially known as Radio Quimerc'h and then Radio Brest. With the break-up of the ORTF, the Brest studio in 1976 became a local branch of Radio Armorique, placed under the authority of FR3 Rennes.

In 1982, the organization of public radio stations was remodeled. Due to the changes, a new local station began broadcasting in Lower Brittany: Radio Bretagne Ouest. The station was then integrated into the public company Radio France. The studios, previously located at the esplanade François Mitterrand in Brest, were installed in Quimper, located at 155 bd Creách Gwen, on the evening of 11 December 2018. Radio Bretagne Ouest retains ownership of the premises in Brest, though it is currently occupied by a restaurant. Radio Armorique is no longer available in Lower Brittany, but continues its broadcasts in Upper Brittany from its base in Rennes.

When it was created in 1982, the station was called Radio Bretagne Ouest (Radio Breiz Izel in Breton). In 1985, the names of the local stations of Radio France were standardized: the station was then renamed Radio France Bretagne Ouest. On the occasion of the creation of the France Bleu network in the year 2000, the station took the name of France Bleu Breiz Izel. Since 2009, the station has been called France Bleu Breizh Izel, a name using the unified spelling of Breton.

In February 2019, the station hired a "new generation of bilingual journalists" after the retirement of previous journalists. From this point on, news is fully in bilingual French and Breton. However, during the start of the COVID-19 pandemic, Breton broadcasting was noticeably absent due to "reorganisation" from lockdown, causing criticism, especially as other France Bleu stations, such as Pays Basque continued broadcasting in regional languages.

On 11 September 2019, France Bleu Breizh Izel appointed Jean-Yves Lafesse as a columnist for the station, broadcasting humorous stories with his brother. He remained at the station until his death in July 2021.

In August, the station lost its broadcasting rights for the local Stade Brestois football team "until further notice". The reason apparently was the uncovering of information the football team did not want to be revealed. The station's director Gurvan Musset said: "Our radio is accused of having wanted to tarnish the image of the club, despite the facts. The information has been verified and confirmed by state services. We proposed to the leaders of the club to express themselves, they refused."

On 25 June 2022, the station celebrated its 40th anniversary with a concert show in Trévarez Castle, with over 3,600 listeners at the event.

As part of the rebrand of France Bleu into ici (radio network), the station changed its name to ici Breizh Izel in January 2025.

== Criticism ==
The station has faced criticism from some Breton nationalists, for an apparent disregard for Breton culture. For example, Bro Nevez in 2004 writes: "The France Bleu Breizh Izel station has been directed by its centralized leadership in Paris [Radio France] to cut down on Breton language and Breton music programming".

They have also been criticized by the nationalists for their lack of alertness regarding the events of Bretagne: "The France Bleu Armorique and France Bleu Breizh Izel radios do not allow an actor to be alerted and simultaneously of any event affecting the peninsula."

== Programming ==
=== In French language ===
From 6 a.m. to 7 p.m., programs in French are produced by the ici Breizh Izel teams in Quimper (except 13/16). The rest of the programs in French come from the national program of ici.

=== In the Breton language ===
Each week, ici Breizh Izel broadcasts around twenty hours of programs in the Breton language:

Daily: three 5-minute news bulletins 5 in the morning and one 7-minute newspaper at 7 p.m.

Monday to Friday 5: The Hentoù treuz program, from half an hour to midday, presented by Manu Mehu;

The evening program Breizh storming, two hours in the evening, presented by Clément Soubigou;

Le p'tit cours de breton, two morning chronicles presented by Clément Soubigou;

Saturday and Sunday: the program Breizh O Pluriel, three hours in the afternoon.

== List of frequencies ==
France Bleu Breizh Izel broadcasts through most of Bretagne as well as being available online. Here are the following frequencies:

=== Côtes d'Armor ===
- 101,4 FM - Guingamp
- 102,7 FM - Quintin
- 104,8 FM - Pontrieux and Quemper-Guézennec
- 104,1 FM - Perros-Guirec
- 104,6 FM - Tréguier
- 96,9 FM - Paimpol and Ploubazlanec

=== Finistère ===
- 96,8 FM - Quimperle
- 96,6 FM - Concarneau
- 96,7 FM - Douarnenez
- 105,3 FM - Audierne
- 99,3 FM - Brest
- 97,0 FM - Pont-Aven
- 104,9 FM - Châteaulin
- 101,4 FM - Landerneau

=== Morbihan ===
- 90,5 FM - Pontivy
- 90,4 FM - Lorient and Kervignac

== Other broadcast methods ==
=== Satellite ===
ici Breizh Izel is broadcast on the Fransat satellite package (via the Eutelsat satellite).

=== Internet ===
The ici Breizh Izel website streams the radio station live and provides podcasts downloads of most of the programs broadcast. The station is also available on most streaming internet radio stations.

=== Television ===
Since 10 December 2019 the ici Matin Breizh Izel program has been broadcast Monday to Friday from 7:00 a.m. to 8:40 a.m. on television thanks to France 3 Bretagne in Finistère only.
