= Ici RCFM =

Corsican regional radio station

ici RCFM
- Ajaccio; France
- Broadcast area: Corsica and parts of North Sardinia via FM
- Frequency: 97.0 / 100.5 FM (Ajaccio)

Programming
- Format: Generalist
- Network: ici

Ownership
- Owner: Radio France

History
- First air date: 1984
- Former names: Radio Corse Frequenza Mora (1984–2000); France Bleu RCFM (2000–2025)

Links
- Website: www.francebleu.fr/rcfm

ici Radio Corsica Frequenza Mora, usually just shortened to ici RCFM, is a generalist radio station serving the island of Corsica. It broadcasts in both French and Corsican.

== History ==
The station was established as Radio Corse Frequenza Mora (RCFM) in 1984, 2 years after the appearance of the first regional programs on the local France Inter station. On 4 September 2000 RCFM became connected to the new France Bleu network.

In November 2015, a second studio was added at Place du Donjon, in Bastia, alongside the original one located in Residence du Parc (Ajaccio).

On 1 January 2016 the AM radio section was shut off, one of the last in Europe.

On 6 January 2025 France Bleu RCFM changed name is ici RCFM.

== Other links ==
- ici
- Radio France
- List of radio stations in France
