= Ici Saint-Étienne Loire =

Radio France regional station

ici Saint-Étienne Loire
Saint-Étienne; France
- Frequency: 97.1 MHz
- RDS: ICISTETI

Programming
- Format: Generalist station
- Network: ici

Ownership
- Owner: Radio France

History
- First air date: 9 September 2013
- Former names: France Bleu Saint-Étienne Loire (2013–2025)

Links
- Website: www.francebleu.fr/saint-etienne-loire

ici Saint-Étienne Loire, sometimes referred to as ici Saint-Étienne is a generalist radio station broadcasting from Saint-Étienne. It is the youngest of the France Bleu stations, beginning broadcasting on 9 September 2013. The local headquarters are in Saint-Étienne in the Manufacture Plaine Achille, near the studios of France 3.

The station is also broadcast in the Loire department, a large part of the Haute-Loire as well as a small part of that of Rhône on FM: it covers the agglomerations of Saint-Étienne, Roanne, Montbrison and Le Puy-en-Velay.

== History ==
The creation of the station was announced in January 2013 by Phillippe Chaffanjon to fill a gap in network coverage. The name of the station was announced on 5 April 2013.

Soft launching without an announcement, it began broadcasting on 9 September 2013, as the 44th outpost of the network. Its creation was criticized by the union of Radio France employees as "a detriment to the other stations in the network".

In 6 January 2025 into ici, France Bleu Saint-Étienne Loire changed name is ici Saint-Étienne Loire.
