= Ici Touraine =

Regional radio station in western France

ici Touraine
Tours; France
- Frequencies: 92.9 MHz (Chinon); 98.7 MHz (Tours); 105.0 MHz (Indre-et-Loire)

Programming
- Format: Generalist with news and adult contemporary music
- Network: ici

Ownership
- Owner: Radio France

History
- First air date: 14 March 1988
- Former names: Radio France Tours (1988-2000); France Bleu Touraine (2000-2025)

Links
- Website: www.francebleu.fr/touraine

ici Touraine (98.7 FM) is a French regional radio station owned by Radio France under the ici network. It broadcasts to the Indre-et-Loire region as well as Loché-sur-Indrois, with the cities of Tours and Orléans in its coverage area.

Generally, the radio broadcasts news, usually regional, but it can also be about sports, culture, recent events, etc. It is a generalist channel. It also has its own flagship channels, available to view on their programming schedule.
