= Ici Poitou =

Regional radio station in western France

ici Poitou
Programming
- Languages: French, Poitevin dialect (some flagship broadcasts)
- Format: Generalist with news and adult contemporary music
- Network: ici

Ownership
- Owner: Radio France

History
- First air date: 19 November 2001
- Former names: France Bleu Poitou (2001–2025)

Links
- Website: www.francebleu.fr/poitou

ici Poitou is one of the 44 ici generalist regional stations. Ici Poitou serves the departments of Vienne and Deux-Sèvres. It is also accessible to parts of Vendée and the far north of Charente and Charente-Maritime via FM. Charente and Charente-Maritime are served by ici La Rochelle.

== Frequencies ==
ici Poitou broadcasts in several different places using the FM band:

- Vienne / Deux-Sèvres: 106.4MHz (Amailloux transmitter)
- Poitiers: 87.6 MHz
- Châtellerault: 103.3 MHz
- Niort: 101.0 MHz
