= Ici Pays de Savoie =

Regional radio station in France

ici Pays de Savoie

Chambéry; France
- RDS: BLEU.SAV

Programming
- Languages: French, Occitan
- Format: Generalist
- Network: ici

Ownership
- Owner: Radio France

History
- First air date: 31 May 1988
- Former names: Radio France Savoie; Radio France Pays de Savoie; France Bleu Pays de Savoie

Links
- Website: www.francebleu.fr/pays-de-savoie

ici Pays de Savoie, sometimes referred to as ici Savoie, is a generalist radio station based in Chambéry. The radio station serves the departments of Savoie and Haute-Savoie, though it can also be received as far as Geneva, Lyon, and in parts of Drome, Isére, Jura and Saône-et-Loire.

== History ==
Radio France Savoie was started in 1988. After an expansion to its coverage area, it was renamed Radio France Pays de Savoie and then folded into the new France Bleu network in 2000.

And into ici the changed name is ici Pays de Savoie in 2025.

== Transmitters ==
ici Pays Savoie broadcasts on the FM band using the following frequencies, as determined by the CSA:

In Savoie:

- Chambéry - Aix-les-Bains: 103.9 MHz
- Albertville: 103.9 MHz
- La Rochette: 106.2 MHz
- Aiguebelle: 104.1 MHz
- Epierre: 105.3 MHz
- La Chambre: 103.9 MHz
- Saint-Jean-de-Maurienne: 103.6 MHz
- Saint-Michel-de-Maurienne: 103.8 MHz
- Modane: 103.6 MHz
- Bessans: 106.1 MHz
- Aussois: 105.6 MHz
- Lanslebourg-Mont-Cenis: 97.2 MHz
- Le Châtelard: 88.8 MHz
- Ecole: 93.7 MHz

In Haute-Savoie :

- Annecy: 95.2 MHz
- Chamonix-Mont-Blanc: 100.5 MHz
- Cluses: 107.3 MHz
- Combloux: 105.9 MHz
- Megève: 106.4 MHz
- Morzine: 103.6 MHz
- Saint-Jorioz: 103.3 MHz
- Sallanches: 105.9 MHz
- Thônes: 105.3 MHz

In Ain :

- Belley: 103.9 MHz
- Gex: 106.1 MHz
- Oyonnax: 102.6 MHz

ici Pays de Savoie also broadcasts using satellite transmission. It uses the Eutelsat 5 West B, which has a coordinate of 5.0°W.
