= Ici Pays d'Auvergne =

Regional radio station in France

ici Pays d'Auvergne
Clermont-Ferrand; France
- Frequencies: 102.5 MHz (Clermont-Ferrand); 10 total transmitters
- RDS: BLEU.AUV

Programming
- Network: ici

Ownership
- Owner: Radio France

History
- First air date: 1944
- Former names: Radio Auvergne (1944–1964); Radio Clermont Auvergne (1964–1974); FR3 Radio Auvergne (1975–1983); Radio Puy de Dôme (1983–1986); Radio France Puy de Dôme (1986–2000); France Bleu Pays d'Auvergne (2000–2025)

Links
- Website: francebleu.fr/pays-d-auvergne

ici Pays d'Auvergne (Occitan: içi País d'Auvèrnhe, lit: ici, Country of Auvergne) is a generalist public service radio station. It broadcasts in the departments of Puy-de-Dôme, Allier, Cantal and most of western Haute-Loire.

== History ==
=== 1944-1967: Early years ===
Radio in Auvergne was born in hiding the day after the liberation of Clermont-Ferrand, at the end of August 1944. On 8 September 1944, the announcement "Ici Clermont, Radiodiffusion française" was heard. It would follow the first announcements of the "Poste FFI Clermont-Auvergne" radio.

The first team moved into Royat. One of the member of the team would later become the commune's mayor. At the microphone were quite a famous couple at the time: Rene and Françoise Paput. Rene Paput created the character "Pére Johannet", whom a lot of people in Auvèrnhe believe is real. He notably appeared in the local agricultural broadcast and magazine. He also hosted broadcasts called Theater and Variety as well as Auvergne at the microphone.

On 5 October, the team moved into Chamalières, located at Avenue 7 de Royat. This building, where Aubert Frére had been arrested by the Germans, is now used as the headquarters of France 3 Auvergne-Rhône-Alpes.

By 1946, the station had expanded in broadcasting significantly following the establishment of a powerful medium wave signal from Ennezat, replacing the original transmitter at Gravenoire. The programs also expanded, with Jean Herbé and Émile Defforges hosting a variety show and a folklore program, respectively. original broadcasts, which were variety and folklore respectively.

=== 1964-1974: arrival of television through the ORTF ===
The arrival of television through the ORTF in 1964 was an important step in the history of regional audiovisual programs. Radio and television were installed together at Château Saint-Victor before the construction in the local park of the new TV studio at 137 avenue de Royat. This period lasted ten years, until 1974, which was the end of the ORTF.

=== 1974-1982: FR3 era ===
In 1975, regional television services came the banner of FR3.

The regional radio, Radio Auvergne (RTF) then Clermont Auvergne (ORTF), was attached to FR3 with the slogan "FR3 is our radio". From 7 April 1975, FR3 Radio Auvergne began its broadcasts in frequency modulation (FM) from the summit of Puy de Dôme. The medium wave transmitter continued to operate at Ennezat in Limagne. The service area extended to the four departments of the Auvergne region. René Paput is still there, but new voices are appearing. In particular those of Jacques Santamaria, Dominique Montavy, Christian Lassalas and Jacques Mailhot. The FR3 period lasted seven years until the arrival of Radio France.

=== 1983-2000: Radio France ===
A meeting between the managers of FR3 Radio, Maurice Pourchon, President of the Regional Council and Yves Guillon, vice-president of the General Council, took place in July 1981. A few weeks later, a delegation of elected officials from Auvèrnhe met Michèle Cotta, president of Radio France at the time. It was decided that Radio Puy de Dôme be installed in Clermont-Ferrand, the year 1982 being devoted to budgetary questions, the search for premises and their fitting out.

On 1 January 1983, Radio France declared its intention to support the local public service station.

Broadcasting began under the name Radio Puy de Dôme on 19 April 1983, and then Radio France Puy de Dôme in 1986.

=== Modern era ===
Since the merger of the Radio France regional networks on 4 September 2000, into France Bleu, France Bleu Auvergne has been operating under its format and name until 6 January 2025.

On 6 January 2025 into ici, ici Auvergne has been operating under its current format and name.

== Frequencies ==
Ici Pays d'Auvergne is broadcast from 10 FM transmitters in Cantal and Puy de Dôme: two in Clermont-Ferrand, Aurillac, Allanche, Riom, La Bourboule, Mont-Dore, Ambert, Issoire, and Bourg-Lastic.
