= Ici Périgord =

Regional radio station in France

ici Périgord
Périgueux; France
- Frequencies: 99.3 MHz (Périgueux); 99.0 MHz (Bergerac); 91.7 MHz (Limoges)

Programming
- Format: Generalist station
- Network: ici

Ownership
- Owner: Radio France

History
- First air date: 26 October 1982
- Former names: Radio Périgord (1982–1985); Radio France Périgord (1985–2000); France Bleu Périgord (2000–2025)

Links
- Website: www.francebleu.fr/perigord

ici Périgord is one of the public service radio stations of the ici network. It broadcasts in Dordogne and Lot-et-Garonne, though it is accessible to parts of Haute-Vienne on FM. It has its headquarters in Périgueux's regional Departmental Center for Communication, where it has been located since 2004.

== History ==
The Périgord branch of Radio France opened on 26 October 1982 at 5:45 a.m., under the name Radio Périgord. It became "Radio France Périgord" in 1985. At the time, it was only the sixth regional radio station in the network (compared to 44 as of 2022); it only had a single transmitter in Bergerac before being assigned a proper frequency on the Limoges - Les Cars transmitter at some point in 1984. It was folded into the new France Bleu network in 2000. And into ici in France Bleu Périgord changed name is ici Périgord in 2025.
