= Frédéric Lodéon =

French cellist, conductor and radio personality

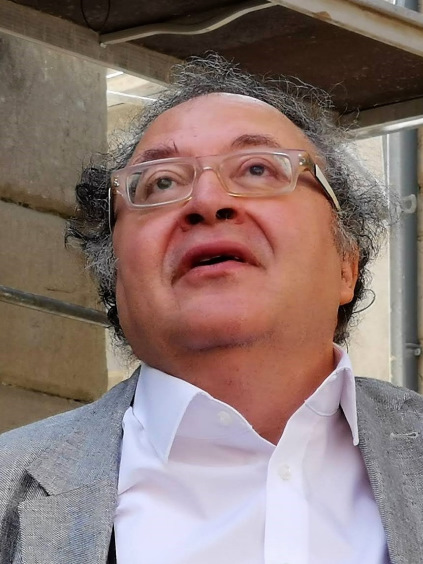
Frédéric Lodéon (2019)

Frédéric Lodéon (born 26 January 1952 in the 14th arrondissement of Paris) is a contemporary French cellist, conductor and radio personality.

== Biography ==
In 1960, his father, André Lodéon, was appointed director of the School of Music of Saint-Omer (Pas-de-Calais). It was there that the young Frédéric began learning music with the cellist Albert Tétard.

Frédéric Lodéon received the first prize of cello at the Conservatoire de Paris in 1969 (awarded unanimously by the jury). In 1977, he won ex-aequo the first Mstislav Rostropovich competition. He is the only Frenchman to have won it.

Thereafter, he directed several orchestras, among which the Orchestre philharmonique de Radio France, the Orchestre du Capitole de Toulouse, and the Orchestre National Bordeaux Aquitaine.

At the beginning of the 1990s, he presented on France 3 the program Musiques, Maestro ! which wants to make the Orchestre de Paris, the Orchestre National Bordeaux-Aquitaine or the l'Orchestre National de Lyon known to a large audience.

He became famous to the general public by his programs on France Inter, for which he animated Carrefour de Lodéon from 1992, as well as Les grands concerts de Radio France. His cheerful tone and his erudition earned him continued success. He also presented the Victoires de la musique classique on France 3. In June 2014, his broadcasts are removed from France Inter but Carrefour de Lodéon is aired on France Musique.

In 2015, he became the godfather of music festival of Saint-Malo "Classique au large".

Frédéric Lodéon is chevalier of the Légion d'honneur and officier of the Ordre des Arts et des Lettres.

== Selected discography ==
- Cello concertos by Vivaldi with Jean-François Paillard
- Cello concertos by Haydn
- Cello concertos by Boccherini
- Cello concertos by Robert Schumann
- Cello concerto by Lalo
- Schumann's Complete Chamber Music (with Jean Hubeau, Jean Moullière, the Via Nova Quartet (Erato Records)
- L'Épiphanie by André Caplet (Grand Prix of the Académie Charles-Cros)
- Sonatas by Schubert, Shostakovich, Prokofiev
- Trios by Schubert, Ravel
- Trio Op 50 by Tchaikovsky (Grand Prix of the Académie du disque français)
- Chamber music by Fauré
- Carmen, suites n° 1 & 2; Symphony n°1 in C major, by Georges Bizet (directed by the Orchestre National Bordeaux Aquitaine)

== Distinctions ==
- Chevalier of the Légion d'honneur, 2001
- Prix Richelieu 2007
- Commander of the Ordre des Arts et des Lettres, 2019
