= Ici Picardie =

French radio station in Picardie

ici Picardie
- Amiens; France
- Frequencies: 100.2 MHz (Amiens); 100.6 MHz (Abbeville); 106.8 MHz (Beauvais)
- RDS: BLEU.PIC

Programming
- Format: Generalist station
- Network: ici

Ownership
- Owner: Radio France

History
- First air date: 14 May 1985
- Former names: Radio France Picardie (1985–2000); France Bleu Picardie (2000–2025)

Links
- Website: www.francebleu.fr/picardie

ici Picardie is one of the public service regional radio stations of France Bleu. It serves the departments of Somme, most of Oise and Aisne, and is also accessible in the south of Pas-de-Calais.

== History ==
The station began broadcasting in 1985 under the name Radio France Picardie before the creation of France Bleu in 2000.

Since May 2016, France Bleu Picardie has been broadcasting its programs in Beauvais and northern Oise.

On 6 January 2025, into ici in France Bleu Picardie changed name is ici Picardie.
