= Ici Occitanie =

ici Occitanie

Toulouse; France
- Broadcast area: Haute-Garonne
- Frequency: 91.8 MHz FM (Toulouse)

Programming
- Language: French

Ownership
- Owner: Radio France
- Sister stations: see ici

History
- First air date: 23 February 2011
- Former names: France Bleu Toulouse (2011-2017); France Bleu Occitanie (2017–2025)
- Former frequencies: 90.5 MHz (2011–2017)

Links
- Website: www.francebleu.fr/toulouse

ici Occitanie is a public radio station in the Ici network for Toulouse and surrounding areas. The station broadcasts in the Haute-Garonne department on 91.8 MHz from Toulouse. France Bleu Toulouse is based in the former Toulousian studios of Mouv' after that station moved its primary studios to Paris.

France Bleu Toulouse started broadcasting on 23 February 2011 at 6 a.m. after a 2-month delay (it was originally planned to start broadcasting 14 December 2010), after a dispute between local independent radio stations and Radio France for using the 90.5 FM frequency.

On December 12, 2017, the name was changed to France Bleu Occitanie as part of a regional coverage expansion and the opening of a series of new transmitters. The Toulouse frequency was switched from 90.5 to 91.8 MHz, with the CSA granting 90.5 to 100% Radio. That week, three frequencies in Auch, Pamiers and Saint-Gaudens were opened. From 2018, the station slowly enlarged its coverage zone. by broadcasting its programs in the following towns: Albi, Cahors, Carmaux, Castres, Figeac, Mazamet (frequency preemption), Montauban (frequency preemption), Rodez and Villefranche-de-Rouergue. On January 6, 2025 the name was changed to ici Occitanie.
