= Ici Orléans =

French radio station

ici Orléans
- Orléans; France
- Broadcast area: Loiret, Loire-et-Cher and surrounding areas on FM

Programming
- Format: Generalist

Ownership
- Owner: Radio France
- Sister stations: see ici

History
- First air date: 4 February 1985
- Former names: Radio Centre (1980-1985); Radio France Orléans (1985-2000); France Bleu Orléans (2000-2025)

ici Orléans is a generalist public service radio station based in Orléans. It serves the departments of Loiret and Loir-et-Cher in France.

== History ==
Radio France Orléans transmitted its first broadcasts on 4 February 1985. It succeeded Radio Center which had been broadcasting since 9 June 1980, operated by FR3. The station retroceded to Radio France in 1983.

== Frequencies ==
ici Orléans broadcasts its programs on the FM band using, depending on the geographical area, the following transmission frequencies:

- Orleans / Loiret: 100.9 MHz
- Blois: 93.9 MHz
- Gien: 103.6 MHz
- Montargis: 106.8 MHz
