= Ici Vaucluse =

ici Vaucluse
- Avignon; France
- Frequencies: 88.6 FM Castellet, 98.8 FM Avignon-le-Pontet, 100.4 FM Avignon-Mont-Ventoux

Programming
- Languages: French, Occitan (some flagship broadcasts)
- Network: ici

Ownership
- Owner: Radio France

History
- First air date: 29 June 1982
- Former names: Radio Vaucluse (1982–2000); France Bleu Vaucluse (2000–2025)

ici Vaucluse is a regional radio station broadcasting in Vaucluse and surrounding areas. It covers regional news, sports, culture, etc. The headquarters are located in Avignon. The station broadcasts 88.6FM for Castellet, 98.8FM for Avignon-le-Pontet and 100.4FM for Avignon-Mont-Ventoux.

== History ==
The station began operating as "Radio Vaucluse" on 29 June 1982, announced 4 days prior. Along with the regional stations, it was brought together on 4 September 2000, and was accordingly renamed "France Bleu Vaucluse" and on 6 January 2025, and was accordingly renamed "ici Vaucluse".

== Programming ==
France Bleu Vaucluse programs are broadcast live from 6 a.m. to 1 a.m., and 4:30 p.m. to 7:30 p.m. Monday to Friday, and from 7 a.m. to 12:30 p.m. and 4 to 7 p.m.on weekends. The national programs are broadcast the rest of the day and night.
