= Ici Provence =

Radio station in France

ici Provence
Aix-en-Provence; France
- Frequencies: 103.6 MHz (Aix-en-Provence); 18 total transmitters
- RDS: ICIPROVE

Programming
- Network: ici

Ownership
- Owner: Radio France

History
- First air date: 1983
- Former names: Radio France Provence (1983–2000); France Bleu Provence (2000–2025)

Links
- Website: francebleu.fr/provence

ici Provence is one of the 44 regional radio stations of the ici network. It serves the departments of Bouches-du-Rhône and Var. It is accessible to as far as Val du Durance and Gapençais via FM radio.

== History ==
The station began broadcasting in 1983 under the name Radio France Provence. It used this name until 4 September 2000, when it became France Bleu Provence. And 6 January 2025, when it became ici Provence.

== Headquarters ==
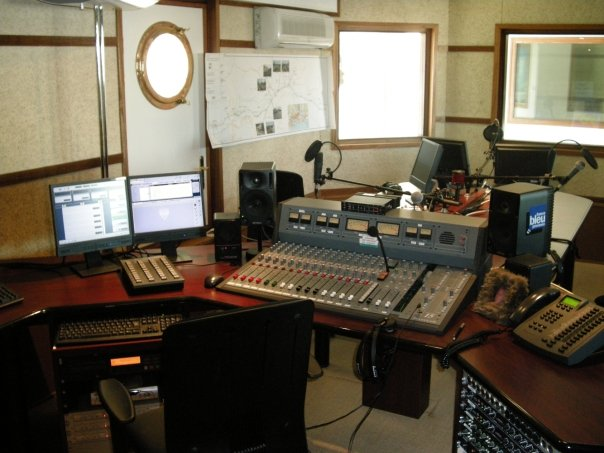
The secondary studio for France Bleu Provence in Toulon

In addition to its headquarters in Aix-en-Provence, France Bleu Provence has offices for its reporters in Toulon and Marseille, on rue de l'Évêché. In the past, the station also had locations in Arles and Martigues during the 2000s.
