= Jean Leymarie =

Jean Leymarie may refer to:

- Jean Leymarie (journalist), French radio journalist
- Jean Leymarie (art historian) (1919–2006), French art historian
- Jean Leymarie (cantalou) (1934-2005), French cantalou Jussac et Crandelles
