= Cantique du chaos =

2025 novel by Mathieu Belezi

Cantique du chaos is a 2025 dystopian novel by Mathieu Belezi.

== Critical reception ==
The novel received largely positive reviews from critics. Mohamed Berkani of France Info described it as "unique, poetic, and powerful."
