= Ici Loire Océan =

ici Loire Océan
Programming
- Language: French

Ownership
- Owner: Radio France
- Sister stations: see ici

History
- First air date: 1985

Links
- Website: francebleu.fr/loire-ocean

ici Loire Océan is a general public radio station which is part of the Radio France group. The station is based in Nantes and covers Loire-Atlantique, Vendée and part of Maine-et-Loire.

== History ==
Created in 1985 under the name "Radio France Loire Océan" and taking advantage of the vacant frequency (101.8 megahertz (2.94 m)) previously occupied by private station Convergence-FM, it is run by Christiane Chadal, and took its current name in 2000. Radio France Loire Océan, banned by the CNCL, is famous throughout the region for its overpowered transmitter and the media profile of its founder Thierry Allio, known as Alain Delmas.

In 2000, under the "Plan Bleu", creating the France Bleu network, it took the name "France Bleu Loire Océan". France Bleu Loire Océan broadcasts more than 12 hours of local programming per day, from 0600h to 1300h , and from 1400h to 1900h .

On 26 June 2015, the micro-local station of La Roche-sur-Yon closed after 10 years of programming specifically for la Vendée between 7h and 9h .

== Local managers ==
- Director : Fabienne Bureau
- Editor in chief : Pascal Roche
- Head of programming : Jean-Marie Gauthier
- Technical director : Stéphane Martin

== Broadcasts ==
The station broadcasts its programming via FM, to the following locations: Châteaubriant, Guémené-Penfao, La Roche-sur-Yon, Les Sables-d'Olonne, Luçon, Nantes, Saint-Nazaire, Angers and Île de Noirmoutier.
