= Ici Gascogne =

ici Gascogne
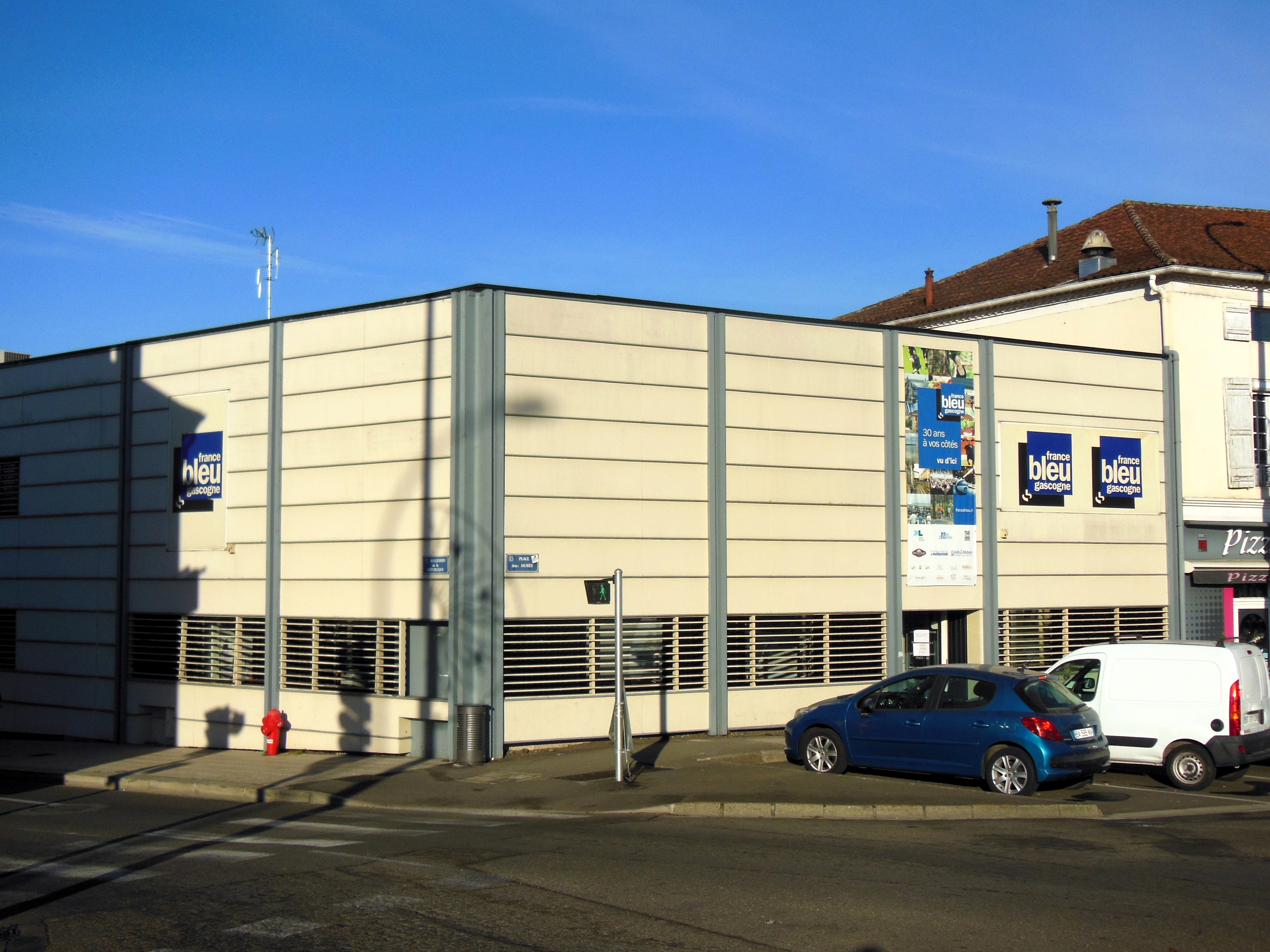
- The Ici Gascogne studios in Mont de Marsan

France
- Broadcast area: Gascogne, Northern Basque Country
- Frequencies: Mont de Marsan: 98.8 FM; Bayonne, Biarritz: 100.5 FM; Mimizan: 103.4 FM

Programming
- Language: French
- Format: News and general music
- Network: see ici

Ownership
- Owner: Radio France

Links
- Website: www.francebleu.fr/gascogne

ici Gascogne is a regional radio station, owned by ici, broadcasting, in general terms, across the historical region of Gascogne, as well as some of the Northern Basque Country alongside the regional equivalent. It covers regional news, culture, sports, etc., and it also features some of its own flagship emissions. Their programming schedule is available on their website. The radio also has its own official Twitter feed, where it discusses interviews and local news.

== History ==
The station was established as an evolution of Radio Landes in 1983. It was limited to covering the department of Landes and some surrounding areas on FM, which was still just emerging as 1st over AM at the time.
