= Ici Pays Basque =

Regional radio station in France

ici Pays Basque

Bayonne; France
- Broadcast area: Iparralde
- Frequencies: 101.3 MHz (Bayonne); 5 total transmitters
- RDS: ICIBASQU

Programming
- Languages: French, Basque
- Format: Generalist, with news and local music
- Network: ici

Ownership
- Owner: Radio France

History
- First air date: 1961
- Former names: Radio Côte Basque (1961–1982); Radio France Pays Basque (1983–2000); France Bleu Pays Basque (2000–2025)

Links
- Website: www.francebleu.fr/pays-basque

ici Pays Basque (Basque: Ici Euskal Herria) is a public service radio station serving Iparralde and the Pyrénées-Atlantiques department of France. Via FM, it is also available in southern Landes, part of Beárn and Gipuzkoa provinces. It's also one of the only Basque language radio stations in France.

== History ==
Radio Côte Basque was born in 1961, under the impetus of two Bayonne journalists, Yves Darriet and Jean Garreto, while the public service was experimenting with its first radio broadcasts in a few regions of France. From the outset, the station broadcast programs in two languages, French and Basque. In 1963, the station broadcast a quarter of an hour of daily local information, the airtime being increased thereafter in 1972, then again in 1975 as recognition for regional languages grew very slowly.

Radio France Pays Basque was created on 1 January 1983. At the end of the same year, the commissioning of the Rhune transmitter enabled it to increase its broadcasting area. Airtime is increased to six hours of daily programs, both in Basque and in French.

On 1 July 1991 Radio France Pays Basque inaugurated a trilingual news service (Basque, French and Spanish) intended for the listeners of Guipuscoa. The motto was: "Radio without borders".

On 4 September 2000 the local radio stations of Radio France were brought together in the France Bleu network, which provided a common national program complemented by regional output. Radio France Pays Basque became France Bleu Pays Basque.

On 6 January 2025 the station changed its name to ici Pays Basque.

== Frequencies ==
ici Pays Basque broadcasts in several different frequencies:

- 103.1 FM - Mauléon-Licharre
- 102.4 FM - Saint-Jean-Pied-de-Port
- 90.4 FM - Saint-Palais
- 90.8 FM - Tardets-Sorholus
- 101.3 FM - Baiona
