= Ici Roussillon =

ici Roussillon
Perpignan; France
- Broadcast area: Pyrénées-Orientales
- Frequency: FM: 101.6 MHz (Perpignan)

Programming
- Language: French
- Network: ici

Ownership
- Owner: Radio France

History
- First air date: 1945
- Former names: Radio Perpignan Roussillon (1945–1975); Radio France Roussillon (1983–2000); France Bleu Roussillon (2000–2025)

Links
- Website: ici Roussillon

ici Roussillon is a public radio station, part of the ici network which is owned by Radio France covering the Pyrénées-Orientales (Roussillon) department. It generally covers local news, across Occitania and in Pyrénées-Orientales. The site features a newsletter, and there is a function available to search what song is playing on the radio.

== Flagship radio shows ==
As with the other local ici radio stations, ici Roussillon also has its own flagship radio shows, covering various topics, such as local news, foods, culture, etc.

These are the following flagship radio shows available, as of April 1, 2022:

- Dans ma rue (In my street) - Monday to Friday, 6.11AM, 8.16AM, and 4.19PM.
- Circuit court en Roussillon (Short circuit in Roussillon) - Monday to Friday, 7.55AM.
- Suivez le guide - Le Mag (Follow the guide - The Magazine) - Sunday at 11.03AM.
