= Carrefour de Lodéon =

French classical music radio program

- Genre: Classical music
- Running time: Circa 120 minutes
- Country of origin: France
- Language: French
- Home station: France Inter (1992–2014); France Musique(2014-2020)
- Syndicates: France Inter (1992–2014); France Musique(sept. 2014-june 2020)
- Hosted by: Frédéric Lodéon
- Original release: 1992 – 2020
- Audio format: Stereo
- Opening theme: William Tell

Carrefour de Lodéon is a French daily classical music radio program by public radio station France Inter and France Musique since September 2014 and hosted by Frédéric Lodéon. It has been broadcast since 1992 from Monday to Thursday from 4 pm to 5 pm (CST) from 1992 to 2014, then from 4 pm to 6 pm (CST) from September 2014 to June 2020 on France Musique. The name of the show is a double entendre: it may refer to the Carrefour de l'Odéon, a square in Paris located in the 6th arrondissement, and the last name of the host.

== History ==
The program name is a pun between the Carrefour de l'Odéon in Paris near the scene of the same name and the surname of Frédéric Lodéon. The show won unprecedented success in the field of classical music, and was awarded the Golden Laurel Club Audiovisual in 1999 and won the Grand Prix. Frédéric Lodéon was named the best radio host in 2001 "Anima 4", awarded by the Community of French-language public radio stations .

== Production ==
- Producer : Frédéric Lodéon
- Charge of production : Régine Barjou / Agnès Cathou / Jean-Charles Diéval
- Production Attachée : Cécile Bonnet des Claustres

== General ==
The theme song of the credits is from the opening of William Tell composed by Gioacchino Rossini interpreted by the Chamber Orchestra of Europe under the direction of Claudio Abbado.
