= Le téléphone sonne =

Le téléphone sonne (The phone's ringing) is a current affairs programme produced by the French generalist public radio network France Inter and broadcast between 7:20pm and 8.00pm on Monday to Friday evenings.

First aired in 1978, the programme consists of a live studio debate between specialist guests on a selected item in the news, to which listeners are invited to contribute by phoning in their questions and opinions – hence the programme's title. The journalist Alain Bédouet was the main presenter of Le téléphone sonne from 1984 to 2012.
