= Ici Béarn Bigorre =

ici Béarn Bigorre

Pau; France
- Broadcast area: Pyrénées-Atlantiques
- Frequency: 102.5 MHz FM (Pau)

Programming
- Language: French

Ownership
- Owner: Radio France
- Sister stations: see ici

History
- First air date: 1980
- Former names: Radio France Béarn (1980–2000); France Bleu Béarn (2000–2020); France Bleu Béarn-Bigorre (2020–2025)

Links
- Website: France Bleu Béarn Bigorre

ici Béarn Bigorre is a regional public radio station part of the French ici network, which is owned by the public state radio service Radio France. It broadcasts and serves the Béarn (Pyrénées-Atlantiques) area. Studios are in Pau.

France Bleu Béarn started broadcasting in the early 1980s under the name Radio France Béarn. On 4 September 2000, 38 local stations of Radio France and Radio Bleue combined to become France Bleu, so Radio France Béarn was renamed to France Bleu Béarn.

In 2017, the station expanded to the Bigorre area with transmitters at Tarbes and Lourdes and renamed itself France Bleu Béarn Bigorre in 2020 to reflect its enlarged service area. And in 2025 France Bleu Béarn Bigorre changed name is "ici Béarn Bigorre".

== Frequencies ==
=== Pyrénées-Atlantiques (64) ===
- Pau : 102.5 MHz
- Arudy : 105.0
- Laruns : 96.4
- Lembeye : 104.8
- Lescun : 102.9
- Oloron-Sainte-Marie : 93.2
- Orthez : 104.8
