= Heartbreaker (2010 film) =

Film by Pascal Chaumeil

- Theatrical release poster
- French: L'Arnacœur
- Directed by: Pascal Chaumeil
- Written by: Laurent Zeitoun; Yohan Gromb; Jeremy Doner
- Produced by: Nicolas Duval-Adassovsky; Laurent Zeitoun; Yann Zenou
- Starring: Romain Duris; Vanessa Paradis; Julie Ferrier; François Damiens; Helena Noguerra; Andrew Lincoln; Jacques Frantz; Jean-Yves Lafesse
- Cinematography: Thierry Arbogast
- Edited by: Dorian Rigal-Ansous
- Music by: Klaus Badelt
- Production companies: Quad Films; Script Associes; Focus Features International; Chaocorp
- Distributed by: Universal Pictures International France (France); Revolver Entertainment (United Kingdom)
- Release dates: 24 January 2010 (L'Alpe d'Huez); 17 March 2010 (France); 2 July 2010 (United Kingdom)
- Running time: 105 minutes
- Countries: France; United Kingdom
- Languages: French; English; Spanish; Japanese; Arabic; Mandarin; Italian; Portuguese
- Budget: €8.7 million
- Box office: $48 million

Heartbreaker (French: L'Arnacœur) is a 2010 romantic comedy film directed by Pascal Chaumeil (in his feature directorial debut) and starring Romain Duris, Vanessa Paradis, Julie Ferrier and François Damiens.

== Plot ==
Alex, his sister Mélanie and her husband Marc operate a unique business for concerned third-party clients - breaking up relationships, but only those in which the woman is "unhappy without realising it", often at the request of a family member or close friend. The trio concoct elaborate, custom and sometimes expensive ruses to deceive the women. After each woman has fallen for his act, Alex tells her she has made him come alive again, but that it is too late for him. The women presumably leave their relationships to seek men who make them feel the way Alex has.

They are hired by a wealthy man, who is a florist and gangster, to prevent the upcoming wedding of his daughter Juliette to Jonathan, a wealthy Englishman of whom he disapproves. However, they only have ten days to do so before the wedding. After the trio conduct an extensive research, it becomes apparent that the couple are truly in love and absolutely perfect for each other, further complicating the task. They also could not find the usual "flaws" in the couple that they use to cause break-ups. Alex initially turns down the job, but massively in debt to a loan shark through his own lavish spending on the business, he is pressured into putting aside his honourable principles to complete the seemingly impossible task with only five days until the wedding.

When Juliette flies to Monte Carlo to prepare for the wedding, Alex poses as her bodyguard in order to gain close and constant access to her, with the trio bugging her hotel room and checking into the adjoining room. While on the job, Alex discovers things that Juliette likes and pretends to like these things as well to impress her, including the film Dirty Dancing, Roquefort cheese and the music of George Michael. The two eventually develop feelings for each other, but the early arrival of Jonathan disrupts Alex's access to Juliette. The night before the wedding, Juliette is restless, so she and Alex sneak out and have a fun night out, including recreating the final dance scene from Dirty Dancing. Early the next morning, Juliette confesses her feelings for him. Alex begins his usual script, but realising he cannot be with her after how he has deceived her, abruptly changes it and says she should get married.

The next day, as the group leave the hotel, Marc inadvertently drops Juliette's case file in front of her. Seeing the surveillance photos and her background information, she realises her father has hired Alex to try to stop the wedding. At the airport, Mélanie, after carefully observing the events of the past few days, chides Alex for walking away from real love to return to an empty life of fake, short-lived affairs. He runs towards the wedding from the airport.

Meanwhile, Juliette's father tells her that while Jonathan is a decent man, she will be bored with him. As they are walking down the aisle, he tells her that Alex refused to take any payment for the contract. Before reaching the end of the aisle, Juliette turns around and flees the ceremony to find Alex. The two reunite and kiss after Alex confesses that he hates Roquefort and George Michael and had never seen Dirty Dancing, is broke and sleeps in his office, but he needs to see her every day.

Back at the "non-wedding", it is revealed that the loan shark to whom Alex owes money actually works for Juliette's father, while Juliette's scheming friend Sophie flirts with Jonathan. Later, Mélanie and Marc alone attempt another ruse, but Marc lacks Alex's charm to pull it off successfully.

== Cast ==
- Romain Duris as Alex Lippi
- Vanessa Paradis as Juliette Van Der Beck
- Julie Ferrier as Mélanie
- François Damiens as Marc
- Helena Noguerra as Sophie
- Andrew Lincoln as Jonathan Alcott
- Jacques Frantz as Van Der Beck, Juliette's father
- Jean-Yves Lafesse as Dutour
- Élodie Frenck as Karine
- Philippe Lacheau as the boyfriend
- Victoria Silvstedt as the lady in the blue Ferrari
- Audrey Lamy as the policewoman

== Production ==
Principal photography began on 5 June 2009 with a week in Morocco, before relocating to Monaco for four weeks, and wrapped on 5 August after three weeks in Paris. Monaco locations included the Monte-Carlo Bay Hotel & Resort and Opéra de Monte-Carlo, and Paris locations included the Place des Victoires and the Hôtel Drouot. Interior scenes were shot at a studio in Saint-Ouen-sur-Seine. The scene where Romain Duris and Vanessa Paradis recreate the final dance sequence from Dirty Dancing was filmed at Chez Gégène, a guinguette in Joinville-le-Pont. Filming also took place at Nice Côte d'Azur Airport, Cannes–Mandelieu Airport and the Rungis International Market.

== Release ==
Heartbreaker had its world premiere as the closing film of the L'Alpe d'Huez International Comedy Film Festival on 24 January 2010. In May 2009, Universal Pictures International France acquired the distribution rights for €3.2 million, and the film was released in France on 17 March 2010. The film had its North American premiere at the City of Lights, City of Angels festival in Los Angeles on 19 April 2010, and was released in select theaters in the United States on 10 September by IFC Films. In the United Kingdom, Heartbreaker was released on 2 July 2010 by Revolver Entertainment.

== Reception ==
=== Box office ===
Heartbreaker grossed $48 million worldwide, including €32.7 million (£26.8 million) in France.

=== Critical response ===
On the review aggregator website Rotten Tomatoes, the film holds an approval rating of 68%, based on 78 reviews, with an average rating of 6.6/10. The website's critics consensus reads, "While definitely on the fluffier side of French comedy, Heartbreaker benefits from never taking itself too seriously – and from the performance of the ever-charming Romain Duris." Metacritic, which uses a weighted average, assigned the film a score of 59 out of 100, based on 22 critics, indicating "mixed or average" reviews.

=== Accolades ===
Award	Category	Recipient	Result
Cabourg Film Festival	Swann d'Or for Best Romantic Comedy	Heartbreaker	Won
César Awards	Best Film	Heartbreaker	Nominated
César Awards	Best Actor	Romain Duris	Nominated
César Awards	Best Supporting Actor	François Damiens	Nominated
César Awards	Best Supporting Actress	Julie Ferrier	Nominated
César Awards	Best First Feature Film	Heartbreaker	Nominated
Globes de Cristal Award	Best Film	Heartbreaker	Won
Globes de Cristal Award	Best Actor	Romain Duris	Nominated
Globes de Cristal Award	Best Actress	Vanessa Paradis	Nominated
Lumière Awards	Best Actor	Romain Duris	Nominated
Magritte Awards	Best Supporting Actor	François Damiens	Nominated
Satellite Awards	Best Actor – Motion Picture	Romain Duris	Nominated

== US remake ==
Following the film's success in France, screenwriter Jeremy Doner announced in May 2010 that Working Title Films had acquired US remake rights.
