= Ici Paris Île-de-France =

ici Paris Île-de-France
- Paris; France
- Broadcast area: Paris, Île-de-France
- Frequency: FM: 107.1 MHz (Paris)
- RDS: __ICI__

Programming
- Language: French

Ownership
- Owner: Radio France
- Sister stations: see ici

History
- First air date: 2 January 2006
- Former names: France Bleu Melun (1980–2006); La City Radio (2002–2006); France Bleu IdF (2006–2009); France Bleu 107.1 (2009–2016); France Bleu Paris (2016–2025)

Links
- Website: www.francebleu.fr/ile-de-france

ici Paris Île-de-France is a public radio station part of the French regional ici network owned by Radio France, created on 2 January 2006. It currently broadcasts in the Île-de-France region, including Paris.

== History ==
Logo of France Bleu 107.1 from 2009 to 2016

On 2 September 2002, the Parisian network France Bleu La CityRadio was created, covering the Paris area.

In January 2006 at 6 AM, the France Bleu networks of La CityRadio (Paris) combined with one of the oldest local stations of Radio France France Bleu Melun (before: Radio France Melun), with this fusion the station changing its name to becoming France Bleu Île-de-France.

Since 31 August 2009, the station has aimed mainly at the latest information on the traffic in the Parisian area. The station changed its name again to France Bleu 107.1. The 107.1 could be interpreted as a reference to 107.7 MHz, a special FM frequency that highway commuters in France can tune in to for traffic information.

The station changed its name to France Bleu Paris in 2016 and to ici Paris Île-de-France in 2025.

== Slogans ==
- 2006 - 2008 : Vivre en bleu c'est mieux
- 2008–2014: Vu d'ici
- Since 2009 : N° 1 sur l'Info-Trafic en Région Parisienne
- 2014–2019: Écoutez, on est bien ensemble
- Since 2020 : Ici, on parle d'ici

== Frequencies ==
=== FM ===
- Paris, Île-de-France : 107.1 MHz; power : 10 kW
- Chartres : 97.3 MHz; power : 4 kW
- Fontainebleau : 103.3; power : 0.2 kW
- Melun : 92.7 MHz; power : 0.3 kW
- Nemours : 101.4 MHz; power : 0.2 kW
- Provins : 92.7 MHz; power : 0.2 kW

== See also ==
- ici
- Radio France
