= Ici (radio network) =

French radio network

- France
- Frequency: FM 87.6–107.3 MHz

Programming
- Language: French
- Format: Adult contemporary, French music, Local news

Ownership
- Owner: Radio France
- Sister stations: France Inter; France Info; France Culture; France Musique; FIP; Mouv'

History
- First air date: 4 September 2000
- Former call signs: Locales de Radio France (1983–2000); Radio Bleue (1980–2000); France Bleu (2000–2025)

Links
- Website: www.ici.fr

Ici (French pronunciation: [isi]; formerly France Bleu [fʁɑ̃s blø]) is a network of local and regional radio stations in France, part of the national public broadcasting group Radio France. The network has a public service mission to serve local audiences and provides local news and content from each of its forty-three stations.

Ici was created as France Bleu in 2000 by a fusion of two older Radio France networks, Les locales de Radio France and Radio Bleue. The flagship station in Paris goes by the name of ici Paris Île-de-France, while the individual stations are each named for their respective coverage areas, usually a département, région, or city. Since 2023, the network has collaborated with the regionalised public television network France 3 on news programmes, which share the Ici branding.

Céline Pigalle has been director of the Ici network since 2023. His predecessors include Philippe Chaffanjon (2012–2013), Anne Brucy (2010–2012), Claude Perrier (2013–2014), Claude Esclatine (2014–2016), Frédéric Schlesinger (ad-interim; 2016), Éric Revel (2016–2018) and Jean-Emmanuel Casalta (2018–2023).

== History ==
=== Disjointed beginnings (1975–2000) ===
==== Les locales de Radio France ====
In 1980, Jacqueline Baudrier, then Chief Director of Radio France created three new experimental local radio stations. Fréquence Nord, Radio Mayenne and Melun FM were created to cover a region, department and a town respectively. These stations were in complement to those already existing under the management of FR3 since 1975, following the break-up of the state broadcaster ORTF. Radio France assumed control of all stations in 1982, with the number of stations reaching 40 by the 1990s.

Its programming was essentially local except for music (which usually came from sister station FIP, or national programming by satellite, called Programme Modulation France), combined with news bulletins from France Inter. These stations were individually called Radio France_____ followed by its coverage area, but were grouped under the name Les locales de Radio France.

==== Radio Bleue ====
Similarly in 1980, Baudrier also launched a new network, this time aimed at the over-50 demographic, called Radio Bleue. It started as a morning-only service which used a national mediumwave network, shared with educational programming. By the 1990s, it expanded its schedule, broadcasting until the evening and secured three FM frequencies from the radio regulator the CSA in three cities: Paris, Cannes, and Valence.

=== Plan Bleu (2000–2010) ===
In 2000, following a review of all radio services, Radio France director, Jean-Marie Cavada, initiated its Plan Bleu, essentially a vast re-organisation of its radio frequencies. Under the plan the local radio stations (Les locales de Radio France) were to be syndicated with Radio Bleue to form one network – the unified France Bleu officially launched on 4 September 2000 at 5:00am CET. Its network of thirty-eight local radio stations were all renamed "France Bleu ______", followed by its broadcast area, to bring the network closer to the Radio France family of stations. Expanding its coverage, local FM frequencies in small to medium-sized towns were re-attributed to France Bleu. Under the same plan frequencies in bigger markets switched to youth network Le Mouv' and FIP stations were drastically cut back to five locations.

News bulletins from France Inter were gradually replaced with its own service, and journalists for the local stations now supply rolling news station France Info with news items, having previously relied on its bigger sister stations for news.

==== Paris region ====
2002 marked the arrival of a dedicated local service for the Paris region, with the launch of La CityRadio de Paris, using the 107.1 frequency from the previous Radio Bleue FM network. Conversely the France Bleu network handed over all of its mediumwave network to France Info.

In 2005 Radio France chief Jeal-Paul Cluzel wished to create a regional station, finding the CityRadio name too limiting, therefore nearby France Bleu Melun based sixty kilometres away was slated for a merger, signalling closure on 16 December 2005 after more than twenty-five years on-air. The combined stations were re-launched as a single service, France Bleu Île-de-France, on 2 January 2006. The name was changed to France Bleu 107.1 in September 2009.

=== Expansion, synergy with France 3 (2010–present) ===
The value of France Bleu was starting to be more widely recognised. In April 2000, the network achieved its record audience, achieving a 7.5% share and 330,000 new listeners, putting the national listenership at under 4 million. In 2010 at the request of French Prime Minister François Fillon, France Bleu Maine, covering Le Mans and La Sarthe was created on 1 June. Mr Fillon is a native of Le Mans. In 2011 it was confirmed that local public radio is to appear in Toulouse. France Bleu Toulouse launched on 23 February and marked a return of local public radio to the city after a 14-year absence. Its previous broadcaster Radio France Toulouse was closed in order to make way for national youth station Le Mouv'. Le Mouv' has since relocated to Paris. The 44th station was launched in September 2013: France Bleu Saint-Etienne Loire. Based in Saint-Etienne, the local radio covers the city of Saint-Etienne, Roanne and a part of La Loire.

In the 2020s, the network began to increase its synergies with France Télévisions' regional network France 3; in 2022, France Bleu announced it would rebrand as "Ici" and operate a shared digital platform with France 3 under the brand. News programmes on France 3 were rebranded under the Ici title, and the two networks introduced the breakfast programme Ici Matin, which is simulcast on radio and television.

== Slogans ==
- 1991–2000: Les locales
- 2000–2002: Toutes les Frances sont sur France Bleu
- 2002–2005: La vie tout en bleu
- 2005–2008: Vivre en bleu, c'est mieux
- 2008–2014: Vu d'ici
- 2014–2019: Écoutez, on est bien ensemble
- 2020–present: Ici, on parle d'ici

== Regional stations and their main frequencies ==
Station coverage around France.

Name of the station	Frequencies	RDS name
ici Alsace	BAS-RHIN (67) : Strasbourg - 101.4; Niederbronn-les-Bains - 99.8; Plaine-Cote - 103.1; Sainte-Marie-aux-Mines - 106.6; Sarre-Union - 107.0; Wissembourg - 94.6; HAUT-RHIN (68) : Saint-Amarin - 101.5; Munster - 104.9; Oderen - 98.5; Mulhouse - 102.6; Masevaux - 101.5; Lapoutroie - 101.5	ICIALSAC
ici Armorique	CÔTES D'ARMOR (22) : Quintin - 102.7; Pleneuf-Val-André - 105.0; Chatelaudren - 93.3; Saint-Brieuc - 104.5; ILLE-ET-VILAINE (35) : Rennes - 103.1; Vitré - 101.6; Redon - 87.9; Fougères - 100.2; MORBIHAN (56) : Josselin - 106.1; La Roche Bernard - 96.2; Rohan - 106.4; Vannes - 101.3	ICIARMOR
ici Auxerre	YONNE (89) : Auxerre - 101.3 et 103.5; Sens - 100.5; Ancy le Franc - 92.5; Tonnerre - 103.5; NIÈVRE (58) : Nevers - 104.0	ICIAUXER
ici Azur	ALPES MARITIMES (06) : Saint-Jean-Cap-Ferrat - 94.4; Nice - 103.8; Menton - 94.8; Utelle - 106.0; Contes - 94.4; VAR (83) : Saint-Raphaël - 100.7	ICI AZUR
ici Béarn Bigorre	Pau 102.5	ICIBEARN
ici Belfort-Montbéliard	Belfort 106.8 Montbéliard 94.6	ICIBELFO
ici Berry	Bourges et le Cher 103.2 Argenton-sur-Creuse 93,5 Issoudun 89,3 Châteauroux 95,2	ICIBERRY
ici Besançon	Besançon 102.8 and 101.4 Vesoul 94.4 Lons-le-Saunier 103.0 Morteau 103.9 Pontarlier 97.2 Ornans 90.3 Saint-Hippolyte 87.6	ICIBESAN
ici Bourgogne	Nuits-Saint-Georges 103.7 Chalon-sur-Saône 103.1 Troyes Les Riceys 87.8	ICIBOURG
ici Breizh Izel	Fréq. Générale 93.0 Quimper 98.6 Brest 99.3 Lorient 90.4 Guingamp 101.4	ICI BZH
ici Champagne-Ardenne	Reims 95.1	ICICHAMP
ici Cotentin	Digosville 100.7	ICICOTEN
ici Creuse	Guéret 94.3 Aubusson 92.4 Auzances 94.8	ICICREUS
ici Drôme Ardèche	Annonay 87.7 Valence 87.9 Montélimar 100.9 Pierrelatte 103.8	ICIDROME
ici Elsass	Only available in streaming internet.	
ici Gard Lozère	Nîmes 90.2	ICIGARD
ici Gascogne	Ascain 100.5	ICIGASC
ici Gironde	Bordeaux 100.1	ICIGIRON
ici Hérault	Montpellier 101.1	ICIHERAU
ici Isère	Doizieux 101.8	ICIISERE
ici La Rochelle	La Rochelle 98.2 Fréq. générale 103.9 Royan 103.6 Saintes 103.9 Angoulême 101.5	ICILAROC
ici Limousin	Limoges 103.5 Nord Haute-Vienne 92.5	ICILIMOU
ici Loire Océan	Nantes 101.8 Fréq. générale 101.8 Saint-Nazaire/La Baule 88.1 Châteaubriant 98.6 La Roche-sur-Yon 93.2 Les Sables-d'Olonne 99.9 Mareuil/Luçon 101.5 Saint-Gilles-Croix-de-Vie 96.9 Angers 88.5	ICI_L-OC
ici Lorraine (Moselle - Pays Haut)	Metz 98.5 Forbach 98.8 Thionville 101.5 Sarreguemines 104.0	ICILORR
ici Lorraine (Meurthe-et-Moselle - Vosges)	Nancy 100.5 Épinal 100.0	ICI SLOR
ici Maine	Le Mans 96.0 Fréq. générale 96.0 La Flèche 91.7 Sablé-sur-Sarthe 105.7	ICIMAINE
ici Mayenne	Sainte-Gemmes-le-Robert 96.6	ICIMAYEN
ici Nord	Valenciennes - 87.7 Lille - 87.8 et 94.7 Maubeuge - 88.1 Dunkerque - 92.6 Boulogne-sur-Mer - 95.5 Etaples - 97.8 Calais - 106.2	ICI NORD
ici Normandie (Calvados - Orne)	Le Plessis-Grimoult 102.6	ICI_NORM
ici Normandie (Seine-Maritime - Eure)	Rouen 100.1 Le Havre 95.1	ICI_NORM
ici Occitanie	Toulouse 91.8 Montauban 97.2 Albi 103.7 Agen 99.4 Rodez 106.2 Auch 96.7 Cahors 97.3 Pamiers 100.7 Villefranche-de-Rouergue 96.2 Saint-Gaudens 96.4 Figeac 90.0	ICIOCCIT
ici Orléans	Orléans 100.9	ICIORLEA
ici Paris Île-de-France	Paris 107.1 Melun & Provins 92.7 Fontainebleau 103.3 Nemours 101.4	__ICI__
ici Pays Basque	Ascain 101.3	ICIBASQU
ici Pays d'Auvergne	Clermont-Ferrand 102.5 et 102.0 Ambert 99.5 Aurillac 100.2 Moulins 99.9 Montluçon 96.7 Saint-Flour 100.1	ICIAUVER
ici Pays de Savoie	SAVOIE (73) : Chambéry 103.9 Lescheraines 88.8 Montmélian 103.9 Albertville 103.9 Saint Jean de Maurienne 103.6 Modane 103.6 Bonneval-sur-Arc 103.9 Val-d'Isère 103.9 HAUTE-SAVOIE (74) : Annecy 95.2 Gex (Lake Geneva) 106.1 Chatel 93.8 La Forclaz 106.7 Cluses 107.3 Combloux 105.9 Morzine 103.6 Saint-Gervais-les-Bains 103.9 Megève 106.4 Chamonix 100.5	ICISAVOI
ici Périgord	Audrix 99.0 Périgueux 99.3 Limoges - Nord Dordogne 91.7	ICIPERIG
ici Picardie	OISE (60) : Noyon - 94.4 Beauvais - 106.8 SOMME (80) : Montdidier - 93.2 Gamaches - 103.3 Amiens - 100.2 Poix-de-Picardie - 101.8 Doullens - 88.1 Sailly-Saillisel - 102.8 Abbeville - 100.6	ICIPICAR
ici Poitou	Fréq. générale 106.4 Poitiers 87.6 Niort 101.0 Châtellerault 103.3	ICIPOITO
ici Provence	Marseille 103.6 Toulon 102.9	ICIPROVE
ici RCFM	Bastia 101.7 Ajaccio 97.0 / 100.5	ICI RCFM
ici Roussillon	Sorède 101.6	ICIROUSS
ici Saint-Étienne Loire	Saint-Étienne 97.1 Roanne 100.2 Le Puy-en-Velay 101.1	ICISTETI
ici Touraine	Tours 105.0	ICI_TOUR
ici Vaucluse	Grand Avignon 98.8 Vaucluse 100.4 Sud Luberon 88.6	ICIVAUCL
