= Ici Nord =

ici Nord
- Lille; France
- Broadcast area: Nord-Pas-de-Calais
- Frequency: see frequencies

Programming
- Language: French

Ownership
- Owner: Radio France
- Sister stations: see ici

History
- First air date: 19 May 1980
- Former names: Fréquence Nord (1980–1992); Radio France Fréquence Nord (1992–2000); France Bleu Nord (2000–2025)

Links
- Website: https://www.francebleu.fr/nord

ici Nord is a French public radio station part of the Ici network for the departments of Nord and Pas-de-Calais.

== History ==
ici Nord was established on 19 May 1980 and was dubbed Fréquence Nord by Radio France journalist Jacqueline Baudrier.

On September 4, 2000, 38 local stations of Radio France and Radio Bleue partnered together to become France Bleu. After this, the name of Radio France-Fréquence Nord changed to France Bleu Nord.

On January 6, 2024, the name of France Bleu Nord changed to ici Nord.

== Frequencies ==
=== Nord (59) ===
- Dunkerque : 92.6 MHz
- Lille : 87.8 MHz (city), 94.7 MHz (Nord)
- Maubeuge : 88.1 MHz
- Valenciennes : 87.7 MHz

=== Pas-de-Calais (62) ===
- Auxi-le-Château : 95.6 MHz
- Boulogne-sur-Mer : 95.5 MHz
- Calais and Dover: 106.2 MHz
- Étaples : 97.8 MHz
- Marconne : 94.3 MHz

=== Belgium ===
ici Nord can also be heard clearly in the south-west area of Belgium:

- Bruges : 94.7 MHz
- Courtray : 94.7 MHz
- Mons : 88.1 MHz
- Mouscron : 87.8 MHz, 94.7 MHz
- Tournai : 94.7 MHz
- Ypres : 87.8 MHz, 94.7 MHz
