= Mouv' =

French youth-oriented radio station

France
- Broadcast area: France

Programming
- Language: French
- Format: Urban music, French music

Ownership
- Owner: Radio France
- Sister stations: France Inter; France Info ici France Culture; France Musique; FIP

Links
- Website: www.mouv.fr

Mouv' (lit. 'Movement') (formerly Le Mouv') is a French youth-oriented radio station which began broadcasting on 17 June 1997. As part of Radio France, it is a public radio station. The station primarily plays youth-oriented music, centered on urban music and hip hop. Initially based in Toulouse, it moved to Paris in December 2001. It relaunched on 2 February 2015 with its slogan Mouv on it. Previously the radio station assumed an alternative rock identity, its slogan L'esprit Rock was a way of life and a style as well as a type of music.

== History ==
=== Radio 7 (1980–1988) ===
Le Mouv' is Radio France's second attempt at serving a young audience. Its first, Radio 7 was created on 2 June 1980. Radio 7 was launched to counteract the numerous radios libres and pirate stations which heralded the opening of the FM band to private operators initiated by then President François Mitterrand in 1981. Radio 7 had a commercial-free rock-based format. It closed down in 1988, with its Paris transmitter converted into a rolling news format, the first of its kind in Europe, called France Info.

=== Le Mouv' – The new project (1997–2000) ===
A second attempt was to be launched in 1997. Michel Boyon, then president of Radio France, remarked that the average age of the public radio audience was progressively getting older. Enlisting the help of Olivier Nanteau, on 17 June 1997, Le Mouv' launched, in place of Radio France Toulouse which closed down. At the same time it also signalled the end of local public programmes as Le Mouv' aimed to become a national station. The launch of a public youth station was criticised by private radio groups, which stated that Radio France had no business entering commercial markets.

At the start of programmes, Le Mouv' initially had an eclectic format, mixing pop, rock and electronic dance music mixed with practical information for its young audience. By 1998 the media regulator CSA attributed 21 new FM frequencies to the network in small to medium-sized towns (such as Angers, Poitiers, Valence).

1999 saw Radio France President Jean-Marie Cavada give Le Mouv' six months to improve the audience share, which in Toulouse, remained static at 0.6%. However other stations within the Radio France group were threatened with closure, especially several FIP stations outside Paris, for example FIP Lyon. Station manager Marc Garcia changed strategy by installing a new, stable schedule with a new musical format, centered on the new rock music scene, adding a new slogan, L'esprit rock (The spirit of rock), with the result of gaining a 1.8% share in the Toulouse area.

==== Out of the towns, into the cities (2000–2002) ====
Radio France put in place a vast re-organisation of its frequencies for the year 2000. In its Plan Bleu it outlined, amongst other things, that Le Mouv' would be heard in larger markets, with significant university populations. Le Mouv's coverage area in the smaller towns of France were to be handed over to the France Bleu network of local stations, whilst FIP stations in the bigger cities were to be closed for Le Mouv'. Le Mouv' thus appeared in Marseille, Lille, Lyon, Nantes, as well as Ajaccio, Brest, Rennes and Valence. This suscitied a number of protests in the cities concerned. Audience share in Toulouse reached 3.4% by 2001. A new frequency for Clermont-Ferrand came on-air in November 2001, followed by strong protests from private radio groups. However Radio France announced the arrival of Le Mouv' in Paris, backed up by a visible marketing campaign. TDF Transmitter work aimed at improving Radio France network stations on FM made it possible to re-utilise frequencies already used by France Musiques. Le Mouv' started broadcasts in the Paris region on 6 December 2001 with its first private concert held in March 2002. This gave the station a potential coverage of 16 million people, with 100,000 listeners in its first set of results in 2003.

==== Going digital (2002–2010) ====
October 2002 marked the station's fifth birthday and a new logo for the network was unveiled. However, after five years at the helm station manager Marc Garcia left in 2002 to take another role within Radio France. A new frequency in the Lozère region was re-activated after indignation of the network being removed in favour of France Bleu Gard Lozère. Frédéric Schlesinger took over the running of Le Mouv' in 2003. In 2004 the station achieved its first national audience share of 1.1%, which is close to 550,000 listeners. The figure rose in 2005 with 650,000 national listeners and a 1.3% share. In Paris-Île-de-France it achieved a 1.3% share.

New frequencies for the station were opened in Montpellier in 2006, Bordeaux and Lorient 2007, Besançon and Rouen in 2008 and in Tours in 2010. Future frequencies have been cleared for Amiens, Grenoble, Annecy and Saint-Étienne. Le Mouv' launched its first La Mouv'Party tour, which took place in Nantes, Bordeaux, Lille and Bordeaux before ending in Paris on 7 March 2008. In 2009 le Mouv' launched its current website, offering audio on-demand for the first time.

Facing falling audience share (0.7% nationally by 2009), Le Mouv' reduced its music quota from 90% to 70%. Station director Hervé Riesen declared that Le Mouv' was "no longer a music station, but musically dominant", adding it is moving away from its previous 18-25 demographic, now aiming to target 18–30-year-olds with more speech and discussion programmes.

In June 2010 Radio France president Jean-Luc Hees addressed in an open letter to staff in Toulouse plans for Le Mouv' to relocate to Maison de la Radio in Paris, home of Radio France network operations. The move was completed in December, bringing an end to 14 years of broadcasting from Toulouse, and ending the policy of national public broadcasting outside the French capital. Meanwhile, rumours of an expansion of the France Bleu local network in the Toulouse area were rife, after Mr Hees addressed staff in Toulouse three days after the launch of France Bleu Maine in Le Mans. The rumours were confirmed in February 2011, when France Bleu Toulouse launched, with ex-Mouv' station manager Vincent Rodriguez named station director. Mr Hees additionally wanted Le Mouv' to double its audience, stating it rarely climbed above the 1% national mark, remarking that after 13 years, it "isn't addressing the audience it is aiming for".

==== Unstable times (2010–2015) ====
In 2012, Le Mouv' reached 215,000 listeners (0.6% share), with 31 transmitters covering a potential 32 million people. However the following year saw it fall towards a 0.5% share. Since 2009 its share has never reached higher than 1%, with the station's record audience reaching 1.3% in 2004.

According to Les Echos, Le Mouv represented 2.6% of Radio France's total expenditure in 2013 (15 million euro). Media personality Arthur, then owner of Paris-based Oui FM proposed to merge Le Mouv' with his station, prompting a response from station director Joël Ronez, affirming that public service broadcasting was 'not for sale' and not a bank of transmitters for private operators to profit from'

In its report of 2013, media regulator CSA noted the frequent editorial changes contributed to eroding the station's audience, recommending parent group Radio France to stabilise itself in order to have Mouv' find an audience.

Le Mouv' stunted for a month, playing continuous music with a few news flashes. Following the Charlie Hebdo shooting it provided a special programme on 9 January 2015, two days after the attack

=== Mouv' – new name, new format (2015–present) ===
Radio France registered the trademark "Mouv'" and its new slogan "Mouv on it" with the French Intellectual property office on 23 December 2014.

On 2 February at midnight, Le Mouv' changed its name to become simply Mouv', with a new musical format focused of hip-hop and urban culture. It was set the goal of reaching 1% share of national listening, (approximately 500,000 listeners) before December 2016.

In Radio France's audit report of April 2015, it was revealed that the station never reached its listenership target share of 1.5%, last achieved in 2009; the average age of their listener rose from 28 to 34 and the cost of running the station almost doubled (from 4.5 million euro in 2004 to 8.7 million euro in 2013). The report also outlined that the station's attempt to emulate France Inter's format under the stewardship of Patrice Blanc-Francard was a failure, and noted its frequent changes of direction cued a loss of listeners, whilst its running costs rose. One of its recommendations was to transform Mouv' into a web radio station.

For the first four months of 2015 (and its last two as "Le Mouv'), ratings for the station rose from 0.6% to 0.9% share, yet its online listenership fell by 22% for the same period, according to audience measurement service, OJD.

Matthieu Gallet, President Director-General of Radio France explained, in front of the Senate that wishes to keep running Mouv', even though the costs of its national FM network was 'non-negligible'. Gallet gave the station 18 months to find its target audidence, with the option of removing Mouv' from FM to become digital-only, either in the form of a web radio station or via digital radio (even though Radio France is currently absent from DAB).

In September 2015, Mouv' updated its English slogan to "Hip Hop no limit". It was only used for two months, then replaced by the current one, "Hip Hop never stop".

On 2 July 2016, Mouv', Radio France Philharmonic Orchestra and Adami presented Hip Hop Symphonique, a one-off concert getting together symphonic music and French rap. For the first time this unique creation joined five emblematic artists of the French rap scene together: IAM, Youssoupha, Ärsenik, Bigflo & Oli and Mc Solaar, accompanied by Radio France Philharmonic Orchestra under the artistic direction of Issam Krimi.

== Frequencies ==
City	Frequency
Aix-en-Provence	96.4 MHz
Ajaccio	92.0 MHz
Amiens	91.0 MHz
Angers	96.0 MHz
Annecy	99.4 MHz
Besançon	93.5 MHz
Brest	94.0 MHz
Bordeaux	87.7 MHz
Caen	87.8 MHz
Cannes	101.0 MHz
Carcassonne	90.0 MHz
Clermont-Ferrand	97.5 MHz
Dijon	88.9 MHz
Grenoble	95.5 MHz
Lille	91.0 MHz
Limoges	107.6 MHz
Lorient	103.3 MHz
Lyon	87.8 MHz
Marseille	96.8 MHz
Mende	107.2 MHz
Montpellier	102.7 MHz
Nantes	96.1 MHz
Nice	101 MHz
Paris et Île-de-France	92.1 MHz
Reims	101.1 MHz
Rennes	107.3 MHz
Rouen	95.8 MHz
Saint-Étienne	88.0 MHz
Toulouse	95.2 MHz
Tours	94.1 MHz
Valence	100.7 MHz

== Slogans ==
Unlike all the other French stations, Mouv's slogans are some English-speaking (since January 2015).

- March 1999 - August 1999 : L'Esprit Rock
- August 2009 - September 2011 : L'Alternative Radio
- September 2011 - February 2015 : Mon époque, ma radio
- February 2015 - September 2015 : Mouv' on it
- September 2015 - November 2015 : Hip Hop no limit
- Since November 2015 : Hip Hop never stop

== See also ==
- BBC Radio 1, British equivalent aimed at 18–30 year olds.
- CBC Radio 3 and Bande à part, Canadian equivalents featuring Canadian content.
- BBC 6 Music, British station with an Adult Album Alternative format.
- DRS Virus, Couleur 3 and Rete Tre, Swiss public stations aimed at a young audience.
- Antena 3, Portuguese equivalent.
- Triple J, Australian equivalent.
- FM4, Austrian radio station with an alternative rock format.
- Studio Brussel, Belgian Dutch station.
- 5fm, South African equivalent.
