= Jean Leymarie (journalist) =

French radio journalist

Jean Leymarie is a French radio journalist who takes the Saturday morning and Sunday evening news slots on France Info.

With a diploma from the Centre de formation des journalistes, Jean Leymarie started at France Info in 2001. After time in "Reportages", he joined "Économie et social". He presented "Une de l’économie", morning edition, for 4 years, from September 2001 to June 2005.
