= France Info (radio network) =

French all-news national radio network

- Paris; France
- Broadcast area: Worldwide
- Frequencies: 105.5 MHz (Paris); 105.3 MHz (Marseille); 103.4 MHz (Lyon); Frequencies

Programming
- Language: French
- Format: All-news radio

Ownership
- Owner: Radio France; France Télévisions
- Sister stations: France Inter ici France Culture; France Musique; FIP; Mouv'

History
- First air date: June 1, 1987; 39 years ago

Links
- Website: www.franceinfo.fr

France Info (French pronunciation: [fʁɑ̃s ɛ̃fo]) is a radio network operated by the French public service radio broadcaster Radio France with involvement of France Télévisions. It provides continuous live news and information.

Broadcasting on FM (as well as being streamed on the internet), France Info is receivable across France and audible too in the border regions of neighbouring countries, including southern parts of the United Kingdom, especially the southeastern coastal region of England.

== History ==
France Info was founded in 1987 by Roland Faure and Jérôme Bellay. Year on year its audience has grown, notably after the social conflicts of 1995, 2003, and 2006. It is frequently estimated to be the fourth largest French radio network in terms of listener numbers, after RTL, NRJ and France Inter.

France Info has offices in Paris, Lyon, Marseille, and Toulouse, and also makes use of local-news input from the France Bleu network.

== Journalists and presenters ==
- David Abiker
- Sophie Auvigne
- Matthieu Beauval
- Gilbert Chevalier
- Jérôme Colombain
- Olivier de Lagarde
- Raphaëlle Duchemin
- Olivier Émond
- Jean-Pierre Gauffre
- Anne-Élisabeth Lemoine
- Chloé Leprince
- Jean Leymarie (journalist)
- Marie-Ève Malouines
- Marie-Odile Monchicourt
- Benjamin Muller
- Grégory Philipps
- Richard Place
- Catherine Pottier
- Bernard Thomasson
- Philippe Vandel

== Frequencies ==
=== FM ===
Main transmitters:

- Bar-le-Duc (Willeroncourt) 104.5 MHz
- Bastia (Serra di Pigno) 105.5 MHz
- Bayonne (La Rhune) 105.5 MHz
- Charleville-Mézières (Sury) 105.9 MHz
- Clermont-Ferrand (Puy-de-Dôme) 105.5 MHz
- Le Mans (Mayet) 105.5 MHz
- Lille (Bouvigny le Mont) 105.2 MHz
- Lyon (Mont Pilat) 103.4 MHz
- Marseille (Petite Étoile) 105.3 MHz
- Metz (Luttange) 106.8 MHz
- Mulhouse (Belvédère) 105.5 MHz
- Nice (Mont Chauve) 105.7 MHz
- Paris (Tour Eiffel) 105.5 MHz
- Perpignan (Pic de Neulos) 105.1 MHz
- Reims (TDF Hautvillers) 105.5 MHz
- Strasbourg (TDF Nordheim) 104.4 MHz
- Vannes (Moustoir-Ac) 105.5 MHz

=== Former mediumwave frequencies ===
These frequencies were de-activated at midnight local time on the night of 31 December 2015, except for Lyon and Rennes: Rennes transmitter continued to broadcast until 2 January 2016 0900 UTC, while Lyon continued to broadcast until midnight on 4 January 2016, for the Holy Mass for the sick held by Notre Dame des Ondes on Sunday 3 January.

- Bayonne (Camps de Prats) 1494 kHz; Power : 4 kW
- Lyon (Tramoyes) 603 kHz; Power : 300 kW
- Bordeaux (Néac) 1206 kHz; Power : 100 kW
- Brest (Quimerc'h) 1404 kHz; Power : 20 kW
- Clermont-Ferrand (Ennezat) 1494 kHz; Power : 20 kW
- Dijon (Couternon) 1404 kHz; Power : 5 kW
- Lille (Camphin-en-Carembault) 1377 kHz; Power : 300 kW
- Marseille (Réaltor) 1242 kHz; Power : 150 kW
- Nice (Fontbonne) 1557 kHz; Power : 150 kW
- Rennes (Thourie) 711 kHz; Power : 300 kW

== Logos and symbols ==
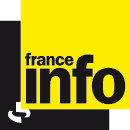
Former logo of the station, from September 2008 to 29 August 2016.

Logo of the station as of 29 August 2016.
