= Jean-Yves Lafesse =

French actor and humorist (1957–2021)

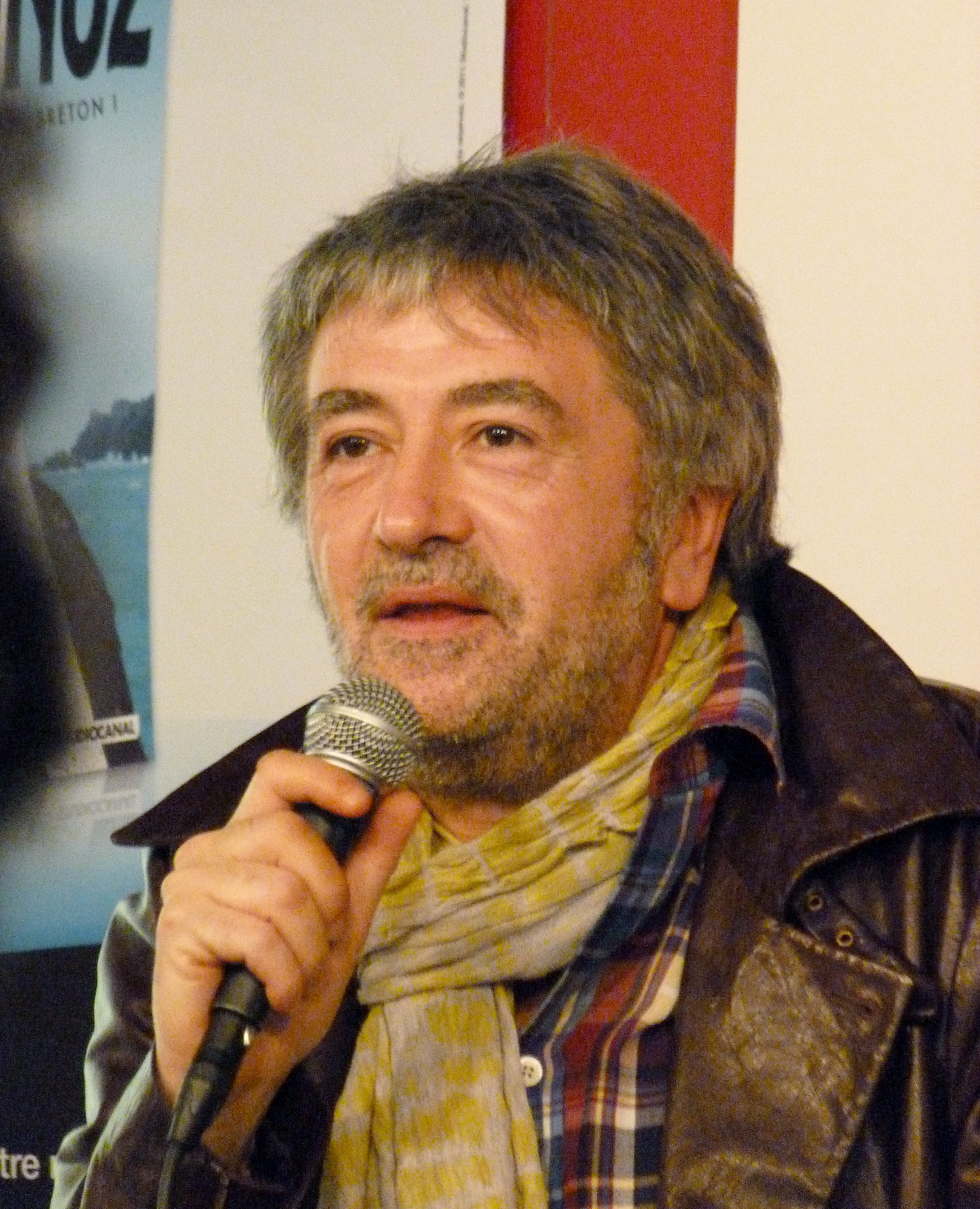
- Lafesse in 2011
- Born: Jean-Yves Lambert; 13 March 1957; Pontivy, France
- Died: 22 July 2021 (aged 64); Vannes, France
- Occupations: Actor; Humorist

Jean-Yves Lafesse, stage name of Jean-Yves Lambert (13 March 1957 – 22 July 2021), was a French actor and humorist. He was known for making prank calls, as well as hidden camera pranks.

== Biography ==
Lafesse was born in Pontivy. He left Brittany in 1974. He travelled for four years through Djibouti, Italy, and England, where he joined the punk counterculture in 1976. During his youth, he was a footballer for Stade pontivyen, and he played as a defender.

Lafesse studied film at the Conservatoire libre du cinéma français from 1978 to 1981. In 1981, he became a radio show host for Radio libre, Radio Carbone 14, and Kiss FM. In 1984, he joined Radio Nova, for which he began making prank calls.

In 1985, Lafesse joined Europe 1 and Canal+, as well as France 2, TF1, France 3, M6, Paris Première, and Télévision Suisse Romande for the radio show Lafestival. For France Régions 3, he hosted a show called Radio carotte, in which he pranked passersby through placing a carrot in their hands. He became known for using his pinky finger as an imitation microphone.

Lafesse published two books: Les Grandes Impostures téléphoniques in 1992 and Petit Précis de l'imposture in 1994. In 2000, he launched a website called Uniqueaumonde.com, which allowed users to see his pranks on the internet. He played the character Commissioner San-Antonio in two audiobooks, adapted from novels by Frédéric Dard (La Rate au court-bouillon and Votez Bérurier).

On 28 March 2014, Lafesse appeared on a stage for the first time in a production of Lafesse en réhet, a show he had written. It was shown at the Palais des congrès de Pontivy in front of 700 people. That same year, he played Pierre Dac in La Guerre des ondes, a telefilm broadcast by France 3. After a period of silence, he moved to Saint-Germain-en-Laye in 2019 and organized sketches there, as well as in Poissy. Later that year, he left the Paris area and moved back to Brittany. He was recruited by the radio station France Bleu Breizh Izel for the 2019–2020 season, broadcasting humorous tales he wrote with his brother.

Jean-Yves Lafesse died of ALS in Vannes on 22 July 2021 at the age of 64.

== Filmography ==
=== Cinema ===
- Carbone 14, le film (1983)
- Baby Blood (1990)
- Comme une bête (1998)
- Chili con carne (1999)
- Heartbreaker (2010)
- Roxane (2019)

=== Television ===
- J'arrive ! (1982)
- La Classe américaine (1993)
- La Guerre des ondes (2014)
- Tom-Tom et Nana (2019)
- Murders in... (2020)

== Publications ==
- Les Grandes Impostures téléphoniques (1992)
- Petit Précis de l'imposture (1994)
- Mes impostures (2011)
- Punk Mamy (2019)
