= France Culture =

French national radio station

- Paris; France
- Frequencies: 93.5 MHz (Paris); 99.0 MHz (Marseille); 88.8 MHz (Lyon); Frequencies

Programming
- Language: French
- Format: Spoken word (culture, current affairs)

Ownership
- Owner: Radio France
- Sister stations: France Inter; France Info; ici; France Musique; FIP; Mouv'

History
- First air date: 1944; 82 years ago
- Former names: Programme National (1945–1958); France III (1958–1963); RTF Promotion (1963)

Links
- Website: www.franceculture.fr

France Culture (French pronunciation: [fʁɑ̃s kyltyʁ]) is a French public radio channel and part of Radio France. Its programming encompasses various features on historical, philosophical, sociopolitical, and scientific themes (including debates, discussions, and exciting documentaries), as well as literary readings, radio plays, and experimental productions. The channel is broadcast nationwide on FM and is also available online.

== Some landmark programmes ==
- Atelier de création radiophonique (since 1969)
- Black and Blue (1970–2008)
- Le Bon plaisir (1985–1999)
- Le Panorama (since 1968)
- Les Chemins de la connaissance (1970–1997)
- Les Chemins de la musique (1997–2004)
- Du jour au lendemain (1985–2014)
- La Matinée des autres (1977–2002)
- Les Nuits magnétiques (1977–1999)
- Une vie, une œuvre (since 1984)

== Directors ==
- Agathe Mella (1973–1975)
- Yves Jaigu (1975–1984)
- Jean-Marie Borzeix (1984–1997)
- Patrice Gélinet (1997–1999)
- Laure Adler (1999–2005)
- David Kessler (2005–2008)
- Bruno Patino (2008–2010)
- Olivier Poivre d'Arvor (2010–2015)
- Sandrine Treiner (August 2015 – 2023)
- Emelie De Jong (2023 – present)
