= FIP (radio station) =

French radio network

- France

Programming
- Language: French

Ownership
- Owner: Radio France
- Sister stations: France Inter; France Info; ici; France Culture; France Musique; Mouv'

History
- First air date: 5 January 1971; 55 years ago
- Former names: France Inter Paris

Links
- Website: www.radiofrance.fr/fip

FIP (pronounced [fip]; originally France Inter Paris) is a French radio network founded in 1971. It is part of the Radio France group.

== Concept ==
The concept behind FIP has scarcely changed since its founding: commercial-free music interrupted only briefly for occasional announcements about forthcoming cultural events (and, before 2020, traffic updates & short news bulletins). Currently, live broadcasts, from Paris, are from 7 am to 11 pm. During off-hours, a computer replays music programming from previous days.

All music programming is hand-picked by a small team of curators, who create three-hour blocks of music. They abide by a few rules, most notably paying close attention to how tracks transition from one to the other, across genres and styles, and especially making sure that a song is never played twice in a 48-hour window. FIP broadcasts around 16,000 artists and 44,000 different songs every year; 85% of its programming comes from independent labels.

The short news bulletin at 10 minutes before the hour was conceived so that listeners interested in hearing more details could tune in to France Inter (or other stations) at the top of the hour; this was removed in June 2020, citing the saturation of news in the media ecosystem. Likewise, traffic updates, relevant to Paris, had been removed in 2008.

== Music broadcasts ==
The programming features all types of music genres including chanson, classical, film music, jazz, pop rock, world music and blues, but with careful attention paid to smooth and unobtrusive transition from one song to the other (for example, the rock and roll song Roll Over Beethoven can be preceded by a short sonata of Beethoven). FIP is one of the few stations in the world to transmit this type of programming around the clock. All of the songs are hand-picked by expert programmers. Some famous ones include Patrick Tandin, Julien Delli Fiori and Alexandre Marcellin. The first programmer was Anne Marie Leblond. Currently there are seven programmers: Armand Pirrone, Luc Frelon, Patrick Derlon, Christian Charles, René Hardiagon, Jean-Yves Bonnardel and Alexandre Desurmont.

The station broadcasts presenter-led programs during several evening hours:

- 7pm-8pm: Club Jazzafip with Jane Villenet (Mon-Thu) and Charlotte Bibring (Fri-Sun)
- 8pm-10pm:
  - Monday: Sous les jupes de Fip with Emilie Blon-Metzinger and Luc Frelon
  - Tuesday: C'est Magnifip! with Frédérique Labussière
  - Wednesday: Certains l'aiment Fip with Susana Poveda
  - Thursday: Live à Fip with Stéphanie Daniel

== History ==
The station was founded on 5 January 1971 at 5 p.m. by the head of radio-télévision Roland Dhordain and two producers from France Inter, Jean Garetto and Pierre Codou, both week-end presenters at France Inter. It was broadcast from Paris on 514 m (585 kHz) medium wave, hence its original name of France Inter Paris 514. It was noted for its particular style of programming and its hosts' sugary tone of voice as they described traffic problems with humour and irony.

After Paris, the station was emulated in other cities (Lyon, Marseille, and so forth), which broadcast the same music and news with local traffic conditions and events. The P in FIP changed according to the location: FIB, FIL, FIM, and so on. As with Radio France in general, FIP moved to FM and stereo.

Given its role as a niche player in French public broadcasting, FIP was largely untouched by the changes in the French radio landscape starting in 1981. In 1999 Jean-Marie Cavada, the president of Radio France launched a restructuring called "Plan Bleu", which reassigned frequencies among local stations, Radio Bleue, Urgences, Le Mouv', and FIP. FIP lost the stations which had smaller audiences: the stations at Metz and Nice became part of the France Bleu network. Despite listener protests, the plan was adopted on 24 May 2000.

In December 2019, Radio France decided that the short news bulletins at 10 minutes before the hour would cease, and that the local studios in Bordeaux, Nantes, and Strasbourg would close in July 2020. The COVID-19 pandemic delayed this change to December 2020.

== Frequencies ==
FIP broadcasts in France as follows:

- Paris/Île-de-France: 105.1 MHz
- Bordeaux: 96.7 MHz/Arcachon: 96.5 MHz
- Montpellier: 99.7 MHz
- Nantes: 95.7 MHz/Saint-Nazaire: 97.2 MHz
- Strasbourg: 92.3 MHz
- Marseille: 90.9 MHz
- Rennes: 101.2 MHz
- Toulouse: 103.5 MHz

FIP also streams over the Internet, which gives FIP a global audience.

FIP's mediumwave broadcasts on 585 kHz in Paris (between 0800–1600 Central European Time from a transmitter in Romainville) ceased on 3 January 2011.

FIP is available in Europe on free-to-air digital satellite on Atlantic Bird 3 at 5.0°West and Astra at 19.2°East. The latter feed returned in January 2009 after a contractual break. FIP was also available from Hot Bird 7A at 13.0°East, but after a conflict between Radio France and CanalSat, distribution ceased on 1 July 2008.

FIP is available off the ASTRA satellite at 19.2°East frequency 12285 MHz symbol rate 29700 kS, polarity V. It can also be received in Western Australia, Tahiti and surrounding islands from Intelsat 701 at 180.0°East.

In the Netherlands, FIP is available via Ziggo cable (at 106.1 MHz) and channel 857 via Ziggo's digital receivers. Ziggo supplies cable services for over 40 percent of the households in the Netherlands.

== The network ==
The different elements of the FIP network since its creation:

Successive names	Location	Inauguration	Off air	Closure
FIP; FIP Paris	Paris	1971	–	–
FIB; FIP Bordeaux	Bordeaux	1972	–	–
FIL; FIP Lille	Lille	1972	–	2000
FIL; FIP Lyon	Lyon	1972	–	2000
FIM; FIP Marseille; FIP	Marseille	1972	2000–2008	–
FIC; FIM; FIP Metz	Metz	1972	–	2000
FIR; FIP Reims	Reims	1972	–	1988
FIT; FIP	Toulouse	1973	1984–2008	–
FILA; FIP Nantes	Nantes	1974	–	–
FILA; FIP Nantes	St Nazaire		–	–
FIS; FIP Strasbourg	Strasbourg	1978	–	–
FICA; FIP Côte d’Azur	Nice	1982	–	2000
FIP Tours	Tours	1985	–	1988
FIP	Montpellier	2006	–	–
FIP	Arcachon	2008	–	–
FIP	Rennes	2008	–	–

== Slogans ==
- 1973–1995: "La radio de toutes les musiques" (The radio of all music)
- 1995–2011: "Respirez, vous êtes sur FIP" (Breathe, you are on FIP)
- 2006–2011: "105.1% musique" (105.1% music) (for Paris)
- 2011–2012: "FIP, 40 ans d'évasion" (FIP, 40 years of escape)
- 2015–2016: "Des nouveaux rendez-vous" (New encounters)
- Since 2017: "Vous n'êtes plus là, vous êtes sur FIP" (You're no longer there, you're on FIP)

== Brighton, UK pirate relays ==
According to the Brighton's The Argus newspaper, a Brighton resident re-broadcast FIP for nearly ten years on two frequencies (91.0 and 98.5 MHz) in the FM band. The two signals, which were relays of FIP from satellite could be heard in many parts of Brighton. The two transmitters were operated to serve different parts of the city, one of them allegedly being in the Kemptown area of the city. The station had proved very popular.

The two signals operated on frequencies originally used by FIP at Lille and Metz, which were unused in the Brighton area and caused no interference to existing national or local stations. Technical quality was very high and the Radio Data System (RDS) identification was F_I_P with the two signals linked to ensure best reception on an RDS car radio. The program identification codes of the RDS appeared to be the same as those used on the real French transmitters.

The rebroadcasts broke UK broadcast rules enforced by UK telecom, radio and TV regulator Ofcom. Although it is believed that Ofcom officials visited the address of the station operator and confiscated the equipment, thus taking the pirate broadcasts off the air, the station could still be heard on one of the original frequencies, 91.0 MHz, throughout the city until 2012 and the UK relay operator decided to cease broadcasting FIP to Brighton due to the continued attention from Ofcom.

An appreciation society for fans of FIP, Vive la FIP, meets regularly in Brighton; some members even visited the Paris studios of FIP and were featured in an article in the French listings magazine Télérama in February 2007.

In July 2026, a rebroadcast of FIP started in the Cheshire/Merseyside area of the UK on 87.7MHz.
