= France Musique =

French public radio station

- France
- Broadcast area: France

Programming
- Language: French
- Format: Classical; Jazz

Ownership
- Owner: Radio France
- Sister stations: France Inter; France Info ici France Culture; FIP; Mouv'

History
- First air date: 1954; 72 years ago
- Former call signs: Chaîne Haute-Fidélité (1954–1958); France IV Haute Fidélité (1958–1963); France Musique (1963–1999); France Musiques (1999–2005)

Links
- Website: www.francemusique.fr

France Musique (French pronunciation: [fʁɑ̃s myzik]) is a French national public radio channel owned and operated by Radio France. It is devoted to the broadcasting of music, both live and recorded, with particular emphasis on classical music and jazz.

== History ==
The channel was launched by Radiodiffusion-Télévision Française (RTF) in 1954 as La Chaîne Haute-Fidélité, then renamed in 1958 as France IV Haute Fidélité, as RTF Haute Fidélité in 1963, and finally as France Musique later in the same year. It was known between 1999 and 2005 as France Musiques. The conductor André Jouve was coordinator of programming and music services at France Musique during the 1980s.

== Programming ==
The channel's schedules feature the transmission of many live and "as live" concerts (that is to say, those recorded live for broadcast at a later date), including the majority of the concerts given by the Orchestre National de France. Many of the concerts organized by France Musique are also broadcast in Canada by CBC Radio 2 as well as being relayed by other European classical music radio channels, such as BBC Radio 3 in the United Kingdom, and filmed for Arte television.

Live programmes begin at 7am each morning with Musique Matin.

Jazz is an important part of the output with two programmes each weekday evening: Au cœur du jazz and Banzzaï.

Weekend shows include a request show, France Musique est à vous, specialist programmes on guitars, cinema and musicals (42e Rue).

France Musique also has a number of genre-specific internet radio streams: 'Classique Easy' (popular classical pieces/movements), 'Opéra' (operas and excerpts), 'La Baroque' (Baroque and early music), 'Classique Plus' (a broad range of classical works), 'Concerts Radio France' (classical concerts recorded mostly in France), 'La Jazz' (jazz), 'La Contemporaine' (contemporary classical music), 'Ocora Musiques du monde' (world music), 'La B.O. Musiques de films' (music from film soundtracks). The day's programming is available via the web page of each stream. The recorded announcement between the pieces broadcast is often a stream-specific variation on '... Radio France sur francemusique.fr [... Radio France on francemusique.fr]'.
