= France Inter =

French public radio channel

- France

Programming
- Language: French
- Format: Generalist

Ownership
- Owner: Radio France
- Sister stations: France Info; ici; France Culture; France Musique; FIP; Mouv'

History
- First air date: 1 January 1947; 79 years ago
- Former names: Club d'Essai (1947); Paris-Inter (1947–1957); France I (1957–1963); RTF Inter (1963)

Links
- Website: franceinter.fr

France Inter (French pronunciation: [fʁɑ̃s ɛ̃tɛʁ]) is a French public radio channel and part of Radio France.

It is the successor to Paris Inter, later known as France I, and created as a merger of the France I and France II networks, first as RTF Inter in October 1963, then given its current name in December of that year. It is a "generalist" station, aiming to provide a wide national audience with a full service of news and spoken-word programming, both serious and entertaining, liberally punctuated with an eclectic mix of music. It is broadcast on FM and DAB+ from a nationwide network of transmitters, as well as via the internet.

It is the most popular station in France with over 7 million daily listeners.

== History ==
France Inter was founded as part of the reorganization of state broadcasting which followed the end of World War II as "Paris Inter" and charged with being French public radio's generalist (i.e. "full-service") service. The channel was renamed "France I" in 1958, although three years later one of France's most popular radio and television listings magazines was still showing the station's programmes under the heading "Paris-Inter" with "France I" as a subtitle. In October 1963 the France I and France II networks were merged to form "RTF Inter", renamed "France Inter" with effect from 8 December.

The major challenge faced by France Inter at the time of its reorganization in the 1960s was the success of private "peripheral stations" forbidden to air in France due to the state monopoly (in particular, RTL and Europe 1, broadcasting from powerful transmitters outside France) in capturing the majority of the French radio audience since the war. They had done so by adopting a modern broadcasting style and earning a reputation for greater freedom from government influence.

As well as rapidly modernizing its style to match its competitors, France Inter stressed its freedom from commercial pressures – although it does carry a limited amount of paid-for advertising – and especially presented itself as intelligent radio accessible to a general audience under the slogan Écoutez la différence ("Listen to the difference").

The channel announced during 2016 that it would discontinue transmissions from the Allouis longwave transmitter on 162 kHz with effect from 1 January 2017, thereby saving approximately €6 million per year. Transmission from Allouis of the atomic-clock-generated time signal (ALS162) would, however, continue after this date as the signal is critical for over 200,000 devices deployed within French enterprises and state entities, such as French Railways (SNCF), the electricity distributor ENEDIS, airports, hospitals, municipalities, etc. The final song France Inter played on long wave 162 kHz prior to being switched off on 31 December 2016 was "Last Night a D.J. Saved My Life" by Indeep.

== Slogans ==
- 1975: Écoutez la différence (Hear the difference)
- 1983: France Inter, pour ceux qui ont quelque chose entre les oreilles (France Inter, for those who have something between their ears)
- 1987: Plus haut la radio ! (Turn up the radio!)
- 1995: Écoutez, ça n'a rien à voir (Listen, that's beside the point [in French this is a play on "there's nothing to see"])
- 2001: Au début ça surprend. Après aussi (It's surprising at first — and after the fact)
- 2005: Qu’allez-vous découvrir aujourd’hui ? (What will you discover today?)
- 2008: France Inter, la différence (France Inter, the difference / the novelty)
- 2012: La voix est libre (The voice is free [in French this is a play on "the coast is clear"])
- 2013: 50 ans qu’on ouvre la voix (50 years of opening up the voice [in French this is a play on "paving the way"])
- 2014: InterVenez (Speak up / Take action)
- 2015: Vous êtes bien sur France Inter (You're really there on France Inter [in French this is a play on "You're doing fine"])
- 2023: France Inter 1ère radio de France (France Inter France's first radio)

== Funding ==
Inter-France is funded entirely by Radio France.

== Programmes ==
France Inter programmes, a number of which have been important milestones in the history of French radio, include:

- Le Masque et la Plume [fr] (The Mask And The Pen), arts reviews from journalist critics (on air since 13/11/1955)
- Le Jeu des 1000 euros (The 1000 Euros Game), a general-knowledge quiz programme (since 19/4/1958)
- La marche de l'histoire [fr] (The Course Of History), formerly Deux mille ans d'histoire, an in-depth daily documentary on a specific historical subject (1999-2020)
- Pop Club [fr] (The Pop Club) (1965–2005, i.e. 40 years with the same presenter José Artur)
- Le téléphone sonne (The Phone's Ringing), a current affairs discussion and phone-in programme (since 1978)
- Là-bas si j'y suis (Over there if I am there), a reports programme (1989–2014), The title is a play on words about the French idiom : "Va voir là-bas si j'y suis" (Leave me alone) and the facts that the journalists of this show go to see "over there" to report news and stories that doesn't usually appear in other radio and TV news magazines.
- La grande matinale (The big morning), formerly Inter Matin, morning news sequence (since 1982)
- Classique avec Dessay, formerly Carrefour De Lodéon, classical music programme (1992-2015)
- Les Cinglés du music-hall, prewar jazz and popular music presented by Jean-Christophe Averty for 28 years until 2006
- Le Grand Dimanche soir satirical evening show on politics and current affairs, produced by Charline Vanhoenacker, 2014 - 2024
- L'Oreille en coin, weekend show made up of multiple segments—including gags, stories, parodies, poetry, music, philosophical reflections, improvisations, and cleverly edited recordings—presented with a playful and intellectual tone. It acted as a kind of “radio within the radio”, combining humour, creativity, and variety (1968-1990).
