= France Info =

French news service

- Industry: News service
- Founded: 1 June 1987; 39 years ago (radio network); 1 September 2016; 10 years ago (transformation into global service)
- Headquarters: Paris, France
- Owner: France Télévisions; Radio France; France Médias Monde; Institut national de l'audiovisuel
- Website: www.franceinfo.fr
- Footnotes; ISSN 2609-3073

France Info (French pronunciation: [fʁɑ̃s ɛ̃fo]; stylised as franceinfo:) is a French public broadcasting service participated by France Télévisions, Radio France, France Médias Monde (FMM) and the Institut national de l'audiovisuel.

The service includes a radio network, a TV channel, a website, and a mobile application.

== Background ==
Launched on 1 June 1987 by Radio France, France Info is Europe's first radio network, that broadcasts live news and information 24 hours a day, serving most regions in France in 105.5 MHz. On 11 July 2016, the name of France Télévisions' then-upcoming news channel was announced to be France Info, which was launched on 1 September that year. This gathered the radio, television and online services under the banner of France Info.

== Online ==
On 24 August 2016, France Télévisions' France TV Info online service and Radio France's France Info website were merged into a new look service. It serves as the official website of both France Info radio and television channels, as well as Radio France and France Télévisions' news offerings.

== Organisation ==
=== Digital ===
- Since August 2016: Célia Meriguet

=== Radio ===
- August 2016 – June 2017: Laurent Guimier
- July 2017 – December 2020: Vincent Giret
- Since January 2021: Jean-Philippe Baille
- Since September 2024: Agnès Vahramian

=== Television ===
- August 2016 – September 2020: Stéphane Dubun
- October 2020 – September 2022: Sophie Guillin
- Since September 2022: Erik Berg
- Since 2 September 2024: Laurent Delpech

== Sound Design ==
Jean-Michel Jarre is the creator of the sound design put in place in 2016.
