= Generalist channel =

Television channel whose programming is aimed at a general audience

A generalist channel is a television or radio channel whose target audience is not confined to a particular set of people, but instead aims to offer a wide range of programs and program genres to a diverse general public. The term is mainly used in European countries; in other countries, the term general entertainment channel (also known as GEC in India) or general entertainment is used instead. In radio, this is sometimes referred to as "full-format programming" or full-service radio.

== Program content ==
Generalist TV channels focus on general entertainment. They also tend to put an extra emphasis on news programming, regarding the provision of news and information as part of their duty.

== Popularity ==
Generalist channels as a whole are the most watched of all television channels.

As of 2008, generalist channels were the most numerous among channel genres in Europe. There were 376 of them, followed by 324 sports channels, 269 entertainment channels and 238 music channels.

Among HD television channels in Europe, as of 2011 and 2012, generalist channels were third most numerous, with the ones specializing in sport and movies coming out 1st and 2nd respectively.

A book published in 2010 cited a study saying that generalist television channels comprised 41 percent of global television market value and accounted for 70 percent of global television market volume.

With the growth in popularity of television, generalist channels such as full service radio greatly declined in radio, and are now mostly limited to public broadcasting stations. Generalist and full-service multichannel television channels have been the most heavily damaged by cord-cutting and the shift to streaming television; in the United States, generalist channels such as TNT, TBS and USA have seen their viewership decline far more rapidly than the industry average, which itself has seen a sharp decline in subscriptions and viewership.

== See also ==
- Blockbuster (entertainment)
- Broadcast television network
- Ethnic media
