= Radio France =

French public service radio broadcaster

- Type: Société anonyme
- Industry: Public broadcasting
- Founded: 1 January 1975; 51 years ago
- Headquarters: Maison de la Radio et de la Musique, Paris, France
- Area served: France
- Key people: Sibyle Veil (CEO)
- Products: Radio broadcasting, radio production
- Services: Public radio
- Revenue: 671 millions € (2018)
- Net income: 7,3 millions € (2018)
- Owner: Government of France
- Number of employees: 4 562 (2018)
- Subsidiaries: France Inter; France Bleu; France Culture; France Musique; France Info; FIP; Mouv'; Sophia; Arte (15%); Radio France Publicité
- Website: www.radiofrance.fr

Radio France (French pronunciation: [ʁadjo fʁɑ̃s]) is the French national public radio broadcaster.

== Mission ==
The two principal missions of Radio France are to create and develop programming across all of its stations, and to oversee the development and management of its musical ensembles. These consist of the Orchestre National de France (National Orchestra of France), the Orchestre Philharmonique de Radio France (Radio France Philharmonic Orchestra), the Chœur de Radio France (Choir of Radio France), and the Maîtrise de Radio France, a choir school that includes a choir of children and teenagers.

== History ==
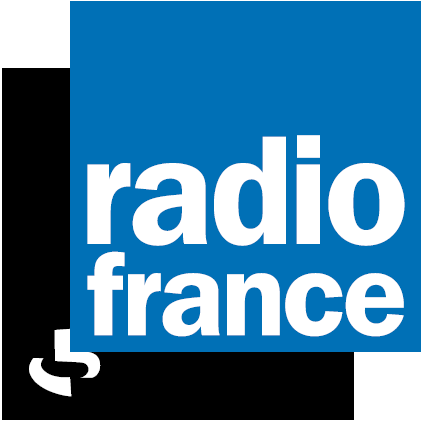
The Radio France logo from 2005 to 2017

Radio broadcasting in France began to develop at the end of the 19th century. In 1897, a year after the experiments of Marconi, Eugène Ducretet began trials of radio transmission using a mast installed on the third level of the Eiffel Tower. By 1921, regular information broadcasts were taking place from a studio in the tower, including weather forecasts and stock market prices.

On 6 November 1922, eight days before the creation of the BBC, Radiola began regular broadcasts as the first private French radio transmitter. In 1924 it was renamed Radio Paris. Other stations soon followed, including Radio Toulouse and Radio Lyon, and later Radio Luxembourg in 1932 and 1933. By the outbreak of World War II, France had 14 commercial and 12 public radio stations.

Between 1940 and 1944, radio broadcasting in both the German-occupied zone and the southern territory governed by the Vichy regime was taken over by the state. During 1942 and 1943, with the agreement of the Vichy authorities, Radio Monte Carlo and its financial holding company, SOFIRAD, were established. Following the Liberation of France in 1944, the state maintained a broadcasting monopoly for practical and ideological reasons. Public service radio was provided by the RDF, which soon became the RTF, and later the ORTF in 1964.

In 1955, the commercial station Europe No. 1 began broadcasting from the Saarland region of Germany, which had been released from French occupation that year. A decade later, in 1965, the French radio services were reorganised under the direction of Roland Dhordain. France I and France II were merged to form RTF Inter, later renamed France Inter. France III became RTF Promotion, later France Culture, while France IV was renamed RTF Haute Fidélité and later France Musique.

A major restructuring occurred in 1975 when the ORTF was dissolved. Its activities were divided among several new organisations, including television channels (TF1 (Télévision française 1), Antenne 2 and France Région 3), the technical transmission operator (TDF — Télédiffusion de France), archive and training services (INA — Institut National de l'Audiovisuel), and production services (SFP — Société Française de Production). At that point, Radio France became an independent public service radio broadcaster under state control.

In 1981, after pressure from independent and pirate broadcasters as well as commercial radio interests, the newly elected president François Mitterrand authorised the licensing of "free radio" stations. These became known as radios locales privées. Initially supported by state subsidies, they were later funded through commercial advertising from 1984, and by 1986 many had formed national networks. This marked the re-emergence of a private radio sector broadcasting from within France.

By 1999, radio listening remained widespread in the country. The daily radio audience reach was 83%, with listeners spending on average more than three hours per day listening. Radio sets were present in 99% of French homes, 80% of households had a car radio, and 26.8% owned a personal stereo.

In 2000, Radio France reorganised its network of stations. France Bleu became a purely regional network mainly broadcasting on FM, while the national AM frequencies were reassigned to France Info. Several FIP stations in major cities were closed and replaced by the youth-oriented station Le Mouv'.

In 2015, Radio France announced that it would end its Medium Wave (AM) broadcasts on 31 December of that year.

== Stations ==
Radio France offers seven national networks:

- France Inter — Radio France's "generalist" station, featuring entertaining and informative talk mixed with a wide variety of music, plus hourly news bulletins with extended news coverage in the morning, midday, and early-evening peaks
- France Info — 24-hour news
- France Culture — cultural programming covering the arts, history, science, philosophy, etc. together with in-depth news coverage at peak times
- France Musique — classical music and jazz
- Ici — a network of 44 regional stations, mixing popular music with locally based talk and information, including:
  - Ici Paris Île-de-France — for the Paris-Île-de-France region
  - Ici Béarn Bigorre — Pyrénées-Atlantiques
  - Ici Nord — Nord and Pas de Calais
- FIP — specialising in a wide range of music – classical, hip hop, jazz, chanson, rock, blues, world music – and minimal speech
- Mouv' — urban music, aimed at a young audience

== Organization ==
=== General ===
In September 2019, a bill emanating from the Ministry of Culture announces the creation of "France Médias", a parent company which will bring together France Télévisions, Radio France, France Médias Monde and the INA. This bill also provides for the end of the appointments of directors of Radio France by the CSA, a power which will be attributed to the board of directors of the radiophonic entity, which will continue to operate independently, but also in synergy with the other entities of France Médias.

=== Presidents and CEOs ===
Mathieu Gallet, former president and CEO of the Institut national de l'audiovisuel (National Audiovisual Institute (INA)) from 2010 to 2014, was unanimously appointed by the members of the Higher Audiovisual Council (CSA)

Thus, he was revoked by the CSA and Sibyle Veil took over.

=== Communication ===
Beyond its primary profession which is to make radio, Radio France works on many political, social or cultural projects. The group deploys resources to support various causes, is committed on several fronts, and makes it known through communication actions. Thus, in 2018 Radio France indicates that:

- The new 2018-2020 company agreement "supports Radio France's proactive policy in favor of equal opportunities";
- A new three-year company agreement to promote professional and salary equality between men and women was signed on 1 July 2018.
- Since 2016, "project partnerships" have been carried out for the cultural development of French-speaking countries (Benin, Haiti, Gabon).
- The audiovisual group and the France-China Committee join forces to promote economic and cultural exchanges between France and China around music
- He signs the creation of an artistic exchange program based on a circle of patrons in China
- It supports the European Week for the Employment of People with Disabilities, by providing activities at the Maison de la Radio

=== Headquarters ===
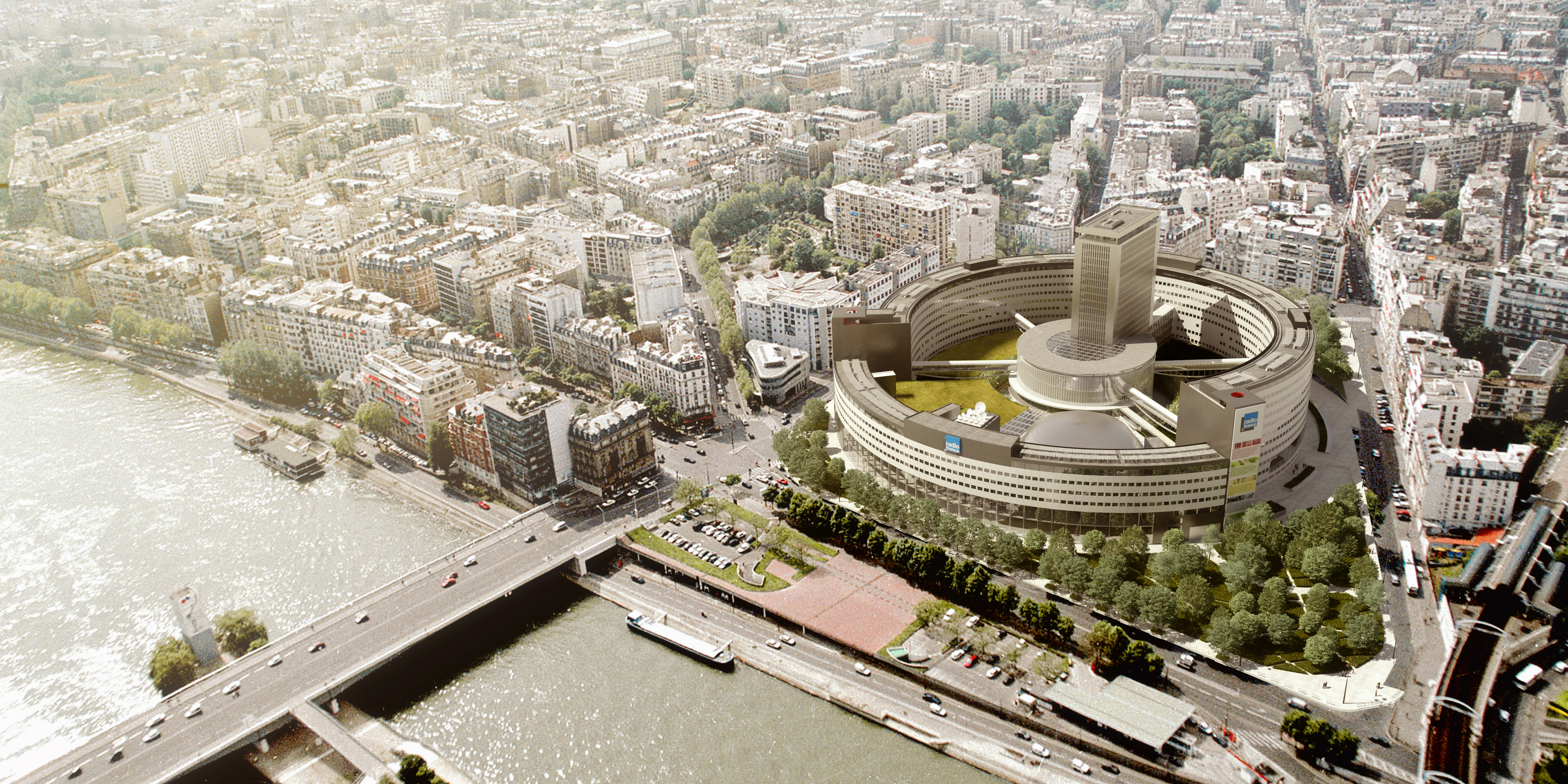
Maison de la Radio seen from the air in 2009

Radio France has its headquarters at the Maison de la Radio et de la Musique, a circular building designed by the architect Henry Bernard (architect) and inaugurated in December 1963 by President Charles de Gaulle, which stands beside the River Seine in the 16th arrondissement of Paris. In addition to housing Radio France's central services and the studios of several of its channels, the building is home to the Musée de Radio France, a museum of radio and television broadcasting and recording techniques. The building caught fire in October 2014.

=== Ethics committee ===
In application of the law of 14 November 2016 and its implementing decree of 21 March 2017, an ethics committee is created to strengthen freedom, the independence and pluralism of the media. […] This committee is made up of five independent individuals appointed for three years, and whose mandate is renewable.

=== Equipment ===
The headquarters of Radio France is constituted of roughly a hundred studios dedicated to radio broadcasts and concerts, as well as an auditorium, which stands on the site of the former studios 102 and 103. Public broadcasts and concerts are generally held in studio 105 (with 237 seats) and studio 106 (with 137 seats). Studios 611, 621, 511, and 521 are dedicated to the France Inter channel. Studio 221 is described as the "telegenic" studio, where programs such as "Les Informés", "8.30 Franceinfo", or "Questions Politiques" are recorded and aired on the television channel France Info.

=== Budget ===
The Radio France group is 100% owned by the French State. Nearly 80% of Radio France's funding comes from Television licence, the remaining 20% comes from own resources, mainly from advertising and diversification activities developed by Radio France.

When Television licence was repealed in 2022, it was decided that it would be financed through a portion of VAT (4 B€ per year for both France Télévisions and Radio France).

== Group activities ==
=== Information and investigation ===
The investigation unit of Radio France, the usual name of the investigation and investigation department of Radio France, is divided into three poles: production, digital, and investigation. This last pole includes five investigators.

The investigation unit has been a partner of Disclose since 2018.

=== Regular and event-based partnerships ===
When the news so requires, Radio France stations resort to event programming, which is no longer subject to the program schedules. These events, whether political, economic, societal, cultural or sporting, can be found in the pages retracing the annual chronologies of the radio media.

== Broadcasting ==
=== Analogue broadcasting ===
Since 1975, Radio France has been broadcasting in FM on almost the entire territory.

Radio France broadcast between 1975 and 2016 in AM: France Inter GO (1939–2016); France Inter PO (1956–1996); France Inter OC (1975–1981), France Culture PO (1975–1980); Radio Bleu PO (1980–2000); France Info PO (2000–2016).

In 2016, Radio France's programs were broadcast in RNT (DAB +) over the Paris region via an experiment. In 2019, the CSA allocates to all the national frequencies of Radio France, via a call for tenders procedure, broadcast in DAB +. This technology mainly aims to allow better sound quality, the addition of data synchronized or not with the radio (scrolling texts, images, information, websites, etc.) and a lower broadcasting cost than that of FM.

=== Digital broadcasting ===
Since 2006, Radio France has produced its programs entirely in digital and since 2012 has offered numerous programs in podcast in MP3 format. From 2014, faced with the boom in the consumption of videos on the Internet, and the development of the use of tablets or smartphones, Radio France introduced the concept of "enriched radio" which consists of filming the studio during the recording some radio broadcasts. The video is then put online live (in streaming ) on the station's website or inserted into a video catalog so that it can be viewed after the broadcast on air.

== See also ==
- Radio France Internationale
- Public Francophone Radios

== Sources ==
- Information from Geoff Hare, Newcastle University
