= List of radio stations in France =

The following is a list of radio stations in France.

== Radio France ==
The publicly run Radio France consortium controls around 40 radio stations, 31 of which fall under the France Bleu group.

- FIP
- France Culture
- France Info
- France Inter
- France Musique
- ici (44 regional stations)
- Mouv'

== Public radio independent of Radio France ==
- RFI (Radio France Internationale) (controlled by France Medias Monde)
- RFO (Réseau France Outre-mer) (controlled by France Télévisions)

== Independent National Radio (by network) ==
=== Espace Group ===
- Alpes 1 (Annecy, Gap)
- Jazz Radio (Lyon)
- Générations (Paris)
- Là la Radio (Briançon)
- La Radio Plus (Thonon-les-Bains)
- MFM Radio (Paris)
- ODS Radio (Annecy)
- Radio Espace (Lyon)
- RVA (Clermont-Ferrand)
- Virage Radio (ex Couleur 3) (Lyon)

=== Groupe Les Échos ===
- Radio Classique (Paris)

=== ISA Media Development ===
- N'Radio
- Radio ISA
- Radio No1

=== Lagardère News ===
- Europe 1
- Europe 2
- RFM

=== Nova Press ===
- Radio Nova
- TSF Jazz

=== NRJ Group ===
- Chérie FM
- Nostalgie
- NRJ
- Rire & Chansons

=== Groupe Orbus ===
- Skyrock

=== RMC BFM ===
- BFM Business
- BFM Radio
- RMC

=== Groupe M6 ===
- Fun Radio
- RTL
- RTL 2

=== Groupe 1981 ===
- Ado FM
- Black Box
- Forum
- Latina
- Ouï FM
- Vibration
- Voltage
- Wit FM

=== Other private radio stations ===
- Beur FM
- Contact
- Mona FM
- Phare FM
- Radio FG
- RCF (Radios chrétiennes francophones)
- Radio Courtoisie
- ExplosHits Radio
- In addition there are five independent stations that broadcast along the length of the major French motorways, principally providing 24-hour traffic information.
  - Autoroute Info
  - Radio Atlandes Autoroute
  - Sanef 107.7
  - Radio Vinci Autoroutes
  - Autoroute de Gascogne FM

== Independent Local Radio (by region) ==
=== Paris and Ile-de-France ===
- Aligre FM
- Francestar FM
- Fréquence Paris Plurielle
- Fréquence IDO
- Fréquence protestante
- Ici et Maintenant
- Mamgembo
- Music Box
- Music Capucins
- Radio Alfa – for the Portuguese community
- Radio campus Paris
- Radio Enghien
- Radio Libertaire
- Radio Orient
- Radio pays
- Sport FM
- Vallée FM

=== Others ===
- 100% Radio
- 47 FM
- Accent 4
- Activ Radio
- Aligre FM
- Alouette FM
- Aquitaine Radio Live
- Beur FM
- Canal FM
- Champagne FM
- Collines FM
- Delta FM
- D!rect FM
- Divergence FM
- Durance FM
- Echo FM
- ECN
- Émotion FM
- Est FM
- FC Radio
- Flash FM
- Flor FM
- FMC Radio
- France Maghreb 2
- Fréquence Grands Lacs
- Fréquence Horizon
- Fréquence Paris Plurielle 1992 Gianni Carrozza rédacteur en chef FPP Fréquence Paris Plurielle
- Fréquence Plus
- Fusion FM
- Gold FM
- Grand Sud FM
- Happy FM
- Hit West
- Hot Radio
- Impact FM
- Inside Radio
- Intensité
- Jordanne FM
- K6FM
- Kiss FM (Nice)
- Latina
- Littoral FM
- Logos FM
- Lor'FM
- Lyon 1ère
- Magnum la radio
- Maritima Radio
- Mistral FM
- Mixx Radio
- Mona FM
- Montagne FM
- NOV Fm
- MTI
- Océane FM
- Or'FM
- Plein Air
- Radio Bonheur
- Radio 6
- Radio 8
- Radio Alfa – for the Portuguese community
- Radio Azur
- Radio Bonheur
- Radio Caroline
- Radio Cigogne
- Radio Côte d'amour
- Radio Cristal
- Radio Dreyeckland
- Radio ECN
- Radio FG
- Radio Fréquence Nîmes
- Radio Fugi
- Radio Galaxie
- Radio Galere
- Radio Grenouille
- Radio Jérico
- Radio Latitude
- Radio Liberté
- Radio Mélodie
- Radio Ménergy
- Radio Metropolys
- Radio Mont Blanc
- Radio Orient
- Radio Oxygène
- Radio Rezo
- Radio Scoop
- Radio Star
- Radio Studio 1
- Radio VFM
- Radio Vitamine
- RadiOcéan
- Radio RCN
- RDL Radio
- Résonance
- RBA
- RMB
- RMN FM
- RTS FM
- RV1
- RVM
- Sea FM
- Sun 101.5
- Sweet FM
- Tempo La Radio
- Tendance Ouest
- TFM
- Tonic Radio
- Top Music
- Totem
- Toulouse FM
- Tropiques FM
- Urban Hit
- Variation

== Category A Stations ==
Non-Commercial Stations

- Judaïques FM, Radio J, Radio Shalom, RCJ (Radio de la Communauté Juive) – Paris (time sharing on 94.8 FM); Religious
- Radio Courtoisie – political
- Radio Notre-Dame – Paris; religious

== Internet ==
- Francestar FM, France's Hit Music Station...!! FRANCESTAR MEDIA!
- France Vivace, from the Radio France group
- Frequence 3, a Web Radio from Paris
- Plasm, a web radio from an independent group
- Berceuses, a web radio broadcasting lullabies. It is also available to download on the App Store.

== Stations that are no longer broadcasting ==
- Brioude FM (?-1988)
- Chic FM (1986–1987)
- Hit FM
- KWFM (1989–1990)
- Radio Blagon, an internet radio station promoting francophone groups from the alternative music scene (off air since 9 January 2013)
