= Les Indés Radios =

Group of French local radio stations

- Type: GIE
- Founded: November 1992; 34 years ago
- Founder: Jean-Éric Valli
- Headquarters: France
- Number of locations: 1
- Area served: France
- Key people: Jean-Éric Valli
- Website: lesindesradio.fr

Les Indés Radio is a groupement d'intérêt économique (Economic Interest Grouping) created in 1992, and currently composed of 125 local radio stations in France.

== History ==
In November 1992, the GIE Les Indépendants (The Independents) was created, following the initiative taken by Jean-Éric Valli (owner of the Sud Radio Groupe).

In November 2010, the group was renamed Les Indés Radio

== List of radio stations ==
=== Owned ===
These radio stations are members of Les Indés Radios, but owned by a group:

- Arthur World Participation Group
  - OÜI FM - AWPG
  - Nice Radio
- Espace Group
  - Alpes 1
  - Générations
  - Jazz Radio (broadcasts since 1996; 2008 renamed from Fréquence Jazz)
  - Là la Radio
  - La Radio Plus
  - ODS Radio
  - Radio Espace
  - Radio RVA
  - Virage Radio
- Groupe La Voix
  - Champagne FM
  - Contact
- HPI Groupe
  - Chante France
  - Évasion FM (HPI Groupe)
- ISA Media Development
  - Radio Isa
  - Radio No1
- Sofirad (Société financière de radiodiffusion)
  - Africa Radio
- Sud Radio Groupe
  - Ado FM
  - Black Box
  - Forum
  - Sud Radio
  - Vibration
  - Voltage
  - Wit FM

=== Fully independent ===
These stations are independent, and member of Les Indés Radios:

A-F

- 100% Radio
- 47 FM
- Activ Radio
- Aligre FM
- Alouette FM
- Aquitaine Radio Live
- Beur FM
- Canal FM
- Collines FM
- Delta FM
- D!rect FM
- Durance FM
- Echo FM
- Émotion FM
- Est FM
- FC Radio
- Flash FM
- Flor FM
- FMC Radio
- France Maghreb 2
- Fréquence Grands Lacs
- Fréquence Horizon
- Fréquence Plus
- Fusion FM

G-P

- Gold FM
- Grand Sud FM
- Happy FM
- Hit West
- Hot Radio
- Impact FM
- Inside Radio
- Intensité
- Jordanne FM
- K6FM
- Kiss FM (Nice)
- Latina
- Littoral FM
- Lor'FM
- Lyon 1ère
- Magnum la radio
- Maritima Radio
- Mistral FM
- Mixx Radio
- Mona FM
- Montagne FM
- MTI
- Océane FM
- Or'FM
- Plein Air

R

- Radio Bonheur
- Radio 6
- Radio 8
- Radio Alfa
- Radio Azur
- Radio Bonheur
- Radio Caroline
- Radio Côte d'amour
- Radio Cristal
- Radio Dreyeckland
- Radio ECN
- Radio FG
- Radio Galaxie
- Radio Jérico
- Radio Latitude
- Radio Liberté
- Radio Mélodie
- Radio Ménergy
- Radio Metropolys
- Radio Mont Blanc
- Radio Orient
- Radio Oxygène
- Radio Rezo
- Radio Scoop

R-V

- Radio Star
- Radio Studio 1
- Radio VFM
- Radio Vitamine
- RadiOcéan
- Radio RCN
- RDL Radio
- Résonance
- RMB
- RMN FM
- RTS FM
- RV1
- RVM
- Sea FM
- Sun 101.5
- Sweet FM
- Tempo La Radio
- Tendance Ouest
- TFM
- Tonic Radio
- Top Music
- Totem
- Toulouse FM
- Tropiques FM
- Urban Hit
- Variation
