= Espace =

Espace may refer to:

== Media ==
- Espace musique, a Canadian radio service
- RTS Espace 2, a Swiss French-language radio station
- Radio Espace, a French radio station

== Other uses ==
- ESPACE, a complexity class in computational complexity theory
- Espace Group, a French media company
- Group Espace, a concrete art group
- Renault Espace, a multi-purpose-vehicle
- eSpace, an Egyptian software company
