= Skyrock =

Skyrock may refer to:

- Skyrock (social network site), a French social network site
- Skyrock (radio), a French radio station
