= Le Fooding =

Brand of a restaurant guide and gastronomic events

Le Fooding is a restaurant and food events guide started in 2000 by journalists and food critics Emmanuel Rubin and Alexandre Cammas. Its name is a portmanteau of the words "food" and "feeling." Le Fooding exists as an annual restaurant guide available in print, online, and as a smartphone app.

The goal of Le Fooding, as described by Frédéric Mitterrand, is to make gastronomy less intimidating for people who just want to cook and eat in a relaxed way. The name was first used in 1999 by French journalist and food critic Alexandre Cammas, one of Fooding's founders, in an article for Nova magazine. The brand is also associated with charitable international culinary events.

== Concept and creation ==
In 2010, Adam Gopnik wrote in a New Yorker piece that Le Fooding is "to cooking what the French New Wave was to French cinema."

Le Fooding aims to open a "freer channel in the gastronomic universe", and emphasizes "the appetite for novelty and quality, rejection of boredom, love of fun, the ordinary, the sincere, and a yearning to eat with the times".

Initially established by Alexandre Cammas along with fellow journalist and food critic Emmanuel Rubin, Fooding was supported by Jean-François Bizot and Bruno Delport, the director of Nova Press. Since 2004, it has been supported by Marine Bidaud, an associate director of Le Fooding.

== Guide ==
As an independent food guide, Le Fooding receives money from sponsors to pay its reviewers. They show this by posting pictures of bills for their meals on their website. Fooding does not let the restaurants it reviews buy advertising space, stating that it does this to stay financially independent. According to Cammas, these steps are important in order to maintain freedom of expression and taste.

In 2012, Cammas published an article in Le Monde where he talked about these rules and supported the ethical standards of the Michelin Guide. "These are the essential conditions," says Cammas, "for preserving freedom of expression and taste."

Though otherwise written entirely in French, the Tips in English section allow English speakers to follow the guide as well. The 2013 Le Fooding Guide included a section on favorite restaurants worldwide. The Le Fooding Guide was also published in later years, though the company website is more popular than the hardcover guides.

== Printed guide ==
The first editions of the Le Fooding guide (2000–2004) were released as special editions of Nova magazine, titled Guide Fooding: 1000 adresses pour saliver Paris (The Fooding Guide: 1000 restaurants to drool over in Paris). In 2003 and 2004, two Fooding & Style special issues were published as a supplement to Nova magazine.

In 2004, Nova Magazine stopped publication and, as a result, its special editions. In November 2005, the Paris Fooding Guide relaunched as a supplement to Libération, under the direction of Louis Dreyfus. In December 2005, the website launched with the online edition of the Paris Guide. The France Fooding Guide was published for the first time in 2006, again in partnership with Libération, and the guide's website, lefooding.com, became a national guide.

In 2006 and 2007, the Fooding Guide followed Louis Dreyfus to the Nouvel Observateur, where he took up the post of general director. The 2008 France Guide then became a special edition of the Novel Observateur, with the subtitle 370 restaurants bien de chez nous – Guide vacances été 2007 (370 of our restaurants – Summer vacation guide 2007). A second release of the 2008 Paris Guide came out in September 2007 with the subtitle 400 restaurants pour embrasser le goût de l’époque (400 restaurants that embrace the taste of the times).

In 2008, a few months after the death of Jean-François Bizot, the Le Fooding office moved in with the office of Les Inrockuptibles at the invitation of Frédéric Allary. In November 2008, for the first time in its history, the France Fooding Guide was published autonomously, under the direction of Alexandre Cammas and Marine Bidaud.

== App ==
Launched at the end of October 2010, Le Fooding's iPhone app was available for free until 31 December 2010. Within its initial launch period of two months, the application was downloaded 80,000 times. Since 1 January 2011, the France Guide iPhone app has been available as a paid application (€3.59). In January 2013, the app was ranked 19th in top paid apps and 1st in the Food and Drink category. In August 2012, Le Fooding Guide for Android was released on Google Play (€3.59). In 2014, the app was made available in English and as a "premium" version, which also includes the hotel guide. Starting January 2017, the app was made available for free and is updated regularly on both iPhone and Android platforms.

== Writers ==
Along with Alexandre Cammas and editor-in-chief Yves Nespoulous, various authors, journalists, food writers, writers, and bloggers people regularly contribute to different editions of the guide. Among these contributors include Julie Andrieu, Sébastien Demorand, Trish Deseine, Frédérick Ernestine Grasser-Hermé, Dominique Hutin, Emmanuel Rubin, and Andrea Petrini.

François-Régis Gaudry, a journalist at L’Express, France Inter, and Paris Première, has stated that he bylined his first gastronomy article for Le Fooding Guide in 2001. Many other collaborators made their debut as professional food lovers with Le Fooding: Marie Aline, Kéda Black, Danièle Gerkens, Jérome Lefort, Francois Lemarie, Elvira Masson, Julia Sammut, Victoire Loup and Hugo de St Phalle.

== Controversies ==
Some foreign observers believe that Le Fooding contributes to the reinvention of the French culinary and event scene on an international scale. Jean-Luc Petitrenaud wrote in VSD that Le Fooding is "a ridiculous trend for a few Parisian journalists looking for fame." A debate between the journalist Paul Wermus and Alexandre Cammas during Paul Amar's TV program, Revu et Corrigé, has been featured in TV blooper shows.

On 15 November 2010, during the 10th anniversary celebration of Le Fooding, then-current French Culture Minister Frédéric Mitterrand presented the Le Fooding Award to a Breton chef. A couple of days later, journalists Colette Monsat and François Simon questioned his support in the 19 November 2010 issue of Madame Figaro. The Minister responded, "You can love Rembrandt and Basquiat. By appreciating Basquiat, one comes to have a taste for Rembrandt, and vice versa."

Unlike the Michelin star system, Le Fooding emphasizes younger chefs and a broader range of cuisines and prices. Michelin bought a large stake in Le Fooding in 2018.

== See also ==
- Cook (profession)
- Restaurant
- Hospitality industry
- Culinary arts
- Celebrity chef
- Gastronomy
