= TSF Jazz =

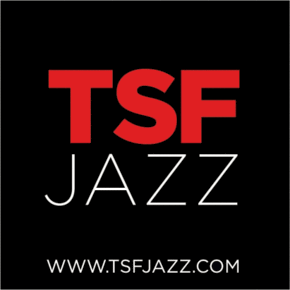
- Paris; France
- Broadcast area: France
- Frequencies: 89.9 MHz (Paris); 98.1 MHz (Nice); 98.1 MHz (Cannes); 11 frequencies (2013)

Programming
- Language: French
- Format: Jazz

Ownership
- Owner: Nova Press; (TowerCast)
- Sister stations: Radio Nova

History
- First air date: August 1, 1999
- Former call signs: TSF-93 (1981–1990); TSF (1991–1999); TSF Jazz (1999); TSF 89,9 (1999–2008)

Technical information
- Transmitter coordinates: 48.8567°N 2.3508°E

Links
- Webcast: Listen Live
- Website: tsfjazz.com

TSF Jazz, previously known as TSF 89.9, is a jazz radio station in Paris, France, that was started in 1999 and owned by Nova Press. The station broadcasts in the Île-de-France: in Paris on 89.9 FM where it can almost be heard in the whole region, and the French Riviera, with frequencies in Nice and Cannes. TSF, the acronym of the station, stands for Télégraphie Sans Fil and means "Wireless Telegraphy", an archaic French term for "radio".

== History ==
=== Communist TSF ===
In 1981, TSF Jazz was originally created in Seine-Saint-Denis as a talk, sports, music and local info station, then as "TSF-93" established by elected Socialist Party members and the French Communist Party, and transmitted from Romainville.

In 1990, the radio station merged with the communist radio stations of every department in Île-de-France including TSF Paris: Radio Top Essonne, 92 Radio, Radio Soleil 94 and TSF Colline 95, to rename all those stations to simply "TSF".

Beginning in 1993, TSF brought together several local radio stations in France: Forum 91,3 in Bordeaux, Agora FM in Grasse, Loire FM in Saint-Étienne and four other local stations known as "TSF" in Cognac, Lyon, Nérac, and Nice in addition to TSF Paris. TSF then changed its Parisian frequency from 93.0 FM to 89.9. TSF Jazz in Paris is still broadcasting on this frequency.

In 1995, four new stations began to retransmit some of its programs (news and programs) on Radio Calaisis from Calais, Actuel from Le Havre, Chalette from Montargis and Radio Quinquin from Saint-Omer.

In 1996, TSF was at its peak with three new stations: TSF Jordanne (Cantal department), TSF Isère (Grenoble) TSF Aravis (Ugine). The TSF radio network then broadcast on 19 frequencies in France.

The station stopped broadcasting in the local radio stations of Bordeaux, Lyon, Nérac, Nice, le Havre, Saint-Omer and Grenoble. The other stations Agora, Loire FM, Calaisis, Radio Chalette and Radio Jordanne then become completely independent again, while keeping the spirit of TSF.

In 1998, TSF Cognac and TSF Aravis stopped broadcasting as well.

In 1999, after the decline of the Parisian radio station, a redemption by Fréquence Jazz was mentioned, but finally TSF attempted to stay broadcasting by changing its format completely by adopting a jazz format under the name of "TSF Jazz". The owners of TSF eventually failed after this attempt.

=== Redemption by Nova Press ===
In August 1999, the group Nova Press rescued the radio station after the failure of the communist TSF station, to then become part of the Nova Press group in its offices of Faubourg, Paris. Jean-François Bizot and Frank Ténot bought the old TSF station, then renamed it by referencing its Parisian frequency, TSF 89.9, and made it "The Jazz & Info" radio station of Paris and the Ile-de-France. Hosts of the TSF station did not hesitate to cross the door that separated the two stations of TSF 89.9 and Radio Nova, to host some programs of Radio Nova, which also played jazz along with various other genres.

=== TSF Jazz ===
In September 2008 the station announced to change its name again to "TSF Jazz" (without reference to the Parisian 89.9 frequency) and adopted a much more simple logo along with a new slogan, with the main objective to cover France nationally.

On 4 December 2008, TSF Jazz started broadcasting on its seventh frequency in Laval; around 100,000 people in the area could receive the station.

On 26 May 2009, the CSA selected the radio station to broadcast digitally in Marseille, Nice and Paris. TSF Jazz also celebrated its 10-year anniversary.

In 2011, TSF Jazz along with Radio Nova left the group of Les Indés Radios, of which the stations were members.

== Broadcasting area ==
TSF Jazz broadcasts throughout France on FM on the following frequencies:

- Amiens: 99,8
- Bourg-en-Bresse: 98,5
- Cannes: 98,1
- Chambéry: 91,4
- Laval: 97,7
- Nevers: 90,2
- Nice: 98,1
- Orléans: 106,7
- Paris - Île-de-France: 89,9
- Poitiers: 96,6
- Rouen: 89,8
- Valence: 89,5

TSF Jazz is also available on the Internet and via satellite.
