= Daniel Richard =

French entrepreneur (1944–2023)

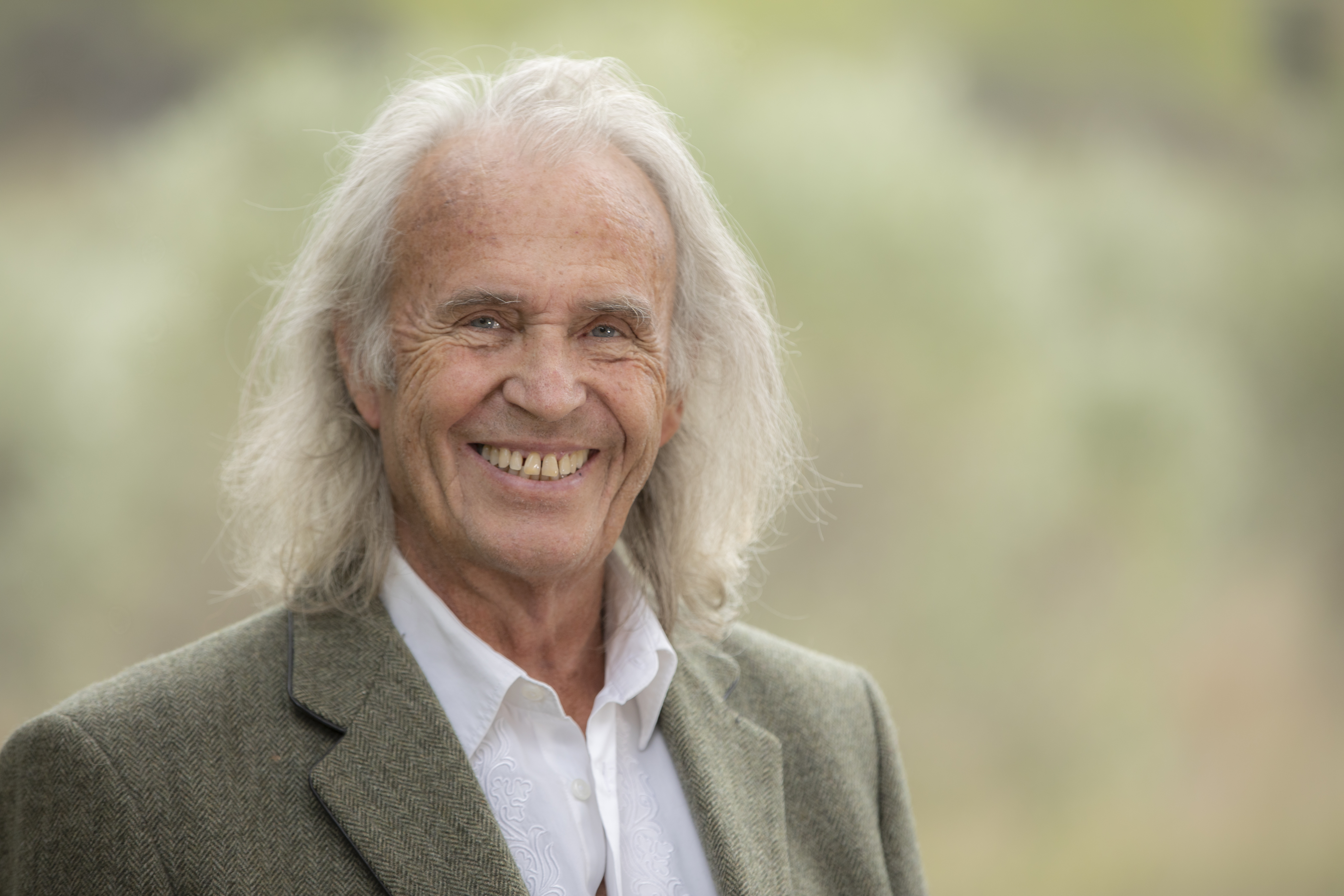
- Richard in 2019
- Born: 19 April 1944; Bagnols-sur-Cèze, France
- Died: 12 January 2023 (aged 78); Montpellier, France
- Education: École nationale de l'aviation civile
- Occupation: Entrepreneur

Daniel Richard (19 April 1944 – 12 January 2023) was a French entrepreneur.

== Biography ==
Born in Bagnols-sur-Cèze on 19 April 1944, Richard's mother died when he was three years old. The grandson of a polytechnician, he attended the École nationale de l'aviation civile from 1964 to 1966 and earned a degree in engineering.

At the age of 25, Richard began working for the firm Bossard Consultant. He was later hired by 3 Suisses, which he led ten years later. In 1997, LVMH appointed him manager of Sephora, succeeding Dominique Mandonnaud. In 2001, he became director of development and innovation of the Groupe Galeries Lafayette. He was elected CEO of Nova Press in 2007, replacing Jean-François Bizot, who had died.

In 2009, Richard took over the clothing brand Souleiado with his son, Stéphane. In 2018, the two had a dispute and Stéphane sued his father. Daniel Richard was dismissed in 2020 in a decision made by a commercial court in Tarascon and confirmed by the Court of Appeal of Aix-en-Provence, which stated that he had displayed "behavior unsuitable for a manager". He felt "betrayed" by his son and appealed to the Court of Cassation.

=== Philanthropy ===
In 2001, Richard succeeded Luc Hoffmann as president of the World Wide Fund for Nature - France. He was succeeded by Claude Dumont in 2008. During his mandate, the L'Alliance pour la planète brought together more than 80 NGOs for the Grenelle Environnement in 2005. That same year, he launched a blood analysis campaign with volunteers in Nîmes, though no results were published.

=== Politics ===
In February 2009, Richard founded the environmental and citizens movement, Résistances, with Victor Hugo Espinoza. That year, he announced his candidacy for the European election in Île-de-France. In 2020, he announced his candidacy for the municipal council of Nîmes with support from Europe Ecology – The Greens and the Socialist Party, the Radical Party of the Left, La France Insoumise, Ecology Generation, and Cap21. He joined Yvan Lachaud of The Centrists in the party list, a move unpopular with voters, leading him to finish with only 18.62% of votes in the second round.

=== Death ===
Daniel Richard died in Montpellier on 12 January 2023, at the age of 78.

== Honors ==
- Knight of the Legion of Honour (1997)
