= Radio ISA =

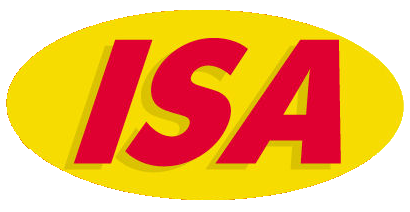

Rochetoirin (La Tour-du-Pin); France
- Broadcast area: France
- Frequencies: 93.9 MHz (Bourgoin-Jallieu); 96.4 MHz (Pont-de-Beauvoisin); 94.7 MHz (Morestel)

Programming
- Format: Adult contemporary music Chanson; Talk radio

Ownership
- Owner: ISA Media Development
- Sister stations: N'Radio; Radio No1

History
- First air date: September 1984

Links
- Website: radio-isa.com

Radio ISA is a French local radio station based at La Tour-du-Pin created in the 1980s and owned by ISA Media Development. Since its creation it is broadcasting only locally in the departments Isère, Savoie and Ain, of which derives the initials of Radio I S A.

Since May 2012, Radio ISA is also broadcasting in and around Grenoble under the name Radio ISA Grenoble.

== Broadcast area ==
Radio ISA:

- Bourgoin-Jallieu : 93.9 FM
- Pont-de-Beauvoisin : 96.4 FM
- Morestel : 94.7 FM

Radio ISA Grenoble:

- Grenoble : 100.4 FM
- La Mure : 88.3 FM
- Voiron : 100.3 FM

== See also ==
- List of radio stations in France, for a full list of French radio stations.
- ISA Media Development, the group owning this station.
- Les Indés Radios, Independent radio stations group in France, of which Radio ISA is member.
