= Radio Nova (France) =

French radio station

Coordinates: 48.9004118°N 2.3371903°E

- France
- Frequencies: 101.5 MHz (Paris); 105.7 MHz (Marseille); 89.8 MHz (Lyon); Full list on website
- RDS: __NOVA__

Programming
- Language: French
- Format: World music Jazz; New wave Reggae

Ownership
- Owner: Nova Press
- Sister stations: TSF Jazz

History
- First air date: 25 May 1981

Links
- Webcast: Live Stream
- Website: nova.fr

Radio Nova (or simply Nova) is a radio station broadcast from Paris, created in 1981 by Jean-François Bizot. Its playlist is characterized by non-mainstream or underground artists of various music genres, such as electro, new wave, reggae, jazz, hip hop and world music.

== History ==
On 25 May 1981, Nova was created through the fusion of several radio stations. Since its creation, the station has been owned by the Nova Press company, which also owns the record label Nova Records and the jazz-oriented radio station TSF Jazz.

From 1985, Radio Nova was oriented mainly around world music, but around 1988 the musical programming was changed to include reggae, funk and rap.

Around 1991, Nova changed its musical programming again, to include acid jazz and French rap. In 1999, its musical programming consisted mainly of Ambient, chill-out and jungle music.

Also in 1999, Nova Press bought the jazz station TSF, which became TSF 89,9 and installed its studios next to those of Radio Nova.

Throughout the station's history, several well-known Parisians have had shows on Radio Nova, including Ariel Wizman, Edouard Baer, Jamel Debbouze, Gilles Peterson, Ivan Smagghe, Laurent Garnier, David Guetta and Yassine Belattar.

In September 2011, Nova and TSF Jazz left the GIE Les Indés Radios to commercialize national advertising via their own Nova Régie. The move came into effect in September 2012.

== Branding ==
=== Logos ===
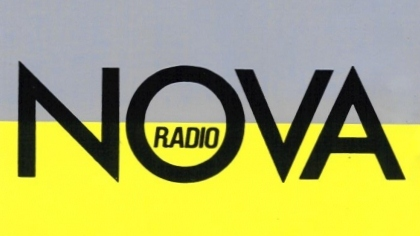
Former Radio Nova logo from 1981 until 1995, with several variations very similar to this logo.

Former Radio Nova logo from 1995 until 2008.

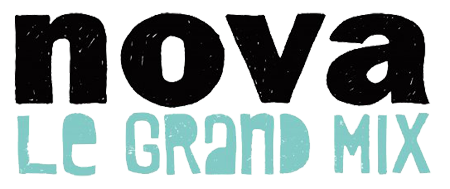
Former Radio Nova logo from 2008 until 2024.

Current Radio Nova logo since 2024.
