= ISA Media Development =

French media company

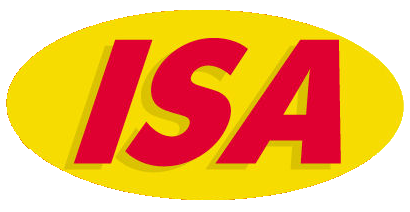
- Company type: Société par actions simplifiée
- Founded: 2008; 18 years ago in Vienne, France
- Founder: Alexandre Pages
- Headquarters: Rochetoirin, France
- Area served: France
- Subsidiaries: N'Radio; Radio ISA; Radio No1
- Website: radio-isa.com nradio.fr radiono1.fr

ISA Media Development is a French media company, which engages in radio publishing and is created in January 2008. ISA Media Development owns the following French local radio stations: Radio ISA, Radio No1 and N'Radio, of which Radio ISA and Radio No1 are member of the GIE of Les Indés Radios.

ISA stands for the three departments where the Radio ISA network is broadcasting: Isère, Savoie and Ain.
