= Vibration (radio station) =

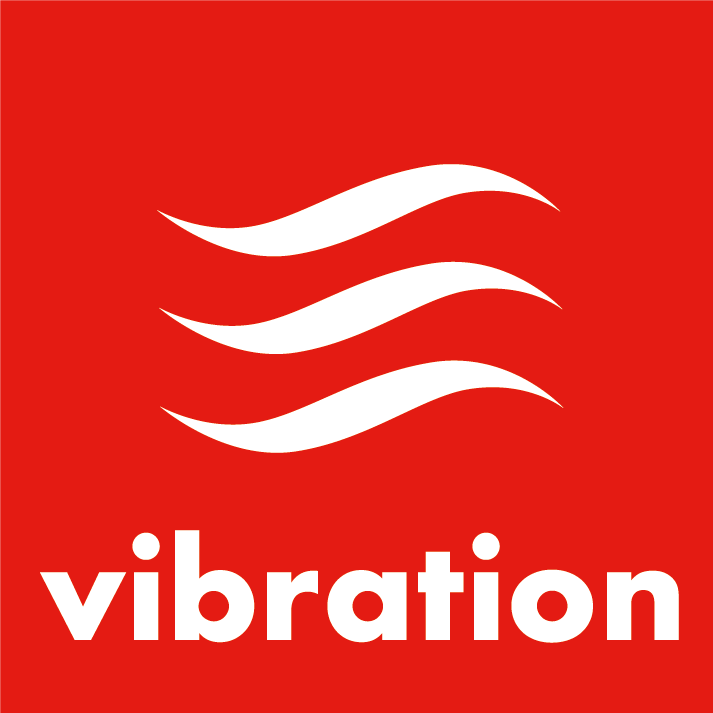

Orléans; France
- Broadcast area: France
- Frequencies: 102.0 MHz (Orléans); Other frequencies

Programming
- Language: French
- Format: Adult contemporary music Top 40

Ownership
- Owner: Groupe 1981
- Sister stations: Ado FM; Black Box (radio); Forum; Latina; Sud Radio; Voltage; Wit FM

History
- First air date: 1982

Links
- Website: www.vibration.fr

Vibration (French pronunciation: [vibʁasjɔ̃] is a French regional radio station, created in 1982 and owned by the Sud Radio Groupe.

== History ==
Vibration was founded in 1982. It was created as a regional station, mainly for the Centre region.

In the early 1990s, Vibration was bought by Groupe Start, which changed its name in 2010 to become Sud Radio Groupe.

== Identity of Vibration ==
=== Logos ===
1982–1986

1986–1993

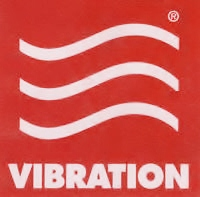
1993–1997

1997–2018

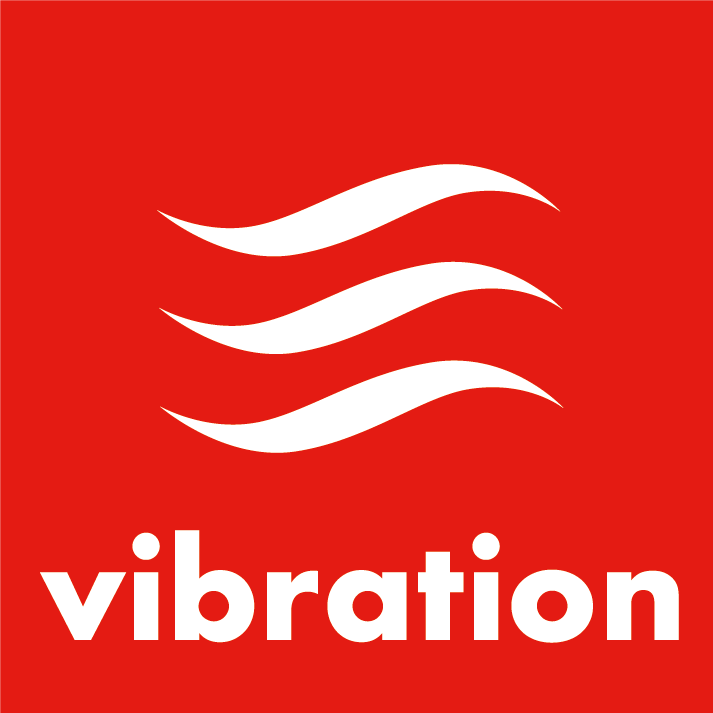
2018–present
