= Chante France =

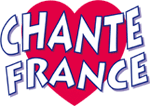
- Paris; France
- Frequency: 90.9 MHz

Programming
- Language: French
- Format: Chanson

Ownership
- Owner: Groupe HPI
- Sister stations: Évasion FM

History
- First air date: 1 January 1994; 32 years ago

Links
- Website: www.chantefrance.com

Chante France is a radio station created in 1994 by Groupe HPI, based in Paris, France. It is largely dedicated to French Chansons. It has 2 transmitters - in Paris and Beauvais, both broadcasting on 90.9 MHz.

It houses the slogan "Les plus belles chansons françaises", a MFM Radio-like slogan (Vos plus belles chansons françaises).

== History ==
On 1 January 1994, Chante France was created and later sponsored by four people of the French radio and chanson : Pierre Bellanger (Skyrock), Stéphane Collaro, Eddie Barclay and mainly Hachette Filipacchi Médias. Originally, it should be the first radio station to compete with the popular French radio station Chérie FM (NRJ Group). But given the scarcity of frequencies in France, the preference was given for the development of Skyrock. The challenge was also to meet state requirements concerning the dissemination of French songs. (amendment Pelchat, 1994).

In November 2010, Groupe Orbus (also owning Skyrock) sold the Chante France station to the HPI Groupe (also owning Évasion FM), which kept the French music only format but added presenters and a complete new logo, and plans to evolve the Parisian station nationally in the future.

On 7 March 2013, Chante France launched its first webradio stations : Chante France 60's, Chante France 70's, Chante France 80's, Chante France Comptines and Chante France Émotion.

== Identity of Chante France ==
=== Logos ===
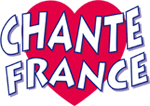
1994–2010

=== Slogans ===
- 1994 – 2002 : Chante France, la 1ère radio sans pub (The first radio without commercials)
- 2009 – 2010 : Chante France, priorité à la musique (Priority to the music)
- Since November 2010 : Le meilleur de la chanson française (The best of the french chanson)

== Programming ==
Chante France bases on the theme 100% chansons françaises (100% French Songs), broadcasting the most beautiful of the chanson française. Hosts and News headlines are present after the repurchase of the Groupe HPI. A short program about astrology presented by Guillaume Cauvigny was the first to talk on the frequency, on the end of the 90's. Today, several hosts are positioned on the air of Chante France.

=== Hosts ===
- Alexandre Amellal : from 10:00–15:00
- Olivier Leroux : from 15:00 til 20:00
- Marie Léty and Robin Grimaldi : Hosting Le Grand Réveil from 6:00 til 10:00.

=== Webradio Stations ===
- Chante France 60's
- Chante France 70's
- Chante France 80's
- Chante France Comptines
- Chante France Émotion

== Broadcasting area ==
Chante France is currently broadcasting on frequencies in Paris and Beauvais only. Chante France is also available in Lyon on Digital Audio Broadcasting. Chante France is also available over the internet.

- Paris: 90.9
- Beauvais: 90.9
- Lyon: Available on DAB
