= HPI Groupe =

French radio publishing company

- Type: Société par actions simplifiée
- Founded: Courcouronnes, France (26 October 1993; 32 years ago)
- Founder: Hervé du Plessix
- Headquarters: Évry-Courcouronnes, France
- Number of locations: 1
- Area served: France
- Key people: Hervé du Plessix (President); Christophe de Lamotte (CEO)
- Website: hpi.fr

S.A.S. HPI Groupe is a French company established in 1993 which engages in radio broadcasting and is based in Courcouronnes, France.

== History ==
In 1993, the HPI Groupe is founded by Hervé du Plessix, and since then he is the President of the company. The HPI Groupe owns Évasion FM, a regional radio station broadcasting in the Île-de-France region, of which Du Plessix is also the President since 1991.

At the end of 2010 HPI acquires the radio station Chante France from Pierre Bellanger (CEO of the French radio network Skyrock) with projects to develop the station nationally.
