= Jordanne FM =

Aurillac; France
- Broadcast area: Cantal, France
- Frequency: 8 frequencies (2017)

Programming
- Language: French

Ownership
- Owner: Fully independent

History
- First air date: 1982

Links
- Website: www.jordannefm.fr

Jordanne FM, is a French private regional radio station created in 1982 member of the economic Interest Grouping "Les Indés Radios" and based at Aurillac (France). The station is mainly broadcasting in the southern part of the Massif Central, and broadcasts mostly music and regional news.

== Broadcasting area ==
Jordanne FM has currently 8 frequencies. Its broadcasting area is located at the crossroads of the three French regions Auvergne-Rhône-Alpes, Nouvelle-Aquitaine and Occitanie. It has a daily audience of about 20,000 listeners. This radio of the Massif Central broadcasts its programs on six departments ( Cantal, Aveyron, Corrèze, Lozère, Haute-Loire, Puy-de-Dôme).
