= Skyrock (social network site) =

Social networking website based in France

Skyrock.com
- Website type: Social networking service
- Available in: French; English; German; Dutch; Italian; Spanish; Portuguese
- Dissolved: 21 August 2023
- Country of origin: France
- Owner: Téléfun
- Website: skyrock.com
- Commercial: Yes
- Registration: Optional
- Launched: 17 December 2002
- Current status: Defunct

Skyrock, also known as Skyblog, was a social networking service (SNS) based in France that offered a free space on the web for users to create blogs, add profiles, and exchange messages with other registered members. Skyrock.com ceased operations on 21 August 2023.

== Background and description ==
Skyrock.com began as a blogging site, Skyblog.com, launched as a side project of Skyrock radio station by its CEO Pierre Bellanger in December 2002. In May 2007, after abandoning the Skyblog.com brand, Skyrock.com was launched as a full-scale social network.

As of June 2008 Skyrock was ranked as the world's seventh largest social network with over 21 million visitors.

The website was shut down on 21 August 2023. According to the Skyrock team, anonymized content has been transferred to the National Archives of France.

== Controversies ==
Skyrock had a high penetration rate in France. In several French middle schools, students used the platform to malign school personnel resulting in their expulsion and in the issuing of alerts by schools to warn parents and students about such behavior.

Furthermore, certain American newspapers attempted to associate the breakout of the 2005 civil unrest in France to users of Skyblogs. However, institutions of the French state never filed any formal complaint indicting the usage of Skyrock Blogs.

A few prominent French institutions created a Skyrock Blog as a preferred tool to communicate messages. An example is the French Equal Opportunities and Anti-Discrimination Commission.
