= M Radio =

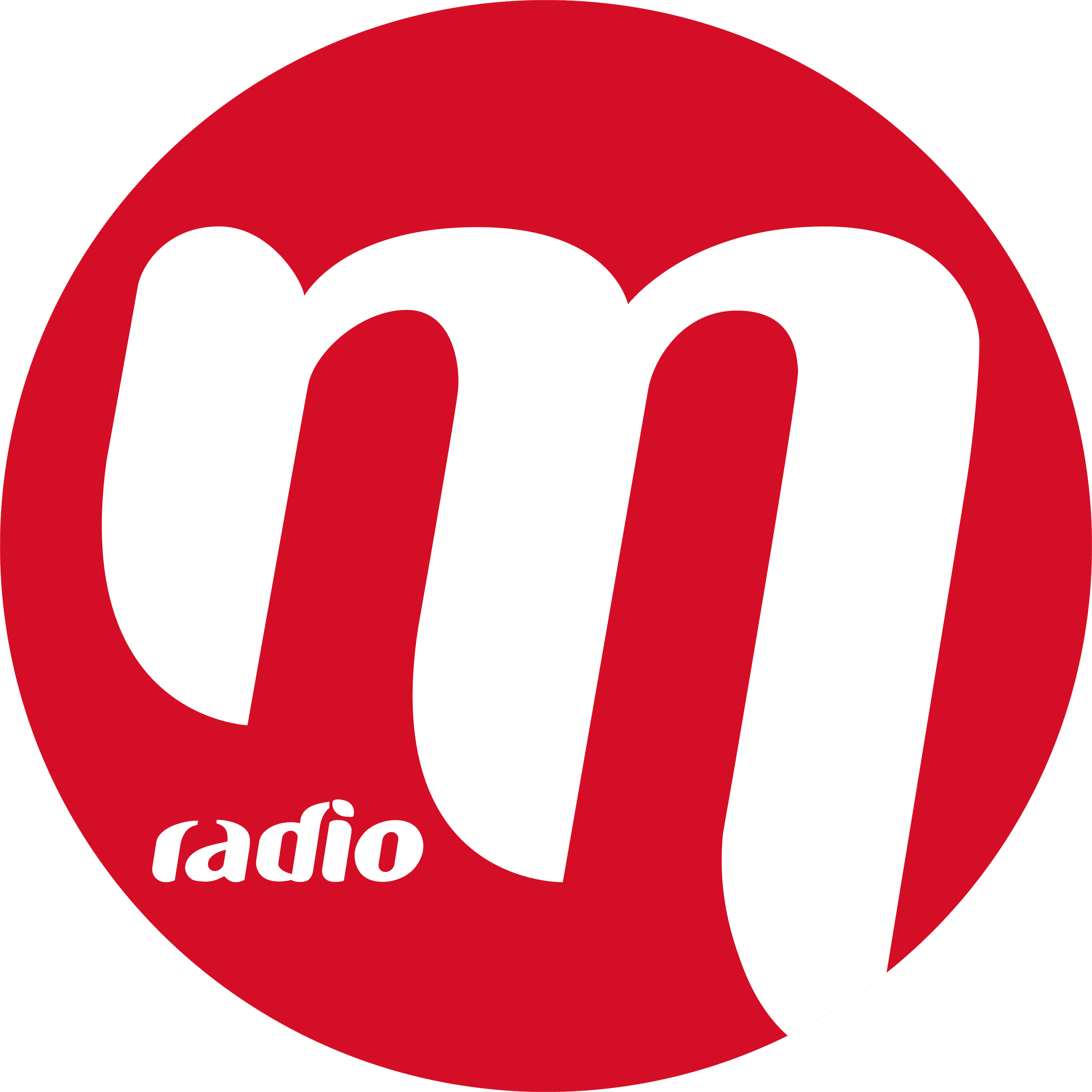
- Lyon; France
- Broadcast area: France; Monaco
- Frequencies: 102.7 MHz (Paris); 93.4 MHz (Marseille); 93.7 MHz (Lyon); Full list of frequencies on MFMradio.fr

Programming
- Language: French
- Format: French Chansons

Ownership
- Owner: Espace Group
- Sister stations: Alpes 1 Générations; Jazz Radio; Là la Radio; La Radio; ODS Radio; Radio Espace; Radio RVA; Radio Sun; Virage Radio

History
- First air date: 1981; 45 years ago
- Former call signs: Radio Montmartre (1981–1995); Montmartre FM (1995–1998); M'FM (1998–2010); Mfm (2010–2017)

Links
- Website: www.mfmradio.fr

M Radio (originally known as MFM Radio) is a radio station, based at Lyon (France) and created in 1981. M is dedicated to only French songs like its local competitor in Île-de-France, Chante France.

== History ==
In 1981, MFM was created in Lyon, then named as Radio Montmartre, and proposed a format essentially based on French chansons from the 1920s till the 1960s. Following a certain success, Radio Montmartre extended its coverage in the late 1980s.

In 1995, it was authorized by the CSA to change its name to "Montmartre FM".

Until 1998, MFM was controlled by the RMC Group. The station was then acquired by LV & Co who were owned by Gérard Louvin. After the purchase, Montmartre FM became known simply as MFM.

In April 2007, the programming was made around a musical format focused on relaxation and emotion, broadcasting mainly songs from the 1970s to today. Since then, it always plays "40 minutes of ad-free music" for EVERY hour of the day.

The format was changed to be aimed at mainly women between 35 and 49 years. The slogan of the station was, at the time, "l'Émotion partagée". At the beginning of 2007, new radio hosts arrived at the radio station, including Thierry Debrune in the morning.

In June 2010, the station had been taken over by the Espace Group based in Lyon.

== Identity of MFM ==
=== Logos ===
Logo of M'FM from 2004 till 2008.

Logo of MFM Radio from October 2010 till December 2017.

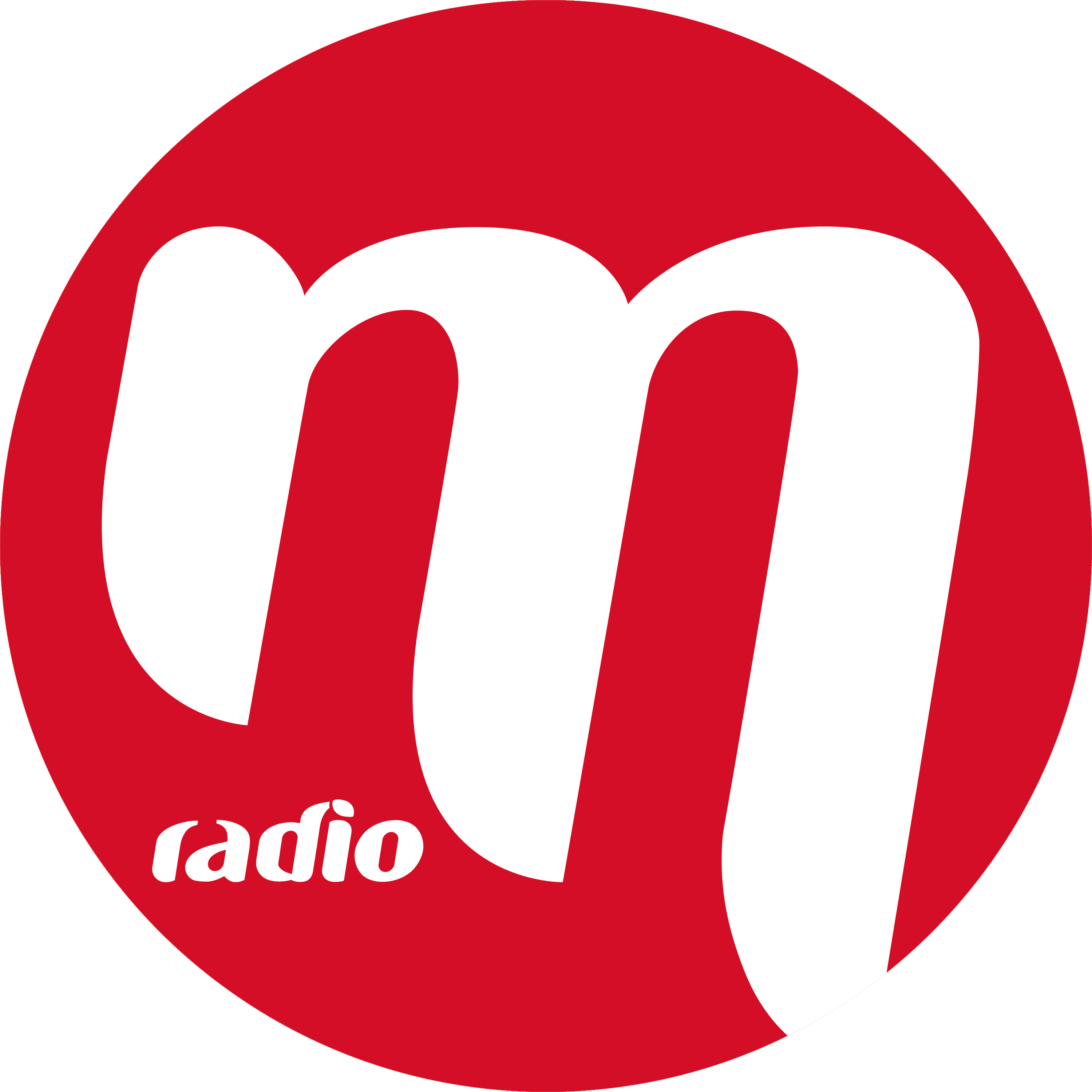
Current M Radio since January 2018.

=== Slogans ===
- 1983 – 1987 : La radio tricolore (The tricolor radio)
- 1987 – 1994 : La radio aimable en vogue (The pleasure radio in vogue)
- 1994 – 1998 : La vie est belle (Life is beautiful)
- 1998 – 2000 : Aime, comme Montmartre (Love, like Montmartre)
- 2000 – 2004 : Les mélodies qu'on aime (Melodies we love)
- 2004 – 2007 : Au cœur de la musique (At the heart of the music)
- 2007 – 2008 : L'emotion partagée (Sharing emotion)
- 2008 – 2009 : Music & Smile
- 2009 – 2009 : Le Mix Variété Pop (The Pop Mix Variety)
- 2009 – 2010 : La Radio Variété Pop (The Pop Variety Radio)
- 2010 – 2011 : Ma French Musique (MFM) (My French Music)
- 6/2011 - 9/2013 : 100% Musique Française (100% French Music)
- 2013 - 2014 : 100% Chanson Française (100% French Songs)
- From 2014 : Vos plus belles chansons françaises (The most beautiful French songs)
- From 2016 : Numéro 1 sur la chanson française (Number 1 on the French songs)
- From 2016 : La radio bleu blanc rouge (The blue white red radio)

== See also ==
- List of radio stations in France
