= Générations =

Paris; France
- Broadcast area: France

Programming
- Language: French

Ownership
- Owner: Espace Group

History
- First air date: 1992

Links
- Website: generations.fr

Générations is a French radio station based in Paris and created in 1992, dedicated to several genres such as hip-hop (rap music and R&B), soul music and disco. On June 15, 1992, EFM Intergénération was definitively authorized to broadcast on the Paris FM band by the CSA.
