= Beur TV =

French television station

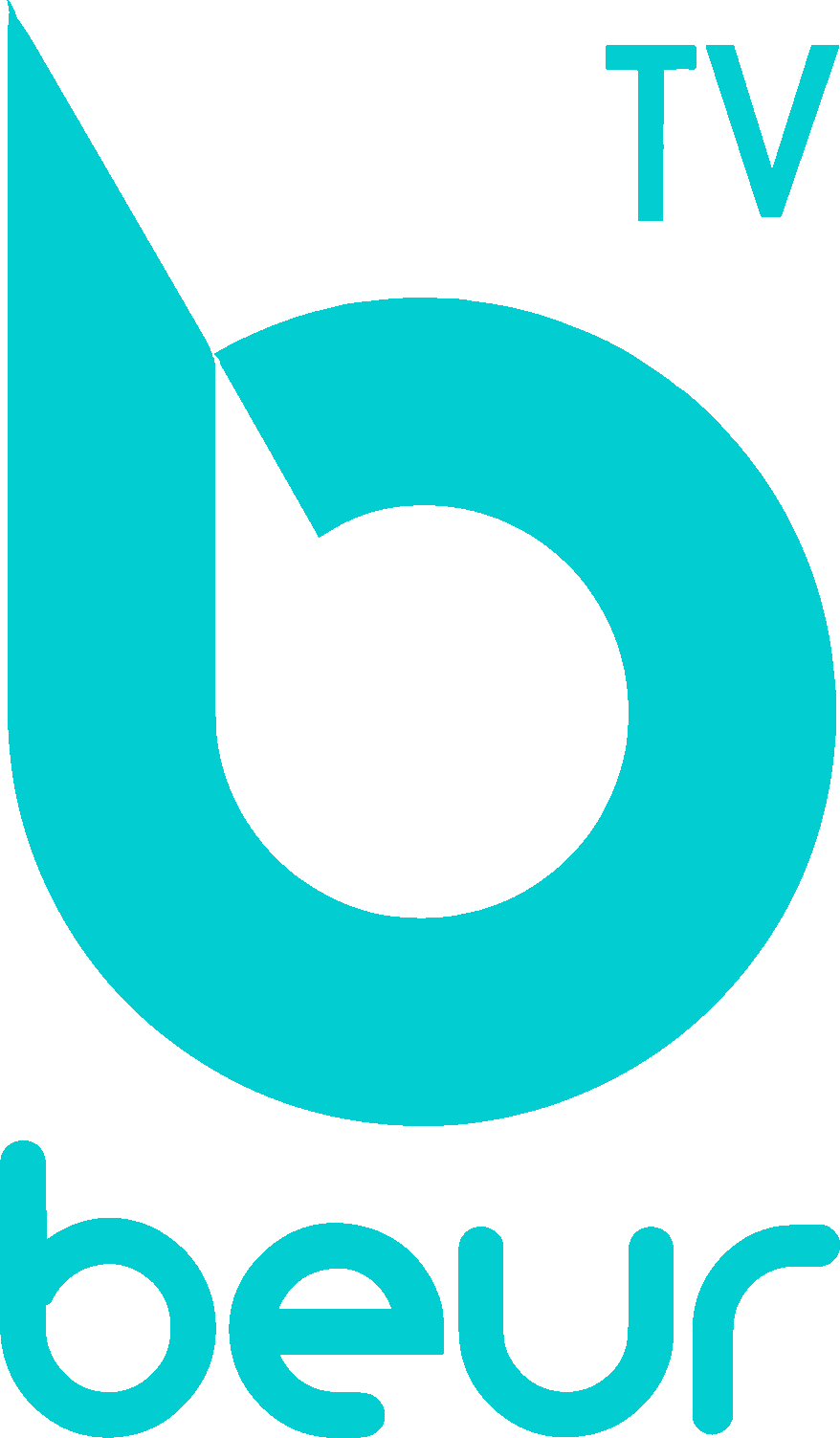
- Country: France

Programming
- Languages: Arabic; French
- Picture format: 576i (SDTV)

Ownership
- Owner: SARL Beur TV

History
- Launched: 3 March 2003; 23 years ago

Beur TV is a French television station mostly addressed to France's Maghrebi communities (Algerians, Moroccans and Tunisians). It is broadcast through cable and offered on ADSL.

The community-based television station was licensed through the Conseil supérieur de l'audiovisuel (CSA) in France on 8 January 2002. The chain started broadcasting on 1 April 2003, and was owned by Algerian-French Nacer Kettane, who was also owner of Beur FM radio station.

The chain developed partnerships with various Maghrebi media to cover important events in those countries, most notably EPTV (Algeria), SNRT (Morocco) and Télévision Tunisienne (Tunisia).

In July 2011, and after the station suffered financial difficulties, Nacer Kettane sold 80% of the enterprise to VOXALGERIE. As a result, programming was more allied with Algerian ENTV output and Arab films. In December 2011, French-language shows returned, a new identifying logo designed and station identifying as Beur FM.tv.

The station is also broadcast on a free satellite channel on Hot Bird 6 at 13° East reaching all European Union member states, Arab league countries in the North Africa and Middle East.

== Programming ==
=== Anime ===
- Digimon
- Dragon Ball Z
- Hunter × Hunter
- The Jungle Book: The Adventures of Mowgli
- Little Women II: Jo's Boys
- Naruto: Shippuden
- Pokémon
- Slam Dunk
- Thunder Jet
- Tokyo Ghoul

== See also ==
- Beur FM
