= Radio Orient =

Arab international radio station based in Paris

France
- Frequencies: 94.3 MHz (Paris); 11 total transmitters
- RDS: ORIENT

Programming
- Languages: Arabic, French

History
- First air date: 1981; 45 years ago

Links
- Website: radioorient.com

Radio Orient (in Arabic إذاعة الشرق pronounced as Iza'at al Sharq) is an Arab international radio station based in Paris, France with retransmissions in various cities in France, Europe and the Arab World.

It was established by Lebanese media entrepreneur Raghid El Chammah in October 1981 and bought by Prime Minister Rafic Hariri on December 27, 1994. It broadcasts mainly in Arabic language with some various programming and news in French language as well. The French station is considered part of Les Indés Radios, a groupement d'intérêt économique (Economic Interest Grouping) created in 1992, and currently composed of 125 local radio stations in France.

It is mainly interested in the Arab World and Middle Eastern issues in addition to catering to Arab diaspora and Muslim communities in France and Europe. It operates on basis of a moderate and tolerant Arab standpoint respectful of the laic traditions of France.

The station also runs a parallel radio station also called Radio Orient in Lebanon, mostly with independent programming from the French station, although some news are rebroadcast from the Paris feed. The Lebanese studios are situated in the Lebanese capital Beirut.

== Frequencies ==
=== France ===
Situation on 1 March 2014
| City / Department | Sector | Frequency | Power | Transmission from |
|---|---|---|---|---|
| Paris (75) | Île-de-France | 94.3 MHz | 4 kW | Paris |
| Oise (60) | Beauvais | 94.3 MHz | 500 W | Aux Marais |
| Eure (27) | Évreux | 106.5 MHz | 1 kW | Gravigny |
| Eure-et-Loir (28) | Dreux | 106.6 MHz | 1 kW | Vernouillet (Eure-et-Loir) |
| Rhône (69) | Lyon | 106.7 MHz | 1 kW | Lyon |
| Isère (38) | Vienne, Isère | 97.7 MHz | 1 kW | Sainte-Colombe (Rhône) |
| Haute-Savoie (74) | Annemasse | 92.7 MHz | 500 W | Monnetier-Mornex |
| Var (83) | Toulon | 89.4 MHz | 2 kW | Six-Fours-les-Plages |
| Loiret (45) | Montargis | 91.4 MHz | 300 W | Amilly (Loiret) |
| Gironde (33) | Bordeaux | 106.4 MHz | 5 kW | Bouliac |
| Loire-Atlantique (44) | Nantes | 92.4 MHz | 200 W | Saint-Herblain |

There are also retransmissions in Besançon, Charleville-Mézières, Châlons-en-Champagne, Limoges et Saint-Dizier.

=== Northern Africa and Western Asia ===
Lebanon

- Beirut - 88.7 MHz
- Saida - 88.3 MHz
- Tripoli - 88.3 MHz

Egypt

- Alexandria - 88.7 MHz
