= Berceuses (radio station) =

Berceuses.com
Paris; France
- Broadcast area: France

Programming
- Format: Lullabies, baby songs

Ownership
- Owner: Julien Bocher

History
- First air date: June 2021

Links
- Webcast: player.radioking.io/berceuses1/
- Website: berceuses.com

Berceuses.com, usually just referred to as Berceuses, (lit. "Lullabies" in French) is an online radio station hosted on RadioKing broadcasting lullabies for babies. It broadcasts 24/7 with the lullabies, and it claims that it offers "The softest possible musical instrumentalization and arranging to promote sleep and calm, but also to allow parents to hum lullabies." The lullabies also can be covers of popular songs, as well as lullaby covers for 80s songs, and they also have playlists for their most listened to playlists, which are available through their website.

The radio station was established in June 2021, and is the first French radio station dedicated solely to toddlers. According to the le Parisien, it features over 600 titles for children of 0 to 3 years. The radio station is also available on the App Store for free.

The Le Monde website states that it: "emphasizes that of their [the baby's] learning skills, their logic and memorisation, but also of promoting their concentration."

According to the founder, Julien Bocher, his inspiration behind the idea was "relatively alone at home, when I was a kid, it was the radio, and especially the top 50 [a music list]. It was like a best friend [to me]."

== Playlist information ==
Their main playlist is called "Lullabies Radio Doudou," and it has about 1.6 thousand monthly listeners, though their 5 most popular songs have all surpassed 200,000 listeners in total.

== Language ==
The website is available online and can be accessed relatively easily through their website. The songs they broadcast don't tend to have words so can be listened to by anyone, although the website is based in France and so it has French language words.

== Similar topics ==
- Lullabies
- Instrumental music
- List of radio stations in France
- Radio Barbouillot (children's radio station)
