= Victoire Loup =

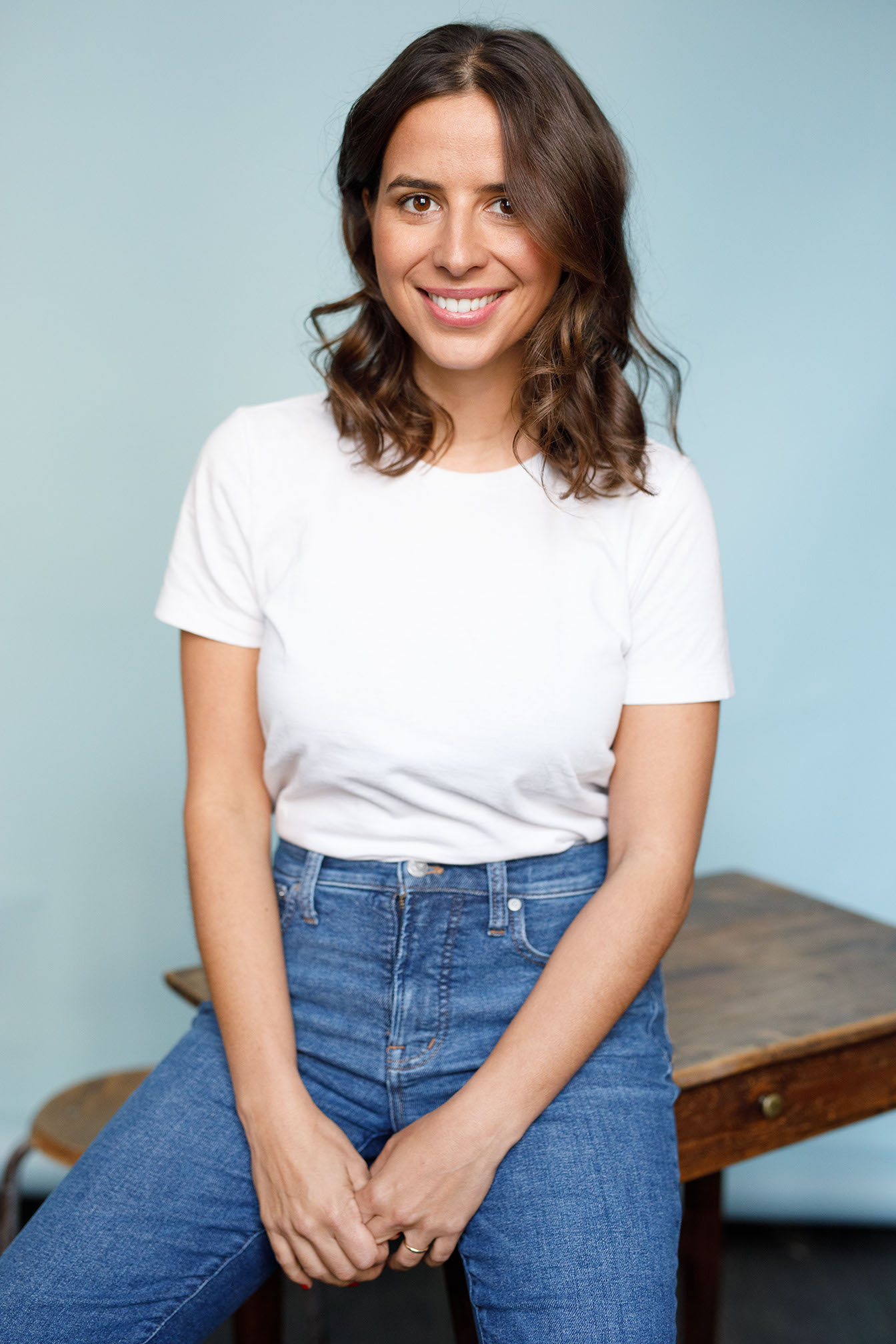
- Education: UCL, SciencesPo
- Occupation: Food writer

Victoire Loup is a food writer, culinary consultant and cookbook author.

== Biography ==
Born in Cannes in a family of perfumers, Victoire Loup grew up in Paris and began her studies in London. During her Masters at SciencesPo, she did an internship at Le Fooding and became their marketing director the following year. She worked on events in Paris and New York City with chefs such as Yotam Ottolenghi, Alain Passard, Cyril Lignac, Enrique Olvera, Christina Tosi... In 2015, she moved to California and continued writing restaurant reviews in France and the United States. She appeared as a guest judge on Gordon Ramsay’s 24 Hours to Hell and Back and Food Network's Alex vs. America. With her consulting agency, she advises chefs and brands such as Ludo Lefebvre, Pommery, Cartier, or Airbnb. In December 2021, Victoire Loup was named "cookbook author of the year" by French magazine Konbini.

== Books ==
Published after the 2020 lockdown, À La Maison compiles 60 recipes and anecdotes which reveal the culinary intimacy of world-famous chefs such as Pierre Gagnaire, Anne-Sophie Pic, Christophe Michalak, or Pierre Hermé. 100% of the sales profits from À La Maison are donated to the Paris-based charity Ernest, which distributes produce baskets to families in need.

Cuites, based on an original idea by Human Humans and chef Arnaud Jourdan, lifts the veil on hangover recipes by the most famous chefs in France: Philippe Conticini, Alexia Duchêne, Juan Arbelaez, Michel Roth, etc. 60 MOF, Michelin-starred chefs, and bistronomy cooks tell the story of a particular evening and the dish that saved them the morning after.

Chaud, the third opus with Human Humans, features the recipes which 60 chefs prepare to seduce someone: César Troisgros, Chloé Charles, Mory Sacko, Manon Fleury... Parity is strictly respected and the book shares personal anecdotes where each chef reveals the story behind their dish.

Régalades, Victoire Loup’s first cookbook with Hachette Cuisine, lists the 500 best ingredients in the world. For each one, the book describes its history, what makes it unique, and how to cook it, with advice and recipes from numerous famous chefs.

In October 2021, Human Humans announced that Victoire Loup’s cookbooks would now be copublished jointly with Hachette. Chaud inaugurates this capsule collection, and new editions of À la Maison as well as Cuites will be added to Hachette Cuisine’s catalog.

== Miscellaneous work ==
On top of her books, Victoire Loup is a guest judge on several TV shows: Alex vs. America, Gordon Ramsay's 24 Hours to Hell and Back, Top Chef, etc. In January 2022, she recorded the masterclass How to become a food critic for the platform Majelan.

She's also a regular contributor to Architectural Digest, Le Fooding, ICON, etc.

== Bibliography ==
- À La Maison - 60 recettes de chefs au foyer, Human Humans, 2020 (ISBN 2-01-716853-X)
- Cuites - 60 recettes faciles pour lendemains difficiles, Human Humans, 2020 (ISBN 2-01-716852-1)
- Régalades - 500 produits d'exception à se faire livrer chez soi, Hachette Cuisine, 2021 (ISBN 2-01-946039-4)
- Chaud - 60 recettes pour séduire aux fourneaux, Human Humans et Hachette Cuisine, 2021 (ISBN 2-01-716850-5)
- Festin - 60 recettes pour se retrouver, Human Humans et Hachette Cuisine, 2022 (ISBN 2-01-720133-2)
- Inspirations - 10 histoires de création en pâtisserie, La Martinière, 2022 (ISBN 979-10-401-1178-8)
