= Robert Zuili =

French clinical psychologist

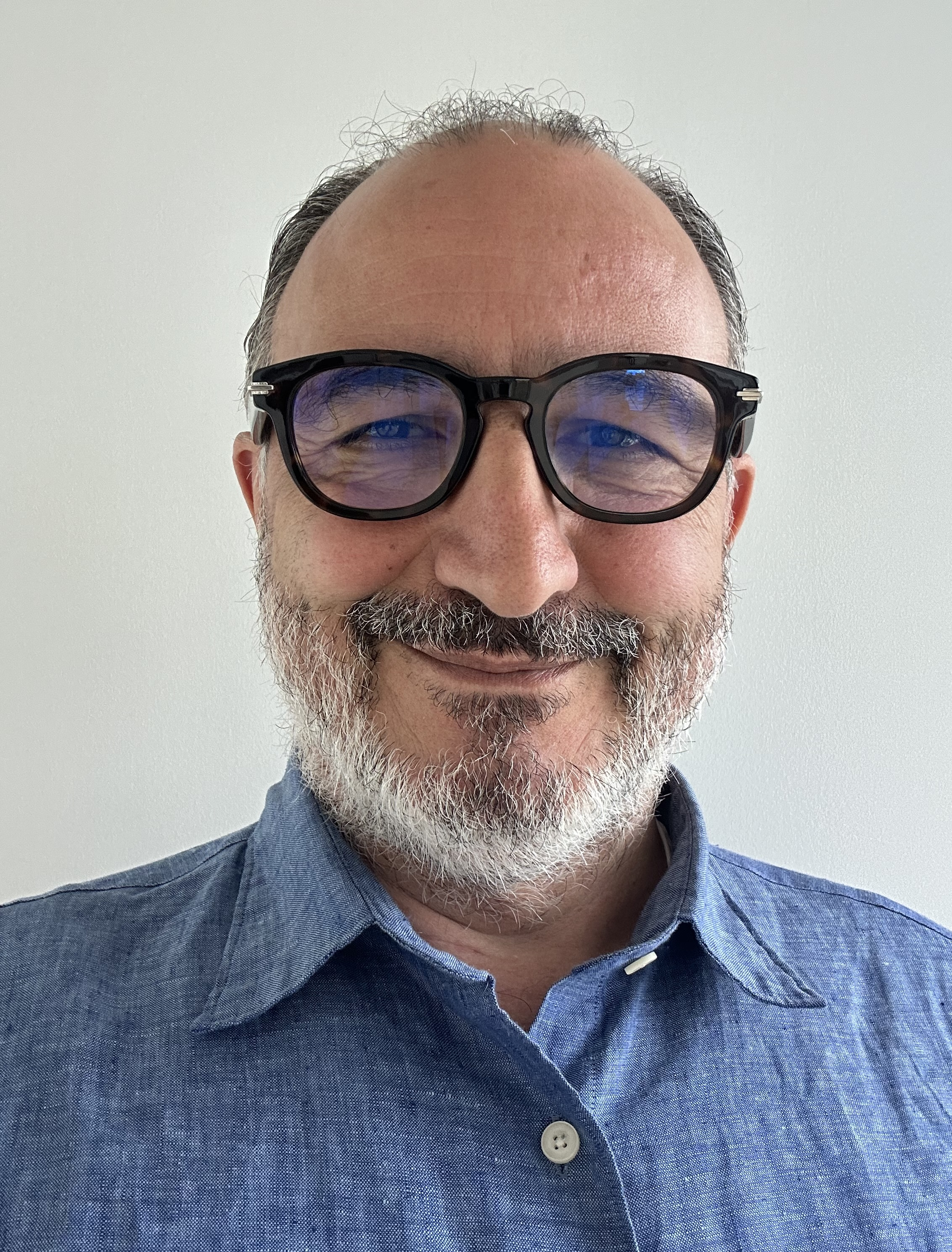
- Born: March 31, 1964 (age 62); Montpellier, France
- Education: Sorbonne University
- Occupations: writer, clinical psychologist
- Writing career
- Notable works: Les clés de nos émotions (The Keys to Our Emotions) and Relations amoureuses (Love Relations)

Robert Zuili (born March 31, 1964) is a French clinical psychologist, temporary professor (EM Lyon), radio columnist (Sud Radio), and entrepreneur. He is the author of books about the influence of emotions on relationships, professional development and well-being, including Les clés de nos émotions (The Keys to Our Emotions) and Relations amoureuses (Love Relations).

== Biography ==
Robert Zuili was born in Montpellier on March 31, 1964, where he grew up until he was three years old. His father René is the son of a former member of the French Resistance, Jacques, who was born in Egypt and was the Mayor of Villemomble. He worked as an HR consultant at the Center for Applied Psychology and Cabinet Bernard Krief. Also, he worked in the fields of video games, Internet and telecommunications.

In 2003, Zuili co-founded an HR consulting firm, Excelia (now Emosense).

In 2011, Robert Zuili in cooperation with a scientific institute (PEARSON) created a tool for measuring the levels of well-being and/or suffering of employees, based on the functional or dysfunctional emotional mechanisms. In 2020, he launched a platform dedicated to companies: Work Well Together.

== Studies and theoretical approaches ==
The human relationship is approached by Robert Zuili from the angle of the quality of emotional interactions. He explained through a model called the "Rope Theory" how the bond is built between people. Like a rope, the relationship is made up of fibers, called the 5 emotional fibers of the relationship: feeling, deep compatibility, complementarity, connivance, and understanding. The feeling: it is the capacity that we have to understand each other when we speak to each other. Deep compatibility: it is the fact of sharing values, an ideology, that brings us closer together or separates us. Complementarity is when we are able to feed the exchange with opposing, similar or complementary points of view. Connivance: it is the ability we have to be aligned with our feelings in the face of everyday events. The understanding: the higher the understanding, the more it reflects the low risk of conflict in the relationship.

Robert Zuili determines that there are mainly three filters that condition our relationship to the world and influence our perception and understanding: The Real, the Imaginary and the Symbolic.

== Private life ==
Robert Zuili first married in 1988. In this marriage, he and his spouse had four children. He married a second time in 2012. The couple had 2 children.

== Bibliography ==
- Découvrez votre émotion dominante: avec un nouvel outil de coaching, la Chaîne de Valeur Émotionnelle (2008), ISBN 978-2100515202
- Relations amoureuses (2013), ISBN 978-2317004018
- Les clés de nos émotions: Peur, colère, tristesse, joie : les comprendre pour mieux les maîtriser (2014), ISBN 978-2317003981
- Comprendre les émotions de nos enfants (0–10 ans) (2015), ASIN: B017861RNW ISBN 9782317004339
- Mieux communiquer grâce aux émotions (2015), ISBN 9782317017018
- Comment surmonter sa tristesse ? (2015), ISBN 9782317017001
- Comment maîtriser ses peurs ? (2015), ISBN 9782317016974
- Le pouvoir des liens (2015), ISBN 9782317032608
