= Nova Press =

French media company

Coordinates: 48°51′15″N 2°22′40″E

- Company type: Société anonyme
- Industry: activities of head offices
- Founded: Paris, France (1972)
- Founder: Jean-François Bizot
- Headquarters: Paris, France
- Number of locations: 4
- Area served: France
- Key people: Daniel Richard (President/CEO); Bruno Delport (COO)
- Website: novaplanet.com

Nova Press is a French media company established in 1972 by Jean-François Bizot. Nova Press was registered on 4 June 1981.

The company most notably owns the radio stations Radio Nova and TSF Jazz.

== Sectors ==
- Radio: Radio Nova and TSF Jazz
- Internet: Novanet (web design in mainly the field of music, including Nova Planet
- Record label: Nova Records
- Advertising: Nova Régie
- Content Production: Nova Production
- Publishing: Nova Éditions
