= Beur FM =

- France
- Frequencies: 106.7 MHz (Paris); 96.9 MHz (Toulouse); Full list of frequencies

Programming
- Languages: French; Arabic

History
- First air date: 1989

Links
- Website: www.beurfm.net

Beur FM is a French local radio station catering mainly to France's Maghrebi communities including: Algerians, Moroccans and Tunisians.

Beur FM broadcasts in three languages: French (60% of the time), Arabic, including Maghrebi Arabic (20% of the time), and Berber (20% of the time).

== Name ==
The station was launched in 1981 as "Radio Beur", later renamed "Beur FM". The word beur is the Verlan form of arabe.

== History ==
It is the first and the most prominent maghrébine community station in France. Around 1989, the independent radio station started broadcasting on a licensed frequency. The station was established by Algerian-French Nacer Kettane in Paris. Kettane had been a prominent figure in the "beur movement" in the 1980s and 1990s and already had media interests by launching the monthly Sans frontière (meaning Without borders). It broadcast on 98.2 MHz. In 1992 the Parisian station changed its frequency, to broadcast on 106.7 MHz.

Later in the 1990s, Beur FM started broadcasting nationally, and presently it broadcasts on 18 frequencies in France and has a large and diversified listenership. Beur FM broadcasts 24 hours a day and its main frequency is FM 106.7 MHz for Île-de-France region in Paris. Beur FM also became part of the GIE Les Indés Radios. The station has acquired around 20 frequencies. It has an audience of around 1% of the listeners in Ile-de-France. 2019 figures showed the station was improving further on its audience levels. Although it primarily addresses Frances North African communities, the station also wants to enlarge its listenership base by actively addressing audiences outside the North African communities. Kettane sold his shares to Serge Dassault in July 2014.

In April 2003, Beur TV was created, which was a television version based on Beur FM. Beur TV partnered with Maghreb TV stations ENTV (Algeria), SNRT and 2M TV (Morocco) and ERTT (Tunisia).

Abdelkrim Branine, is the chief editor of its new section. In May 2015, the French periodical Marianne citing its programme "Les Zinformés" accused the station of being pro-islamist. The station refuted the allegations. The radio publicly says it is a secular radio station.

The station popularized the term "Beur" for North Africans in France although the term is considered somewhat pejorative and restrictive in some circles. Beur FM has also released a number of Oriental and North African based music albums like Generation Beur FM (2001), Rai 4 Ever (2010) and Beur FM présente Oriental Clubbing (2012) amongst others. The station has also established a literary award, "Le Prix littéraire Beur FM Méditerranée" in collaboration with TV 5 Monde.

== See also ==
- Beur TV
