= Radio Espace =

French radio station

Lyon; France
- Broadcast area: France
- Frequencies: 96.9 MHz (Lyon); 105.7 MHz (Vallée d'Azergues); 97.5 MHz (Sainte-Foy-l'Argentière)

Programming
- Format: Dance

Ownership
- Owner: Espace Group
- Sister stations: Alpes 1 Générations; Jazz Radio; Là la Radio; La Radio Plus; MFM Radio; ODS Radio; Radio Sun; RVA; Virage Radio

History
- First air date: 1990s

Links
- Website: radioespace.com

Radio Espace is a French local radio station created in the mid-1990s, broadcasting mainly in and around the city of Lyon. The station is owned by the Espace Group.

The station's format is mainly Dance, RnB and Groove music.

== History ==
Radio Espace was created in the early 1990s as a local independent radio station, in a maison de la culture, "Espace Jean Bargoin", located in Lyon.

Around 1998, Radio Espace is purchased by Christophe Mahé to make the radio station become part of Espace Group. Some time later, Radio Espace becomes member of the GIE of regional independent radio stations of Les Indépendants (The Independents).

== See also ==
- Jazz Radio, a sister station dedicated to jazz music.
- Espace Group, the group owning this station.
- Les Indés Radios, a GIE of independent radio stations in France.
