= Radio Alfa =

- France
- Broadcast area: France

Programming
- Languages: Portuguese and French

History
- First air date: 1987

Technical information
- Transmitter coordinates: 48.8860°N 2.4229°E

Links
- Website: radioalfa986.net

Radio Alfa is a French radio station broadcast from Paris, aimed at the Portuguese community. It broadcasts to Ile-de-France on 98.6 MHz. Its studios are based in Créteil.

== See also ==
- Les Indépendants
- Frequency modulation
- Radio
