= Radio Fréquence Nîmes =

Radio Fréquence Nîmes is a French radio station in the town of Nîmes (Gard) founded in 1982, as Radio Nîmes.

== Story ==
Radio Fréquence Nîmes known by the diminutive of R.f.n or Radio Nîmes is created in an associative goal. It broadcasts mainly of French song (which she is an advocate) and to a lesser extent Italian and Spanish song and European in general. Radio Fréquence Nîmes, also broadcasts the games of club Nîmes Olympique but only those at home. Today Radio Fréquence Nîmes station (R.F.N) is broadcast on 92.2 FM on Nîmes and its region and also streaming on the official website of the station and also the famous Streaming radio broadcast site TuneIn.

== Key Dates ==
- 1982, Creating Station Wednesday, May 26, 1982, by the founders of Radio Fréquence Nîmes (RFN) Alain Matthieu & Henric Quettelart, better known under the pseudonym Jean Orsi
- 2015, October 15, 2015, death of Jean Orsi, in the morning at the age of 74 years .
- 2015, October 17, 2015, is the day of the ceremony animators in honor of the creator of Radio Fréquence Nîmes (RFN).
- Since April 1, 2016, the name is changed from Radio Nîmes to Radio Fréquence Nîmes; it broadcast The new 3G (Les Grandes Gueules Gard) emissions created by Olivier Jalaguier, with six others quo-founders, Les Grandes Gueles du Gard intended to evoked news Gard department & its region.

== Entertainers ==
- René Becamel
- Edith Quettelart
- Jean-Pierre Roigt
- Marcel Pont
- Evelyne Paulin
- Lionel Allemand
- Emile Bocquet dit Milou
- Daniel
- Hélène
- Gaby
- Bruno
- Patrick

== Actual Emissions ==
- News of l'(AFP) (Duration 2 minutes) (All Monday's to Friday's every hours start at 7 h to 19 h)
- Musique non stop (All Week and Weekend, start at 19 h to 7 h)
- Chansons Rétros (All Saturday's, Daniel et Helène, start at 17 h to 18 h)
- Jean-Pierre Roigt (All Tuesday, Jean-Pierre, start at 17 h to 19 h)
- Edith Quettelart (All Wednesday's, Edith, start at 17 h to 19 h)
- Les Grandes Gueules du Gard (All Tuesday's & Friday's start at 11 h 00 to 13 h 00)

== Logos ==
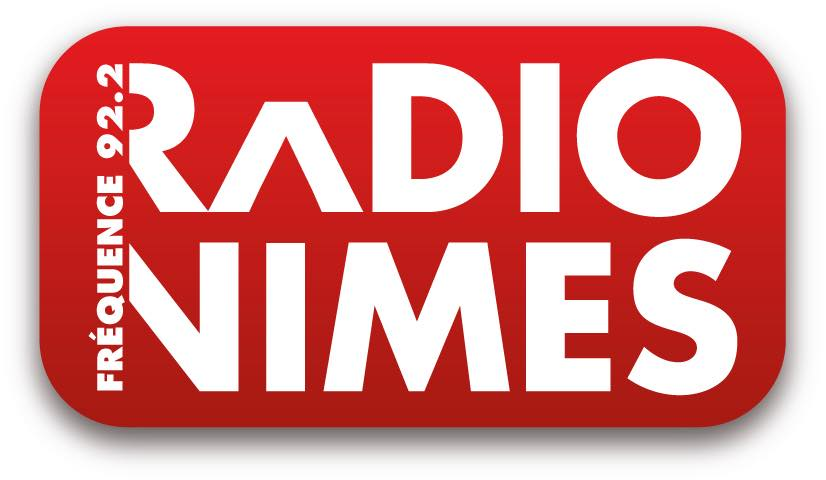
Actual Logos

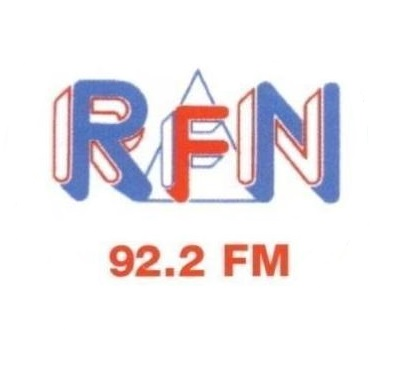
Old Logos

== See also ==
=== Connexial Article ===
- Nîmes

=== External links ===
- Site de Radio Fréquence Nîmes
