= Évasion FM =

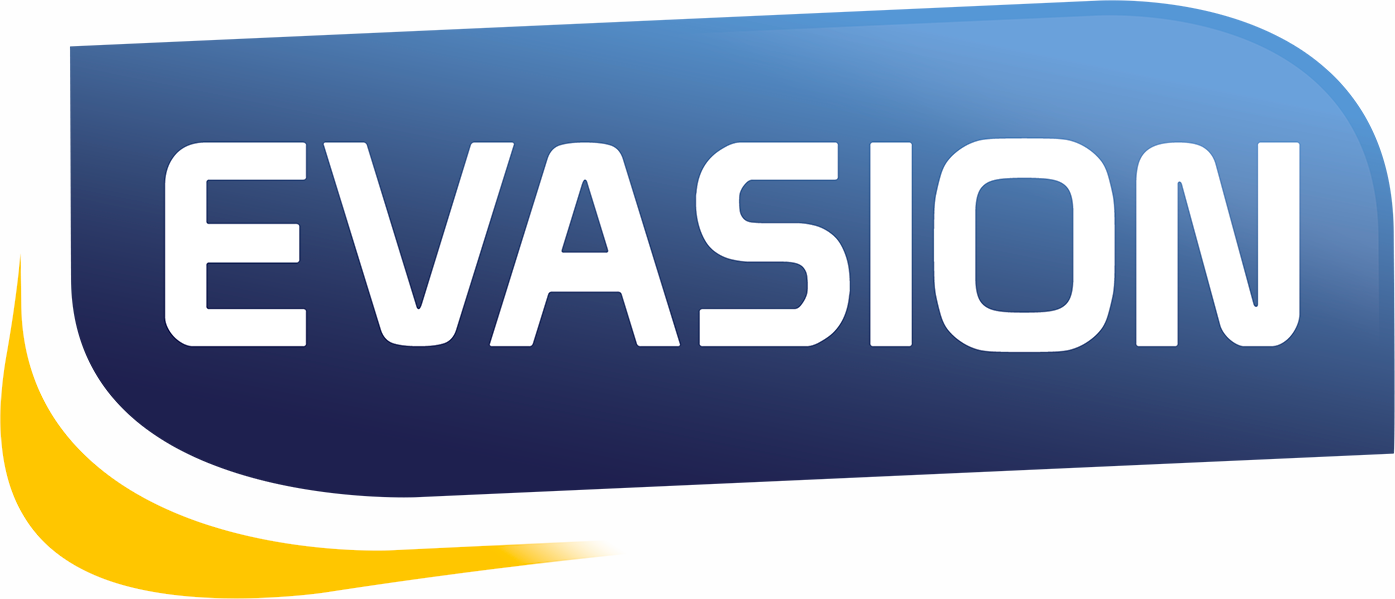
- Évry; France
- Broadcast area: Île-de-France, France
- Frequency: 20 frequencies (2023)

Programming
- Language: French

Ownership
- Owner: Groupe HPI
- Sister stations: Chante France

History
- First air date: 1983; 43 years ago

Links
- Website: www.evasionfm.com

Évasion FM (styled EVASION), is a French private regional radio station created in 1983 owned by the HPI Groupe and based at Évry, in Paris. The station mainly broadcasts in the Parisian suburbs, and broadcasts mostly music and regional news.

== Broadcasting area ==
Évasion FM has currently 20 frequencies throughout 8 departments. Additionally, Évasion FM is also available on several websites on the Internet such as the official website.

=== Essonne ===
- Dourdan : 92.5 MHz
- Évry : 99.3 MHz

=== Eure ===
- Bernay : 101.7 MHz

=== Eure-et-Loir ===
- Dreux : 99.2 MHz

=== Oise ===
- Beauvais : 89.7 MHz
- Clermont : 102.1 MHz
- Creil : 99.7 MHz
- Formerie : 93.3 MHz

=== Seine-et-Marne ===
- Fontainebleau : 88.8 MHz
- La-Ferté-Sous-Jouarre : 88.0 MHz
- Meaux : 88.8 MHz
- Melun : 88.0 MHz
- Nemours : 92.5 MHz
- Provins : 95.5 MHz

=== Seine Maritime ===
- Gournay-En-Bray : 106.2 MHz

=== Somme ===
- Abbeville : 94.4 MHz
- Amiens : 97.7 MHz
- Péronne : 103.4 MHz

=== Yvelines ===
- Mantes La Jolie : 101.7 MHz
- Rambouillet : 88.0 MHz
