= Sud Radio =

- Labège, Haute-Garonne (until 2017); Courbevoie, Hauts-de-Seine (since 2017); France
- Broadcast area: France; Andorra
- Frequencies: 99.9 MHz (Paris) (as Sud Radio+); 95.1 MHz (Marseille); Full list of frequencies on SudRadio.fr

Programming
- Languages: French (formerly in Spanish and Catalan)
- Format: Pop, chansons, talk

Ownership
- Owner: Fiducial Médias

History
- First air date: 18 September 1958
- Former call signs: Andorradio (1958–1961); Radio des Vallées d'Andorre (1961–1966)

Links
- Webcast: Sud Radio: Live; Sud Radio+: Live
- Website: www.sudradio.fr

Sud Radio is a French privately owned radio station, founded in 1958. Until 2017, it was headquartered in Labège, Haute-Garonne near Toulouse, before it moved to Courbevoie, Hauts-de-Seine. This relocation to the Parisian region allows for the radio to host more politicians and other personalities for studio interviews.

== History ==
On 29 October 1951, ANDORRADIO S.A. was constituted with an ownership of 51% by Sofirad, with the aim to create a new radio station in Andorra; the station eventually started broadcasting on 18 September 1958 and was named Andorradio. On 29 March 1961 an agreement was signed allowing two stations to transmit from Andorra. The French radio, previously called Radio des Vallées d'Andorre ("Radio of the Valleys of Andorra") became Sud Radio ("Radio South") in 1966.

In March 1986, Sud Radio received permission to transmit on the French FM band. The following year, the group Laboratoires Pierre Fabre took control of Sud Radio along regional investors. In turn, the radio took a majority interest in 1990 to acquire one of the first local radio stations in France, previously held entirely by the professional football club Girondins de Bordeaux: Wit FM.

In 1994, Sud Radio expanded its broadcasting area, now covering 22 departments in the south of France. Revenues of the group passed the 100 million French francs in 1995. In 1997, the program of Sud Radio began broadcasting on the bouquet of Canal Satellite.

In 2001, the CSA assigned four new frequencies to Sud Radio in the regions Auvergne and Limousin (in Brive, Ussel, Mauriac and Puy-en-Velay).

In November 2005, the group Laboratoires Pierre Fabre sold Sud Radio to the holding Sudporter owned by the group Start, based in Orléans. A new grid was launched the following year along with a new logo, a new, more Top-40 Pop format and the slogan "Show & Info".

In 2008, Sud Radio moved its studios to Labège near Toulouse and inaugurated a permanent correspondent in Marseille. A new transmitter allowed additional coverage in Marseille and Aix-en-Provence and made a potential audience of more than 1.3 million people.

In November 2010, the Conseil supérieur de l'audiovisuel (CSA) allowed Sud Radio transmit in Clermont-Ferrand and Limoges. That same year, the Start group changed its name to become Sud Radio Groupe. In January 2011, the CSA selected Sud Radio to transmit in Paris for the Parisian area and Île-de-France region on the frequency 99.9 FM; it began broadcasting on 10 August 2011.

In spring 2012, after finding out and admitting his failure in the field of the private radio station, Jean-Éric Valli decided to sell Sud Radio. In November 2012 exclusive negotiations with Marc Laufer (former CEO of NextRadioTV) got underway for the acquisition of the station. His project called for Sud Radio's format to become a generalist business news radio station, similar to BFM Business. On 14 February 2013, however, Sud Radio Group announced that they ceased negotiations with Marc Laufer.

On April 4, 2013, CSA finally validated the transfer of the radio to Fiducial. On September 9, 2013, the takeover of Sud Radio for an amount of 7 million euros from the Sud radio groupe by Fiducial medias was validated by CSA. Fiducial Médias undertook to "strengthen and clarify the contractual stipulations relating to the maximum share of airtime devoted to music with regard to other programs, in particular information and entertainment, as well as the place given to rugby in the programs, and for the category B convention of the Sud Radio service, at the times of dissemination of information and headings of the regional program.

== Identity of Sud Radio ==
=== Slogans ===
- 1958–1970s: La plus haute station d'Europe !
- 1981–1986: La radio des Sudistes
- 1986–1990: La radio... C'est Sud, bien entendu !
- 1990–1996: Sud Radio, l'air de la vie !
- 1996–1998: Côté radio, on est tous Sud de cœur !
- 1998: On est Sud de cœur, et d'esprit !
- 1998–2005: Écoutez pour voir !
- 2006–2010: Show & Info
- 2010–2011: La radio généraliste du Sud
- 2011–2012: Ouvrez-la !
- 2012–2014: L'esprit libre
- 2014–2017: Apprendre et comprendre
- 2017–2018: Prenez la parole
- 2018–present: Parlons vrai

=== Programmes ===
This is a list with the current programming of Sud Radio sorted alphabetically:

- Brunch Média
- Brunch Politique
- Christine Bouillot et Jean-Louis Verger
- Guillet dans la mêlée
- Histoire des Suds
- Karim Hacène
- La grande matinée: Morning show from 6:30 until 10:00, from Monday till Friday hosted by Marc Leval.
- La grande matinée - Weekend: Morning show from 7:00 until 12:00, only on Saturday and Sunday and hosted by Alexis Thiébaut.
- Le 18-20 de Sud Radio: Radio show from 18:00 until 20:00, hosted by Christine Bouillot and Jean-Louis Vergé.
- Le Brunch Médias
- Le coeur au Sud
- Le magazine Rugby & Sports: Every Sunday the latest sports news about football, rugby, basketball, among others, hosted by Jean-Louis Vergé.
- Le Duo des Non
- Leval sait tout
- Marc Leval
- Pascal Bataille
- Peggy Broche
- Sortie Sud
- Sud Radio, c'est vous
- Tube Story
- Zapping Sud

=== Logos ===
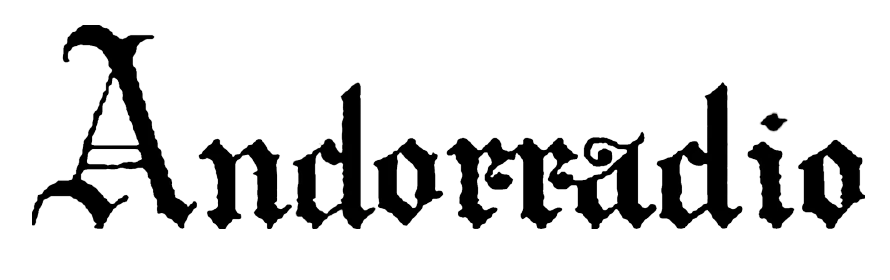
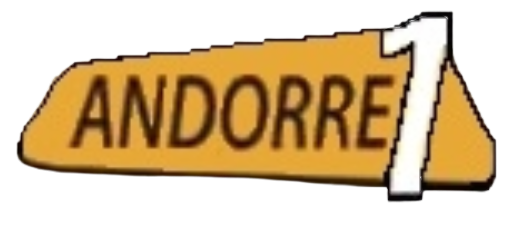
1958–1960	1960	1960	1960–1961	1961–1966	1961–1966	1966–1967	1967–1969	1969–1974

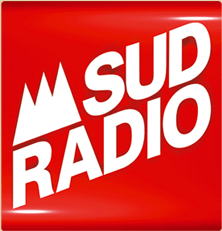
1974–1975	1975–1977	1977–1981	1981–1986	1986–1991	1991–2006	2006–2014	Since 2014

== Broadcasting area ==
Sud Radio broadcasts throughout 29 departments that are in seven historical regions, which are Aquitaine, Auvergne, Languedoc-Roussillon, Limousin, Île-de-France (since August 2011, as Sud Radio+, because the station broadcasts geographically in the South of France), Midi-Pyrénées and Provence-Alpes-Côte-d'Azur.

Among its radio columnist is a French author Robert Zuili.
