= Jazz Radio =

France
- Broadcast area: France (National Network); Monaco
- Frequencies: 97.3 MHz (Lyon); 92.8 MHz (Marseille); 95.7 MHz (Monaco)
- RDS: J_A_Z_Z_

Programming
- Language: French
- Format: Jazz

Ownership
- Owner: Espace Group
- Sister stations: Alpes 1 Générations; Là la Radio; La Radio Plus; MFM Radio; ODS Radio; Radio Espace; Radio Sun; Radio RVA; Virage Radio

History
- First air date: 10 January 1996
- Former call signs: Fréquence Jazz

Technical information
- Transmitter coordinates: 45.76°N 4.84°E

Links
- Website: jazzradio.fr

Jazz Radio (formerly Fréquence Jazz) is a French radio station dedicated to jazz and soul that started in 1996.

Jazz Radio is based in Lyon, France, and broadcasts with around 45 frequencies throughout France and Monaco.

== History ==
In January 1996 Fréquence Jazz was created by Christophe Mahé (should not be confused with the French singer Christophe Maé) in Lyon on 97.3 MHz and became the first French jazz station broadcasting around the clock.

In August 1996, a Parisian version of Fréquence Jazz was created named Paris Jazz but with different programming. The CSA allowed broadcasting in Paris by sharing broadcast time with Générations on 88.2 MHz, also owned by Espace Group. Paris Jazz broadcast between 14:00 – 19:00 and 23:00 – 07:00. Like Fréquence Jazz in Lyon, its sister station was dedicated entirely to jazz music. In 2002, after six years of activity Paris Jazz stopped broadcasting for unspecified reasons to let Générations 88.2 broadcast all day, seven days a week.

In 2006, Fréquence Jazz started broadcasting in 20 cities under the name Jazz Radio 2.

In 2008, the name Fréquence Jazz and Jazz Radio 2 were changed to become Jazz Radio. Then in June and July 2008, Jazz Radio started broadcasting on 4 new frequencies in the regions Centre and Midi-Pyrénées. In the end of 2008, Jazz Radio continues its extension of frequencies throughout France with 9 new frequencies in the North and East of France.

Since May 2012, Jazz Radio has also been available in Monaco on the 95.7 MHz frequency. In December 2012, the CSA allowed Jazz Radio to start broadcasting on their 45th frequency in Dijon on 106.3 MHz. In January 2013, the CSA allowed the Jazz Radio station to start broadcasting in Paris digitally on RNT (Radio Numérique Terrestre) (DAB+).

Jazz Radio plays mainly jazz and soul but also plays funk, blues, lounge, Latin jazz, bossa nova, groove, swing, and gospel. Jazz Radio is also available over the internet and via satellite.

== Broadcasting area ==
Jazz Radio broadcasts throughout France in frequency modulation (FM) on the following frequencies (in MHz):

- Aix-en-Provence: 96.2
- Alençon: 99.2
- Annecy: 99.0
- Apt: 107.4
- Argentan: 106.8
- Arras: 89.4
- Aurillac: 99.6
- Auxerre: 87.6
- Bagnols-sur-Cèze: 105.9
- Bastia: 88.7
- Besançon: 92.4
- Boulogne-sur-Mer: 91.1
- Bourges: 93.4
- Cahors: 103.4
- Calvi: 97.0
- Châlons-en-Champagne: 98.4
- Chamonix: 94.3
- Charleville Mézières: 89.4
- Chartres: 94.1
- Cherbourg: 104.4
- Clermont-Ferrand: 99.4
- Courchevel: 100.0
- Epernay: 88.3
- Gap: 92.4
- Ghisonaccia: 88.7
- Le Puy en Velay: 105.1
- Lisieux: 106.7
- Lyon: 97.3
- Marseille: 92.8
- Monaco: 95.7
- Montélimar: 106.6
- Narbonne: 102.3
- Nogent-le-Rotrou: 93.9
- Pamiers: 103.3
- Reims: 93.7
- Rethel: 93.8
- Roanne: 92.9
- Saint-Lô: 99.2
- Tours: 103.4
- Troyes: 94.9
- Vienne: 100.9

== Logos ==
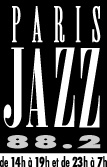
Logo of Paris Jazz from 1996 until 2002

Logo of Fréquence Jazz from 1996 until 2008

Current Jazz Radio logo since 2008
