= Groupe 1981 =

French company

- Company type: Société par actions simplifiée
- Founded: Orléans, France (1992)
- Founder: Jean-Éric Valli
- Headquarters: Orléans, France
- Area served: France
- Parent: Cap Radio
- Website: sudradiogroupe.fr

Groupe 1981 (from 1992 until 2010 Groupe Start then from 2010 until 2013 Sud Radio Groupe) is a French company established in 1992 which engages in radio publishing and is based in Orléans, France.

== History ==
In 1992, the Start Group is founded by Jean-Éric Vailli.

In 2010, the Start Group changes its name to become Sud Radio Groupe, named after the Sud Radio radio station.

On September 9, 2013, the Sud Radio Group sold the Sud Radio station to Fiducial Médias for 7 million euros.

On December 11, 2013, the group renamed itself Groupe 1981 following the sale of Sud Radio.

In January 2014, Grope 1981 announced an investment of 500,000 euros in the creation of a French-language radio station, Frissons Radio, in Cotonou, Benin, aimed at an audience over 40 years old.

On January 1, 2019, Alain Liberty, former general director of Radio Scoop in Lyon for eleven years and also the acting president of SIRTI, became the executive general director of Groupe 1981 in Paris.

== Radio stations ==
- Black Box
- Forum
- Latina
- Oüi FM
- Ado FM
- Vibration
- Voltage
- Wit FM
- Feel FM
