= Pierre Bellanger =

French businessman (born 1958)

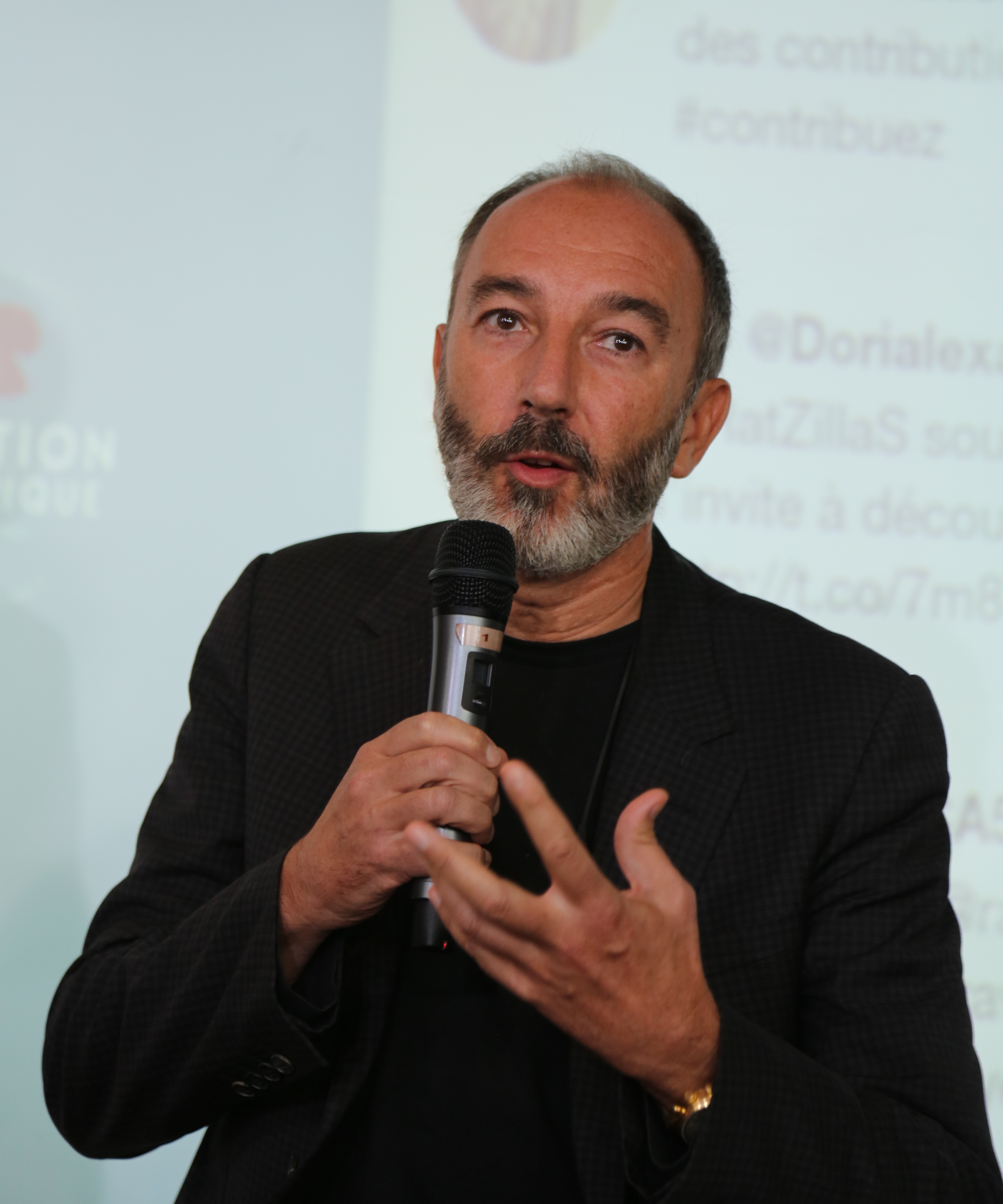
- Bellanger in 2014
- Born: 14 December 1958 (age 67)
- Occupation: businessman

Pierre Christian Bellanger (French pronunciation: [pjɛʁ kʁistjɑ̃ belɑ̃ʒe]; born 14 December 1958) is a French businessman who is founder and CEO of radio station Skyrock, and founder of Skyrock.com (French-language social network).

== Biography ==
Bellanger created Skyrock in 1985 as a national FM station in France. Today, it ranks as the country's most popular radio station among 13- to 24-year-olds, with four million listeners each day.

As a biology student in late 1970s Paris, Bellanger participated in the free radio movement that helped to topple the state's monopoly on broadcasting. Since then, as an entrepreneur in media and Internet, he has created a TV station, several radio stations, as well as numerous cable and satellite services. His interactive experience began in the mid-1980s with the Minitel and phone services. His first Internet company was created in 1994 as a joint venture with France Telecom.

Bellanger is the author of two books: The Future of Radio (1992) and La convergence, c'est le code (2003). In 2006, the French Ministry of Culture and Communication named him to the Counsel for Strategic Analysis of Cultural and Communications Industries.

In 2004, Bellanger helped to spearhead the French government's introduction of the Dispositif Alerte-Enlèvement, modeled on the North American Amber alert systems.

== Bibliography ==
- Pierre Bellanger : La radio du futur : Les sept défis de la radio commerciale en France, Armand Colin, (1992)
- Pierre Bellanger : Ils ont pensé le futur : web social, marketing, e-commerce..., KAWA
- Pierre Bellanger : La Souveraineté numérique, Éditions Stock
