= Ado FM =

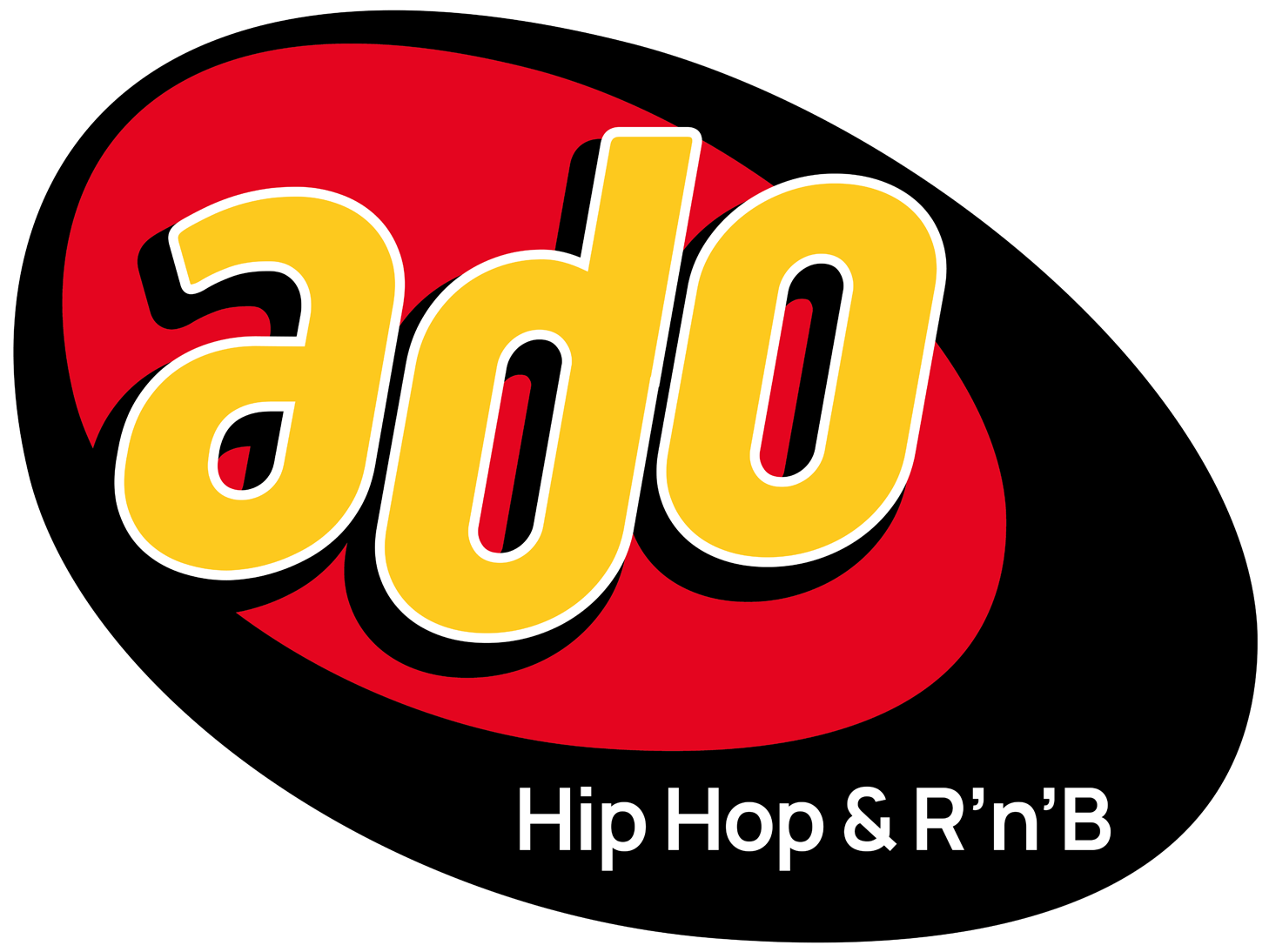
- Paris; France
- Frequencies: 97.8 MHz (Paris); 93.1 MHz (Toulouse)

Programming
- Language: French
- Format: Hip-hop; Contemporary R&B

Ownership
- Owner: Groupe 1981
- Sister stations: BlackBox

History
- First air date: 1981; 45 years ago
- Former names: Swigg (2017–2022)

Links
- Website: www.ado.fr

Ado FM is a radio station in France, broadcasting on FM to Paris and Toulouse. Created in 1981 and owned by the Groupe 1981. The station plays hip-hop music and R&B from the 1990s, 2000s, 2010s and 2020s.

== History ==
The radio was created under the name Ado FM by Isabelle Da (real name Isabelle Ciron) in 1981, as a community station.

Following the death of Isabelle Da, Ado FM was bought in 1996 by Concept Radio, a subsidiary of the Start group. This group owns Vibration. Its program director Bruno Witek transforms Ado FM into a commercial music station in hip-hop and R&B format.

Ado turned to pop and dance from 2015 to 2016.

On 29 June 2017, during a private concert, Ado FM changed its name to Swigg. According to Jean-Éric Valli, president of Groupe 1981, this new name symbolized "its return to the fundamentals of urban cultures" in order to "become the benchmark hip-hop and RnB radio station for 15-25 year olds".

In October 2017, Swigg was given formal notice by the CSA due to non-compliance, between December 2016 and February 2017, with the distribution rates of French-language songs.

In 2021, Ado FM was relaunched on digital radio. This then replaced Swigg on 22 August 2022.

== Frequencies ==
Ado FM is broadcast from the Paris–Bagnolet transmitter on 97.8 MHz (4 kW ERP) and from the Toulouse transmitter site on 93.1 MHz (2 kW ERP).

== Identity of Ado FM ==
=== Logos ===
Old logo of Ado FM from 1981 till 1997

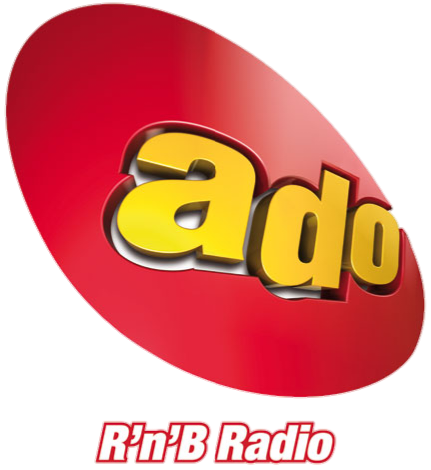
Old logo of Ado FM from 2008 till 2017

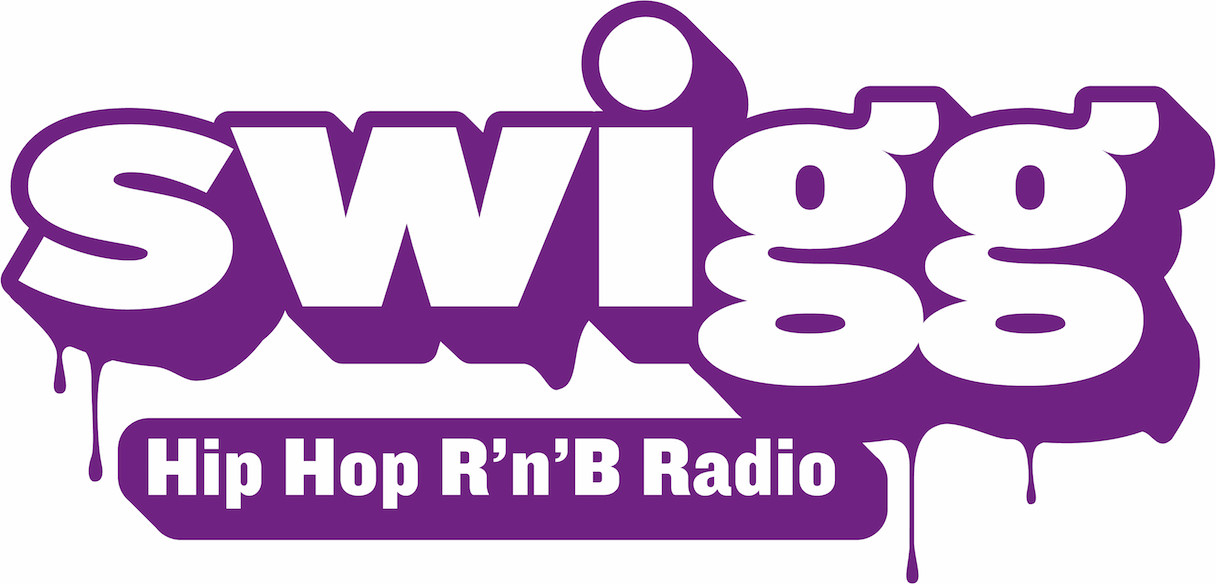
Old logo of Swigg from 2017 till 2018

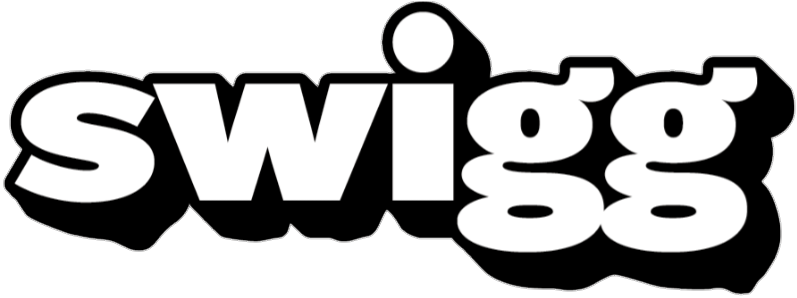
Old logo of Swigg from 2018 till 2022

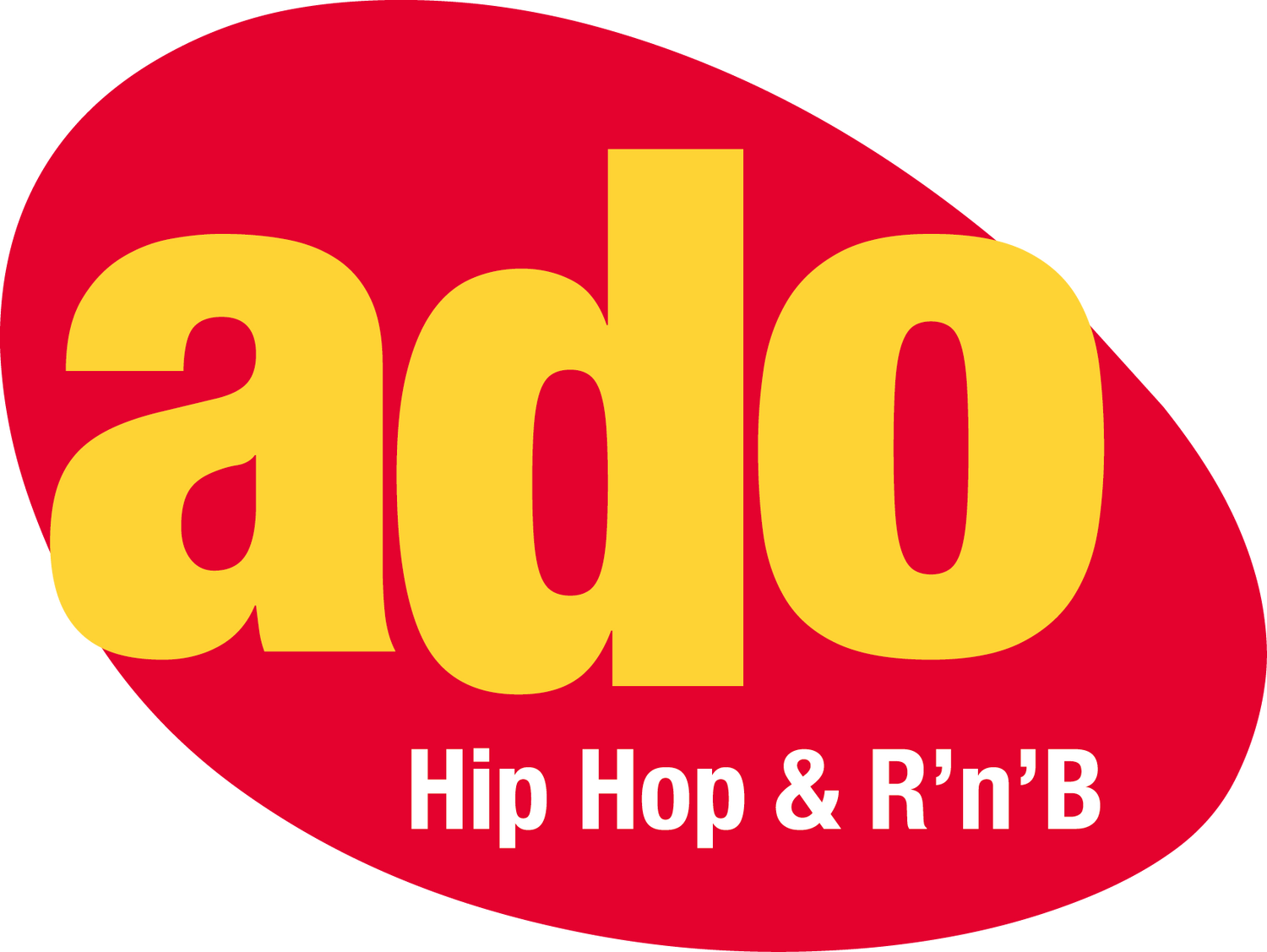
Old logo of Ado FM from 2021 till 2022

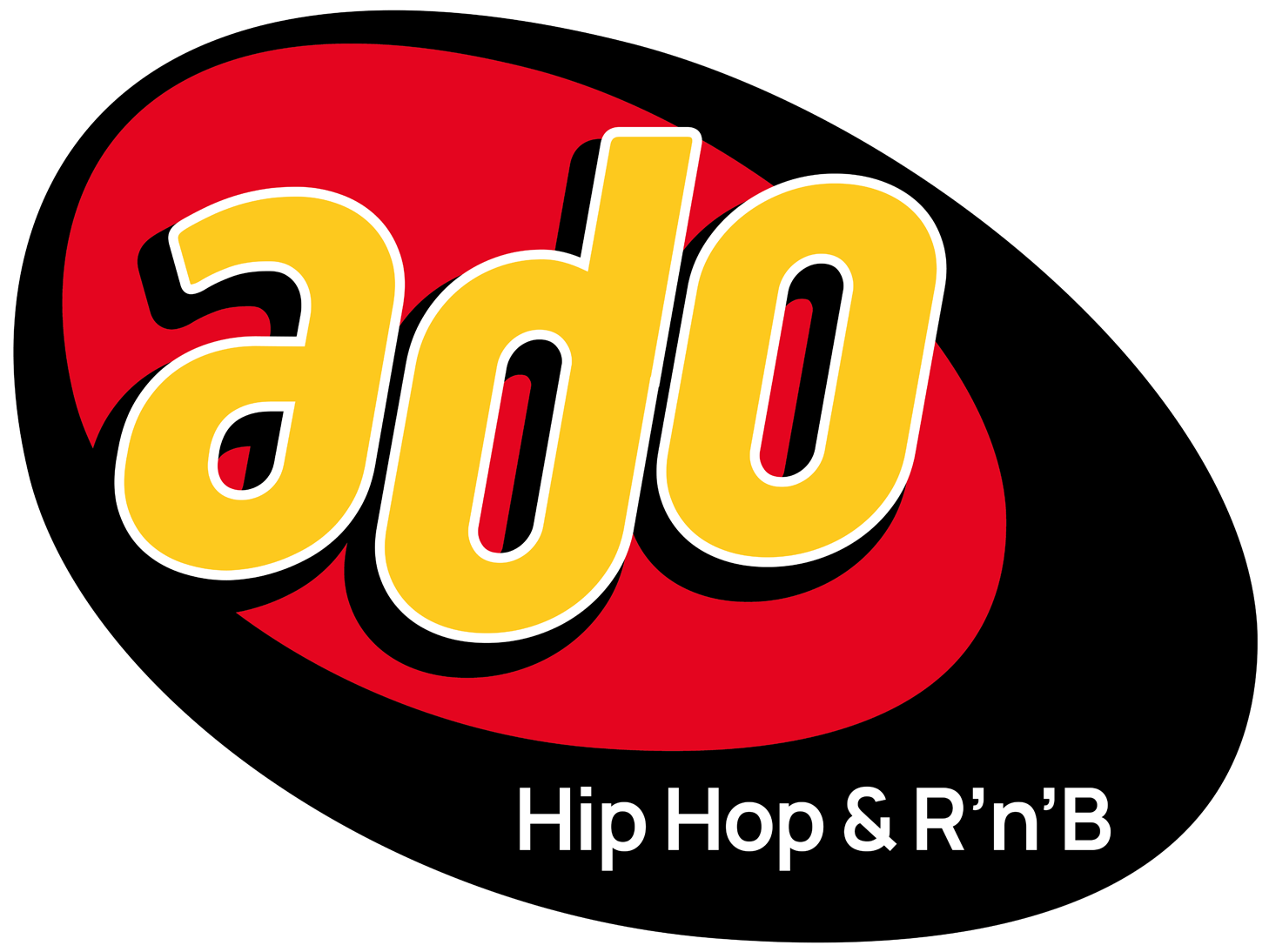
Current logo of Ado FM since 2022

=== Slogans ===
- 1981–1997: Ado, enfant j'écoute
- 1997–2000: 100% Rap n' Groove
- 2000–2007: La Radio Hip-Hop et R&B, Ado Attitude
- 2007-2008: Love & R&B
- 2008-2012: Hip-Hop & Rn'B
- 2012-2014: Le Nouveau Son Rn'B
- 2014-2015: R'n'B Radio
- 2015-2016: Mix Dance Pop R'n'B
- 2016: Mix Pop Dance R'n'B
- 2017-2018, Since 2022: Hip-Hop R'n'B Radio
- 2017: La Base Le Son La Famille, C'est La Base
- 2018-2020: La Famille Hip-Hop
- 2020–2022: La radio 100% rap français
- 2022: Classic Rap Radio
