= Espace Group =

French media company

- Type: Société anonyme
- Industry: business and other management consulting
- Founded: Lyon, France (December 24, 1987)
- Founder: Christophe Mahé
- Headquarters: Lyon, France
- Number of locations: 19 (2013)
- Key people: Christophe Mahé (President and CEO)
- Products: Radio
- Revenue: €3,352,600 (2011)
- Website: espacegroup.com

Espace Group is a French media company established in 1987, based at Lyon and which engages in mainly radio publishing.

Between 1993 and 2009, the Espace Group was allowed to broadcast the Swiss radio station Couleur 3 in France, until all French frequencies were taken over completely by Virage Radio in June 2009.

== Operations ==
=== Radio stations ===
Espace Group is currently owning and broadcasting the following stations:

- Alpes 1 (Grenoble, Gap) : since 1999
- Générations (Paris) : since 1992
- Jazz Radio (Lyon) : since 1996 (formerly Fréquence Jazz)
- Là la Radio (Briançon)
- La Radio Plus (Thonon-les-Bains) : since 1982 (formerly: Radio Thollon)
- M Radio (Lyon) : since 1981 (formerly: Radio Montmartre, Montmartre FM, MFM Radio)
- ODS Radio (Annecy) : since the 1980s
- Radio Espace (Lyon) : since 1995
- Radio RVA (Clermont-Ferrand) : since the 1990s
- Radio Sun (Lyon) : since 1993
- Virage Radio (Lyon) : since 2009; (before broadcasting: Couleur 3 between 1993 and 2009)

=== Other ===
- LyonMag.com : news and info website for the Lyon area.
