= Wit FM =

Bègles; France
- Broadcast area: France
- Frequencies: 100.8 MHz (Bordeaux); 96.6 MHz (Périgueux); Full list of frequencies on witfm.fr

Programming
- Language: French
- Format: Top 40

Ownership
- Owner: Groupe 1981

History
- First air date: 1 June 1988

Links
- Website: www.witfm.fr

Wit FM is a French local radio station, based in Bègles near Bordeaux, created in 1988 and owned by Sud Radio Groupe.

== History ==
In June 1988, Wit FM was created in Bordeaux, by Jean-Louis Marin, former journalist of RMC and a member of the Sud Radio team. Wit FM took over the defunct frequencies of the Parisian radio station Hit FM, they have chosen a similar name to that of the Hit FM station in order to keep its predecessor's listeners. Sometime later, the station was acquired by Claude Bez, president of the sports club Girondins de Bordeaux.

In 1989, Wit FM is sold for 75% to Sud Radio.

In 2006, the radio station along with Sud Radio was bought by the Orléans-based group Start, which renamed it to Sud Radio Groupe in 2010.

== Identity of WitFM ==
=== Logos ===
Logo of Wit FM from 1988 till 1990.

Logo of Wit FM from 1990 till 1999.

Logo of Wit FM from 1999 till 2006.

Current logo of Wit FM since 2006.

=== Slogans ===
- 1988–2007 : L'esprit radio !
- 2007–2008 : Hit Radio & Cash
- 2008–2022 : Bien + que des hits !
- Since 2 December 2022 : Du cœur et des hits
