= BlackBox (radio station) =

Bordeaux; France
- Frequencies: 103.7 MHz (Bordeaux); 103.6 MHz (Arcachon)
- RDS: BLACKBOX

Programming
- Language: French
- Format: Hip-hop; Contemporary R&B

Ownership
- Owner: Groupe 1981
- Sister stations: Ado FM

History
- First air date: 1991

Technical information
- Transmitter coordinates: 44°52′7″N 00°31′27″W

Links
- Website: www.blackboxfm.fr

BlackBox is a local French radio station broadcasting to Bordeaux and Arcachon, created in 1991 and owned by Groupe 1981. The station plays hip-hop music and R&B from the 1990s, 2000s, 2010s and 2020s.

== History ==
BlackBox was created in 1981 broadcasting African and urban music in the Bordeaux area for the Afro-Caribbean community. Two previous stations specializing in African and Caribbean music, Equinoxe and Caraïbes FM, had closed in the late 1980s. The station continued to have one frequency, despite multiple attempts at expansion, until the mid-2010s when its application for Arcachon was granted.

In 1998, the Orleans-based group Start (name changed to Groupe 1981 in 2013) bought BlackBox. Start provided an infusion of resources that aided BlackBox's success. and transformed it into a commercial music station in hip-hop and R&B format. The format is similar to Groupe 1981-owned Ado FM.

== Identity of BlackBox ==
=== Logos ===
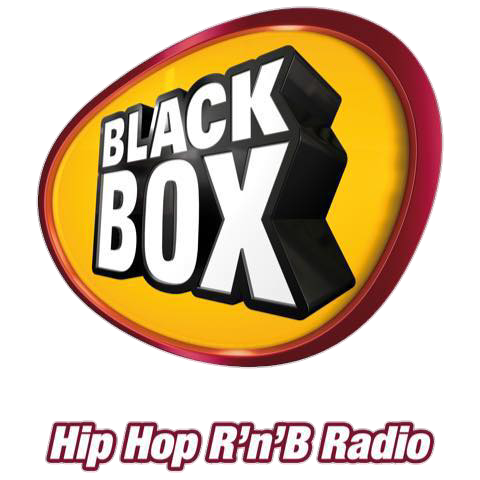
Old logo of BlackBox from 2008 till 2018

Current logo of BlackBox since 2018

=== Slogans ===
- 2000–2007: La Radio Hip-Hop et R&B
- 2007-2008: Love & R&B
- 2008-2012: Hip-Hop & Rn'B
- 2012-2014: Le Nouveau Son Rn'B
- 2014-2015: R'n'B Radio
- 2015-2016: Mix Dance Pop R'n'B
- 2016: Mix Pop Dance R'n'B
- 2017-2018, Since 2022: Hip-Hop R'n'B Radio
- 2017: La Base Le Son La Famille, C'est La Base
- 2018-2020: La Famille Hip-Hop
- 2020–2022: La radio 100% rap français
- 2022: Classic Rap Radio

== Frequencies ==
It is broadcast on 103.7 MHz from the Bordeaux–Lormont transmitter (1 kW) and 103.6 MHz from the Arcachon transmitter site (500 watts), as well as on DAB+.
