= Jean-François Bizot =

French journalist and writer (1944–2007)

Jean-François Bizot (14 August 1944 – 8 September 2007) was a French journalist and writer.

Born in Paris, Bizot was the creator of the Actuel underground publication in 1970. He was also the founder and owner of the Paris-based radio station, Radio Nova, which first broadcast in 1981. He died of cancer in Paris, aged 63.
