= Skyrock (radio station) =

Paris; France
- Broadcast area: France
- Frequencies: 96.0 MHz (Paris); 96.1 MHz (Lyon); 90.0 MHz (Marseille)
- RDS: SKYROCK_

Programming
- Language: French
- Format: Urban contemporary

Ownership
- Owner: Groupe Orbus

History
- First air date: 21 March 1986

Links
- Webcast: TuneIn
- Website: www.skyrock.fm

Skyrock is a French radio station based in Paris created in 1986, and is mainly dedicated to mainstream rap music and R&B.

== History ==
In March 1986, Skyrock was created by Pierre Bellanger.
