= Groupement d'intérêt économique =

A groupement d'intérêt économique (abbreviated GIE; in English Economic Interest Grouping or Economic Interest Group, abbreviated EIG) is a Francophone consortium of related businesses, companies, foundations, organisations or institutes which are formally pooling their efforts for competitive advantage. Most partners come from the private sector but inclusion of public sector partners is not unusual.

For example, a number of businesses in the umbrella industry located in Aurillac, France, Europe formed a GIE to better meet the challenges of competing globally. Another example is Luxinnovation GIE, the National Agency for Innovation and Research of Luxembourg. It is composed of 6 partners that come from both the private and the public sector (including three Ministries).
