= Dark Matters: Twisted But True =

- Genre: Documentary; Science fiction Horror; Drama; Paranormal
- Written by: Adam Rosenthal, Annalisa D'Innela
- Narrated by: John Noble
- Country of origin: United States
- Original language: English
- No. of seasons: 2
- No. of episodes: 19

Production
- Executive producers: Dan Gold, Jasper James
- Editor: Mark Gravil
- Camera setup: Single camera
- Running time: 40–48 minutes

Original release
- Network: Science Channel
- Release: August 31, 2011 – December 26, 2012

Related
- Weird or What?

Dark Matters: Twisted But True is a television series featured on the Science Channel. Hosted by actor John Noble of Fringe and Lord of the Rings, the show takes the viewer inside the laboratory to profile strange science and expose some of history's most bizarre experiments. This show uses narration and reenactments to portray the stories in this show. A new season of episodes, under the title Dark Matters: Extra Twisted, premiered on January 23, 2013. The episodes revisit previous stories with "deeper insight and new information."

== Episodes ==
=== Season 1 (2011) ===
No.	Title	Original release date
1	"The Philadelphia Experiment, Ape-Man Army, Zapped to Death"	August 31, 2011
2	"I Have Einstein's Brain, Unidentified Flying Nazis, Killer Thoughts"	September 7, 2011
3	"Sexy Secret Agent, Full Body Transplant, Honey I Nuked the Planet"	September 14, 2011
4	"It's Alive!, Tripping with Uncle Sam, My Hand is Killing Me"	September 21, 2011
5	"21 Grams, Missing Cosmonauts, Sound of Death"	September 28, 2011
6	"Jekyll vs Hyde, How to Make a Zombie, Radio Waves of Death"	October 5, 2011

=== Season 2 (2012) ===
No.	Title	Original release date
1	"Lindbergh: American Nazi?, Suicide Song, Living Organ Donor"	July 14, 2012
2	"Resurrection Row, Operation Brainwash, Rabid Roulette"	July 21, 2012
3	"Dr. Lobotomy, Voodoo Rx, Killed by Kindness"	July 28, 2012
4	"Amnesiac, Party Poopers, Risky Radiation"	August 4, 2012
5	"Positively Poisonous, Medusa's Heroin, Beauty and Brains"	August 11, 2012
6	"Creative Evil, Curiosity Killed Dr. Katskee, Bat Bomb"	August 18, 2012
7	"Tuskegee STD, Do You See What I See?, Cold War Cold Case"	August 25, 2012
8	"Agent Orange, Ben Franklin: Fraud Slayer?, Price of Beauty"	November 21, 2012
9	"Unabomber, Get the Lead Out, Salvation by Starvation"	November 28, 2012
10	"Human Puppets, Cadavers for Cash, Einstein's Revenge"	December 5, 2012
11	"Pavlov's Children, Alien Rain, Glow Girls"	December 12, 2012
12	"Instrument of Espionage, Stutter Study, 'Roid Rage"	December 19, 2012
13	"Magickal Jet Propulsion, Missing Link Mystery, Typhoid Mary"	December 26, 2012
