= Infrasound =

Vibrations with frequencies lower than 20 hertz

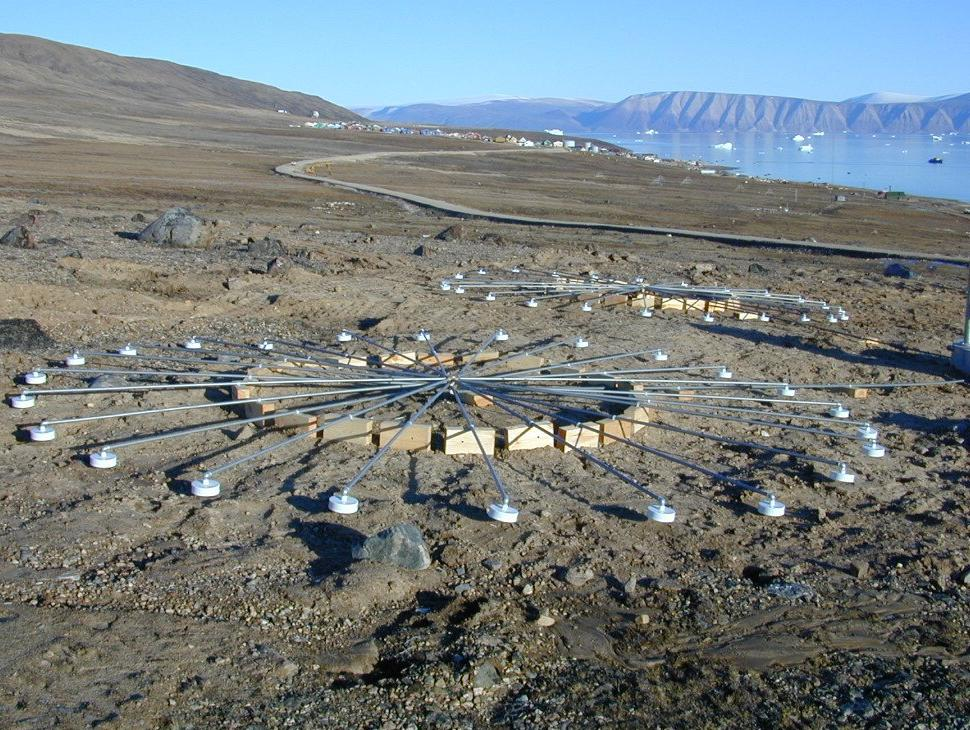
Infrasound arrays at a monitoring station in Qaanaaq, Greenland

Infrasound, sometimes referred to as low frequency sound or (sometimes ambiguously) subsonic (subsonic being a descriptor for "less than the speed of sound"), describes sound waves with a frequency below the lower limit of human audibility (generally 20 Hz, as defined by the ANSI/ASA S1.1-2013 standard). Hearing becomes gradually less sensitive as frequency decreases, so for humans to perceive infrasound, the sound pressure must be sufficiently high. Although the ear is the primary organ for sensing low sound, at higher intensities it is possible to feel infrasound vibrations in various parts of the body.

The study of such sound waves is sometimes referred to as infrasonics, covering sounds beneath 20 Hz down to 0.1 Hz (and rarely to 0.001 Hz). People use this frequency range for monitoring earthquakes and volcanoes, charting rock and petroleum formations below the earth, and also in ballistocardiography and seismocardiography to study the mechanics of the human cardiovascular system.

Infrasound is characterized by an ability to get around obstacles with little dissipation. In music, acoustic waveguide methods, such as a large pipe organ or, for reproduction, exotic loudspeaker designs such as transmission line, rotary woofer or traditional subwoofer, designs can produce low-frequency sounds, including near-infrasound. Subwoofers designed to produce infrasound are capable of sound reproduction an octave or more below that of most commercially available subwoofers, and are often about 10 times the size.

== History and study ==
One of the pioneers in infrasonic research was French scientist Vladimir Gavreau. His interest in infrasonic waves first came about in 1957 in the large concrete building that he and his research team were working in. The group was experiencing bouts of periodic and deeply unpleasant nausea. After weeks of speculation on the source of the nausea — the team was convinced that it was a pathogen or an untraced leak of noxious chemical fumes in the facility — they discovered that a "loosely poised low speed motor... was developing [these] 'nauseating vibrations'".

When Gavreau and the team attempted to measure an amplitude and pitch, they were shocked when their equipment detected no audible sound. They concluded the sound being generated by the motor was so low in pitch that it was below their biological ability to hear, and that their recording equipment was not capable of detecting these frequencies. Nobody had conceived that sound might exist at such low frequencies, and so no equipment had been developed to detect it. Eventually, it was determined that the sound inducing the nausea was a 7 cycle per second infrasound wave that was inducing a resonant mode in the ductwork and architecture of the building, significantly amplifying the sound. In the wake of this serendipitous discovery, the researchers soon got to work preparing further infrasonic tests in the laboratories. One of his experiments was an infrasonic whistle, an oversized organ pipe. As a result of this and similar incidents, it has become routine in new architecture construction to inspect for and eliminate any infrasonic resonances in cavities and the introduction of sound-proofing and materials with specialized sonic properties.

== Sources ==
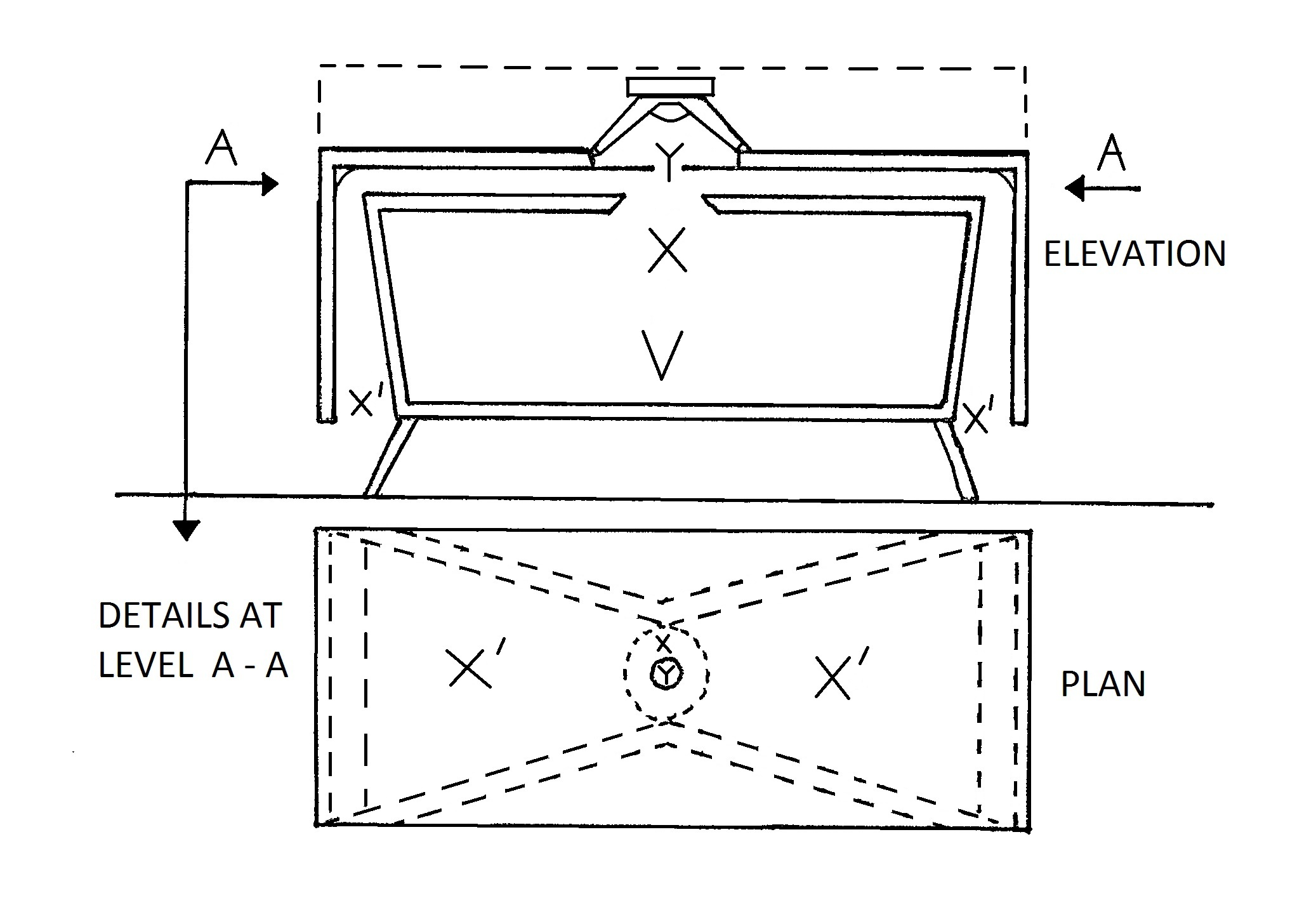
Patent for a double bass reflex loudspeaker enclosure design intended to produce infrasonic frequencies ranging from 5 to 25 hertz, of which traditional subwoofer designs are not readily capable

Infrasound can result from both natural and man-made sources:

- Natural events: infrasonic sound sometimes results naturally from severe weather, surf, lee waves, avalanches, earthquakes, volcanoes, bolides, waterfalls, calving of icebergs, aurorae, meteors, lightning and upper-atmospheric lightning. Nonlinear ocean wave interactions in ocean storms produce pervasive infrasound vibrations around 0.2 Hz, known as microbaroms. According to the Infrasonics Program at NOAA, infrasonic arrays can be used to locate avalanches in the Rocky Mountains, and to detect tornadoes on the high plains several minutes before they touch down.

- Animal communication: whales, elephants, hippopotamuses, rhinoceroses, giraffes, okapis, peacocks, and alligators are known to use infrasound to communicate over distances—up to hundreds of miles in the case of whales. In particular, the Sumatran rhinoceros has been shown to produce sounds with frequencies as low as 3 Hz which have similarities with the song of the humpback whale. The roar of the tiger contains infrasound of 18 Hz and lower, and the purr of felines is reported to cover a range of 20 to 50 Hz. It has also been suggested that migrating birds use naturally generated infrasound, from sources such as turbulent airflow over mountain ranges, as a navigational aid. Infrasound also may be used for long-distance communication, especially well documented in baleen whales, and African elephants. The frequency of baleen whale sounds can range from 10 Hz to 31 kHz, and that of elephant calls from 15 Hz to 35 Hz. Both can be extremely loud (around 117 dB), allowing communication for many kilometres, with a possible maximum range of around 10 km (6 mi) for elephants, and potentially hundreds or thousands of kilometers for some whales. Elephants also produce infrasound waves that travel through solid ground and are sensed by other herds using their feet, although they may be separated by hundreds of kilometres. These calls may be used to coordinate the movement of herds and allow mating elephants to find each other.

- Human singers: some vocalists, including Tim Storms, can produce notes in the infrasound range.

- Man-made sources: infrasound can be generated by human processes such as sonic booms and explosions (both chemical and nuclear), or by machinery such as diesel engines, wind turbines and specially designed mechanical transducers (industrial vibration tables). Certain specialized loudspeaker designs are also able to reproduce extremely low frequencies; these include large-scale rotary woofer models of subwoofer loudspeaker, as well as large horn loaded, bass reflex, sealed and transmission line loudspeakers.

== Animal reaction ==
Some animals have been thought to perceive the infrasonic waves going through the earth, caused by natural disasters, and to use these as an early warning. An example of this is the 2004 Indian Ocean earthquake and tsunami. Animals were reported to have fled the area hours before the actual tsunami hit the shores of Asia. It is not known for sure that this is the cause; some have suggested that it may have been the influence of electromagnetic waves, and not of infrasonic waves, that prompted these animals to flee.

Research in 2013 by Jon Hagstrum of the US Geological Survey suggests that homing pigeons use low-frequency infrasound to navigate.

== Human reactions ==
20 Hz is considered the normal low-frequency limit of human hearing. When pure sine waves are reproduced under ideal conditions and at very high volume, a human listener will be able to identify tones as low as 12 Hz. Below 10 Hz it is possible to perceive the single cycles of the sound, along with a sensation of pressure at the eardrums.

From about 1,000 Hz, the dynamic range of the auditory system decreases with decreasing frequency. This compression is observable in the equal-loudness-level contours, and it implies that even a slight increase in level can change the perceived loudness from barely audible to loud. Combined with the natural spread in thresholds within a population, its effect may be that a very low-frequency sound which is inaudible to some people may be loud to others.

One study has suggested that infrasound may cause feelings of awe or fear in humans. It has also been suggested that since it is not consciously perceived, it may make people feel vaguely that odd or supernatural events are taking place.

A scientist working at Sydney University's Auditory Neuroscience Laboratory reports growing evidence that infrasound may affect some people's nervous system by stimulating the vestibular system, and this has shown in animal models an effect similar to sea sickness.

In research conducted in 2006 focusing on the impact of sound emissions from wind turbines on the nearby population, perceived infrasound has been associated to effects such as annoyance or fatigue, depending on its intensity, with little evidence supporting physiological effects of infrasound below the human perception threshold. Later studies, however, have linked inaudible infrasound to effects such as fullness, pressure or tinnitus, and acknowledged the possibility that it could disturb sleep. Other studies have also suggested associations between noise levels in turbines and self-reported sleep disturbances in the nearby population, while adding that the contribution of infrasound to this effect is still not fully understood.

In a study at Ibaraki University in Japan, researchers said EEG tests showed that the infrasound produced by wind turbines was "considered to be an annoyance to the technicians who work close to a modern large-scale wind turbine".

Jürgen Altmann of the Technical University of Dortmund, an expert on sonic weapons, has said that there is no reliable evidence for nausea and vomiting caused by infrasound.

High volume levels at concerts from subwoofer arrays have been cited as causing lung collapse in individuals who are very close to the subwoofers, especially for smokers who are particularly tall and thin.

In September 2009, London student Tom Reid died in a club of sudden arrhythmic death syndrome (SADS) after complaining that "loud bass notes" from the club's speakers were "getting to his heart". The inquest recorded a verdict of natural causes, although some experts commented that the bass could have acted as a trigger.

Air is a very inefficient medium for transferring low frequency vibration from a transducer to the human body. Mechanical connection of the vibration source to the human body, however, provides a potentially dangerous combination. The U.S. space program, worried about the harmful effects of rocket flight on astronauts, ordered vibration tests that used cockpit seats mounted on vibration tables to transfer "brown note" and other frequencies directly to the human subjects. Very high power levels of 160 dB were achieved at frequencies of 2–3 Hz. Test frequencies ranged from 0.5 Hz to 40 Hz. Test subjects suffered motor ataxia, nausea, visual disturbance, degraded task performance and difficulties in communication. These tests are assumed by researchers to be the nucleus of the current urban myth surrounding the "brown note" and its effects.

The report "A Review of Published Research on Low Frequency Noise and its Effects" contains a long list of research about exposure to high-level infrasound among humans and animals. For instance, in 1972, Borredon exposed 42 young men to tones at 7.5 Hz at 130 dB for 50 minutes. This exposure caused no adverse effects other than reported drowsiness and a slight blood pressure increase. In 1975, Slarve and Johnson exposed four male subjects to infrasound at frequencies from 1 to 20 Hz, for eight minutes at a time, at levels up to 144 dB SPL. There was no evidence of any detrimental effect other than mild ear discomfort. Tests of high-intensity infrasound on animals resulted in measurable changes, such as cell changes and ruptured blood vessel walls.

Infrasound is one hypothesized cause of death for the nine Soviet hikers who were found dead at Dyatlov Pass in 1959.

=== Hygienic standards in the workplace ===
US: Maximum levels for frequencies from 1 to 80 Hz are no more than 145 dB. Overall level (for all frequencies) is no more than 150 dB.

RF
Equivalent sound pressure levels, dB, in octave bands with geometric mean frequencies, Hz				Equivalent overall sound pressure level, dB	Maximum overall infrasound level, dB
2	4	8	16	Equivalent overall sound pressure level, dB	Maximum overall infrasound level, dB
100	95	90	85	100	120

=== Brown note ===
The brown note is a hypothetical infrasonic frequency capable of causing fecal incontinence by creating acoustic resonance in the human bowel. Attempts to demonstrate the existence of a "brown note" using sound waves transmitted through the air have failed.

In February 2005 the television show MythBusters attempted to verify whether the "brown note" was a reality. They tested notes down to 5 Hz in frequency and up to 153 dB in sound pressure. They used a type of subwoofer used for major rock concerts, and which had been specially modified for deeper bass extension. The rumored physiological effects did not materialize. The show declared the brown note myth "busted."

=== Infrasonic 17 Hz tone experiment ===
On 31 May 2003, a group of UK researchers held a mass experiment, where they exposed some 700 people to music laced with soft 17 Hz sine waves played at a level described as "near the edge of hearing", produced by an extra-long-stroke subwoofer mounted two-thirds of the way from the end of a seven-meter-long plastic sewer pipe. The experimental concert (entitled Infrasonic) took place in the Purcell Room—‌a concert and performance venue which is part of Central London's Southbank Centre—‌over the course of two performances, each consisting of four musical pieces. Two of the pieces in each concert had 17 Hz tones played underneath.

In the second concert, the pieces that were to carry a 17 Hz undertone were swapped so that test results would not focus on any specific musical piece. The participants were not told which pieces included the low-level 17 Hz near-infrasonic tone. The presence of the tone resulted in a significant number (22%) of respondents reporting feeling uneasy or sorrowful, getting chills down the spine or nervous feelings of revulsion or fear.

In presenting the evidence to the British Association for the Advancement of Science, Professor Richard Wiseman said "These results suggest that low frequency sound can cause people to have unusual experiences even though they cannot consciously detect infrasound. Some scientists have suggested that this level of sound may be present at some allegedly haunted sites and so cause people to have odd sensations that they attribute to a ghost—our findings support these ideas."

=== Suggested relationship to ghost sightings ===
Psychologist Richard Wiseman of the University of Hertfordshire suggests that the odd sensations that people attribute to ghosts may be caused by infrasonic vibrations. Vic Tandy, experimental officer and part-time lecturer in the school of international studies and law at Coventry University, along with Dr. Tony Lawrence of the University's psychology department, wrote in 1998 a paper called "Ghosts in the Machine" for the Journal of the Society for Psychical Research. Their research suggested that an infrasonic signal of 19 Hz might be responsible for some ghost sightings. Tandy was working late one night alone in a supposedly haunted laboratory at Warwick, when he felt very anxious and could detect a grey blob out of the corner of his eye. When Tandy turned to face the grey blob, there was nothing.

The following day, Tandy was working on his fencing foil, with the handle held in a vice. Although there was nothing touching it, the blade started to vibrate wildly. Further investigation led Tandy to discover that the extractor fan in the lab was emitting a frequency of 18.98 Hz, very close to the resonant frequency of the eye given as 18 Hz by NASA. This, Tandy conjectured, was why he had seen a ghostly figure—it was, he believed, an optical illusion caused by his eyeballs resonating. The room was exactly half a wavelength in length, and the desk was in the centre, thus causing a standing wave which caused the vibration of the foil.

Tandy investigated this phenomenon further and wrote a paper entitled The Ghost in the Machine. He carried out a number of investigations at various sites believed to be haunted, including the basement of the Tourist Information Bureau next to Coventry Cathedral and Edinburgh Castle.

== Detection and measurement ==
NASA Langley has designed and developed an infrasonic detection system that can be used to make useful infrasound measurements at a location where it was not possible previously. The system comprises an electret condenser microphone PCB Model 377M06, having a 3-inch membrane diameter, and a small, compact windscreen. Electret-based technology offers the lowest possible background noise, because Johnson noise generated in the supporting electronics (preamplifier) is minimized.

The microphone features a high membrane compliance with a large backchamber volume, a prepolarized backplane and a high impedance preamplifier located inside the backchamber. The windscreen, based on the high transmission coefficient of infrasound through matter, is made of a material having a low acoustic impedance and has a sufficiently thick wall to ensure structural stability. Close-cell polyurethane foam has been found to serve the purpose well. In the proposed test, test parameters will be sensitivity, background noise, signal fidelity (harmonic distortion), and temporal stability.

The microphone design differs from that of a conventional audio system in that the peculiar features of infrasound are taken into account. First, infrasound propagates over vast distances through the Earth's atmosphere as a result of very low atmospheric absorption and of refractive ducting that enables propagation by way of multiple bounces between the Earth's surface and the stratosphere. A second property that has received little attention is the great penetration capability of infrasound through solid matter – a property utilized in the design and fabrication of the system windscreens.

Thus the system fulfills several instrumentation requirements advantageous to the application of acoustics: (1) a low-frequency microphone with especially low background noise, which enables detection of low-level signals within a low-frequency passband; (2) a small, compact windscreen that permits (3) rapid deployment of a microphone array in the field. The system also features a data acquisition system that permits real time detection, bearing, and signature of a low-frequency source.

=== Infrasound for nuclear detonation detection ===
Infrasound is one of several techniques used to identify if a nuclear detonation has occurred. A network of 53 infrasound stations, in addition to seismic and hydroacoustic stations, comprise the International Monitoring System (IMS) that is tasked with monitoring compliance with the Comprehensive Nuclear Test-Ban Treaty (CTBT). IMS Infrasound stations consist of eight microbarometer sensors and space filters arranged in an array covering an area of approximately 1 to 9 km^{2}. The space filters used are radiating pipes with inlet ports along their length, designed to average out pressure variations like wind turbulence for more precise measurements. The microbarometers used are designed to monitor frequencies below approximately 20 hertz. Sound waves below 20 hertz have longer wavelengths and are not easily absorbed, allowing for detection across large distances.

Infrasound wavelengths can be generated artificially through detonations and other human activity, or naturally from earthquakes, severe weather, lightning, and other sources. Like forensic seismology, algorithms and other filter techniques are required to analyze gathered data and characterize events to determine if a nuclear detonation has actually occurred. Data is transmitted from each station via secure communication links for further analysis. A digital signature is also embedded in the data sent from each station to verify if the data is authentic.

The Comprehensive Nuclear-Test-Ban Treaty Organization Preparatory Commission uses infrasound as one of its monitoring technologies, along with seismic, hydroacoustic, and atmospheric radionuclide monitoring. The loudest infrasound recorded by the monitoring system to date was generated by the 2013 Chelyabinsk meteor, which was detected by 20 of the system's stations. The commission reports the scale of the infrasound was "dwarfed" by the 2022 Hunga Tonga–Hunga Haʻapai eruption, detected by all 53 stations.

== In popular culture ==
The 2017 film The Sound uses infrasound as a major plot element.

In "Fermata", a 2020 episode of the Franco-Belgian TV series Astrid et Raphaëlle, infrasound from a generator hidden in the pipe organ of the Grand Auditorium in the Maison de la Radio et de la Musique, the Paris headquarters of Radio France, is used as a murder weapon.

The 'ghost frequency' phenomenon is mentioned in Season 3 Episode 4 of the TV Series Evil, The Demon of the Road as well as Season 23 Episode 3 of the TV series NCIS, The Sound and the Fury.

== See also ==
- Bioacoustics
- Blaster beam
- Brown note
- Clear-air turbulence
- Contrabass tuba
- Havana syndrome
- Helmholtz resonance
- The Hum
- Low-frequency oscillation
- Microbarom
- Sonic weapon
- Subcontrabass tuba
- Ultrasound
