= Isabelle Poulenard =

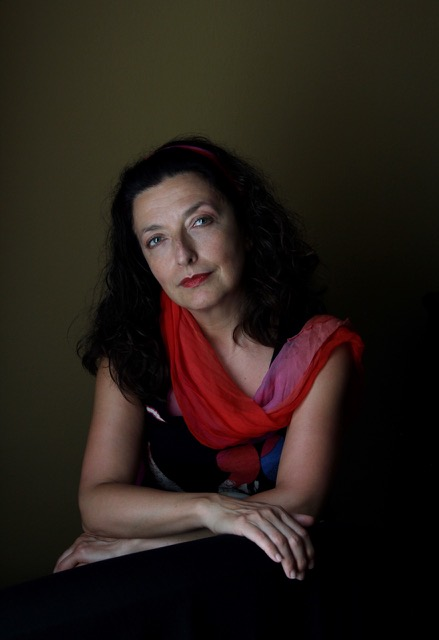
Isabelle Poulenard (2021)

Isabelle Poulenard (5 July 1961, Paris) is a French operatic soprano who made her debut in 1981 under the conductor Jean-Claude Malgoire at the Atelier lyrique in Tourcoing in northeastern France. Her repertoire extends from Baroque and classical opera to contemporary works.

== Early life and education ==
Born in Paris on 5 July 1961, Isabelle Poulenard first spent seven years at the Maîtrise de Radio France choir school before completing her study of music after three seasons at the École d'Art lyrique attached to the Paris Opera. Poulenard is also a qualified secondary school teacher, holding the Certificat d'aptitude.

== Career ==
Poulenard made her debut in 1981 at the Atelier lyrique in Tourcoing under the conductor Jean-Claude Malgloire as Lisette in Giovanni Paisiello's comic opera Il re Teodoro in Venezia. She continued to perform in Tourcoing, specializing in operas from the 17th and 18th centuries. Her many varied roles have included Despina in Mozart's Così fan tutte and the Queen of the Night in his The Magic Flute. She played the title role in Jean-Philippe Rameau's Zéphire. Frequently specializing in Baroque music, she has worked with conductors including William Christie, Sigiswald Kuijken and Mstislav Rostropovich. She was complimented by the critic John-Pierre Joyce for her contributions to the album Le Salon de Musique de Marie-Antoinette, especially Marie-Antoinette's own work "C'est mon ami".

In 1995, she created "Il Divertimento", an ensemble bringing together Claire Giardelli, Yasuko Bouvard, Laurent Steward and Nathalie Sternberg.

== Awards ==
In 2003, Poulenard was honoured by Minister of Culture Jean-Jacques Aillagon with the Ordre des Arts et des Lettres.
