= Orchestre National de France =

French symphony orchestra based in Paris

- Orchestra
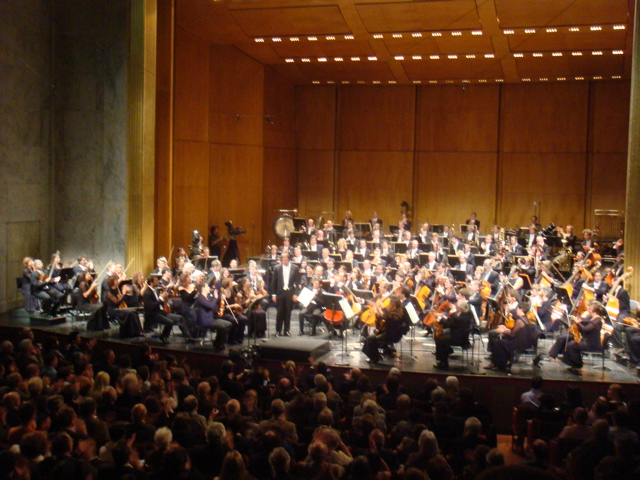
- Short name: ONF
- Founded: 1934; 92 years ago
- Location: Paris, France
- Concert hall: Auditorium de Radio France
- Principal conductor: Cristian Măcelaru
- Website: www.maisondelaradio.fr/concerts-classiques/orchestre-national-de-france

The Orchestre National de France (French pronunciation: [ɔʁkɛstʁ nɑsjɔnal də fʁɑ̃s]; transl. National Orchestra of France; abbr. ONF) is a French symphony orchestra based in Paris, founded in 1934. Placed under the administration of the French national radio (named Radio France since 1975), the ONF performs mainly in the Grand Auditorium at the Maison de la Radio et de la Musique (formerly known as Maison de la Radio) from where all its concerts are broadcast. Some concerts are also held in the Théâtre des Champs-Élysées, which was the previous main venue of the orchestra before the Auditorium was built.

== History ==
The orchestra has had the following names over its history:

- 1934–1945: Orchestre national (National Orchestra)
- 1945–1949: Orchestre national de la Radiodiffusion française (French Radio National Orchestra)
- 1949–1964: Orchestre national de la Radio-télévision française or Orchestre national de la RTF (French Radio and Television National Orchestra)
- 1964–1974: Orchestre national de l'Office de radiodiffusion-télévision française or Orchestre national de l'ORTF (National Orchestra of the French Radio and Television Office)
- 1975–present: Orchestre national de France

The orchestra was founded as the Orchestre national by decree on 18 February 1934, by the French minister of Posts Jean Mistler, as an ensemble of 80 musicians, with Désiré-Emile Inghelbrecht as musical director. The orchestra musicians were under exclusive engagements, prohibiting them to play with other orchestras such as the orchestra of the Paris Opera. Their first concert occurred at the Conservatoire de Paris on 13 March 1934. The main conductors in the orchestra's early years were Inghelbrecht, Roger Désormière and Eugène Bigot, as well as Inghelrecht's assistant conductor at the time, Manuel Rosenthal.

In 1939, half of the musicians were mobilized in the French army. The other half of the orchestra settled in Rennes between 26 October 1939 and 16 June 1940, when bombings on the city forced the orchestra to be disbanded. The Vichy government then recreated the orchestra in March 1941. The orchestra was based in Marseille, without Jewish musicians, who were excluded (among them Clara Haskil's sister, the violinist Jeanne Haskil). The orchestra returned to Paris on 1 March 1943. Since 1944, the orchestra has been based in the Théâtre des Champs-Élysées in Paris, where it occasionally plays in the pit for opera productions.

After the Liberation of France, after examination of his role under the occupation, Inghelbrecht was replaced by Manuel Rosenthal as principal conductor. The orchestra was reorganized and placed under the responsibility of the national radio, the Radiodiffusion Nationale, which became Radiodiffusion Française on 23 March 1945. Further modifications to the French national radio organisation name were Radiodiffusion-Télévision Française (RTF) on 9 February 1949, then Office de radiodiffusion-télévision française on 27 June 1964, and finally Radio France on 1 January 1975. The name of the orchestra was progressively modified in accordance with these changes in organization.

Rosenthal reinstated contemporary and French music banned under the German occupation on orchestra programmes. The orchestra also started to serve as a cultural ambassador for France, with tours in Berlin and London in 1946 and in North America in 1948, the last with Charles Munch as conductor. The first official recordings of the orchestra, with conductor Paul Kletzki, appeared in 1947 (Pictures at an Exhibition by Modest Mussorgsky, in the arrangement by Ravel, and the Boléro by the latter). In contemporary music, the orchestra premiered Pierre Boulez' Le Soleil des eaux in 1950 (with the French premiere of Béla Bartók Divertimento in the same concert), and a few days later the first European performance of Messiaen's Turangalîla-Symphonie, in Aix-en-Provence. The orchestra premiered Henri Dutilleux's Symphony No 1 in 1951. Other major pieces were played for the first time in France by the Orchestre national, and among them Wozzeck by Alban Berg (under Jascha Horenstein), and several of Anton Bruckner's and Gustav Mahler's symphonies.

In 1952, then-principal conductor Roger Désormière suffered a stroke that left him paralyzed, and was forced to retire. The orchestra did not have a principal conductor for the next 8 years, but regular guest conductors included André Cluytens. Cluytens was noted for his performances of the German repertoire with the orchestra, and led it during tours in the USSR (1959), at the Salzburg Festival (1959) and in the Middle East (1960). Other work in contemporary music included the 2 December 1954 premiere of Déserts by Edgar Varèse, under the direction of Hermann Scherchen. During the 1950s, the orchestra also recorded numerous compositions by Heitor Villa-Lobos under his direction, for EMI.

Maurice Le Roux became music director in 1960, the first conductor to hold that title with the orchestra. The Maison de la Radio was opened during this time, but the orchestra continued to perform in the Théâtre des Champs-Élysées. In the context of competition with the newly founded Orchestre de Paris in 1967, Jean Martinon became music director of the Orchestre national in 1968. His commercial recordings with the orchestra included the complete orchestral works by Claude Debussy, and the symphonies by Camille Saint-Saëns. In 1973, Sergiu Celibidache was recruited as premier chef invité (principal guest conductor), but he ended his contract in 1975, as a result of a conflict with some of the musicians.

In January 1975, the creation of Radio France led to the renaming of the ensemble as the Orchestre National de France, the title the ensemble holds today. An additional new permanent orchestra, the Orchestre Philharmonique de Radio France, was also created in 1976, by merging several smaller ensembles. This allowed the Orchestre National de France to concentrate on obtaining international prestige, without a music director, but with noted guest conductors such as Leonard Bernstein, Wolfgang Sawallisch and Seiji Ozawa. In 1977, Lorin Maazel became principal guest conductor (premier chef invité), and he officially became music director in 1988, holding the title until 1991.

Charles Dutoit became the ONF's music director in 1991. Kurt Masur succeeded Dutoit as ONF music director, from 2002 to 2008. Masur conducted the ONF's debut appearance at The Proms in August 2006. Daniele Gatti was music director from 2008 to 2016. In June 2016, Radio France announced the appointment of Emmanuel Krivine as the ONF's next music director, effective with the 2017–2018 season, with an initial contract of 3 years. He held the title of music director-designate (directeur musical désigné) for the 2016–2017 season. Krivine had been scheduled to stand down as ONF music director at the close of the 2020-2021 season. However, in May 2020, Krivine resigned from his ONF post with immediate effect, one year ahead of his originally scheduled departure.

In September 2018, Cristian Măcelaru first guest-conducted the ONF, and returned for a second guest-conducting appearance in the summer of 2019. On the basis of these appearances, in November 2019, the ONF announced the appointment of Măcelaru as its next music director, effective 1 September 2021, with an initial contract of 4 years. Following the early resignation of Krivine, Măcelaru became music director of the ONF on 1 September 2020, one year earlier than originally scheduled. In September 2022, the ONF announced an extension to Măcelaru's contract as music director through 2027. Măcelaru is scheduled to conclude his tenure with the ONF at the close of the 2026-2027 season.

In October 2022, Philippe Jordan first guest-conducted the ONF. He returned to the ONF for an additional guest-conducting engagement in October 2023. In November 2024, the ONF announced the appointment of Jordan as its next music director, effective with the 2027-2028 season. In June 2026, the ONF announced the appointment of Riccardo Muti, who had first guest-conducted the ONF in March 1980, as its new chef émérite (conductor emeritus), with immediate effect.

In addition to commercial recordings for EMI Records during the years 1960–1980, in the French repertoire, other recordings from the orchestra have been issued by Radio France itself, associated with Naïve Records.

== Principal conductors and music directors ==
- Désiré-Emile Inghelbrecht (1934–1944, principal conductor)
- Manuel Rosenthal (1944–1947, principal conductor)
- Roger Désormière (1947–1952, principal conductor)
- Maurice Le Roux (1960–1967, music director)
- Jean Martinon (1968–1973, music director)
- Alain Bancquart (1975–1976, music director)
- Lorin Maazel (1988–1990, music director)
- Charles Dutoit (1991–2001, music director)
- Kurt Masur (2002–2008, music director)
- Daniele Gatti (2008–2016, music director)
- Emmanuel Krivine (2017–2020, music director)
- Cristian Măcelaru (2020–present, music director)

== Principal guest conductors ==
- Sergiu Celibidache (1973–1975)
- Lorin Maazel (1977–1988)
- Jeffrey Tate (1989–1998)
