= Maîtrise de Radio France =

Choir school of Radio France

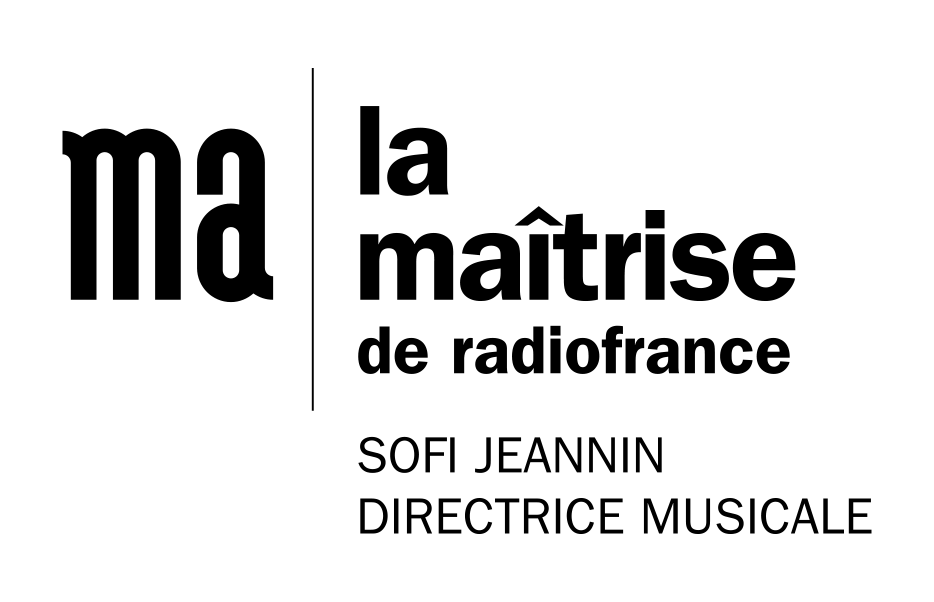
- Formation: 1946
- Founders: Henry Barraud; Maurice David
- Purpose: Choir school; Children and youth choir
- Location: Paris, France
- Director: Sofi Jeannin
- Parent organization: Radio France

Maîtrise de Radio France (French pronunciation: [mɛtʁiz də ʁadjo fʁɑ̃s]; known as Maîtrise de Radiodiffusion-Télévision Française prior to 1975) is the choir school of Radio France. The school and its choir were founded in 1946 by the composer Henry Barraud and the pedagogue Maurice David. Its first Director was Marcel Couraud. As a performing ensemble the Maîtrise choir has appeared on numerous recordings and in live concert performances, with a particular emphasis on choral works by French composers. It is one of the four permanent ensembles of Radio France along with the Orchestre philharmonique de Radio France, Orchestre national de France and Chœur de Radio France.

The school's administration is based at the Maison de la Radio et de la Musique in the 16th arrondissement of Paris, while its academic base is the nearby Lycée La Fontaine. A second site was opened in Bondy in 2007 to serve children and young people resident in the north-eastern suburbs of Paris. Sofi Jeannin has served as the director of both the school and its choir since 2008.

== Education system ==
The Maîtrise has approximately 180 students ranging in age from 7 to 17 who are accepted by a national audition process. Once accepted their education is free. The mornings are devoted to academic studies, with the school providing education from école élémentaire through the baccalauréat. The afternoons are devoted to music studies with training in both solo and choral singing, piano, harmony, Dalcroze Eurhythmics, and Alexander Technique as well as rehearsals.

The branch in Bondy, a designated sensitive urban zone of Paris with a large immigrant population, is based at the École Olympe-de-Gouges and runs a preparatory course for the main school in central Paris. The Bondy branch was established in 2007 and by 2011 had sixty students from nineteen different nationalities. The Auditorium Angèle et Roger Tribouilloy, purpose-built by the commune of Bondy in 2013, provides practice rooms and a 220-seat auditorium which the Maîtrise shares with the Commune of Bondy Conservatory and two other local collèges.

== Choir ==
In its early days, the Maîtrise was primarily a girls' choir. With the growth in the number of students over the years, and the increasing enrollment of boys who now make up a third of its students, the Maîtrise is now divided into several choral groups. These include two choirs for older girls and one for younger girls, a mixed chamber choir, and a choir for young boys whose voices have not yet changed.

The choir's first public concert took place on 6 June 1946 at the Théâtre des Champs-Élysées where they performed Michael Haydn's Missa Sancti Leopoldi, Janequin's Chant des oiseaux, and extracts from Pierné's Les Enfants à Bethléem. The Maîtrise now gives approximately forty public performances each year, either a capella or with the Radio France orchestras. They have also performed with other orchestras such as the Los Angeles Philharmonic (Mahler's Symphony No. 3, 2016) and the London Symphony Orchestra (El Niño, 2016).

== Recordings and awards ==
The choir appears on several recordings of Olivier Messiaen's Trois petites liturgies de la présence divine, including the 1994 recording for Erato conducted by Kent Nagano with Yvonne Loriod as the pianist and Jeanne Loriod playing the ondes Martenot. Messiaen had a special affection for the Maîtrise girls' choir:

I have a great admiration for the delightful voices of the Maîtrise de Radio France. These young girls have a pure sound and an absolutely unmatched musicality [...] Whenever my Trois petites liturgies de la présence divine are performed in Paris or the French provinces, I have appealed to the Maîtrise for the choral parts which this work entails. And every time, it was an enchantment of youth and joy.

The Maîtrise choir has performed on numerous recordings of operas which call for a children's chorus such as Jeanne d'Arc au bûcher, L'Enfant et les sortilèges, La bohème, and Carmen. The soundtrack of the 1984 filmed version of Carmen with Julia Migenes-Johnson, Plácido Domingo, the Choeur de Radio France, Maîtrise de Radio France, and the Orchestre National de France conducted by Lorin Maazel won the 27th annual Grammy Award for Best Opera Recording.

In 1994 the Maîtrise de Radio France performed the world premiere of Nguyen Thien Dao's opera-oratorio Les Enfants d'Izieu (The Children of Izieu) at the Festival d'Avignon. The subsequent recording received the 1995 Orphée d'or from the Académie du Disque Lyrique. It was the first time the award had been given to a children's choir.

== Past students ==
- Norah Amsellem, opera singer
- Nora Gubisch, opera singer
- Lucie Lebrun and Elisa Paris of the vocal trio L.E.J
- Danielle Licari, multi-genre chorister and soloist.
- Sandrine Piau, opera singer
- Isabelle Poulenard, opera singer
- Josephine Stephenson, composer
- Héloïse Werner, soprano, cellist and composer

== See also ==
- La Famille Bélier
