= Maison de la Radio et de la Musique =

Paris headquarters of Radio France

Coordinates: 48.8526°N 2.2782°E

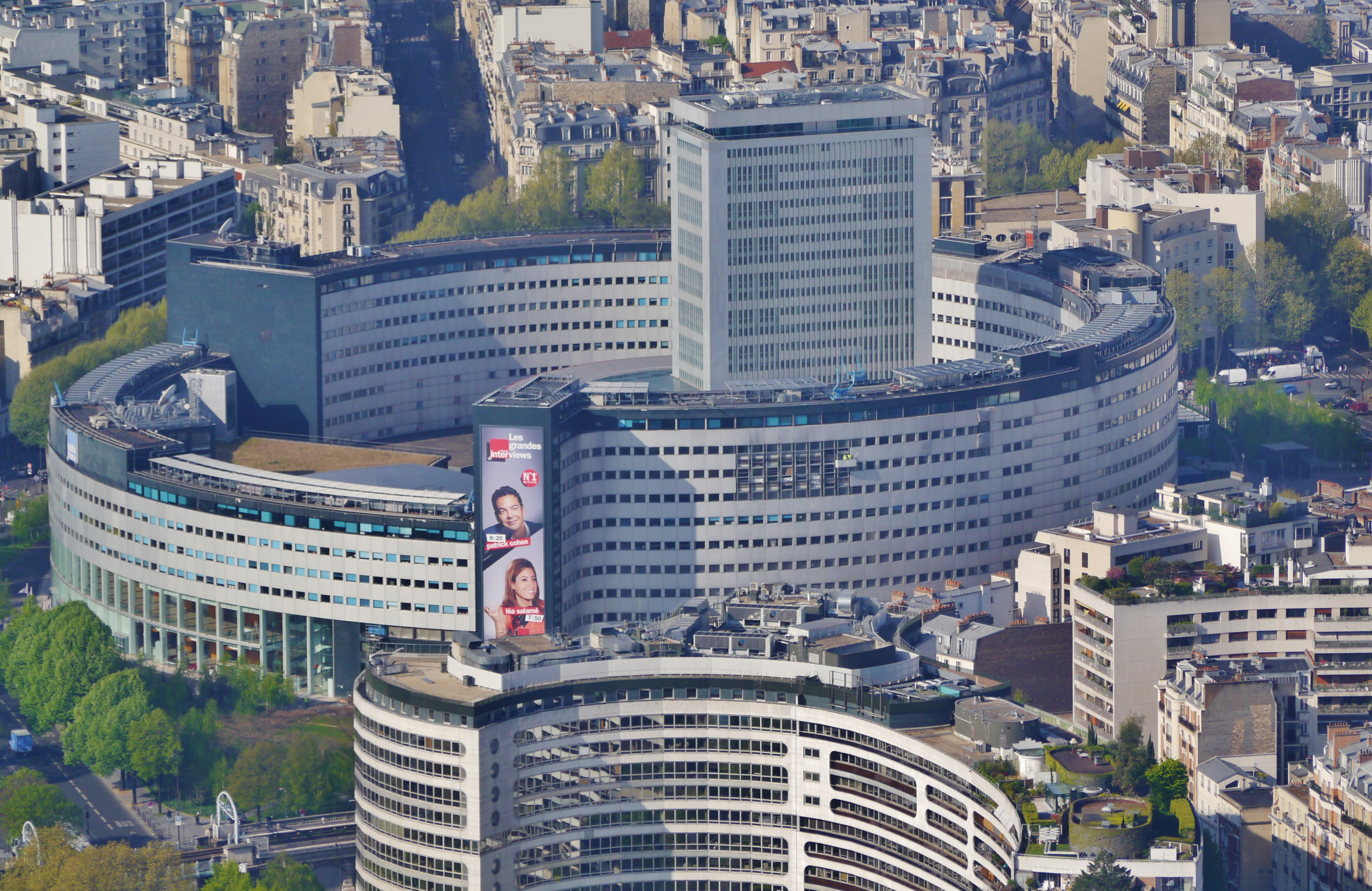
Seen from the Eiffel Tower in 2018

Maison de la Radio et de la Musique (French pronunciation: [mɛzɔ̃ də la ʁadjo e də la myzik]), nicknamed “maison ronde” (“the round house”) is the headquarters of Radio France. It is located in the 16th arrondissement of Paris near the Eiffel Tower. Built in the shape of a huge ring 500 meters in circumference, with a central utility tower, the building houses the administrative offices, broadcasting studios, and performance spaces for all of Radio France's national stations and its four permanent ensembles—Orchestre philharmonique de Radio France, Orchestre national de France, Chœur de Radio France and Maîtrise de Radio France. The building was designed by Henry Bernard and completed in 1963. It underwent a major renovation beginning in 2005 and began reopening to the public in 2014 with the inauguration of its new auditorium.

== History ==
After World War II, the French government had organised the state-owned radio and television channels into a single body, Radiodiffusion-Télévision Française (RTF). However its offices and studios were spread out over forty different locations in Paris. In 1952 the decision was made to construct a central headquarters which would house all the offices and studios in one location. The government acquired a 38,000 square meter tract of land in the 16th arrondissement on the banks of the Seine for the future building. Previously the site of a gasworks which had been decommissioned in 1928, and then a stadium, the location was considered ideal because of its proximity to the Eiffel Tower and its radio transmitters. A competition was held in 1953 to choose the architect. The winner from the 26 entrants was Henry Bernard who had won the Prix de Rome in architecture in 1938 and had participated in the post-war reconstruction of Caen.

The final model of the Maison was exhibited in March 1959 at the newly opened Centre of New Industries and Technologies (CNIT). The building was completed four years later and officially inaugurated by Charles de Gaulle on 14 December 1963. In his speech de Gaulle emphasised the importance of broadcasting and of the building itself as a symbol of France's grandeur and modernity:

Radio is a human activity, in other words a collective activity. It is undoubtedly nourished by the skill of individuals. But to be valid, it needs the combined effort of teams. And this is why this complex and imposing, but unitary and circular building is a sign of the organization, concentration and cohesion that are necessary for its audience and its influence.

At the end of 1974, French television and radio were split into two separate organizations. The building became the headquarters of Radio France exclusively and known as Maison de la Radio.

In March 2003 the Paris Prefect of Police ordered the evacuation of the central tower because it no longer met fire-safety regulations. The 368 personnel who worked in the tower were transferred to another building on Rue du Général-Mangin. However, by this time the entire building was in need of major upgrading, repair, and refurbishment and a debate ensued as to whether it would be more appropriate and economical to build a completely new headquarters for Radio France. In the end it was decided to renovate the existing building with most of its personnel and broadcasting stations operating there during the project despite the extra costs this would entail. The process began in 2004 when an international competition was announced for the contract to design and carry out the renovation. In October 2005 the contract was awarded to Architecture-Studio, with acoustical engineering by Nagata Acoustics and Lamoureux and scenography works by Changement à vue, and work began shortly thereafter. The initial budget for the work was €384 million, revised upwards in 2007 by €33 million to include an underground car park and a new organ for the main auditorium. The building was re-opened to the public in November 2014 with a gala concert by Radio France's two orchestras, the Orchestre philharmonique de Radio France and the Orchestre national de France, in the Maison's newly constructed Grand Auditorium. In 2016, the renovated Studio 104 reopened with a concert featuring both classical music and performances by Eddy Mitchell and Agnes Obel. However, final touches to the building and its landscaping would continue into 2017, lasting until late-2022.

On 10 January 2021, the building was renamed Maison de la Radio et de la Musique. Radio France announced the completion of all rehabilitation works on the building on 2 December 2022.

== Main public spaces ==
- The Grand Auditorium, inaugurated in 2014, is now the main concert space for Radio France's permanent ensembles—Orchestre philharmonique de Radio France, Orchestre national de France, Chœur de Radio France and Maîtrise de Radio France. Created out of the old Studios 102 and 103 during the renovation, it has a seating capacity of 1462. The walls and balcony facades are covered in faceted panels of birch, beech and cherry wood. The organ, which was built by Gerhard Grenzing between 2012 and 2014, is 12 meters wide and has 5,320 pipes.
- Studio 104, also known as the Salle Olivier Messiaen, was originally the main performance and broadcasting hall for the Radio France orchestras and choruses but was also used for concerts of contemporary and popular music. It seats 852 people and has been known since the Maison's construction in 1963 for its superior acoustics. The hall was closed for renovation from 2010 to 2016. During that time the seating was completely renovated, a choir stall was constructed to replace the organ which had been returned to Notre-Dame de la Treille, and the original bas-relief sculptures by Louis Leygue which decorate its interior walls were cleaned and restored. It is now used both for public concerts and as rehearsal space for the Radio France orchestras and choruses.

== In film ==
Jean-Luc Godard's 1965 dystopian science fiction film Alphaville was partially shot at Maison de la Radio. Goddard used no special props or futuristic sets. Instead, the film used recently built modernist glass and concrete buildings such as the Maison and the CNIT that in 1965 were still considered new and strange architectural designs.

Nicolas Philibert's documentary film La Maison de la Radio, shot over a six-month period in 2011, won Best Documentary at the 2014 Étoiles d'or du cinéma français awards and was nominated for Best Documentary in the César Awards that same year.

== See also ==
Similar complexes built for broadcasting during the era included:

- BBC Television Centre
- Maspero Television Building
