= Pianist Nada =

Pianist Nada Nada Loutfi
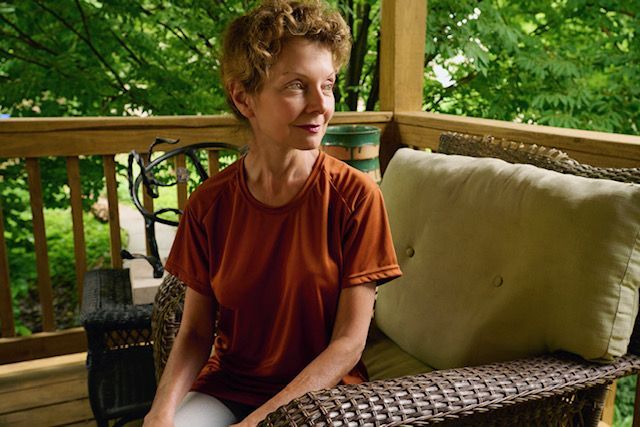
- Pianist Nada in 2024

Background information
- Born: Beirut, Lebanon
- Genres: Classical music
- Occupations: Concert artist, educator
- Instrument: Piano
- Website: pianistnada.com

Pianist Nada, born as Nada Loutfi is a performing and recording artist specializing in the solo piano works of Johannes Brahms (1833–1897).

== Early years and education ==
Nada Loutfi was born in Beirut, Lebanon, and began playing the piano at the age of ten. She continued her musical training during the Lebanese Civil War, during which her mother was tragically killed when a mortar shell hit their home. At the age of 17, she moved to France to study at the Conservatoire National Supérieur de Musique de Paris, where she graduated with a first prize (premier prix) in 1984. As a result of her internal displacement, Nada was mainly self-taught, relying on only a few music books to learn her instrument.

She was later admitted to the Paris Conservatory and became the first Middle-Eastern woman to earn First Prize in the piano competition in 1984. After spending several years touring and giving concerts throughout Europe, Loutfi completed further studies at the Banff Center in Canada in 1987. Subsequently, she moved to the United States and attended Indiana University, earning an Artist Diploma under the mentorship of György Sebők, while also studying with Franco Gulli and János Starker. From 1991 to 1993, she served as an assistant professor at Indiana University.

== Performances ==
Nada has performed in Salle Gaveau in Paris, Severance Hall in Cleveland, Yamaha Hall in Tokyo, Auditorium de Radio-France, Assembly Hall in Beirut. She has appeared as a soloist with the Louisville Orchestra, Lakeside Symphony Orchestra, Lebanese National Symphony Orchestra, Belgrade Philharmonic Orchestra, Dayton Art Institute, Eastman School of Music, Salzburg Festival and Montpellier Festival.

Loutfi established the Nevin House Piano Series in Louisville in 1994, taking on the roles of artistic director and featured performer.

In November 1995, Loutfi premiered "Crop Circles", a series of piano works written specifically for her and dedicated to her by composer Steve Rouse, under the national "Meet the Composer" program at the Landon Gallery in New York City. April 1996 saw her orchestral debut with the Louisville Orchestra, performing under the direction of conductor Lawrence Leighton Smith.

In 2020, composer Naji Hakim composed Variations on a Theme by Jean Langlais for piano, dedicating the work to Pianist Nada. She gave the world premiere of the piece on 6 June 2021 in Louisville, Kentucky.

== Outreach ==
In addition to her concertizing, Pianist Nada has hosted and performed on her own radio series called The Classical Hour. She won special prize in the International Piano Competition Claude Kahn in 1983. Pianist Nada has also hosted regular performances on the platform Groupmuse.

Naji Hakim wrote the piece Variations on the theme by Jean Langlais specifically for a Pianst Nada in 2020. The world premiere was in the USA in 2021. Quantum Rhapsody for Piano and Orchestra was written in 2023 by composer, Fernando Otero for Pianist Nada.

As an educator, Pianist Nada has given masterclasses (Basel, Switzerland and Campbellsville University, Kentucky) and served as artist in residence (Bellarmine University and Fairmont College) at universities and colleges both in the US and Europe. She is an adjunct instructor for piano studies at Indiana University in Bloomington, IN. In 1995, Loutfi became an American citizen and was named a Distinguished Citizen of Louisville, Kentucky by Mayor Jerry Abramson.April 1996 saw her orchestral debut with the Louisville Orchestra, performing under the direction of conductor Lawrence Leighton Smith.

== Discography ==
List of Nada's albums:

- Johannes Brahms Symphony No 1, No 2 (2022)
- Johannes Brahms Part I, Part II, and Part III (2020)
- Johannes Brahms’ 11 Organ Chorales for Piano (2019)
- Brahms Piano Works (2018), MEII Enterprises — a double CD album featuring Brahms's Intermezzos and Capriccios.
- Capriccios & Intermezzos – Nada and Brahms (2018)
- Nada Meets Johannes Brahms (2017)
- Vienna: Brahms & Nada (2017)
- Nada in Hamburg with Johannes Brahms (2016)
- “Les Sentiments D’Amour” (2006)
- Nada Loutfi, Pianist (1997)
