= Grand Auditorium (Maison de la Radio) =

French auditorium

Coordinates: 48.8526°N 2.2782°E

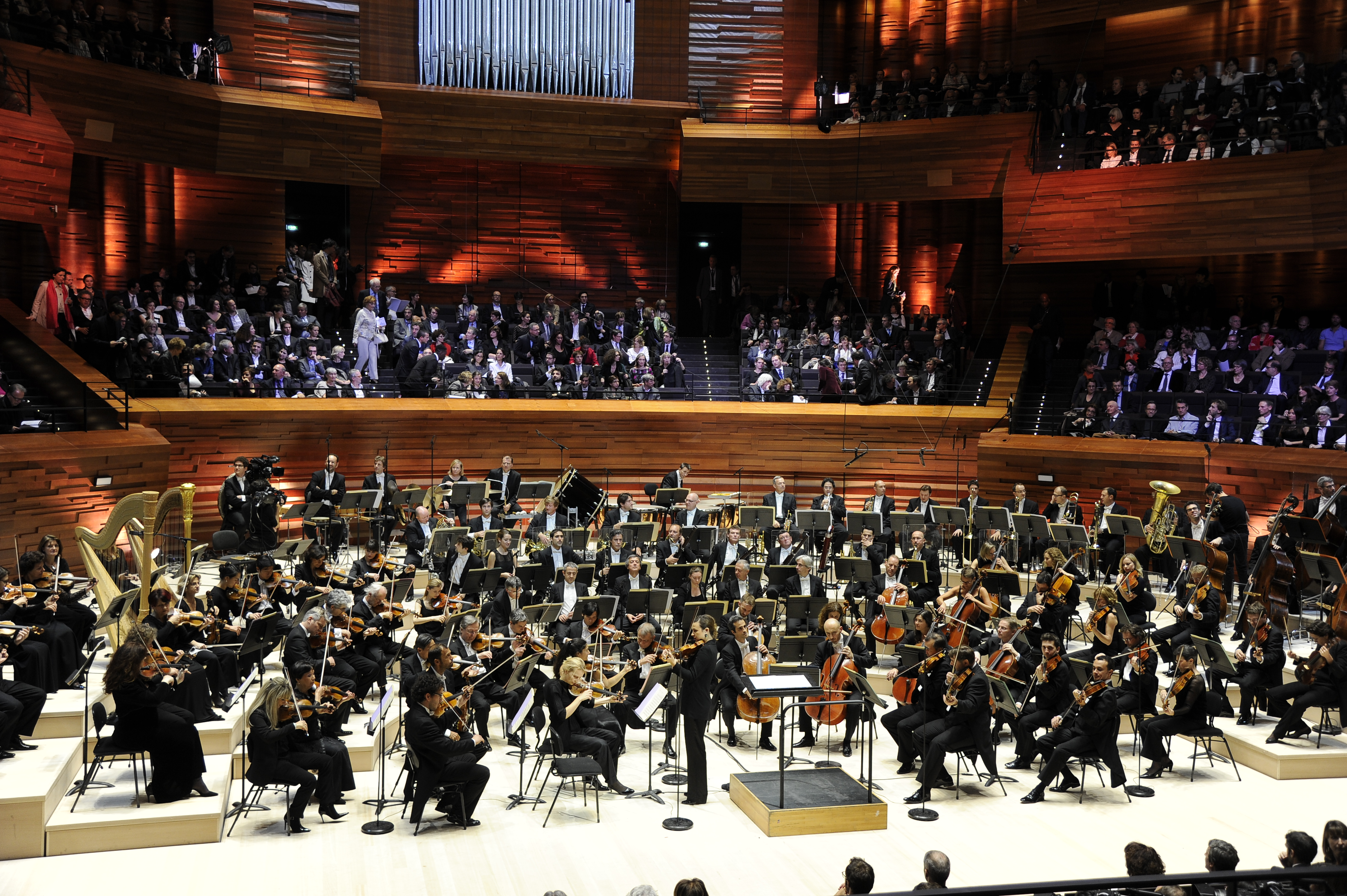
The auditorium in 2014.

Radio France Auditorium is an arena shape concert hall with an organ dedicated to the performance of classical music. Built as part of a major restoration work of the Paris headquarters of French national radio broadcasting organization Radio France, it is located in the 16th arrondissement of Paris in the heart of the city. The Auditorium was designed to serve as the residence of the four musical ensembles of the organization: Orchestre National de France, Orchestre Philharmonique de Radio France, Chœur de Radio France and Maîtrise de Radio France. Fully equipped with audiovisual equipment, the concert hall is also a recording and broadcasting studio and a screening room. The Auditorium is also devoted to Radio France seven national networks: France Inter, France Info, France Culture, France Musique, FIP, France Bleu and Mouv'.

== Construction ==
Located near the Eiffel Tower and the Paris Department Store Beaugrenelle, Radio France's Auditorium was built on the former studios 102 and 103 of the Maison de la Radio. The official inauguration took place on November 14, 2014.

== Architecture ==
Nine years after winning an international competition to restructure Paris’ Maison de la Radio, AS architecture-studio composes the auditorium. Inspired by the Berlin Philharmonic, Radio France Auditorium has 1,461 seats. The auditorium is shaped like an amphitheater, wrapping around the stage, with the furthest seats only 17m from the stage, thus creating an exceptional proximity between the audience and the musicians, and a deep sense of intimacy.

=== Acoustic ===
Two architectural firms contributed to the Auditorium’s conception: Nagata Acoustics, an international acoustical consultancy firm involved in the design of over seventy concert halls, and Jean-Paul Lamoureux Accoustique firm.

=== The "box in the box" ===
The Auditorium is designed with the constructive principle of "box in the box". The acoustic is rather emblematic of radio sound: direct, accurately defined and close to the source. The result is quite spectacular: a perfectly accurate sound, soft that offers an incredible proximity, even from the most distant points.

=== Balconies and bleachers ===
Its interior is composed entirely of wood (cherry tree, birch tree and beech wood), balconies are repeatedly staggered. The result is quite amazing and very beautiful. The dark wood of the hall contrasts with the light wood stage where the musicians play. The wood panels and the polycylinders on the rear walls allow sound to travel through.

=== The canopy ===
The suspended ceiling is 18 m above the stage and is doubled with an acoustic reflector called canopy. This reflecting panel provides a good acoustic propagation and is greatly increasing the sound quality.

== The organ ==
Organ, built between 2013 and 2016 by Gerhard Grenzing weighs around 30 tons, is 12 meters wide and 12 meters high. It has 5,320 pipes and 87 stops, 4 manuals (61 notes) and pedal 32 notes. It has 2 consoles, one with mechanical traction, one mobile with electrical traction, touch-sensitive; the 2 consoles can be played by two organists at the same time. France’s new Grenzing organ was inaugurated over the weekend of 7–9 May 2016 with a series of events ranging from children’s narration, recitals by rising stars, a concert for organ and ensemble, silent film accompaniment, and a grand recital by some of France’s top-name organists

In the "Fermata" episode of the TV series Astrid et Raphaëlle, infrasound from a generator in the organ is used as a murder weapon to trigger a heart attack in the intended victim.

== See also ==
- Maison de la Radio (Paris)
- Radio France
