= Maurice David =

French educationalist and writer

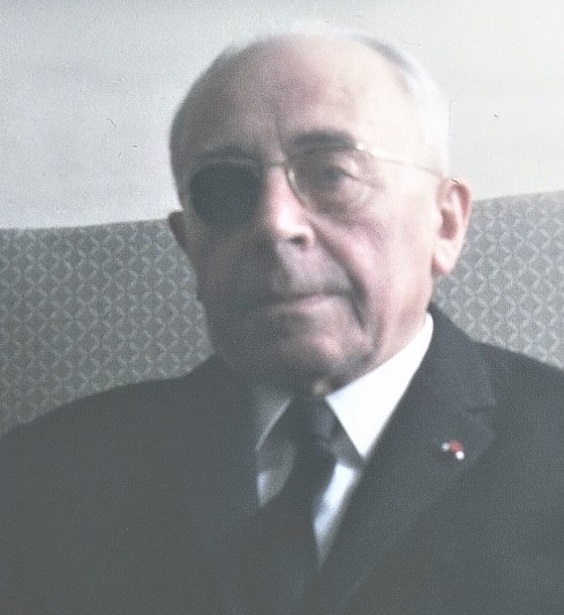
- David in 1969
- Born: Maurice Jacques Ernest David; 7 May 1891; Tonneins, France
- Died: 1974; Paris, France
- Occupations: educationalist; writer

Maurice David (7 May 1891 – 1974) was a French educationalist and writer. He served as France's Inspector General of Public Instruction and was the co-founder of the Maîtrise de Radio France.

== Life and career ==
David was born in Tonneins, a small town in south-western France, the son of Eugène François and Marthe Anne (née Rabié) David. He studied at the lycées in Poitiers and La Rochelle and then at the Prytanée National Militaire. He received his Agrégation in literature in 1914 shortly before the outbreak of World War I. After serving in the French army during the war, he began his teaching career in French North Africa, teaching at the lycées in Constantine, Algiers, and Tunis. By 1929, he had become the academic inspector of education for the region and Vice-Rector of the Algiers Académie.

In 1940, in his capacity as the Vice-Rector of the Algiers Académie, he refused the order from the Vichy Government to dismiss Jewish instructors. He was sent back to France and assigned as the inspector for the Montpellier Académie. He also joined the French Resistance and later wrote Monsieur Gaétan Instituteur, a novel based on his experiences during that time. After the liberation in 1945, he was appointed Director of Teaching Services and subsequently France's Inspector General of Public Instruction (Inspecteur général de l'instruction publique). He played a prominent role in France's post-war education reforms and introduced a system allowing children to study academic subjects for half the day and receive specialised training in sports or music for the other half. In 1946, he co-founded the Maîtrise de Radio France, France's first lay choir school. David was awarded the Resistance Medal (with rosette) in 1946 and in 1953 was made a Commander of the Legion of Honour.

David died in 1974 and was buried in Soumensac next to his wife Isabelle (née Biraben). They had married in Soumensac in 1920 and had two children. Their son André David (1922–2007) was a composer, pianist, and physician.

== Books ==
- Joseph Conrad l'homme et l'œuvre (1929). Éditions de la Nouvelle Revue Critique,
- Stendhal sa vie son œuvre (1931. Éditions de la Nouvelle Revue Critique
- Nous et nos enfants psychologie et méthode (1936). Fernand Nathan
- Initiation à Charles Péguy (1945). La Nouvelle Édition
- Autour de la pédagogie (1960). Fernand Nathan
- Monsieur Gaétan instituteur (1960). Éditions du Scorpion
