= 2025 Belgrade stampede =

Stampede during protest in Belgrade, Serbia

CCTV footage showing a portion of the stampede, as it happened near Beograđanka

On 15 March 2025, in Belgrade, Serbia, during the largest of the anti-corruption protests triggered by the Novi Sad railway station canopy collapse, a stampede occurred, followed by allegations that the government caused it by attacking the demonstrators with a "sound cannon" during a silent vigil for the victims of the disaster. There were no fatalities.

Russia's Federal Security Service (FSB) was invited to Serbia and arrived to investigate the "sound cannon" allegations. The Serbian government also invited the Federal Bureau of Investigation (FBI) to assist in investigating.

Prompted by Serbian NGOs, the European Court of Human Rights sought a response from the Serbian government regarding the allegations. On 29 April, the European Court of Human Rights issued an interim measure in the case, indicating to the Serbian government that it should prevent any use of sonic devices for crowd control and noting that the use of such weapons for controlling assembled citizens is illegal in Serbia and could potentially cause serious health consequences for large numbers of people.

== Background ==
In November 2024, mass protests erupted in Novi Sad after the collapse of the railway station canopy, which killed 16 people and left one severely injured and permanently disabled. As of 9 March 2025, the protests have spread to 400 cities and towns across Serbia and are ongoing. Led by university students, the protests call for accountability for the disaster.

The protests began with student-led blockades of educational institutions, starting on 22 November at the Faculty of Dramatic Arts after students were attacked during a silent tribute to the victims of the 1 November collapse. Other faculties and high schools soon joined in. Under the slogan "Serbia, stop", protesters staged daily (Serbian Cyrillic: Застани, Србијо, romanized: Zastani, Srbijo) traffic blockades from 11:52 to 12:07—the time of the collapse—symbolising the 15 lives lost (which would later increase to 16). During this time, participants remained silent in remembrance.

On 15 March, in what was then referred to as a culmination of the protest movement, an especially large gathering took place in Belgrade—reported variably as the largest since the protest and uprising of 5 October 2000; the largest in decades; and, according to some media outlets, the largest in the country's history. According to a civil-society group of activists, the protest was attended by 275,000 to 325,000 people, while the government reported a figure of 107,000.

Called "15th for 15" (Serbian: 15. за 15, 15. za 15), it was set to be held in front of the National Assembly. Attendees included students from University of Belgrade and other universities, citizens from across the country, and veterans of the 63rd Parachute Brigade. The protest's agenda for the day included the following items: the gathering in front of the National Assembly at 16:00; reading of demands and student speeches an hour later; a "blockade choir" at 18:00; and fifteen minutes' silent vigil at 19:00 to honour the Novi Sad victims; followed by two more items, with the ending set for 21:00.

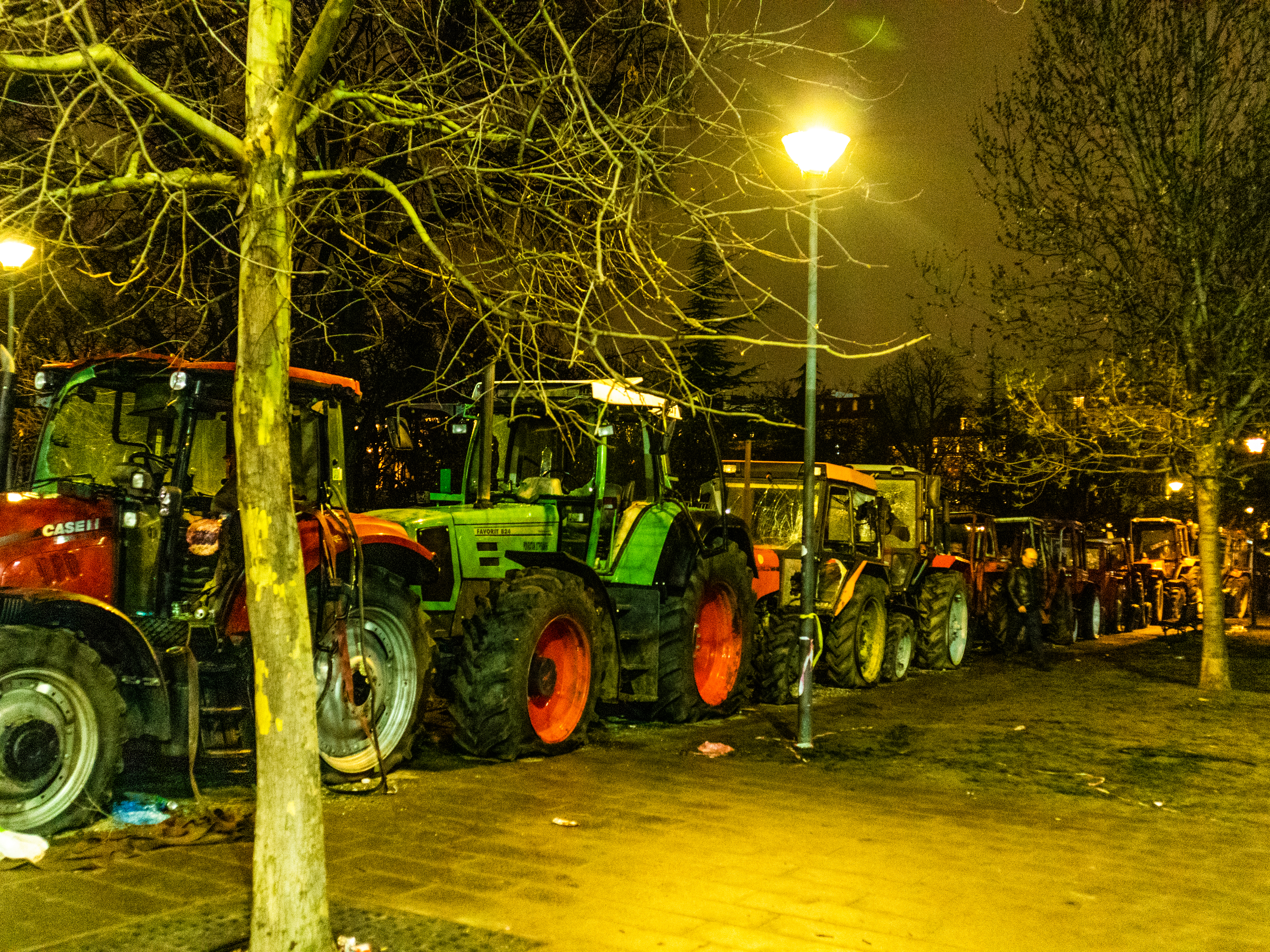
A portion of the improvised bulwark composed of immobilised tractors

A pro-government group named "Students 2.0" was encamped in the Pioneers Park, opposite the Serbian parliament, supported by a large contingent of anti-riot police, ex-Red Beret (JSO) servicemen, and black-dressed men of undisclosed affiliation, and barricaded within a layered perimeter comprising a crowd control fence enhanced by two rows of tractors parked flush against each other. These tractors were subsequently vandalised, rendering them immobile. The setup occupied a great deal of the open space in front of the National Assembly, which was protected by its own perimeter, guarded by the Gendarmery.

The central site would have been the plateau in front of the National Assembly, but with the space at the intended site being greatly constrained because of the park encampment, with altercations occurring at the perimeter, and with the tractor-made bulwark itself posing a fire hazard due to spilled fuel, the organisers, reportedly at the advice of the veterans (and reportedly also the bikers, who also formed a group affiliated with the protests), relocated the central site of the protest to Slavija Square, a wide-open area 1 km (0.62 mi) to the south of the National Assembly.

At 18:00, veterans and student marshals began clearing the area between the National Assembly and Pioneers' Park and the streets surrounding the latter. They formed human barriers to establish a buffer zone in the sector, restricting access to the general public and journalists. At approximately 18:45, the veterans, along with the bikers, left their posts, considering their task complete as the crowds were successfully directed toward Slavija Square. The sector was largely, but not entirely, emptied of protest attendees.

At 19:00, the scheduled silent vigil began, with attendees holding their cellphones' flashlights up.

== Events ==
Disturbances at the perimeter renewed in the minutes after the silent vigil began, with hooded attackers of unknown affiliation throwing objects such as glass bottles at the "Students 2.0" group and the police, and attempting to break through the perimeter. According to Tanjug, the attackers emerged from Dragoslava Jovanovića street, one of the streets bordering the encampment. According to a protest marshal claiming to have been near the scuffle, a stun grenade detonated. Explosions of firecrackers or salutes—pyrotechnic devices similar to firecrackers but significantly more powerful—were heard by people holding the silent vigil in the neighbouring Kralja Milana street.

At the break-out of violence, instead of maintaining their presence in the sector around the park perimeter and becoming entangled in the disorder, student marshals followed the prearranged withdrawal protocol, which included calling on attendees to disperse. At 19:03, one marshal in the vicinity urged the others over a megaphone not to respond to any provocations. According to an investigation done by Vreme, at 19:06, student marshals in the sector began removing their reflective vests and exclaiming that the protest was no longer theirs. Among the words exclaimed by student marshals in the sector were: "The protest is no longer safe"

CCTV footage of the stampede and the moments which preceded it at the three-way intersection of Dragoslava Jovanovića, Terazije, and Kralja Milana streets. The student protest marshals are in the upper right corner.

At around 19:10 (i.e., seconds prior to 19:11), a group of student marshals forming a human barrier at the entrance to the Dragoslava Jovanovića street from the three-way junction (Note: The two other streets forming the junction are Kralja Milana (extending southward to the Slavija Square) and Terazije (extending northward). Kralja Milana and Terazije are the two stretches of what is physically a single and straight urban road corridor measuring more than 1 km (0.62 mi) in length.) on the far side of the city bloc (relative to the side closer to the National Assembly) which includes the Pioneers Park also began enacting the withdrawal protocol, taking of their vests off and beginning to disband.

At 19:11, members of the disbanded group of protest marshals began running, some along Kralja Milana and the others along Terazije. Simultaneously with this, a tumult occurred within the crowd standing at the junction and still maintaining the silent vigil, spreading south along Kralja Milana and north along Terazije. A brief stampede took place with the members of the crowd in both streets scrambling to run away from the roadway, parting into two groups with rapid momentum along both stretches, which total several hundreds of meters in length, leaving the roadway nearly empty. According to one eyewitness:

We witnessed a phenomenon I can only describe as the "Mexican wave" of fear and panic. We were in a closed tubular system—a street surrounded by buildings acts as a tube—through which the impulse of fear and panic traveled from the direction of an incident we didn't see, while the people themselves served as the medium through which the impulse passed.

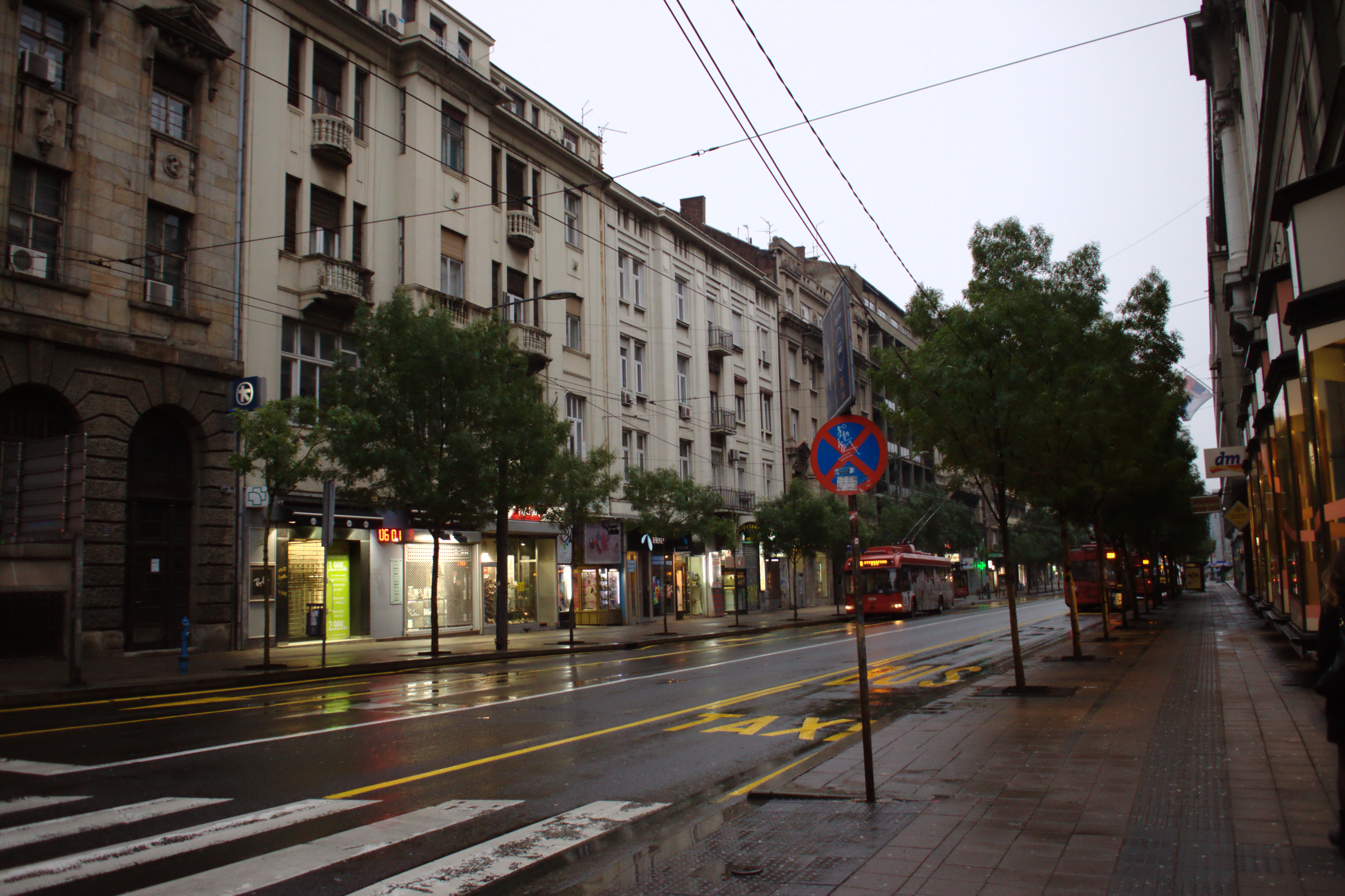
Kralja Milana street on an ordinary day. The area depicted lies along the stretch where protest attendees reported hearing a frightening sound.

A particular sound was heard by many in the stampede (especially so by those in the Kralja Milana direction, along a stretch of 450 m (490 yd)) producing a frightening sound localisation sensation of an approaching entity. According to one attendee: "People started rushing for safety toward the pavement, feeling that something was moving toward us down the street." The sound was described as "rolling forward" toward the listener, "speeding toward the crowd", and accompanied by a "whiz" or a "whoosh". The quality of the sound was described using varying language by various attendees, including (among other descriptions): a "deep roar" or a "rumble of a thousand horses"; the sound of a "train in a tunnel"; "the noise of a car moving at high speed and hitting something along the way"; the sound of a "jet engine" or a "low-flying airplane". Some protesters had been recording videos when the stampede occurred, but the sound matching the reported aural phenomenon cannot be heard in them.

Several minutes later, the Faculty of Dramatic Arts-affiliated group of the protest organisers announced on Twitter that the protest is over.

== Aftermath ==
Members of the public caught in the stampede quickly posted videos and questions on social media. Among the questions asked was: "Which technology did you use, and what was the purpose of this intervention?" Social media users and Serbian media outlets soon speculated that the videos showed an attack on the crowd from a "sound cannon", specifically a long-range acoustic device (LRAD). This theory was quickly promoted by opposition politician Zdravko Ponoš and military analyst Aleksandar Radić. Media outlets connected these speculations to a news story from recent years, which was at that time (and in mid-March 2025 still) unverified, that Serbia had bought LRADs. A proposal to permit the police to use LRADs in the manner of a sonic weapon was discussed in 2023 but was withdrawn. Serbia did buy multiple of these devices in 2021, however, as the government would confirm in the following days.

The Ministry of Internal Affairs and President Aleksandar Vučić denied that the government used a sound cannon.

On 16 March, numerous posts were made on social media about unusual health symptoms among protesters in Serbia, including dizziness, arrhythmia, hearing loss in one or both ears, and disturbances in pacemakers. Many citizens also suffered orthopaedic injuries caused by a stampede following the alleged use of a sonic weapon. Serbian volleyball player Vanja Grbić initially claimed that his colleague Marko Samardžić had suffered seven heart attacks due to the weapon's effect on his pacemaker, but later revised his statement, saying Samardžić had simply fallen ill during the protests. All of these concerns led students to organise a protest on March 17 in front of the Emergency Center, demanding the publication of the exact number of people treated after the 15 March incident.

On 19 March, daily newspaper Danas released an interview with an anonymous gendarme present at the protest. He stated that he had guarded a vehicle equipped with a long-range acoustic device (LRAD), adding that it was not used. He further stated that additional LRADs were stationed around the city. Photographs were released that day by Marinika Tepić showing the aforementioned vehicle with a mounted LRAD parked beside the National Assembly. Prior to that point, government officials had stated that no such weapons were deployed, with Vučić commenting on 18 March: "I'm telling you now—if our forces used a sonic cannon, Vortex, whatever it's called... well, then I'm not the president anymore. Pathetic liars." The government confirmed the earlier reporting that it possesses LRADs, and that an LRAD, specifically Genasys LRAD 450XL, was mounted on a vehicle operated by the Gendarmerie, parked next to the National Assembly, within the security perimeter. Minister of Internal Affairs, Ivica Dačić stated that any LRAD deployed by the Serbian government, including the one deployed during the protest, has only ever been equipped with a recorded verbal warning to disperse, that no LRAD was ever activated in an operational context, adding that the position of the vehicle meant that it could not have had the effect ascribed to a "sound cannon".

Prime Minister Miloš Vučević announced that Serbia had invited Russia's Federal Security Service (FSB) and the U.S. Federal Bureau of Investigation (FBI) to assist in investigating the "sound cannon" allegations. Ten days later, Vučić stated that FSB agents arrived on 28 March. Following this, a document, described as the FSB report by Serbia's Security Intelligence Agency (BIA), was published on the latter's website, in Russian and Serbian. It contains an account of the agents conducting an animal experiment by activating an LRAD in possession of the Serbian police on dogs; their reaction is recorded as unremarkable. It concludes by stating that crowd dispersal acoustic devices were not used, and adds that the crowd movement was synchronized and that a "staged provocation" was involved. According to Christo Grozev, the document is "absurdly vague, unverifiable, and clearly driven by predetermined conclusions".

The student organisers of the protest movement added a fifth demand to their existing four demands, stating: "We demand a thorough investigation by the competent authorities to establish all circumstances and the responsibility related to the incident that sparked fear and panic on 15 March at 19:11 along Kralja Milana street ..."

On 17 June, the human rights organization Earshot, which specializes in sonic investigations, conducted an investigation into the alleged sonic weapon attack, analyzing audio recordings from 19 videos of the protest, collecting over 3,000 written statements from participants, and conducting 15 interviews with witnesses positioned along Kralja Milana Street. The organization concluded that protesters were "very likely" targeted by a directed acoustic weapon and created an audio reconstruction of the alleged attack sound, describing it as a "sonic identikit" of what witnesses reported hearing during the incident. Earshot's findings contradicted official explanations from Serbian authorities, who attributed the disturbances to pyrotechnics and crowd noise.

== Later related developments ==
On 19 June 2026, the Higher Public Prosecutor's Office in Belgrade stated that it had tasked the Counter-Terrorism Service of the Criminal Police Directorate with gathering information in order to establish whether a criminal offence had been committed in connection with—as they alleged—a staging of a "simulation of the use of a 'sound cannon' by state authorities" at the 15 March protest. The office said certain concerned documentation had been seized during a search of the Faculty of Philosophy on 27 March 2026, carried out as part of a separate investigation into the death of a student and a fire involving pyrotechnic devices at the faculty, and that it included minutes of a 22 January 2025 meeting of—as the office alleged—the students movement's security working group at which meeting a "sound cannon" had been discussed. It said it suspected that participants in the meeting and unidentified persons had subsequently taken steps to stage the "simulation", so that the authorities would be publicly accused of it, in order to create panic and provoke unrest leading to a violent change of the constitutional order and endangering the security of the state, and that it had asked the police to determine whether their conduct contained the elements of the offence under Article 309 of the Criminal Code (calling for a violent change of the constitutional order).

The office directed the police to identify those who had taken part in the meeting, to establish who had caused protesters to leave the streets and who had ordered the student marshals to remove their reflective vests, to interview those who had publicly asserted that a "sound cannon" was used, and to determine who had organised the medical examinations of protesters said to have suffered the device's effects. Speaking on the public broadcaster RTS, a prosecutor at the office, Miodrag Marković, said that, once their identities were established, four groups of people would be prosecuted in connection with the events of 15 March, and that none would escape: (1) those who had attended the meeting; (2) those who had allegedly coordinated the movement of the crowd; (3) those who had published claims about a "sound cannon"; and (4) those who had attended the medical examinations two or three days afterwards.

In social media posts published the same day, an organization identifying itself as the student movement said the document cited by the prosecution had been produced about two months before the 15 March protest, before that gathering had been planned, as material from a meeting held in connection with a protest at Autokomanda at which security risks and possible police responses had been discussed.

On 22 June 2026, acting at the direction of the prosecutor, the police searched the home and office of Aleksandar Radić. Ponoš was summoned for a police interview on 1 July.

== See also ==
- Long-range acoustic device
- Sonic weapon
- Havana syndrome
