= Sonic weapon =

Weapon that uses soundwaves against opponents

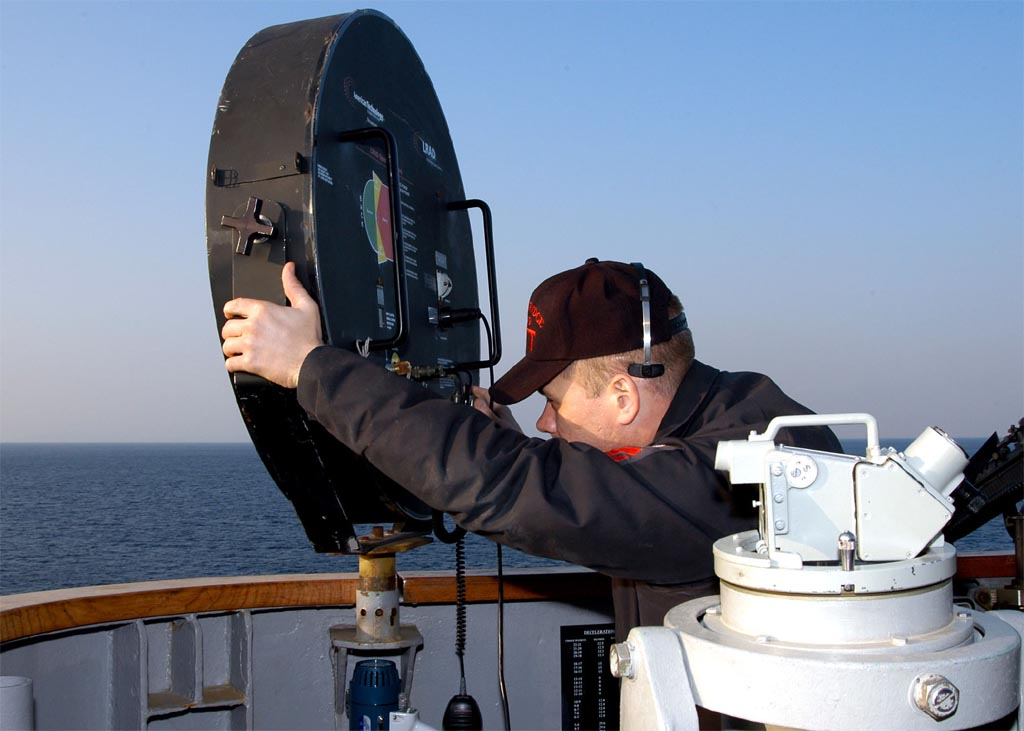
A long-range acoustic device (LRAD) in use on the USS Blue Ridge

Sonic and ultrasonic weapons (USW) are directed-energy weapons of various types that use sound to injure or incapacitate an opponent. Some sonic weapons make a focused beam of sound or of ultrasound; others produce an area field of sound. As of 2025, military and police forces make some limited use of sonic weapons.

== Use and deployment ==
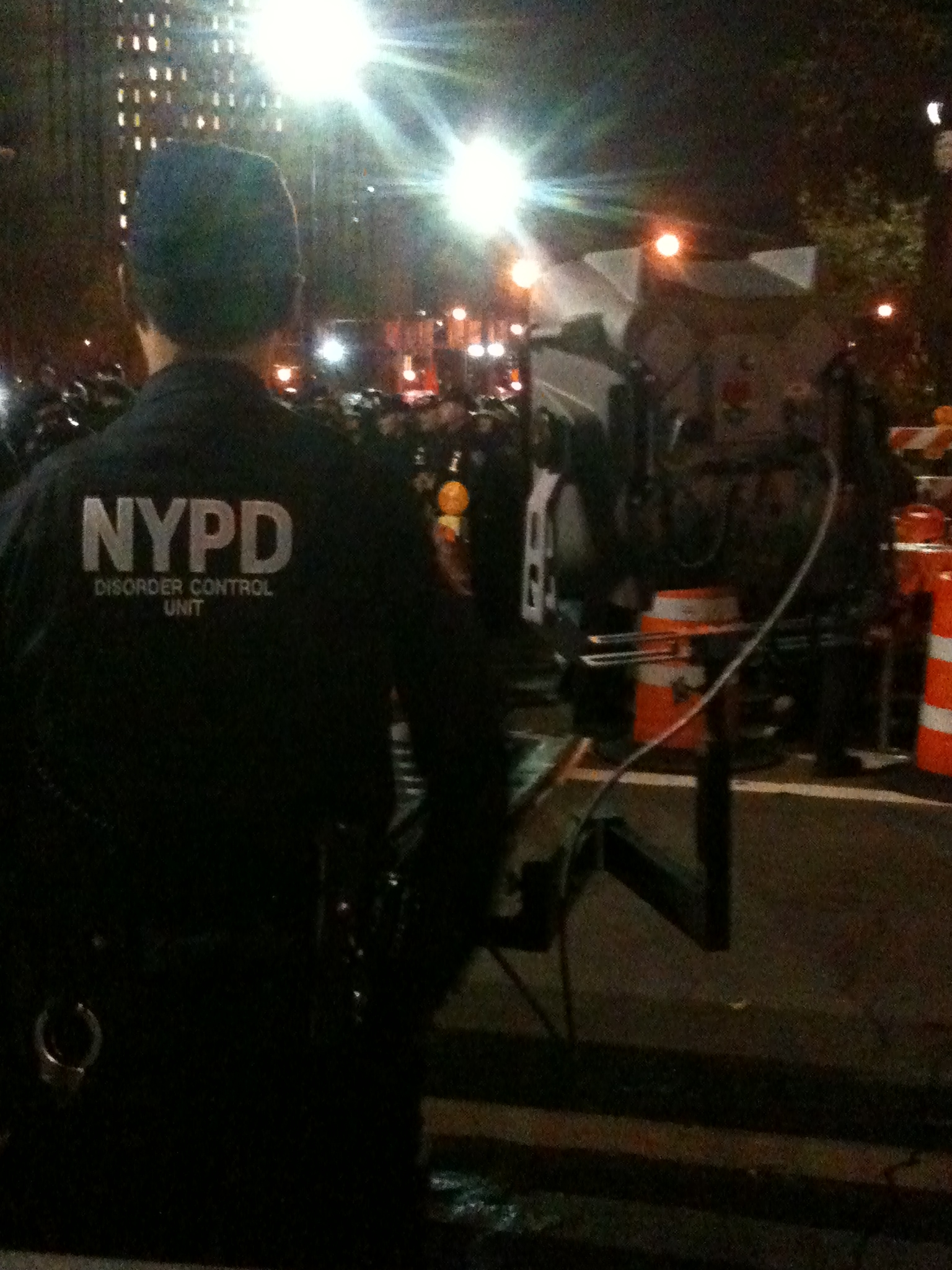
An NYPD officer stands ready with the LRAD 500X at an Occupy Wall Street protest on November 17, 2011 near the city hall.

Extremely high-power sound waves can disrupt or destroy the eardrums of a target and cause severe pain or disorientation. This is usually sufficient to incapacitate a person. Less powerful sound waves can cause humans to experience nausea or discomfort.

The possibility of a device that produces frequency that causes vibration of the eyeballs—and therefore distortion of vision—was suggested by paranormal researcher Vic Tandy in the 1990s while attempting to demystify a "haunting" in his laboratory in Coventry. This "spook" was characterised by a feeling of unease and vague glimpses of a grey apparition. Some detective work implicated a newly-installed extractor fan, found by Tandy, that was generating infrasound of 18.9 Hz, 0.3 Hz, and 9 Hz.

A long-range acoustic device (LRAD) produces a 30 degree cone of audible sound in frequencies within the human hearing spectrum (20–20,000 Hz). An LRAD was used by the crew of the cruise ship Seabourn Spirit in 2005 to deter pirates who chased and attacked the ship. More commonly this device and others of similar design have been used to disperse protesters and rioters in crowd control efforts. A similar system is called a "magnetic acoustic device". The Mosquito sonic devices have been used in the United Kingdom to deter teenagers from lingering around shops in target areas. The device works by emitting an ultra-high frequency blast (around 19–20 kHz) that teenagers or people under approximately 20 are susceptible to and find uncomfortable. Age-related hearing loss apparently prevents the ultra-high pitch sound from causing a nuisance to those in their late twenties and above, though this is wholly dependent on a young person's past exposure to high sound pressure levels. In 2020 and 2021, Greek authorities used long-range sound cannons to deter migrants on the Turkish border.

High-amplitude sound of a specific pattern at a frequency close to the sensitivity peak of human hearing (2–3 kHz) is used as a burglar deterrent.

Some police forces have used sound cannons against protesters, for example during the 2009 G20 Pittsburgh summit, the 2014 Ferguson unrest, and the 2016 Dakota Access Pipeline protest in North Dakota, among others.

It has been reported that "sonic attacks" may have taken place in the American embassy in Cuba in 2016 and 2017 ("Havana syndrome"), leading to health problems, including hearing loss, in US and Canadian government employees at the US and Canadian embassies in Havana. However, more recent reports hypothesize microwave energy as the cause or their bodies tricking themselves via a mass psychogenic condition caused by extended periods of stress, such as working in an embassy of a nation considered hostile to your own.

It has been claimed that the 2025 Belgrade stampede which occurred during the "15. for 15" anti-corruption protest was instigated by a sonic weapon. MUP and Ministry of Defense have denied usage of any sonic weapons against the protesters. During the 15 minutes of silence on the protest, at about 19:10, near the Beograđanka building, the sound caused many people to panic and physically react by falling down or jumping out of the way.

Following the 2026 United States intervention in Venezuela, White House press secretary Karoline Leavitt shared an eyewitness account of Venezuelan military personnel suffering injuries consistent with sonic weaponry during the American strike. Donald Trump, the President of the United States at the time of the strike, later told Katie Pavlich that "we have weapons nobody else knows about [...] we have some amazing weapons. That was an amazing attack." Trump's statement was seen as an indirect admission that a sonic weapon had been used during the attack. In a separate interview with the New York Post, he referred to one of these as a secret weapon called a "discombobulator," saying it caused Venezuelan defense systems, including Russian and Chinese rockets, to "not work," and that forces "pressed buttons and nothing worked" during the operation, although a senior U.S. official told CNN that Trump may have been conflating several existing technologies, such as cyber tools to disable warning systems and acoustic or directed‑energy systems, rather than referring to a single, undisclosed device.

== Research ==
Studies have found that exposure to high intensity ultrasound at frequencies from 700 kHz to 3.6 MHz can cause lung and intestinal damage in mice. Heart rate patterns following vibroacoustic stimulation has resulted in serious negative consequences such as atrial flutter and bradycardia.

See: Microwave auditory effect

=== Effects other than to the ears ===
The extra-aural (unrelated to hearing) bioeffects on various internal organs and the central nervous system included auditory shifts, vibrotactile sensitivity change, muscle contraction, cardiovascular function change, central nervous system effects, vestibular (inner ear) effects, and chest wall/lung tissue effects. Researchers found that low-frequency sonar exposure could result in significant cavitations, hypothermia, and tissue shearing. No follow up experiments were recommended. Tests performed on mice show the threshold for both lung and liver damage occurs at about 184 dB. Damage increases rapidly as intensity is increased. The American Institute of Ultrasound in Medicine (AIUM) has stated that there have been no proven biological effects associated with an unfocused sound beam with intensities below 100 mW/cm² SPTA or focused sound beams below an intensity level of 1 mW/cm² SPTA.

Noise-induced neurologic disturbances in scuba divers exposed to continuous low-frequency tones for durations longer than 15 minutes has involved in some cases the development of immediate and long-term problems affecting brain tissue. The symptoms resembled those of individuals who had suffered minor head injuries. One theory for a causal mechanism is that the prolonged sound exposure resulted in enough mechanical strain to brain tissue to induce an encephalopathy. Divers and aquatic mammals may also suffer lung and sinus injuries from high intensity, low-frequency sound. This is due to the ease with which low-frequency sound passes from water into a body, but not into any pockets of gas in the body, which reflect the sound due to mismatched acoustic impedance.

== See also ==
- Directional sound
- Electronic harassment
- LED incapacitator
- Parametric array
- Sonar
- Diver detection sonar - Anti-diver deterrent & counter-measure
- Sone
- Sound intensity
- Sound power
- Sound pressure
- Infrasound
- Ultrasound
- Long-range acoustic device
- Directed-energy weapon
