= Vladimir Gavreau =

French infrasound scientist

Vladimir Gavreau, born Vladimir Gavronsky (1904–1967), was a French scientist making experiments on the biological effects of infrasound.

Gavreau was born in Moscow. His interest in infrasonic waves first came about in his lab during the 1960s, when he and his lab assistants experienced pain in the ear drums and shaking lab equipment, but no audible sound was picked up on his microphones. He concluded that it was infrasound and got to work preparing tests in the labs.

One of Gavreau's experiments involved an infrasonic whistle that, some say, has led to a line of research that has military applications. William S. Burroughs described the possibly fictional device as follows:

"In developing a military weapon, scientists intend to revert to a policeman's whistle form, perhaps as big as eighteen feet across, mount it on a truck and blow it with a fan turned by a small airplane engine. This weapon, they say, will give forth an all-destroying 10,000 acoustic watts. It could kill a man five miles away. There is one snag: at present, the machine is as dangerous to its operators as to the enemy. The team is working on a way to focus it. Various systems of baffles have been tried, but the most promising method appears to be propagation of a different and complementary sound a wave length backward from the machine. This changes the frequency of airwave length moving in that direction, thus protecting anyone to the rear. There is, of course, a much simpler means of protection: turn the machine on from a safe distance. This summary of Professor Vladimir Gavreau's experiments with infrasound is based on the Sunday Times article. A much more comprehensive article has appeared in an American periodical, The National Enquirer, Vol.42, No. 27, March 10, 1968. Professor Gavreau's discovery has been patented, and anybody can obtain the plans and full description from the French patent office upon payment of two francs."

== Publications ==
- "Infrasound." Science Journal, vol. 4, no. 1 (Jan. 1968).
