= Héloïse Werner =

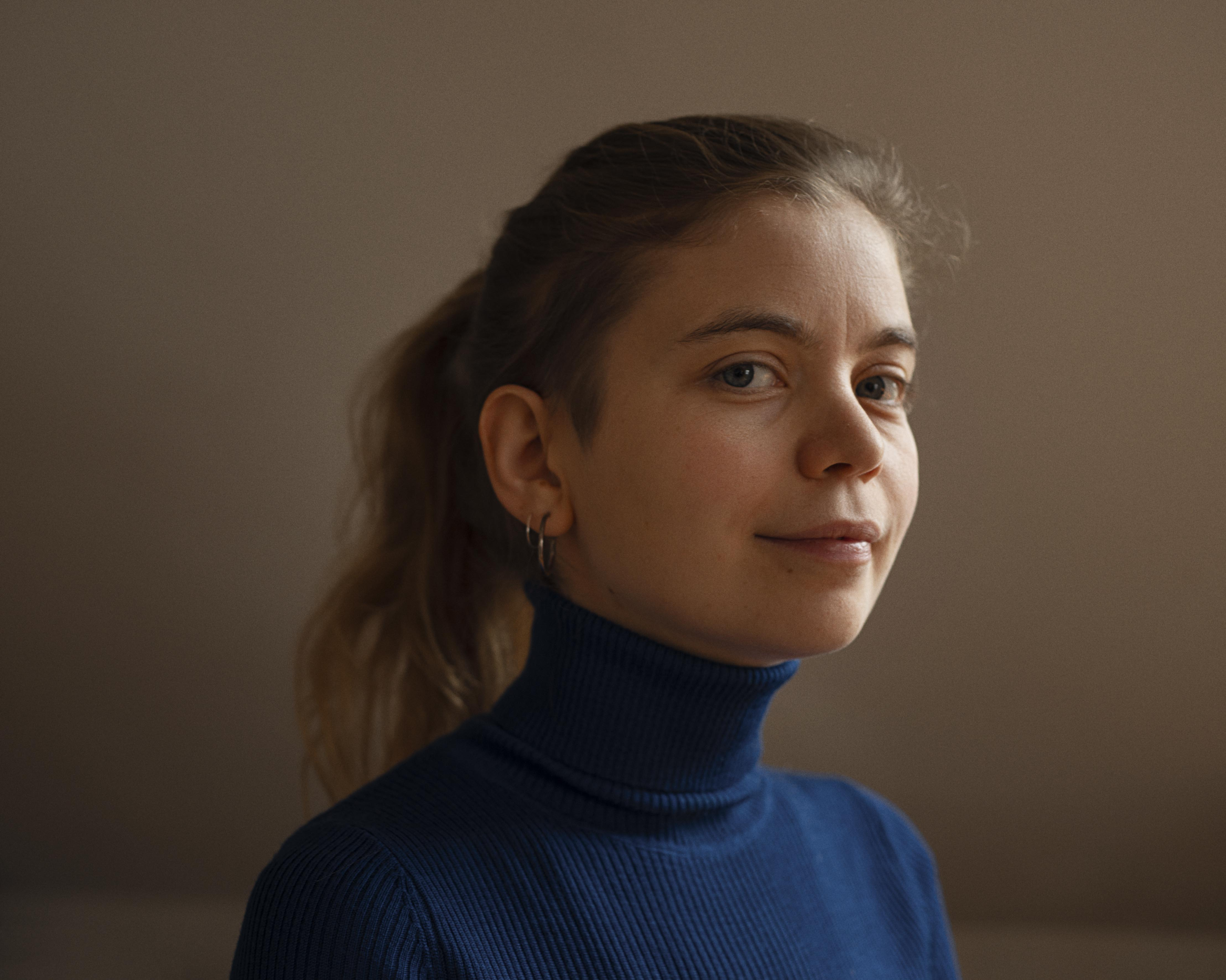
- by Eva Vermandel

Background information
- Born: 1991 (age 34–35); Paris, France
- Genres: Contemporary classical; experimental
- Occupations: Composer, soprano
- Years active: 2013-present
- Label: Delphian Records
- Member of: The Hermes Experiment
- Website: https://heloisewerner.com/

Héloïse Werner is a French-British soprano and composer based in London.

== Education and career ==
Werner studied as a choral scholar at Clare College, Cambridge, where she was a classmate of fellow Hermes Experiment member Anne Denholm. She then received an MA from Trinity Laban Conservatoire of Music and Dance. As a teenager, she was a member of the Maîtrise de Radio France.

Werner is currently an Associate Artist at the Wigmore Hall. She has performed with and written for ensembles such as the City of Birmingham Symphony Orchestra, BBC Singers, Manchester Collective, Maîtrise de Radio France, Aurora Orchestra and BBC Philharmonic Orchestra.

She performed her solo opera The Other Side of the Sea at King's Place, London in May 2019.

She released Phrases in June 2022 and Close Ups in June 2024 both on Delphian Records.Close Ups is nominated in the BBC Music Magazine Awards 2025 in the Vocal Category.

She is a founder of The Hermes Experiment, who were the winners of the Young Artists Award at the Royal Philharmonic Society Music Awards.

She is represented by Askonas Holt.

Héloïse is the daughter of German-born French mathematician Wendelin Werner.
