= Radiodiffusion Nationale (France) =

Former French broadcaster (1939–1945)

- Type: Radio; Television
- Country: France
- First air date: July 14, 1937
- Founded: July 29, 1939
- TV stations: Radiodiffusion Nationale Télévision (1937–1940); RDF Télévision Française (1944–1949)
- Radio stations: Radio-Paris (1939–1940); Radio Nationale (1940–1944); Le Programme National (1944–1945); Radio Tour Eiffel (1939–1940); La Voix de la France (1941–1944); Le Programme Parisien (1945); Radio PTT (1939–1940); La France fidèle (1942–1944); Radiodiffusion de la nation française (1944–1945)
- Dissolved: March 23, 1945
- Language: French
- Replaced: Radiovision-PTT
- Replaced by: Radiodiffusion Française

Radiodiffusion française nationale, renamed Radiodiffusion Nationale (French pronunciation: [ʁadjodifyzjɔ̃ nɑsjɔnal]; RN), was a public broadcasting company in France that was in charge of the production, broadcasting and coordination of radio and television programs.

It was founded on 29 July 1939 by the decree of then Prime Minister Edouard Daladier. The founding decision was motivated by the upcoming World War II, with the attempt to establish a state monopoly on broadcasting, coordinate propaganda and facilitate censorship. The work was interrupted temporarily on the basis of the provisions of the capitulation agreement before Germany on 25 June 1940 but on 5 July it started working in the so-called "Free Zone" of Vichy.

In 1943, its headquarters were relocated to Paris, where the radio service under the direction of the Vichy propaganda minister Philippe Henriot received an antisemitic and pro-Axis character. In the meantime, on 4 April 1944, the Provisional Government of the French Republic established its own RN in Algeria. It took over installations in Paris during the liberation of Paris on 22 August 1944.

As early as 1 October, RN launched its own television channel (Télévision française, later RDF Télévision française) the first in liberated Europe. On 23 March 1945 RN was reorganized into Radiodiffusion Française.

Among the radio stations managed by RN were Radio Tour Eiffel (1921–1940), Radio PTT (1923–1940), Radio-Paris (1924–1944) and Le Poste colonial (1931–1938, broadcast to the French colonial empire). In regards to television, RN managed Radiodiffusion nationale Télévision.
