= Vic Tandy =

British academic (1955–2005)

- Born: 1955; UK
- Died: 23 July 2005 (aged 50); UK
- Occupations: Lecturer, researcher
- Known for: Paranormal research

Vic Tandy (1955 – 23 July 2005) was a British lecturer for information technology at Coventry University, England, and an engineer. He was known best for his research into the relationship between infrasound and ghostly apparitions.

== Career ==
During 2001 Tandy was asked to investigate the cellar of Coventry's Tourist Information Centre and in 2004 he was part of a research group looking for paranormal activity in Warwick Castle. In both cases he found high levels of infrasound present. Tandy also conducted large-scaled experiments including one experiment on 750 participants at London's Royal Festival Hall.

Tandy also wrote a computer column for the newspaper Coventry Telegraph, and on the use of computers in higher education. He was also an associate member of the Society for Psychical Research and a chartered engineer.

== Leamington and Warwick Magic Society ==
Vic Tandy had an interest in traditional conjuring skills and tricks used by stage magicians. He believed this type of knowledge allowed him to detect hoaxes. He was at the time of his death a fully paid member of the Leamington and Warwick Magic Society.

== Work with infrasound ==
During the early 1980s, Tandy was working in a research laboratory for a medical manufacturing company, when, in his own words: "I was sweating but cold, and the feeling of depression was noticeable – but there was also something else. It was as though something was in the room with me." Tandy then claimed to have seen a spirit emerging in his peripheral vision, but when he turned to face the figure, it vanished.

He discovered the cause of the "haunting" by accident. The next day Tandy, a keen fencer, was polishing his sword when he noticed that the blade was vibrating even when clamped in a vice. From this Tandy developed the idea that infrasound might be present in the laboratory. Further experimentation showed that the infrasound trapped in the laboratory was at its highest next to Tandy's desk, right where he had seen the ghost. The infrasound was found to have come from a newly installed extractor fan.

Tandy went on to recreate his experience, and with the assistance of Dr. Tony Lawrence, he was able to publish his findings in the Journal of the Society for Psychical Research. Their research led them to conclude that infrasound at or around a frequency of 19 Hz, has a range of physiological effects, including feelings of fear and shivering. Though this had been known for many years, Tandy and Lawrence were the first people to link it to ghostly sightings.

Tandy also appeared in the "Ghosts on the London Underground" documentary.

== Death ==
Tandy died in July 2005, at the age of 50. He was survived by his wife and an adult son.
