= Zéphire =

Opera by Jean-Philippe Rameau

- Opera by Jean-Philippe Rameau
- Title page
- Librettist: Louis de Cahusac (attrib.)
- Language: French
- Based on: from Ovid's Fasti
- Premiere: 1967; Jubilee Hall, Aldeburgh

Zéphire (or Zéphyre) is an opera by Jean-Philippe Rameau in the form of a one-act acte de ballet. Nothing is known about the date of its composition, and it was probably not performed in Rameau's lifetime. The name of its librettist is also unknown but may possibly have been Louis de Cahusac. The subject comes from the fifth book of the Fasti by Ovid.

The first known performance of Zéphire did not take place until modern times when it was performed on 15 June 1967 at the Jubilee Hall in Aldeburgh, Suffolk, England.

== Roles ==
Cast	Voice type
Zéphyre (Zephyrus)	soprano
Cloris (Chloris) (later Flore)	soprano
Diane (the goddess Diana)	soprano
L'Amour (Cupid)	soprano

== Synopsis ==
Scene: A forest with an altar to Diana

Zephyrus, the god of the west wind, is in love with Chloris, one of the nymphs of Diana. As the nymphs approach, he hides himself in the foliage. The nymphs celebrate the return of the dawn (Chorus: "Chantons le retour de l'aurore") and reget the absence of Diana herself (Chorus: "Ô Diane, pourquoi vous séparer de nous?"). They deck Diana's altar with floral wreaths. As Chloris is about to leave, Zephyrus stops her, makes flowers magically appear beneath her footsteps and declares his love for her. Chloris is reluctant to trust his flattery, believing he is the mischievous god Cupid in disguise. As the other nymphs return, Zephyrus commands his followers, the zephyrs, to charm them in the guise of young men while he continues to woo Chloris. He asks Cupid to break the laws of chastity which Diana has ordered her nymphs to follow (Air: "Vole, Amour, brise leur chaíne"). The nymphs dance with the zephyrs but their pleasure is interrupted by the sound of a horn, signalling the arrival of Diana. They fear her anger, but Diana admits she too has fallen in love with the shepherd Endymion. She confesses the power of Cupid and frees them from their vows of chastity. Zephyrus and Chloris sing of their love for one another (Duet: "Qu'il est doux de suivre") and Zephyrus transforms her into Flora, the goddess of Spring. Cupid appears and everyone celebrates his triumph (Duet and chorus: "Amour, sois le dieu de nos âmes").

== Recordings ==
- Zéphyre, sung by Philip Langridge (Zéphyre), Michèle Pena (Cloris), Isabel Garcisanz (Diane) with Maîtrise Gabriel Fauré, Choeur Elizabeth Brasseur, & Ensemble Instrumental de France conducted by Jean-Pierre Wallez, IPG 7465, 1976 (1LP).
- La Guirlande & Zéphyre, sung by Gaëlle Méchaly (Zéphyre), Rebecca Ockenden (Cloris / Flore), Sophie Decaudaveine (Diane) with Cappella Coloniensis des WDR, & Les Arts Florissants conducted by William Christie, Erato 8573–85774–2, 2000 (2CD).
