= Albert C. Geyser =

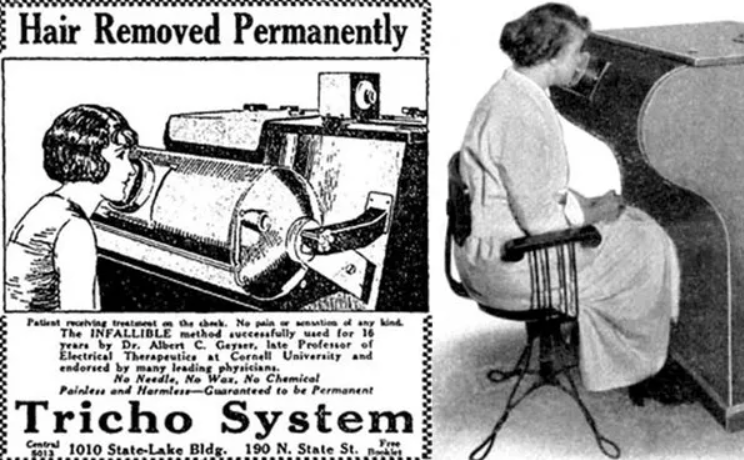
Geyser's Tricho machine

Albert C. Geyser (1865 – March 5 1940) was an American physician and inventor known for creating the Cornell Tube in 1905, named after the college with which he was associated. The Cornell Tube was made of heavy lead glass through which no X-rays were thought to be emitted and was thought to eliminate the danger of burning in medical use of the X-ray. Geyser claimed that the lead filtration would eliminate all unsafe radiation. He was known for promoting X-ray to eliminate "excessive hair" to achieve "faultless skin" that would be white and hairless. His invention made him famous and his wedding to Annie S. Higbie was covered in the front page of The New York Times.

Geyser was born in Germany. He was a professor of physiological therapy at Fordham University and instructor in electrotherapy at Cornell University Medical College.

== Tricho machine ==
Geyser's Tricho machine which removed unwanted hair through X-rays was responsible for causing thousands of women sores, tumours and cancer. Geyser sold his Tricho machines through Tricho Sales Corporation in New York City. By 1925, his Tricho machines were leased to more than 75 beauty salons throughout the United States where woman would receive an average of 20 X-ray treatments on their cheeks and upper lips to permanently remove surplus hair. He is estimated to have had 200,000 clients at his New York Clinic.

Geyser's Tricho system was criticized by the American Medical Association as quackery who noted that there were cases of pre-cancerous keratoses in women who had used the machines.

His experimentation with X-ray radiation on his direct skin forced the amputation of all the fingers, metacarpal bones, and one row of carpal bones on his left hand to stop the spread of cancer. He later lost his right hand to ulcers.

== Selected publications ==
- Using X-Rays Without Burning (1908)
