= Radiodiffusion-Télévision Française =

French national public broadcaster television organization

- Type: Établissement public à caractère industriel et commercial
- Country: France
- Owner: Government of France
- Launch date: 9 February 1949; 77 years ago
- Dissolved: 24 July 1964; 62 years ago
- Replaced: Radiodiffusion Française
- Replaced by: Office de Radiodiffusion Télévision Française

Radiodiffusion-Télévision Française (French pronunciation: [ʁadjodifyzjɔ̃ televizjɔ̃ fʁɑ̃sɛːz]; RTF; "French Radio and Television Broadcasting") was the French national public broadcaster television organization established on 9 February 1949 to replace the post-war "Radiodiffusion Française" (RDF), which had been founded on 23 March 1945 to replace Radiodiffusion Nationale (RN), created on 29 July 1939. It was replaced in its turn, on 26 June 1964, by the notionally less-strictly government controlled Office de Radiodiffusion Télévision Française (ORTF), which itself lasted until the end of 1974.

RTF was both state-owned and state-controlled. With a budget set by the French National Assembly under the direction of the Ministry of Information, all of its spending and investment plans had to be directly agreed by the Minister of Information and the Minister of Finance.

Alain Peyrefitte, Minister of Information, speaking in a debate in the National Assembly on 26 May 1964, described RTF as "the government in every Frenchman's dining-room" – La RTF, c'est le gouvernement dans la salle à manger de chaque Français.

== History ==
A public monopoly on broadcasting in France had been established with the formation of Radiodiffusion Française (RDF) in 1945. RDF was renamed "Radiodiffusion-Télévision Française" (RTF) in 1949 and ORTF in 1964. From the beginning, the public broadcaster experienced fierce competition from the "peripheral stations": French-speaking stations aimed at the French public but transmitting on longwave from neighbouring countries, such as Radio Monte Carlo (RMC) from Monaco, Radio Luxembourg (later RTL) from Luxembourg, and Europe 1 from Germany (exceptionally, in 1974, RMC was allowed to set up a transmitter on French territory).

== Offices ==
RTF's head offices were located in the avenue de Friedland in the 8th arrondissement of Paris. Its television studios and technical buildings were at 13–15 rue Cognacq-Jay.

== Channels ==
By the start of the 1960s, the RTF had established five radio and two television channels:

=== Radio ===
- France I (later France Inter) on long wave
- France II (regional programmes, closed on 8 December 1963 and replaced by Inter Variétés – a variation of France Inter for older listeners) on high-power medium-wave transmitters
- France III (later France Culture) on low-power medium-wave transmitters
- France IV (later France Musique) on FM only
- France V (formerly Radio Alger, a name which it was to resume on 5 July 1962 when it ceased to be part of RTF following the independence of Algeria)

=== Television ===
- La première chaîne ("The First Channel"), broadcast in black and white from 25 July 1948 on VHF 819 lines, and until 3 January 1956 on 441 lines. For a period, experimental 625-line transmissions (test cards) in colour using the French SECAM system (see below) were made on the channel's VHF network each Tuesday morning.
- La deuxième chaîne ("The Second Channel"), created on 21 December 1963 and broadcast on UHF 625 lines, initially in black and white only. Colour transmissions in SECAM were introduced (on this channel only) on 1 October 1967.

==== Regional television ====
Regional television, for areas outside Paris, was slow to develop compared with the situation in the United States of America and the United Kingdom.

The first regional station, known as Télé-Lille, began broadcasting on 10 April 1950 with two hours a day of programming for Lille and its surrounding area. The station's main news programme was called Images du Nord ("Images of the North"). Télé-Lille's signal did not stop at the country's borders, with the result that the station had five times more viewers in the Belgian provinces of West Flanders, East Flanders, and Hainaut than it had in northern France. By February 1952, the establishment of a co-axial link with the RTF's studios in Paris meant that Télé-Lille, when not televising its own programmes, could relay RTF's main Paris-originated programming.

In an attempt to counter the spread in Alsace of the viewing of programmes from regional television in the neighbouring German Land of Baden-Württemberg – the inhabitants of Strasbourg had, for example, been able to watch the coronation in June 1953 of Queen Elizabeth II of the United Kingdom only on West German television – Télé-Strasbourg began broadcasting on 15 October 1953.

Marseille followed on 20 September 1954, Lyon on 8 November 1954, Toulouse in August 1961, Bordeaux on 25 January 1962, and most other regional centres opened shortly thereafter.

From late 1963, the regional programmes were also broadcast on La deuxième chaîne by using optical standard conversion in the regional centres (a 625 lines camera aimed at an 819 lines monitor with a special CRT) in order to better adapt the regional coverage to the new "regions" created in France, and they remained even after the opening of La troisième chaîne (The Third Channel) under the ORTF on 31 December 1972, all three networks broadcasting the regional news, sometimes from two or even three different production centres (e.g. Niort broadcasting Poitiers on networks 1 and 3, and Nantes on network 2).

== Directors ==
The directors of the RTF were directly appointed by the Minister of Information.

Directors-general:

- Wladimir Porché: 9 February 1949 – 1 February 1957
- Gabriel Delaunay: 1 February 1957 – July 1958
- Christian Chavanon: July 1958 – 21 March 1960
- Raoul Ergman: 21 March 1960 – February 1962
- Robert Bordaz: February 1962 – 23 July 1964

Assistant directors-general:

- Raymond Janot: 21 March 1960 – February 1962

Directors of programmes, television:

- Jean Luc: April 1949 – February 1951
- Jean Arnaud: February 1951 – June 1952
- Jean d'Arcy: June 1952 – October 1959
- Albert Ollivier: October 1959 – 23 July 1964

Directors of news:

- Louis Terrenoire: 7 July 1958 – November 1958
- Albert Ollivier: November 1958 – June 1961
- André-Marie Gérard: June 1961 – April 1963

Directors of news (television):

- Raymond Marcillac: April 1963

Directors of sport:

- Raymond Marcillac: 12 September 1958

== See also ==
- France Televisions
- Groupe TF1
