= Radiodiffusion Française =

French public broadcasting institution

- Country: France
- First air date: October 1, 1944
- Founded: March 23, 1945
- TV stations: RDF Télévision Française
- Radio stations: Le Programme National; Le Programme Parisien; Radiodiffusion de la nation française
- Dissolved: February 9, 1949
- Language: French
- Replaced: Radiodiffusion Nationale
- Replaced by: Radiodiffusion-Télévision Française

Radiodiffusion Française (French pronunciation: [ʁadjodifyzjɔ̃ fʁɑ̃sɛːz]; RDF) was a French public institution responsible for public service broadcasting.

Created in 1944 as a state monopoly (replacing Radiodiffusion Nationale), RDF worked to rebuild its extensive network, destroyed during the war. It was replaced in 1949 by Radiodiffusion-Télévision Française (RTF).

RDF managed four radio stations: Le Programme National (The National Program), Le Programme Parisien (The Parisian Program), Paris-Inter and Radio-Sorbonne (the latter produced by the Sorbonne University). Also, it managed the TV channel RDF Télévision Française. All stations are fully run by the French government.
