= Orchestre philharmonique de Radio France =

French radio orchestra

Orchestre Philharmonique de Radio France
- Radio orchestra
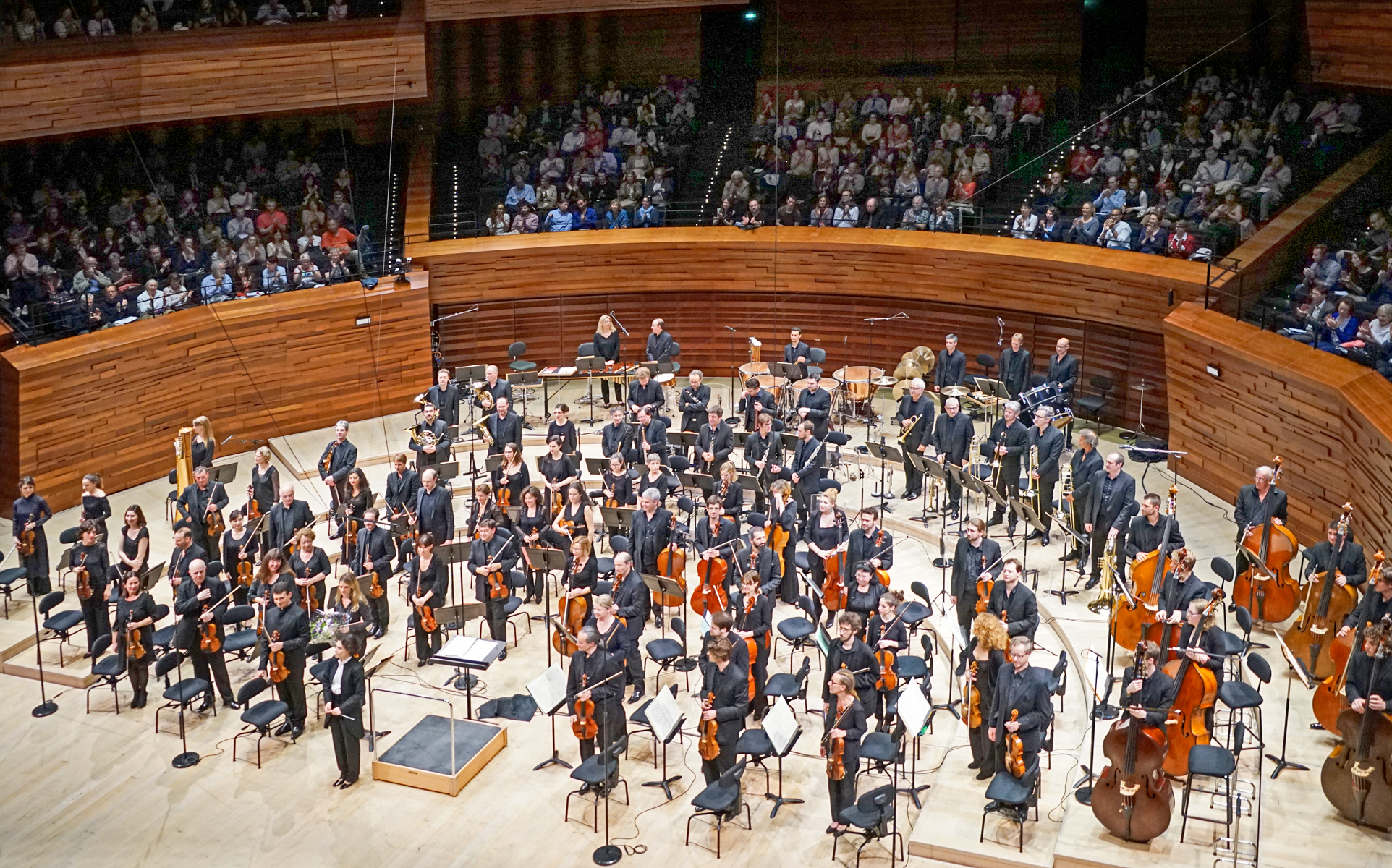
- Former name: Orchestre Radio-Symphonique (1937); Orchestre philharmonique de l'ORTF (1964); Nouvel Orchestre Philharmonique de Radio France (1976)
- Founded: 1937; 89 years ago
- Location: Paris, France
- Concert hall: Maison de la Radio
- Principal conductor: Jaap van Zweden
- Website: www.maisondelaradio.fr/concerts-classiques/orchestre-philharmonique-de-radio-france

The Orchestre Philharmonique de Radio France (French pronunciation: [ɔʁkɛstʁ filaʁmɔnik də ʁadjo fʁɑ̃s]) is a French radio orchestra, affiliated with Radio France. The orchestra performs principally at the auditorium of the Maison de la Radio in Paris, along with several concerts at the Philharmonie de Paris.

== History ==
Radiodiffusion Française established the orchestra in Paris in June 1937 under the name of the Orchestre Radio-Symphonique, under the auspices of Les Postes, Télégraphes et Téléphones (PTT) and its minister, Robert Jardillier. The orchestra was initially under the direction of Rhené-Baton, who guided the orchestra until his death in 1940. Eugène Bigot subsequently directed the orchestra musicians through the 1944 Liberation. Following World War II, Henry Barraud became director of music for the ORTF, and reorganised the orchestra, appointing Bigot as its music director in 1947. The orchestra performed regularly at the Salle Érard, and later the Théâtre des Champs-Élysées in the 1950s.

The orchestra was renamed the Orchestre Philharmonique de l'ORTF in 1964. Bigot continued as music director until his death in 1965. Charles Bruck subsequently became music director, from 1965 to 1970. In 1976, the orchestra was further renamed the Nouvel Orchestre Philharmonique de Radio France, with Gilbert Amy as its new musical director under its new name, and Emmanuel Krivine as principal guest conductor. André Jouve was administrator of the orchestra from 1975 to 1981. Marek Janowski became principal guest conductor in 1984, and music director in 1989. That same year, the orchestra received its current name, the Orchestre Philharmonique de Radio France.

Myung-whun Chung served as music director of the orchestra from 2000 to 2015. Chung now has the title of directeur musical honoraire (honorary musical director) of the orchestra. In September 2015, Mikko Franck became the orchestra's music director. In September 2020, the orchestra announced the most recent extension of Franck's contract, through 2025. Franck stood down as the orchestra's music director at the close of the 2024-2025 season.

In November 2023, Jaap van Zweden first guest-conducted the orchestra. In February 2024, the orchestra announced the appointment of van Zweden as its next music director, effective with the 2026-2027 season, with an initial contract of five years. In November 2025, the orchestra announced the appointment of Mirga Gražinytė-Tyla as its next principal guest conductor, the first female conductor to be named to the post, effective in September 2026, with an initial contract of three years.

The orchestra has recorded for such labels as EMI, Deutsche Grammophon, Decca, and Alpha.

== Names of the orchestra ==
- Orchestre Radio-Symphonique (1937–1964)
- Orchestre Philharmonique de la Radiodiffusion Française (1960–1964)
- Orchestre Philharmonique de l'ORTF (1964–1975)
- Nouvel Orchestre Philharmonique de Radio France (1976–1989)
- Orchestre Philharmonique de Radio France (1989–present)

== Music directors ==
- Eugène Bigot (1940–1945; 1947–1965)
- Charles Bruck (1965–1970)
- Serge Blanc (1973–1975)
- Gilbert Amy (1976–1981)
- Hubert Soudant (1981–1983)
- Marek Janowski (1989–2000)
- Myung-Whun Chung (2000–2015)
- Mikko Franck (2015–2025)
- Jaap van Zweden (2026–present)

== See also ==
- Radio orchestra
- Category:Music commissioned by the Orchestre philharmonique de Radio France (1)
