= Panorama of the Paris Exhibition No. 3 =

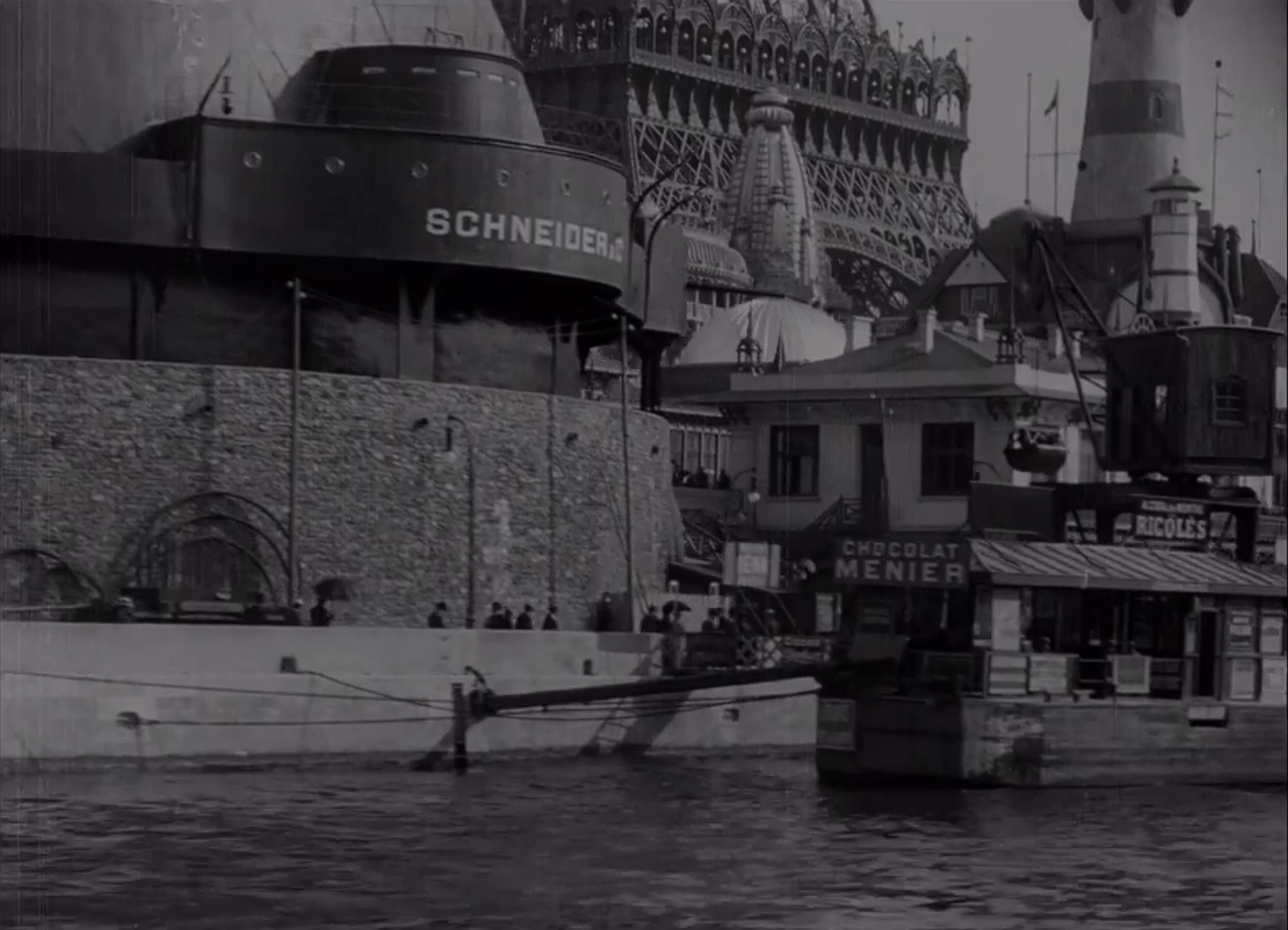
- Directed by: Cecil Hepworth
- Produced by: Cecil Hepworth
- Production company: Warwick Trading Company
- Release date: 1900
- Running time: 39 seconds
- Country: United Kingdom
- Language: Silent

Panorama of the Paris Exhibition No. 3 is a black and white silent short film from 1900 that shows early footage of Paris, France including the Eiffel Tower through one long clip.

== Synopsis ==
In the 39 second long film it shows a beautiful panorama of Paris in the year 1900 also showing the famous Eiffel Tower which was only 11 years at the time of recording, showing how large the Eiffel Tower is and how times have changed.
